= List of The Tonight Show Starring Johnny Carson episodes (1979) =

- No. of episodes: 225

Release
- Original network: NBC

Season chronology
- ← Previous; 1978 episodes Next → 1980 episodes

The following is a list of episodes of the television series The Tonight Show Starring Johnny Carson which aired in 1979. In October, 1962 Johnny Carson took over as host of the show from the previous host Jack Paar.

== 1979 ==
=== January ===
| No. | Original release date | Guest(s) | Musical/entertainment guest(s) |
|---|---|---|---|
| 4107 | January 1, 1979 | Martin Mull (guest host), Steve Allen, Susan Sullivan, Abigail Van Buren, Pete Barbutti | Joe Williams |
| 4108 | January 3, 1979 | Jack Lemmon, Robert Klein, Gary Collins | Brenda Boozer |
Desk- "Resolutions from Well-Known People"
| 4109 | January 4, 1979 | Robert Blake, Muhammad Ali | N/A |
Floyd R. Turbo- "Against Foreigners Investing in America"
| 4110 | January 5, 1979 | David Letterman, Marco Valenti | Linda Hopkins, Liberace |
The Edge of Wetness
| 4111 | January 8, 1979 | Don Rickles (guest host), Ernest Borgnine, Rip Taylor | Wayne Newton |
| 4112 | January 10, 1979 | Sammy Davis, Jr., Jim Fowler, Charles Nelson Reilly | N/A |
Desk- "Appointments Calendars of Important People"
| 4113 | January 11, 1979 | Angie Dickinson, Bob Glover | Buddy Rich, Larry Gatlin |
Sketch- "Frozen Farmer"
| 4114 | January 12, 1979 | Tim Conway, Richard Pryor, Dr. Lendon Smith | N/A |
Mighty Carson Art Players- "Superman Blackouts"
| 4115 | January 15, 1979 | Harvey Korman (guest host), Tim Conway, Bonnie Franklin, Bob Uecker | N/A |
Desk- Harvey and Tim reminisce about some of the old times. Harvey mentions that his present wardrobe is actually from 'The Carol Burnett Show'.
| 4116 | January 17, 1979 | Dick Cavett, George Gobel, Blair Brown | Martina Arroyo |
Carnac the Magnificent
| 4117 | January 18, 1979 | Lauren Bacall, Charlie Callas | Anthony Newley |
Desk- "The Least and Most Intriguing People"
| 4118 | January 19, 1979 | George Burns, Bess Armstrong, Marvin Hamlisch, Donald J. Duck | N/A |
Mighty Carson Art Players- "Personify Advertising in the Field of Medicine"
| 4119 | January 22, 1979 | David Letterman (guest host) | N/A |
This is Letterman's first guest hosting appearance. He would be a frequent guest host through the end of 1981.
| 4120 | January 23, 1979 | Gabriel Kaplan (guest host), Bob Hope, Johnny Yune | Kenny Rogers, Billy Preston |
| 4121 | January 24, 1979 | Gabriel Kaplan (guest host), Richard Lewis, Terry Bradshaw | Tony Orlando |
| 4122 | January 25, 1979 | Rich Little (guest host), Wayne Rogers | Leslie Uggams |
| 4123 | January 26, 1979 | Rich Little (guest host), Charles Grodin, Phyllis Diller | Bernadette Peters |
| 4124 | January 29, 1979 | Bill Cosby (guest host), Kelly Monteith | N/A |
| 4125 | January 31, 1979 | Christopher Reeve, Rodney Dangerfield, Susan Sarandon | Steve Lawrence |
Desk- "Psychic Predictions"

=== February ===
| No. | Original release date | Guest(s) | Musical/entertainment guest(s) |
|---|---|---|---|
| 4126 | February 1, 1979 | Cloris Leachman, Marcel Marceau, Jimmy Grippo | Pete Fountain |
Mighty Carson Art Players skit
| 4127 | February 2, 1979 | Tony Randall, Steve Landesberg, David Horowitz | Lola Falana |
Desk- "Benefits of Bad Weather"
| 4128 | February 5, 1979 | Don Rickles (guest host), Orson Bean | Loretta Lynn, Natalie Cole |
| 4129 | February 6, 1979 | James Garner, Sharon Gless, Merie Earle | James Galway |
Desk- "The Hottest New Business Ideas of 1978"
| 4130 | February 7, 1979 | Michael Landon, Buck Henry, Willard R. Espy, Francine Neago | N/A |
| 4131 | February 8, 1979 | McLean Stevenson, Herve Villechaize, Dr. Paul Ehrlich | Art Graham Trio |
Mighty Carson Art Players- "Adam & Eve" (Johnny and Betty White, who portray Adam & Eve in a situation similar to the Lee Marvin case.)
| 4132 | February 9, 1979 | Betty White, Martin Mull, Flo Conway, Jim Siegelman, Barry Bremen | N/A |
Desk- "Autobiographical Work by Stars"
| 4133 | February 12, 1979 | Bob Newhart (guest host), Stockard Channing | Glen Campbell |
| 4134 | February 13, 1979 | James Stewart, Gallagher, William Devane | N/A |
Pie Commercial Blackouts
| 4135 | February 14, 1979 | Johnny Yune, Charlton Heston, Blair Brown, Jack Douglas | Johnny Yune ("O Sole Mio") |
Desk- "Pilots That Never Made It"
| 4136 | February 15, 1979 | Henry Fonda, Fred Travalena, Chris Lemmon, Bob Glover | N/A |
Stump the Band
| 4137 | February 16, 1979 | David Brenner, William Demarest | Ray Charles |
Pie Commercial Blackouts; Mighty Carson Art Players- "Takeoff of 'Backstairs at the White House'"
| 4138 | February 19, 1979 | George Carlin (guest host), Gary Coleman, Vincent Price, Paul Williams | Linda Hopkins |
| 4139 | February 20, 1979 | Buddy Hackett, Sally Field | Eubie Blake |
Carnac the Magnificent
| 4140 | February 21, 1979 | David Steinberg, Marilu Henner, Bert Convy, Barbara Howar | N/A |
Desk- "20 Ways to Keep Your Relationship Alive"
| 4141 | February 22, 1979 | David Letterman, George Peppard, Sylvia Kristel | Buddy Rich |
Pie Blackouts; Desk- "Tonight Show's Hints and Ideas on Buying Homes and Real Estate"
| 4142 | February 23, 1979 | Peter Ustinov, Kate Mulgrew, Tom Snyder | Judy Collins |
Floyd R. Turbo- "Rebuttal to Scientific Research"
| 4143 | February 26, 1979 | Martin Mull (guest host), Dennis Weaver, Rob Reiner | N/A |
| 4144 | February 27, 1979 | Sophia Loren, Joan Rivers, Helen Shaver | The Hines Brothers |
| 4145 | February 28, 1979 | Bob Hope, Robert Blake | Monteith and Rand |
Desk- "International Road Signs"

=== March ===
| No. | Original release date | Guest(s) | Musical/entertainment guest(s) |
|---|---|---|---|
| 4146 | March 1, 1979 | Steve Martin (guest host), Rob Reiner, Jean Marsh, Steve Guttenberg | Hudson Brothers |
| 4147 | March 2, 1979 | Peter Strauss, Charles Nelson Reilly, Calvin Trillin | Kelly Garrett |
Sketch- "Mr. Science"
| 4148 | March 5, 1979 | Bob Newhart (guest host), Walter Matthau, Norman Fell | Freddy Fender |
| 4149 | March 6, 1979 | Rich Little (guest host), Cher, Elliott Gould, Gabriel Kaplan, Dr. Joyce Brothers | N/A |
| 4150 | March 7, 1979 | George Carlin (guest host), Beau Bridges | Pat Boone |
| 4151 | March 8, 1979 | George Carlin (guest host) | Larry Gatlin |
| 4152 | March 9, 1979 | John Davidson (guest host), Norm Crosby, Phil Donahue | Rita Moreno |
| 4153 | March 19, 1979 | George Hamilton, Jack Klugman, Victor Buono | N/A |
| 4154 | March 21, 1979 | Dick Van Dyke, Mary Tyler Moore, Dick Van Patten | N/A |
Desk- "Phony Pictures of Johnny's Vacation"
| 4155 | March 22, 1979 | Jack Lemmon, Shecky Greene, Kate Mulgrew, Richard Mitchell | N/A |
Desk- "Tips on How You Should Behave If You Have a Tax Audit"
| 4156 | March 23, 1979 | Doug Henning, Suzanne Pleshette, Dr. Carl Sagan | N/A |
The Edge of Wetness
| 4157 | March 26, 1979 | David Letterman (guest host), Betty White, Hal Linden, Kreskin | Hoyt Axton |
| 4158 | March 28, 1979 | Buddy Hackett, Ron Leibman | Mel Tillis, Lola Falana |
Desk- "The Movie Fans Calendar". This was the episode featured on a Best of Carson repeat on Dec 8, 1980 when NBC News broke in during the desk material to announce that John Lennon was dead.
| 4159 | March 29, 1979 | Governor Jerry Brown, Jean Marsh, Charlie Callas, Erma Bombeck | N/A |
| 4160 | March 30, 1979 | Albert Brooks, Shelley Winters | Anthony Newley |

=== April ===
| No. | Original release date | Guest(s) | Musical/entertainment guest(s) |
|---|---|---|---|
| 4161 | April 2, 1979 | Kermit the Frog (guest host), Vincent Price, Dr. Michael Fox | Bernadette Peters, Leo Sayer |
Desk- "Household Hints"
| 4162 | April 4, 1979 | Richie Barathy (martial artist), Angie Dickinson, Dr. Henry Heimlich | Ethel Merman ("Tomorrow") |
Carnac the Magnificent
| 4163 | April 5, 1979 | Joan Embery, Robert Blake | Kenny Rogers, Monti Rock |
Desk- "The Positive Aspects of Burbank"
| 4164 | April 6, 1979 | Cheryl Ladd, Buck Henry | Oak Ridge Boys |
Mighty Carson Art Players- "The 3.6 Million Year Old Man"
| 4165 | April 9, 1979 | David Letterman (guest host) | N/A |
| 4166 | April 11, 1979 | Beatrice Lydecker, Kelly Monteith, Marilu Tolo | Johnny Mathis |
Desk- "People Who Were Never Nominated for an Oscar"
| 4167 | April 12, 1979 | Maureen Stapleton | Pete Fountain |
Desk- "Burbank- Entertainment Capital of the World"
| 4168 | April 13, 1979 | Michael Douglas, Suzanne Somers, Dr. Lendon Smith | Debby Boone |
Mighty Carson Art Players- "Fire At The Hollywood Wax Museum"
| 4169 | April 16, 1979 | Martin Mull (guest host), George Gobel | N/A |
| 4170 | April 17, 1979 | George Carlin (guest host), Dudley Moore, Joseph Wambaugh, Johnny Yune | Vikki Carr |
| 4171 | April 18, 1979 | George Carlin (guest host), Rip Taylor, Marilu Henner | Ben Vereen |
| 4172 | April 19, 1979 | Don Rickles (guest host), Robert Conrad, Fred Travalena | N/A |
| 4173 | April 20, 1979 | Richard Dawson (guest host), Fernando Lamas, Carol Lawrence, James Coco | N/A |
| 4174 | April 23, 1979 | Bill Cosby (guest host), George Hamilton, Bernie Kopell | Dizzy Gillespie, Leslie Uggams |
| 4175 | April 24, 1979 | Bill Cosby (guest host), Meg Foster, Arte Johnson, Susan Anton | Wayne Newton |
| 4176 | April 25, 1979 | Bill Cosby (guest host), Diahann Carroll, Orson Bean, Hugh Hefner, Kip Addotta | N/A |
| 4177 | April 26, 1979 | Rich Little (guest host), Dennis Weaver, Jerry Van Dyke | Della Reese |
| 4178 | April 27, 1979 | Rich Little (guest host), William Shatner, Susan Sullivan, Dr. Joyce Brothers | N/A |
| 4179 | April 30, 1979 | David Brenner (guest host), Sal Viscuso | Charo |
Desk- "Fan Mail of David Brenner"

=== May ===
| No. | Original release date | Guest(s) | Musical/entertainment guest(s) |
|---|---|---|---|
| 4180 | May 2, 1979 | Raquel Welch | James Galway, Tony Bennett sang ("I've Gotta Be Me", "Rainy Day", "My Way" and "Nature Boy") |
Desk- "New Shows for Next Fall's Schedule"
| 4181 | May 3, 1979 | Charles Nelson Reilly, Carter Alsop | Roy Clark |
Desk- "How To Prevent a Burglary"
| 4182 | May 4, 1979 | Sammy Davis Jr., Betty White, Susan Sarandon | N/A |
Mighty Carson Art Players- "President Jerry Brown"
| 4183 | May 7, 1979 | Rob Reiner (guest host), Martin Mull | N/A |
| 4184 | May 8, 1979 | Buddy Hackett, Merie Earle | Larry Gatlin |
Carnac the Magnificent
| 4185 | May 9, 1979 | Ricky Schroder, Chevy Chase, Gallagher, Barbara Bach | N/A |
Desk- "Foreign Commercials", Johnny brings out a Jimmy Carter impersonator
| 4186 | May 10, 1979 | David Steinberg, Jill Ireland, The "Jim" Twins | N/A |
Desk- "Celebrity Baby Photos"
| 4187 | May 11, 1979 | Richard Pryor, Bess Armstrong, Calvin Trillin | Judith Blegen |
| 4188 | May 14, 1979 | David Brenner (guest host), Vincent Price | N/A |
| 4189 | May 15, 1979 | Florence Henderson, Johnny Yune | N/A |
Desk- "How to Get More Miles Per Gallon"
| 4190 | May 16, 1979 | Bob Uecker, George Peppard | Joel Grey ("Our Love Is Here To Stay") |
Desk- "Celebrity Endorsements"
| 4191 | May 17, 1979 | Bert Convy, Byron Allen, Victor Buono | Connie Stevens |
Mighty Carson Art Players- "G. Walter Schneer- Gasoline Company President"
| 4192 | May 18, 1979 | Dudley Moore, Charlie Callas | Eydie Gormé, Steve Lawrence |
| 4193 | May 21, 1979 | Martin Mull (guest host), Cindy Williams, Debbie Reynolds | Al Jarreau |
| 4194 | May 22, 1979 | Danny Thomas, Paul Dickson, Aaron Rudnicki, Tony Rudnicki | N/A |
Edge of Wetness
| 4195 | May 23, 1979 | Joan Rivers, Bobby Kelton, Marjoe Gortner, Dar Robinson | N/A |
| 4196 | May 24, 1979 | Ali MacGraw | Pat Boone, Pete Fountain |
Floyd R. Turbo- "Rebuttal on Gas and Nuclear Plants"
| 4197 | May 25, 1979 | Linda Gray, David Horowitz | Dizzy Gillespie, Eydie Gormé, Steve Lawrence |
Desk- "Little Known Types of Insurance"
| 4198 | May 28, 1979 | David Letterman (guest host), Susan Saint James | Jim Stafford |
| 4199 | May 29, 1979 | Sally Field, Garson Kanin, Vittorio Gassman | Joanie Sommers |
Desk- "Do's and Don'ts at the Supermarket"
| 4200 | May 30, 1979 | Jack Lemmon, Rodney Dangerfield, Robby Benson | N/A |
Desk- "Unusual Books and Their Titles"
| 4201 | May 31, 1979 | Sammy Davis, Jr., Jim Fowler, Victoria Principal | N/A |
Mighty Carson Art Players- "Howard Hughes' Video Tape"

=== June ===
| No. | Original release date | Guest(s) | Musical/entertainment guest(s) |
|---|---|---|---|
| 4202 | June 1, 1979 | Angie Dickinson, Tom Snyder | Ray Price |
Desk- "Fan Mail"
| 4203 | June 4, 1979 | Beverly Sills (guest host) | N/A |
| 4204 | June 5, 1979 | Rich Little (guest host) | N/A |
| 4205 | June 6, 1979 | David Brenner (guest host) | Tony Orlando, Mel Tillis |
| 4206 | June 7, 1979 | Richard Dawson (guest host) | N/A |
| 4207 | June 8, 1979 | Richard Dawson (guest host) | N/A |
| 4208 | June 11, 1979 | Bill Cosby (guest host), Dick Shawn | Bernadette Peters, Joan Baez |
| 4209 | June 13, 1979 | Tony Randall | Leonard Waxdeck & The Birdcallers, Buddy Rich |
Carnac the Magnificent
| 4210 | June 14, 1979 | Peter Falk, Bill Shoemaker | Lionel Hampton |
| 4211 | June 15, 1979 | Steve Martin, Doug Henning, Mariette Hartley, Bud Greenspan | N/A |
Floyd R. Turbo- "In Favor of Letting Skylab Fall on Earth"
| 4212 | June 18, 1979 | Bob Newhart (guest host), Peter Fonda | N/A |
| 4213 | June 20, 1979 | Dick Cavett, David Sayh | Lola Falana |
Desk- "101 Free Ways To Do in Los Angeles"
| 4214 | June 21, 1979 | Lillian Carter, Burt Reynolds, Carol Wayne | N/A |
Mighty Carson Art Players- "Tea-Time Movie"
| 4215 | June 22, 1979 | Elizabeth Ashley, Buck Henry | Chuck Mangione |
Desk- "Whoz Who"
| 4216 | June 25, 1979 | Bob Newhart (guest host), Shecky Greene, Andy Griffith | N/A |
| 4217 | June 26, 1979 | David Letterman (guest host) | Loretta Lynn |
| 4218 | June 27, 1979 | David Letterman (guest host) | Chuck Berry ("Oh What a Thrill" and "Johnny B. Goode") |
| 4219 | June 28, 1979 | Rich Little (guest host), Mickey Rooney, Dan Haggerty | N/A |
| 4220 | June 29, 1979 | Rich Little (guest host), Robert Stack | N/A |

=== July ===
| No. | Original release date | Guest(s) | Musical/entertainment guest(s) |
|---|---|---|---|
| 4221 | July 2, 1979 | Bob Newhart (guest host) | N/A |
| 4222 | July 3, 1979 | Bill Cosby (guest host) | N/A |
| 4223 | July 4, 1979 | David Letterman (guest host) | N/A |
| 4224 | July 5, 1979 | David Letterman (guest host) | Peter Marshall |
| 4225 | July 6, 1979 | David Letterman (guest host), Stockard Channing | Bernadette Peters, Jose Feliciano |
| 4226 | July 9, 1979 | Don Rickles (guest host) | N/A |
| 4227 | July 10, 1979 | Don Rickles (guest host), Jack Klugman, Bernie Kopell | Ben Vereen |
| 4228 | July 11, 1979 | Bert Convy (guest host) | N/A |
| 4229 | July 12, 1979 | Richard Dawson (guest host) | N/A |
| 4230 | July 13, 1979 | TBA | N/A |
| 4231 | July 16, 1979 | Diana Ross (guest host), Muhammad Ali, George Carlin, Lynda Carter, Alex Haley | N/A |
| 4232 | July 18, 1979 | Dom DeLuise, Dudley Moore, Deidre Hall | N/A |
Desk- "Vacation Snapshots"
| 4233 | July 19, 1979 | Peter Strauss, Charles Nelson Reilly | Joanie Sommers |
Sketch- "Mr. Sun Interview"
| 4234 | July 20, 1979 | Joe Namath, Susan Sarandon | Bob & Ray |
Desk- "Little Known Medical Facts"
| 4235 | July 23, 1979 | Sammy Davis, Jr. (guest host) | N/A |
| 4236 | July 25, 1979 | Joan Embery, Albert Brooks, Tom Warren | Ethel Merman |
Desk- "World's Hardest Quotes Quiz"
| 4237 | July 26, 1979 | Diahann Carroll, Christopher Reeve, Tony Delia, Merie Earle | Diahann Carroll ("All the Time") |
Desk- "Talk About Marlon Brando"; Sketch- "Interview with Sheepherder"
| 4238 | July 27, 1979 | Richard Pryor, Patti D'Arbanville, Roscoe Tanner, Floyd Jackson | N/A |
Desk- "Bad Jobs"
| 4239 | July 30, 1979 | Bill Cosby (guest host) | N/A |

=== August ===
| No. | Original release date | Guest(s) | Musical/entertainment guest(s) |
|---|---|---|---|
| 4240 | August 1, 1979 | James Mason, Rodney Dangerfield, Arlene Golonka | Debby Boone |
Carnac the Magnificent
| 4241 | August 2, 1979 | David Steinberg | Johnny Mathis |
Desk- "The Official Rules"
| 4242 | August 3, 1979 | Steve Landesberg, Dr. Carl Sagan | Ray Price |
| 4243 | August 6, 1979 | George Carlin (guest host) | N/A |
| 4244 | August 8, 1979 | James Stewart | Anthony Newley |
Singing Dog Contest
| 4245 | August 9, 1979 | Joan Rivers, Jean Marsh | Linda Hopkins |
Desk- "The Book of Strange Facts and Useless Information"
| 4246 | August 10, 1979 | Carol Burnett, Tim Conway, Robert Easton, Tracee Talavera | N/A |
Floyd R. Turbo- "Against Giving a Raise To Employees Who Deliver Essential Services"
| 4247 | August 13, 1979 | Roy Clark (guest host) | N/A |
| 4248 | August 15, 1979 | Tony Randall, David Letterman | Tiny Tim |
Edge of Wetness
| 4249 | August 16, 1979 | Buddy Hackett, Fernando Lamas | Brenda Boozer |
Stump the Band
| 4250 | August 17, 1979 | Don Rickles, Alan Alda, Arlene Golonka | Sarah Vaughan |
Mighty Carson Art Players- "20,000 Gallon Pyramid"
| 4251 | August 20, 1979 | David Brenner (guest host) | N/A |
| 4252 | August 21, 1979 | David Brenner (guest host) | N/A |
| 4253 | August 22, 1979 | David Letterman (guest host) | N/A |
| 4254 | August 23, 1979 | David Letterman (guest host) | N/A |
| 4255 | August 24, 1979 | David Letterman (guest host) | N/A |

=== September ===
| No. | Original release date | Guest(s) | Musical/entertainment guest(s) |
|---|---|---|---|
| 4256 | September 3, 1979 | Rich Little (guest host), Muhammad Ali, Loni Anderson | N/A |
| 4257 | September 5, 1979 | Ricardo Montalbán, Joan Collins, Diana Nyad | N/A |
Desk- "Things People Did Over The Labor Day Weekend"
| 4258 | September 6, 1979 | Suzanne Pleshette, Bob Uecker, Leonard Wolf | Hoyt Axton |
Desk- "Money Making Ideas"
| 4259 | September 7, 1979 | Claude Akins, Erma Bombeck, Walt Stack | Pete Fountain |
Mighty Carson Art Players- "The Lone Ranger"
| 4260 | September 10, 1979 | Kenny Rogers (guest host), Betty White, Gallagher, Helen Gurley Brown | Kenny Rogers ("You Turn the Light On" and "You Decorated My Life"), Connie Stevens ("Let's Stay Together"), Kenny Rogers & Dottie West duet ("Till I Can Make It on My Own") |
| 4261 | September 12, 1979 | Charles Nelson Reilly | Buddy Rich, Dionne Warwick |
Desk- "Things You Show Not Do"
| 4262 | September 13, 1979 | Angie Dickinson, Buck Henry | Stephane Grappelli |
Carnac the Magnificent
| 4263 | September 14, 1979 | Bob Hope, Don Rickles, Sydney Goldsmith, Mariette Hartley | Luciano Pavarotti |
Mighty Carson Art Players- "Commercial Blackouts": (Perri-Yech Water, Old Splice, Timex Watches, Goodwhich Blimp, and United Express Travelers' Checks)
| 4264 | September 17, 1979 | David Letterman (guest host) | N/A |
| 4265 | September 19, 1979 | Patrick Duffy, Henny Youngman | Dolly Parton ("Star of the Show" and "Sweet Summer Lovin'") |
Desk- "Tips for Travelers"; Dolly's original song: "(I Never Really Made It till) The Johnny Carson Show"
| 4266 | September 20, 1979 | Michael Landon, Dinah Shore, David Horowitz | N/A |
Commercials
| 4267 | September 21, 1979 | Robert Blake, Sharon Gless | N/A |
| 4268 | September 24, 1979 | Bill Cosby (guest host) | N/A |
| 4269 | September 26, 1979 | James Garner, Lesley Ann Warren, Buster Crabbe | Larry Gatlin |
Desk- "NBC and You" and "NBC and You- 1979"
| 4270 | September 27, 1979 | Dick Van Patten, Ivan Tors | Andrea McArdle ("Love Wings" and "Over the Rainbow"), Liberace |
Edge of Wetness
| 4271 | September 28, 1979 | David Steinberg, Calvin Trillin, Patti D'Arbanville | Crystal Gayle |
Stump the Band

=== October ===
| No. | Original release date | Guest(s) | Musical/entertainment guest(s) |
|---|---|---|---|
| 4272 | October 2, 1979 | TBA | N/A |
| 4273 | October 3, 1979 | Richard Dawson (guest host), Dr. Michael Fox | Della Reese |
| 4274 | October 4, 1979 | Richard Dawson (guest host), Orson Bean, Phyllis Diller, Kreskin | N/A |
| 4275 | October 5, 1979 | Richard Dawson (guest host), Earl Holliman | Rita Moreno |
| 4276 | October 8, 1979 | David Letterman (guest host), Elizabeth Ashley | N/A |
| 4277 | October 9, 1979 | David Letterman (guest host), Martin Mull, Melissa Gilbert, Bill Russell | N/A |
| 4278 | October 10, 1979 | David Letterman (guest host), Elke Sommer, Joseph Wambaugh | N/A |
| 4279 | October 11, 1979 | Martin Mull (guest host), David Letterman, Robert Guillaume, Anne Lockhart, Kip Addotta | Jose Feliciano |
| 4280 | October 12, 1979 | Martin Mull (guest host), Fred Willard, Cher, Cleveland Amory | Billy Preston |
| 4281 | October 15, 1979 | Bob Newhart (guest host), Shelley Winters, Dudley Moore, Teri Garr | Aretha Franklin |
| 4282 | October 17, 1979 | Carol Burnett, Kate Mulgrew, Richard Mitchell | Ray Price |
Desk- "Durations- The Encyclopedia of How Long Things Take"
| 4283 | October 18, 1979 | Charlton Heston | N/A |
Singing Dog Contest
| 4284 | October 19, 1979 | Erik Estrada, Marsha Mason, Tom Wolfe | Placido Domingo |
Sketch- "Consumer Supporter"
| 4285 | October 22, 1979 | David Letterman (guest host), Bill Cosby | N/A |
| 4286 | October 23, 1979 | David Letterman (guest host), Bob Uecker | N/A |
| 4287 | October 24, 1979 | David Letterman (guest host), Jay Leno, George Gobel | N/A |
| 4288 | October 25, 1979 | Bill Cosby (guest host), Larry Hagman | Shields & Yarnell, Harlem Globetrotters |
| 4289 | October 26, 1979 | Bill Cosby (guest host), Fernando Lamas, Lindsay Wagner | N/A |
| 4290 | October 29, 1979 | Rich Little (guest host), Lawrence Welk, Jim Davis | Peggy Lee, Jim Stafford |
| 4291 | October 31, 1979 | James Woods, Wally Lattimer | Lola Falana |
Mighty Carson Art Players- "Halloween Witch"

=== November ===
| No. | Original release date | Guest(s) | Musical/entertainment guest(s) |
|---|---|---|---|
| 4292 | November 1, 1979 | Joan Rivers, Douglas Fairbanks, Jr., Dr. Paul Ehrlich | June Valli |
Desk- "Famous Americans You Never Knew Existed"
| 4293 | November 2, 1979 | Joan Embery, Bo Derek, Charles Nelson Reilly, Mickey Ziffren | Pete Fountain |
| 4294 | November 5, 1979 | David Brenner (guest host), Steve Martin, Marvin Hamlisch, Art Carney | Sister Sledge |
| 4295 | November 6, 1979 | Angie Dickinson, Bert Convy, Sydney Goldsmith, Garson Kanin | N/A |
Carnac the Magnificent
| 4296 | November 7, 1979 | Robert Blake, Dan Ford | James Galway, Marilyn Maye |
Desk- "Contenders for Presidency"
| 4297 | November 8, 1979 | Kate Jackson | Marilyn Horne |
Mighty Carson Art Players- "The Russian Ballet Defector"
| 4298 | November 9, 1979 | Tim Conway, Robby Benson, Mary-Margaret Humes, Paul Erdman | N/A |
Desk- "Little Known Nostalgia"
| 4299 | November 12, 1979 | David Letterman (guest host), Betty White | Harry Chapin |
| 4300 | November 13, 1979 | Arnold Schwarzenegger, Elizabeth Ashley, Pete Barbutti | N/A |
Desk- "Unusual Services in Los Angeles"
| 4301 | November 14, 1979 | Fernando Lamas, Jean Marsh, Ray Johnson | Barry Manilow |
Desk- "Viewer Mail"
| 4302 | November 15, 1979 | Buddy Hackett | Steve Lawrence, Dizzy Gillespie |
Desk- "More Fascinating Facts"
| 4303 | November 16, 1979 | Bob Hope, Raquel Welch, Bud Greenspan | Carol Neblett |
Mighty Carson Art Players- "Eyewitless News"
| 4304 | November 19, 1979 | David Steinberg (guest host), Burt Reynolds | Rita Moreno |
| 4305 | November 20, 1979 | Suzanne Pleshette, Buck Henry, Sarah Purcell | Joe Williams |
Desk- "Sweeps Week"
| 4306 | November 21, 1979 | Tony Randall, Kelly Monteith, Thomas Thompson | Buddy Rich |
Desk- Johnny and Doc Severinsen discuss Thanksgiving plans
| 4307 | November 22, 1979 | Arlene Golonka, George Wallace, Bartine Burkett Zane | Tony Bennett |
Desk- "Thanksgiving Letters from Children"
| 4308 | November 23, 1979 | George Carlin, Michael Korda | Brenda Boozer, Pat Boone |
Carson Cemetery
| 4309 | November 26, 1979 | Bill Cosby (guest host), Susan Saint James, Gallagher | Bobby Goldsboro |
| 4310 | November 27, 1979 | Joe Namath, Johnny Yune | Crystal Gayle, Red Norvo, Ross Tompkins |
Desk- "Spoof on Famous Lines"
| 4311 | November 28, 1979 | Charlie Callas, Calvin Trillin | Donna Summer, The Oak Ridge Boys |
Floyd R. Turbo- "Anti-Ecology"
| 4312 | November 29, 1979 | David Steinberg, Dick Van Patten, Donna Woolfolk Cross | Melissa Manchester |
Desk- "Christmas Catalogues"
| 4313 | November 30, 1979 | James Woods, Erma Bombeck | Beverly Sills, Monti Rock |
Edge of Wetness

=== December ===
| No. | Original release date | Guest(s) | Musical/entertainment guest(s) |
|---|---|---|---|
| 4314 | December 3, 1979 | Bill Cosby (guest host), Marilu Henner, James Earl Jones | Tammy Wynette |
| 4315 | December 4, 1979 | David Letterman (guest host), Dr. Joyce Brothers, Mike Farrell | N/A |
| 4316 | December 5, 1979 | David Letterman (guest host), Teri Garr, George Plimpton | N/A |
| 4317 | December 6, 1979 | Richard Dawson (guest host), James Coco, Cleveland Amory | N/A |
| 4318 | December 7, 1979 | Richard Dawson (guest host), William Shatner, Lauren Tewes, Kip Addotta, Helen Gurley Brown | Donna Theodore |
| 4319 | December 10, 1979 | Jack Klugman | N/A |
| 4320 | December 12, 1979 | Carl Reiner, Henry Winkler, Bob Hope | Louie Bellson |
Desk- "Letters to Santa Claus"
| 4321 | December 13, 1979 | Steve Martin, Garson Kanin | Phyllis Newman, Placido Domingo |
Desk- "Who's in Charge Here"
| 4322 | December 14, 1979 | Ricky Schroder, Bruce Jenner, Dr. Robert Ballard | Connie Stevens |
Stump the Band
| 4323 | December 17, 1979 | Rich Little (guest host), Buddy Ebsen, Roy Rogers | Jose Molina, Mel Tormé |
| 4324 | December 19, 1979 | John Davidson, Charles Nelson Reilly, O. J. Simpson, Joyce Van Patten | N/A |
Sketch- "Robby the Roll"; Desk- "Fan Mail"
| 4325 | December 20, 1979 | Bruce Dern, David Letterman | Judith Blegen ("O Holy Night") |
Desk- "Unusual Christmas Gifts"; New Products
| 4326 | December 21, 1979 | Fred Astaire, Steve Landesberg, Richard Mitchell | Al Hirt |
A Tribute to Bonzo
| 4327 | December 25, 1979 | John Davidson (guest host), Ron Howard, Betty White | Lennon Sisters |
| 4328 | December 26, 1979 | John Davidson (guest host), Kreskin | Anthony Newley |
| 4329 | December 27, 1979 | John Davidson (guest host), Paul Williams, Orson Bean | N/A |
| 4330 | December 28, 1979 | John Davidson (guest host), Robert Guillaume, Dick Shawn, Dr. Lendon Smith | Charo |
| 4331 | December 31, 1979 | John Davidson (guest host), Dennis Weaver, Lynn Redgrave, Gil Gerard | Hoyt Axton |
