= List of The Tonight Show Starring Johnny Carson episodes (1978) =

Episodes in 1978

- No. of episodes: 265

Release
- Original network: NBC

Season chronology
- ← Previous; 1977 episodes Next → 1979 episodes

The following is a list of episodes of the television series The Tonight Show Starring Johnny Carson which aired in 1978. In October, 1962 Johnny Carson took over as host of the show from the previous host Jack Paar.

== 1978 ==
=== January ===
No.	Original release date	Guest(s)	Musical/entertainment guest(s)
3842	January 2, 1978	Kenny Rogers (guest host), Norm Crosby, Dub Taylor	Kris Kristofferson, Rita Coolidge
3843	January 3, 1978	Charles Nelson Reilly, Buck Henry	Pete Fountain
Desk- "New Year's Resolutions"
3844	January 4, 1978	John Davidson, Orson Bean	N/A
Aunt Blabby
3845	January 5, 1978	David Brenner, Antonio Salemme	Itzhak Perlman, Joe Williams
3846	January 6, 1978	Madlyn Rhue, Alan King, David Horowitz	Helen Reddy
3847	January 9, 1978	George Carlin (guest host), Hal Linden, Carol Lawrence, Kelly Monteith	N/A
3848	January 10, 1978	John Byner, Suzanne Somers, Bo Svenson	N/A
Desk- "Personalized License Plates for Celebrities"
3849	January 11, 1978	Tony Randall, Marsha Mason, Dr. Paul Ehrlich	Donna Theodore
Carnac the Magnificent
3850	January 12, 1978	Susan Sarandon, Red Buttons, Anne Hoffman	Anthony Newley
Floyd R. Turbo- "Against Endangered Species Protection"
3851	January 13, 1978	Buddy Hackett, Peter O'Toole, William Demarest, Victor Buono	N/A
Desk- "Phobias"
3852	January 16, 1978	Helen Reddy (guest host), George Gobel, Dr. Joyce Brothers	Robert Goulet
3853	January 17, 1978	Jim Fowler, George Peppard, David Steinberg	Linda Hopkins
Stump the Band
3854	January 18, 1978	Peter Strauss, Robert Klein, Caren Kaye	William Walker
3855	January 19, 1978	William Devane, Paul Williams, Shecky Greene, Cyra McFadden	N/A
Sketch- "Weatherman" (It rains on set as part of comedy gag.)
3856	January 20, 1978	Diahann Carroll, Charlie Callas, Don "Red" Barry	Judith Blegen
Johnny shows film clip of attempted 50 men link up on the air by sky divers, after clip Johnny brings out photographer Carl Banish for bow.
3857	January 23, 1978	David Brenner (guest host), Jack Palance	Lou Rawls
3858	January 24, 1978	David Brenner (guest host), Bob Uecker	Neil Sedaka
3859	January 25, 1978	David Brenner (guest host), Cleveland Amory, Beverly Sanders	N/A
3860	January 26, 1978	David Brenner (guest host)	Charo
3861	January 27, 1978	David Brenner (guest host), Arnold Schwarzenegger	Liberace
3862	January 30, 1978	Bob Newhart (guest host), Dr. Lendon Smith	N/A
3863	January 31, 1978	Henry Winkler, Rodney Dangerfield, Gretchen Corbett	Los Indios Tabajaras
Desk- "Diet Books"

=== February ===
No.	Original release date	Guest(s)	Musical/entertainment guest(s)
3864	February 1, 1978	Gabriel Kaplan, Cloris Leachman, Marcel Marceau	N/A
Carnac the Magnificent, Johnny & Ed lead the audience in a spontaneous rendition of "The Star-Spangled Banner".
3865	February 2, 1978	Carl Reiner, Jack Klugman, Jan Todd	Kasey Cisyk
Desk- Johnny does a self-defense skit & explains the etymology of "dressed to the nines" & other British phrases.
3866	February 3, 1978	Joan Rivers, David Susskind, Merie Earle	Vic Damone
Sketch- "Russian Satellite"
3867	February 6, 1978	Bill Cosby (guest host), Kreskin	Loretta Lynn
3868	February 7, 1978	Garson Kanin, Ed Lieberthal	Britt Ekland, Mel Tillis
3869	February 8, 1978	Jay Leno, Charles Nelson Reilly, Norman Fell	Tony Bennett
Desk-Johnny demonstrates the snow and smoke machine on the Tonight Show backdrop set.
3870	February 9, 1978	Jill Ireland, Pete Barbutti, Dr. Robert Jastrow	Johnny Mathis
Sketch- "Abe Lincoln"
3871	February 10, 1978	Bob Hope, Dr. William Nolen	Carol Neblett, Lola Falana
Desk- "How to Be a Better Lover"
3872	February 13, 1978	Roy Clark (guest host), Sandy Duncan, Foster Brooks	Glen Campbell
3873	February 14, 1978	Earl Holliman, Steve Landesberg, Bridget Boland	Bobby Goldsboro
Desk-"Valentine Cards from Children"
3874	February 15, 1978	Walter Matthau	Al Hirt
Desk-"How to Survive a Snowstorm"
3875	February 16, 1978	Orson Bean, Mary Livingstone	Monti Rock
Sketch- "Man Charges Wife Money for Sex"
3876	February 17, 1978	Jack Webb, Elizabeth Ashley	Buddy Rich, Marilyn Horne
Sketch- "Gene Shallow Movie Review"
3877	February 20, 1978	Steve Martin (guest host), Steve Allen, Elke Sommer, Andy Kaufman	Kenny Rogers
3878	February 21, 1978	Robert Blake, Red Buttons, Johnny Yune	Gladys Knight & The Pips
Desk- "How to Avoid the Flu"
3879	February 22, 1978	Goldie Hawn, Buck Henry, Dennis Dugan	N/A
Sketch: George Washington is interviewed by Ed McMahon; Johnny reads an Oregon classified ad for missing dentures, and quizzes Ed on celebrities' real names; scheduled musical guest Stan Getz was unavailable due to bad weather cancelling his flight
3880	February 23, 1978	Richard Benjamin, David Steinberg	Marilyn Maye
Desk- "Letters"; Johnny demonstrates sea monster on Lake Carson backdrop of the Tonight Show set.
3881	February 24, 1978	Peter Falk, Fernando Lamas, Dorothy Fuldheim	Chuck Mangione
Sketch- "New Wave Author"
3882	February 27, 1978	Tom Smothers (guest host), Shelley Winters	Ben Vereen
3883	February 28, 1978	Joan Embery, Susan Clark, Kelly Monteith, Barbara Howar	N/A
Carnac the Magnificent

=== March ===
No.	Original release date	Guest(s)	Musical/entertainment guest(s)
3884	March 1, 1978	Cheryl Ladd, Don Rickles, Ray Bradbury	N/A
Desk- "Soap Opera Shows"
3885	March 2, 1978	Bruce Dern, Robert Klein, Susan Sullivan, Dr. Carl Sagan	N/A
Sketch- "Canadian Mouse"
3886	March 3, 1978	Shirley MacLaine, Cheryl Tiegs	Ronny Graham, Stan Getz
Stump the Band
3887	March 6, 1978	Bill Cosby (guest host), Sally Kellerman	N/A
3888	March 7, 1978	Bill Cosby (guest host), Teri Garr	N/A
3889	March 8, 1978	Bill Cosby (guest host), Dr. Joyce Brothers	Freddy Fender
3890	March 9, 1978	George Carlin (guest host)	Sarah Vaughan
3891	March 10, 1978	George Carlin (guest host), Joan Rivers, Dick Shawn, George Plimpton	N/A
3892	March 13, 1978	Rich Little (guest host), Sandy Duncan, George Gobel	Linda Hopkins, Robert Goulet
3893	March 14, 1978	Charlton Heston, Charles Nelson Reilly, Thalassa Cruso	Helen Schneider
Desk-"Theory of Relativity"; Desk-"Winners of Clio Awards for Best Commercials"
3894	March 15, 1978	John Davidson, Jodie Foster, Johnny Yune, Sam Blotner	John Davidson ("I Can't Smile Without You" and "You Light Up My Life")
Aunt Blabby
3895	March 16, 1978	Mel Brooks, Carol Lawrence	N/A
Desk- "Answers to Test Questions by Elementary School Children"
3896	March 17, 1978	David Brinkley, Arlene Francis, Bert Convy	N/A
Desk- "T-Shirts for Dogs"
3897	March 20, 1978	David Brenner (guest host), Tom Smothers	N/A
3898	March 21, 1978	none	N/A
3899	March 22, 1978	Jane Seymour, Rodney Dangerfield, David Horowitz	Kenny Rogers
Desk- "Police Radio Codes"
3900	March 23, 1978	Walter Matthau, Bob Uecker, Dr. Michael Fox	Dee Dee Bridgewater
Desk- "How Various Animals 'Turn-On' Sexually"
3901	March 24, 1978	Milton Berle, Donna Pyle, Dr. Lendon Smith	Marilyn Horne
Commercial Blackouts: Takeoffs of: "RCA Colortrak", "Easy-Off", and "Schlitz Lite Beer".
3902	March 27, 1978	Bob Newhart (guest host), Kelly Monteith	Anthony Newley
3903	March 28, 1978	none	N/A
3904	March 29, 1978	Buddy Hackett, Claudia Jennings, Dr. William Nolen	Pat Boone
Blackout Sketch- "King Tut"
3905	March 30, 1978	Orson Bean, Joanna Cassidy, Robert Easton, Beverly Dahlke	Joe Williams
3906	March 31, 1978	Jack Klugman, George Best, Erica Jong	Roger Miller
Sketch- "Toto the Dog"

=== April ===
No.	Original release date	Guest(s)	Musical/entertainment guest(s)
3907	April 3, 1978	Bob Newhart (guest host), Dick Shawn, Ray Johnson	N/A
3908	April 4, 1978	none	N/A
3909	April 5, 1978	Joan Rivers, Fred Astaire, Jack Douglas	Gloria Loring
Floyd R. Turbo- "Editorial Reply on Mandatory Retirement"
3910	April 6, 1978	George Peppard, Frank Abagnale	Pete Fountain
Sketch- "Lou Gehrig Farewell Address"
3911	April 7, 1978	Robert Mitchum, Dick Van Patten, George Miller, Dennis Madalone	N/A
3912	April 10, 1978	Rich Little (guest host), Debbie Reynolds, Fernando Lamas	N/A
3913	April 11, 1978	none	N/A
3914	April 12, 1978	Paul Williams, Gore Vidal	N/A
Sketch- "Ask Mr. Dilly"
3915	April 13, 1978	Bob Hope, Joseph Wambaugh	Lola Falana
Carnac the Magnificent
3916	April 14, 1978	Elizabeth Ashley, Steve Garvey, Johnny Yune	Engelbert Humperdinck
Johnny displays gag 'Le Draught' wine bottle; Mighty Carson Art Players- "Jacque Coocoo"
3917	April 17, 1978	Robert Klein (guest host), Dick Clark	Eartha Kitt
3918	April 18, 1978	Don Rickles (guest host), Robert Blake, Bruce Jenner	N/A
3919	April 19, 1978	Don Rickles (guest host), Shecky Greene	Peggy Lee
3920	April 20, 1978	Don Rickles (guest host), Tony Curtis, Phyllis Diller, Tommy Lasorda	Skiles and Henderson, Scatman Crothers
3921	April 21, 1978	George Carlin (guest host), Tom Smothers, Dr. Michael Fox	Roger Miller
3922	April 24, 1978	George Carlin (guest host), Kreskin	Jack Jones
3923	April 25, 1978	George Carlin (guest host), Wayne Rogers, Kip Addotta	N/A
3924	April 26, 1978	Roy Clark (guest host), Doug Henning, Victor Buono	Natalie Cole
3925	April 27, 1978	Roy Clark (guest host), Rich Little, Norman Fell	N/A
3926	April 28, 1978	Roy Clark (guest host), John Davidson, George Gobel	N/A

=== May ===
No.	Original release date	Guest(s)	Musical/entertainment guest(s)
3927	May 1, 1978	David Steinberg (guest host), Flip Wilson, Dom DeLuise	Helen Reddy
3928	May 2, 1978	Sammy Davis, Jr.	Sammy Davis, Jr. ("Once In a Lifetime", "Mr. Bojangles" and "Life Is a Woman"), Char Fontane
Aunt Blabby
3929	May 3, 1978	Buddy Hackett, Dr. Paul Ehrlich	Donna Theodore
Sketch- "Laszlo Wartstuler- World's Greatest Director"
3930	May 4, 1978	Gabriel Kaplan (guest host), Norm Crosby	Connie Stevens
Desk- "'Do You Ever Wonder If..' Jokes"
3931	May 5, 1978	Gabriel Kaplan (guest host), Patrick Duffy, Barbara Eden, George Plimpton	N/A
3932	May 8, 1978	Gabriel Kaplan (guest host), Joan Rivers, Richard Lewis	Kenny Rogers
Stump the Comedian with Gabriel Kaplan
3933	May 9, 1978	none	N/A
3934	May 10, 1978	Erma Bombeck	Mac Davis
Floyd R. Turbo- "Editorial Reply About the 55 M.P.H. Speed Limit"
3935	May 11, 1978	Carl Reiner, Florence Henderson	Monti Rock
3936	May 12, 1978	Rich Little, Jean Marsh, McLean Stevenson, Dr. Lendon Smith	N/A
Mighty Carson Art Players- "Take-off of 'Mister Rogers' Neighborhood'"
3937	May 15, 1978	Orson Welles (guest host), Vincent Price, Teri Garr	N/A
3938	May 16, 1978	Bess Armstrong, Bob Speca, David Horowitz	Tony Bennett
Desk- "Foreign Commercials"
3939	May 17, 1978	Jane Fonda, Charlie Callas, Dr. Carl Sagan	Ethel Merman ("Gee, But It's Good To Be Here")
Carnac the Magnificent
3940	May 18, 1978	Fernando Lamas, Bert Convy, Joanna Cameron	Eubie Blake
Desk- "Television Pilots That Didn't Make It"
3941	May 19, 1978	Robert Blake, Dorothy Fuldheim	Kellee Patterson, Ronny Graham
Commercial Blackouts: "Quotal Cereal", and a take-off on a pantyhose commercial.
3942	May 22, 1978	John Davidson (guest host), Betty White, Ken Norton	Jim Nabors
3943	May 23, 1978	Burt Reynolds, Monte Vanton	Johnny Mathis
Stump the Band
3944	May 24, 1978	Shecky Greene, Shelley Hack	Buddy Rich, Donna Theodore
Desk- "What is Suspicious"
3945	May 25, 1978	Orson Bean, Bob Uecker, Dr. Joyce Brothers	Eugene Fodor
El Mouldo
3946	May 26, 1978	George Gobel, Frank Abagnale	Helen Reddy, Pete Fountain
Mighty Carson Art Players- "Indy 500"
3947	May 29, 1978	George Carlin (guest host), Kip Addotta, Dr. Art Ulene	Della Reese
3948	May 30, 1978	none	N/A
3949	May 31, 1978	Tony Randall, David Sayh, Shelley Winters	N/A
Desk- "How to Make an Impression At An Interview"

=== June ===
No.	Original release date	Guest(s)	Musical/entertainment guest(s)
3950	June 1, 1978	Bill Cosby, Dick Van Patten, Mariel Aragon	N/A
Sketch- "Murray the Mouse"
3951	June 2, 1978	James Coco, Kelly Monteith, Barbara Howar	Leonard Waxdeck & The Birdcallers
Desk- "Ways to Skimp in the State Budget"
3952	June 5, 1978	Burt Reynolds (guest host), Carol Burnett, James Brolin	Roger Miller
Desk- "Blue Cards"
3953	June 6, 1978	Burt Reynolds (guest host), Orson Welles, Sandy Duncan, David Steinberg, Dub Taylor	Linda Hopkins
Desk- "Blue Cards"
3954	June 7, 1978	Burt Reynolds (guest host), Roy Rogers, Norman Fell	Wayne Newton
3955	June 8, 1978	Burt Reynolds (guest host), Charles Nelson Reilly	Lola Falana
3956	June 9, 1978	Burt Reynolds (guest host), Madeline Kahn, Dr. William Nolen	N/A
Desk- "Blue Cards"
3957	June 12, 1978	Bob Newhart (guest host), James Hampton	Vikki Carr, Mel Tillis
3958	June 13, 1978	none	N/A
3959	June 14, 1978	Suzanne Pleshette, Patrick Duffy	Donna Summer ("Last Dance" and "I Love You")
Desk-"How to Keep a Happy Marriage"
3960	June 15, 1978	Jim Fowler, Jenny Agutter	Phyllis Newman
Mighty Carson Art Players- "Post Office"
3961	June 16, 1978	Ann-Margret, Robert Mitchum, Gary Morgan, Tom Dreesen, Joseph N. Sorrentino	N/A
Floyd R. Turbo- "Editorial Reply About the Olympics in Los Angeles"
3962	June 19, 1978	Steve Martin (guest host), Richard Pryor, Robert Logan	Bernadette Peters, Glen Campbell
Steve Martin sings 'King Tut'.
3963	June 20, 1978	none	N/A
3964	June 21, 1978	Tony Curtis, Steve Landesberg, Bess Armstrong, Merie Earle	N/A
Carnac the Magnificent
3965	June 22, 1978	Marsha Mason, Rodney Dangerfield	Benny Goodman
Desk- "Fascinating Facts"
3966	June 23, 1978	Elizabeth Ashley, Johnny Yune, Buck Henry, Tim Severin	N/A
Desk- "The Encyclopedia of How Long Things Take"
3967	June 26, 1978	John Davidson (guest host), Angie Dickinson	Skiles and Henderson, Linda Hopkins
3968	June 27, 1978	John Davidson (guest host), Elke Sommer, Kip Addotta	The Carpenters ("Thank You for the Music", "Superstar", "Goodbye to Love"), Cubby O'Brien
3969	June 28, 1978	John Davidson (guest host), Susan Saint James, Jerry Van Dyke	Jim Stafford
3970	June 29, 1978	John Davidson (guest host), Elliott Gould	N/A
3971	June 30, 1978	John Davidson (guest host), Rob Reiner	Anthony Newley

=== July ===
No.	Original release date	Guest(s)	Musical/entertainment guest(s)
3972	July 3, 1978	George Carlin (guest host), George Hamilton, George Plimpton	Eartha Kitt
3973	July 4, 1978	George Carlin (guest host), Martin Mull, George Gobel	N/A
3974	July 5, 1978	McLean Stevenson (guest host), William Shatner, Shelley Hack, Pete Barbutti, Dr. Joyce Brothers, Jim Bailey	Jose Feliciano
3975	July 6, 1978	Bob Newhart (guest host), George C. Scott, Gallagher, Dr. Lendon Smith	N/A
3976	July 7, 1978	Bob Newhart (guest host), Henry Fonda	Kenny Rogers
3977	July 10, 1978	David Steinberg (guest host)	Ken Page
3978	July 11, 1978	Robert Klein (guest host), Orson Bean, Jack Gilford	N/A
3979	July 12, 1978	Robert Klein (guest host), Vincent Price	Itzhak Perlman
Robert Klein plugs his new film, 'Hooper'.
3980	July 13, 1978	Rich Little (guest host), Tom Bosley	N/A
3981	July 14, 1978	Rich Little (guest host), James Stewart, Kelly Monteith, Loretta Swit, Dr. William Nolen	N/A
3982	July 17, 1978	McLean Stevenson (guest host)	Donna Theodore
3983	July 18, 1978	none	N/A
3984	July 19, 1978	Sandy Duncan, Howard Jarvis	Carol Neblett
3985	July 20, 1978	Donna Hois, Bruce Jenner, Marilu Tolo, Ray Johnson	Joe Williams ("Young Man on the Way Up")
3986	July 21, 1978	Richard Pryor, Dorothy Fuldheim	Dave Brubeck Quartet
Sketch- "Morris the Cat"
3987	July 24, 1978	Kenny Rogers (guest host), Dr. Michael Fox	N/A
3988	July 25, 1978	none	N/A
3989	July 26, 1978	Joan Embery, Jean Marsh, Nancy Lopez	Andrea McArdle ("Hopelessly Devoted to You" and "Tomorrow")
Floyd R. Turbo- "Editorial Reply About Smoking in Restaurants"
3990	July 27, 1978	Angie Dickinson, Bobby Kelton, David Horowitz	Marilyn Horne
Desk- "Free Thing to Do in Los Angeles"
3991	July 28, 1978	McLean Stevenson, Charles Nelson Reilly, Bill Kirchenbauer, Dr. Lendon Smith	N/A
Stump the Band
3992	July 31, 1978	Bob Newhart (guest host), Susan Saint James, Jay Leno	Bernadette Peters, Harry Chapin

=== August ===
No.	Original release date	Guest(s)	Musical/entertainment guest(s)
3993	August 1, 1978	none	N/A
3994	August 2, 1978	Burt Reynolds, Susan Sarandon, Andrew Tobias	N/A
Desk- "How to Pick a Wife"
3995	August 3, 1978	Fernando Lamas, Gallagher	Peggy Lee
Carnac the Magnificent
3996	August 4, 1978	George Carlin, Charles Frank, Ralph Rector	Lola Falana
Desk- "Tips on How to Save Money"
3997	August 7, 1978	Rob Reiner (guest host), Billy Crystal, Tommy Lasorda	N/A
3998	August 8, 1978	none	N/A
3999	August 9, 1978	Dean Martin, Erma Bombeck, Martin Mull	Johnny Mathis ("Copacabana", "Pieces of Dreams")
4000	August 10, 1978	David Steinberg	Roger Miller
The 4,000th episode of The Tonight Show Starring Johnny Carson airs.
4001	August 11, 1978	Farrah Fawcett, Charlie Callas, Brooke Shields	Buddy Rich, Ed Shaughnessy
Desk- "How to Get Over a Heartache"
4002	August 14, 1978	David Brenner (guest host), Elizabeth Ashley, Kelly Monteith	N/A
4003	August 15, 1978	none	N/A
4004	August 16, 1978	Betty White, John Byner, Johnny Yune, Merie Earle	N/A
Doc's race horses; The 100 most influential people in history.
4005	August 17, 1978	Ardath Evitt, Bess Armstrong, Bobby Kelton, Elia Kazan	N/A
Desk- "National Lampoon Sunday Supplement"
4006	August 18, 1978	Buck Henry, Jack Douglas, Marilu Tolo	Larry Gatlin
Stump the Band
4007	August 21, 1978	Bob Newhart (guest host), Don Rickles, Dr. Joyce Brothers	N/A
4008	August 22, 1978	Bob Newhart (guest host), Suzanne Somers, Dr. Michael Fox	N/A
4009	August 23, 1978	Bill Cosby (guest host), Mary Louise Weller, Adrienne Barbeau	Paul Anka, Pete Fountain
4010	August 24, 1978	Robert Klein (guest host), Teri Garr, Dr. Wayne Dyer	Hudson Brothers
4011	August 25, 1978	Rich Little (guest host), James Garner, Kip Addotta, Fred Travalena	N/A

=== September ===
No.	Original release date	Guest(s)	Musical/entertainment guest(s)
4012	September 4, 1978	George Carlin (guest host), Frank Langella	Connie Stevens, Jim Stafford
4013	September 5, 1978	none	N/A
4014	September 6, 1978	Peter Strauss, Charles Nelson Reilly	Britt Ekland, Los Indios Tabajaras
Aunt Blabby
4015	September 7, 1978	Florence Henderson, Patrick Duffy, Marvin Hamlisch	N/A
Desk- "The Soaps"
4016	September 8, 1978	Elizabeth Ashley, Dan Haggerty	Gene Bertoncini, Helen Schneider
4017	September 11, 1978	George Carlin (guest host), Joan Rivers, Joe Garagiola	Joel Grey
4018	September 12, 1978	none	N/A
4019	September 13, 1978	Jack Albertson, Tony Delia, William Peter Blatty	Dolly Parton
Carnac the Magnificent
4020	September 14, 1978	Phyllis George	Mel Tillis, Donna Theodore
Desk- "Letters from Viewers"
4021	September 15, 1978	Shecky Greene, Barbara Howar, Jim Bouton	Chuck Mangione, Placido Domingo
Floyd R. Turbo- "Editorial Reply in Opposition to National Health Insurance"
4022	September 18, 1978	Rich Little (guest host), Dick Clark, Norm Crosby, Kreskin	Rita Moreno
4023	September 19, 1978	none	N/A
4024	September 20, 1978	Jack Klugman, George Plimpton, Tom Dreesen	Kellee Patterson
Behind the Scenes of The Tonight Show
4025	September 21, 1978	Joe Namath, Jim Fowler	Kenny Rogers & Dottie West ("The Gambler", "Anyone Who Isn't Me Tonight")
Desk- "Courses Offers from the University of Burbank" (i.e. speed eating, modern dance for animals, history of coughing, and aborigine playwrights.)
4026	September 22, 1978	Tim Conway, Angie Dickinson, George Miller, Andrew Tobias	N/A
Sketch- "Foreman of the Nuclear Power Plant Interview"
4027	September 25, 1978	Steve Martin (guest host), Burt Reynolds, Cheryl Ladd, Steve Landesberg	N/A
4028	September 26, 1978	Don Rickles (guest host), Suzanne Somers	Ben Vereen
4029	September 27, 1978	Don Rickles (guest host), Sandy Duncan, Robert Conrad	N/A
4030	September 28, 1978	Don Rickles (guest host), Burt Hooton, Dub Taylor	Della Reese
4031	September 29, 1978	none	N/A

=== October ===
No.	Original release date	Guest(s)	Musical/entertainment guest(s)
4032	October 2, 1978	Sammy Davis, Jr. (guest host)	Sarah Vaughan
4033	October 3, 1978	none	N/A
4044	October 4, 1978	Frank Abagnale, Donny Osmond, Marie Osmond, Kelly Monteith	Senor Wences
Desk- "Ways to Combat Loneliness"
4045	October 5, 1978	Betty White, Robert Morley	Monti Rock, Monteith and Rand
Mighty Carson Art Players- "Woman Reporter in Men's Locker Room"
4046	October 6, 1978	Dick Van Patten, Dr. Lendon Smith	Bob & Ray, Luciano Pavarotti
Desk- "Celebrity Donations for the Smithsonian Institution"
4047	October 9, 1978	Beverly Sills (guest host), Carol Burnett, Shecky Greene, Fernando Lamas, Charles Nelson Reilly	N/A
4048	October 10, 1978	none	N/A
4049	October 11, 1978	Jean Marsh, Yacov Noy, Dr. Paul Ehrlich	Donna Summer
Carnac the Magnificent
4050	October 12, 1978	David Steinberg, John Bennett, Marianne Broome	Kelly Garrett
Desk- "Dreamer's Dictionary"
4051	October 13, 1978	Bob Hope, Robert Blake, Bobby Kelton, Ray Johnson	N/A
Commercial Blackouts: 1. Comparative Advertising; 2. Institutional Advertising; 3. Celebrities Endorsing Advertising; and 4. Recording Tape.
4052	October 16, 1978	John Denver (guest host), John Ritter, Jay Leno, Ellen Burstyn	N/A
4053	October 17, 1978	none	N/A
4054	October 18, 1978	Gregory Peck, Martin Mull, Robert Easton	Judith Blegen
Desk- "What To Do When Buying a Used Car"
4055	October 19, 1978	Rob Reiner, Lit Connah, Carol Wayne	Dizzy Gillespie
Mighty Carson Art Players- "Tea-Time Movie"
4056	October 20, 1978	Elizabeth Ashley, Johnny Yune, David Horowitz	Steve Lawrence
The Edge of Wetness
4057	October 23, 1978	David Brenner (guest host)	N/A
4058	October 24, 1978	David Brenner (guest host)	N/A
4059	October 25, 1978	David Brenner (guest host)	N/A
4060	October 26, 1978	David Brenner (guest host)	N/A
4061	October 27, 1978	David Brenner (guest host)	N/A
4062	October 30, 1978	David Brenner (guest host), McLean Stevenson, Pete Barbutti	Bernadette Peters
4063	October 31, 1978	none	N/A

=== November ===
No.	Original release date	Guest(s)	Musical/entertainment guest(s)
4064	November 1, 1978	Patrick Duffy, Rodney Dangerfield, Dr. Carl Sagan	Carol Neblett
Desk- "Superstitions"
4065	November 2, 1978	Bess Armstrong	N/A
Desk- "Christmas Shopping Tips"
4066	November 3, 1978	Mary Tyler Moore, Beverly Johnson	Anthony Newley
Mighty Carson Art Players- "Politics"
4067	November 6, 1978	Don Rickles (guest host)	Charo, Gladys Knight & The Pips
4068	November 7, 1978	none	N/A
4069	November 8, 1978	Charlton Heston, Charlie Callas, Lesley Ann Warren, Julia Child	N/A
Desk- "Yes or No Propositions"
4070	November 9, 1978	Harvey Korman, Gary Coleman, Lilli Palmer	Larry Gatlin
Floyd R. Turbo- "Rebuttal in Favor of Legalized Gambling"
4071	November 10, 1978	John Davidson, Charles Nelson Reilly, Dorothy Fuldheim, A.L. Rowe	N/A
4072	November 13, 1978	Don Rickles (guest host), Carroll O'Connor, Bobby Ramsen	Jose Molina, Peter Marshall
4073	November 14, 1978	Buddy Hackett, Anthony Hopkins	Billy Davis, Jr., Marilyn McCoo
Carnac the Magnificent; Stump the Band
4074	November 15, 1978	Angie Dickinson, Robert Klein, Erma Bombeck	Linda Hopkins
Desk- "Qualifications for Seeking Status"
4075	November 16, 1978	Sylvester Stallone, Bobby Kelton, Thalassa Cruso	Kenny Rogers
The Edge of Wetness
4076	November 17, 1978	Jill Ireland	Pete Fountain
4077	November 20, 1978	Gabriel Kaplan (guest host), Robert Urich	Stephen Bishop
4078	November 21, 1978	Anthony Quinn, Steve Martin, Paul Williams	N/A
Desk- "Gifts For a Person Who Has Everything"
4079	November 22, 1978	Susan Saint James, Fernando Lamas, Calvin Trillin	Donna Theodore
Sketch- "Thanksgiving Turkey"
4080	November 23, 1978	Charlie Hill	Roger Miller
4081	November 24, 1978	James Garner, Ellen Burstyn, David Letterman, Rod Dornsife	N/A
4082	November 27, 1978	Don Rickles (guest host), Arte Johnson, Elke Sommer	Glen Campbell
4083	November 28, 1978	Richard Benjamin, Martin Mull, Dr. Lendon Smith	Joe Williams
Desk- "New Etiquette/Manner List"
4084	November 29, 1978	Buck Henry, F. Lee Bailey	Andy Williams
Desk- "Commonly Mispronounced Words"; Mighty Carson Art Players- "G. Walter Schneer- Phone Company"
4085	November 30, 1978	Cindy Williams, Shecky Greene	Anthony & Joseph Paratore
Desk- "Wild and Crazy Calendars"

=== December ===
No.	Original release date	Guest(s)	Musical/entertainment guest(s)
4086	December 1, 1978	Bob Hope, Tom Dreesen, David Horowitz	Pat Boone
Desk- "Trivia Dispatch"
4087	December 4, 1978	Bill Cosby (guest host), Sandy Duncan	Loretta Lynn, Lou Rawls
4088	December 5, 1978	Bill Cosby (guest host), Norm Crosby, George Plimpton	Mac Davis
4089	December 6, 1978	Bill Cosby (guest host), Richard Pryor, Dr. Michael Fox	Bobby Goldsboro
4090	December 7, 1978	George Carlin (guest host), Ray Johnson	Della Reese
4091	December 8, 1978	David Steinberg (guest host), Orson Bean, Susan Sarandon	Shields & Yarnell
Sketch- "David- The Psychiatrist"
4092	December 11, 1978	Bob Newhart (guest host), Debbie Reynolds, Wayne Rogers, Pete Barbutti	N/A
4093	December 12, 1978	Angie Dickinson	N/A
4094	December 13, 1978	Ann-Margret, Joan Rivers, Lou Holtz	N/A
Desk- "Letters to Santa Claus"; Johnny hosts a lingerie fashion show.
4095	December 14, 1978	Bob Hope, Red Skelton, Jean Marsh	Engelbert Humperdinck
Sketch- "Carl the Cardboard"
4096	December 15, 1978	Dan Haggerty	Phyllis Newman
4097	December 18, 1978	John Davidson (guest host), Ron Howard	N/A
4098	December 19, 1978	none	N/A
4099	December 20, 1978	Bruce Dern, Myron Cohen, Calvin Trillin	Johnny Mathis
Desk- "Employment Guidelines for Old St. Nick"
4100	December 21, 1978	Bob Hope, Dick Van Patten, Gil Fates	N/A
New Products of 1978
4101	December 22, 1978	Betty White, Bert Convy	Marilyn Horne
Mighty Carson Art Players- "The Andy Davidson Christmas Special"
4102	December 25, 1978	Patrick Duffy, Teri Garr, Vincent Price	Jim Stafford
4103	December 26, 1978	John Davidson (guest host), Phyllis Diller, Dick Clark, Kreskin	Rita Moreno
Desk- "Odds and Ends"
4104	December 27, 1978	John Davidson (guest host), Bernie Kopell, Kip Addotta	Tony Orlando
4105	December 28, 1978	John Davidson (guest host), Erik Estrada, Dr. Joyce Brothers	Vikki Carr
4106	December 29, 1978	John Davidson (guest host), Lindsay Wagner, Foster Brooks	Kenny Rogers, The Oak Ridge Boys
