= Pingala =

3rd–2nd century BC Indian mathematician and poet

- Born: c. 3rd or 2nd century BCE

Academic work
- Era: Maurya or post-Maurya
- Main interests: Sanskrit prosody, Indian mathematics, Sanskrit grammar
- Notable works: Author of the "Chandaḥśāstra" (also called Pingala Sutras), the earliest known treatise on Sanskrit prosody, Creator of Pingala's formula
- Notable ideas: Mātrāmeru, Binary numeral system, Meru Prastāra

Acharya Pingala (Sanskrit: पिङ्गल, romanized: Piṅgala; c. 3rd–2nd century BCE) was an ancient Indian scholar, poet, grammarian and mathematician whose master work Chandaḥśāstra (Sanskrit: छन्दःशास्त्र, lit. 'A Treatise on Prosody'), also called the Pingala Sutras (Sanskrit: पिङ्गलसूत्राः, romanized: Piṅgalasūtrāḥ, lit. 'Pingala's Formulae'), is the foundational text of Chandas (prosody and metrics)—one of the six Vedāngas (auxiiiary science) of traditional Indian scholarship.

The Chandaḥśāstra is a work of eight chapters written in the late Sūtra style, that relies on explanatory commentaries for full comprehension. Dated to the final centuries BCE this was elaborated in 10th century CE by Halayudha in his commentary, the Mṛtasañjīvinī. According to Indian tradition and historical accounts, Maharshi Pingala is described as the younger brother of Pāṇini, the famous Sanskrit grammarian of Vyākaraṇa. Others traditions identify him with Patanjali, the 2nd-century BCE scholar who authored the Mahābhāṣya.

== Combinatorics ==
The Chandaḥśāstra presents a recursive method to systematically enumerate metres by generating all possible combinations of light (laghu) and heavy (guru) syllables for a verse of $n$ syllables, producing a binary representation. Pingala systematized Sanskrit metrics using six algorithmic procedures known as Pratyayas:

- Prastāra (permutation/expansion): A systematic, recursive table generating all combinations of laghu (light, short) and guru (heavy, long) syllables for an $n$-syllable meter. The two syllable types can be represented as binary symbols, so the procedure corresponds mathematically to enumerating all $2^n$ binary sequences.
- Naṣṭa (Recovery): An algorithm to determine the exact syllable sequence, given the rank/index number of a meter.
- Uddiṣṭa (Indexing): The inverse algorithm to find the rank/index number of a given sequence of syllabus.
- Laghu-kriyā/Guru-kriyā (Weight determination): Computing the number of metres containing a specific count of light or heavy syllables (yielding binomial coefficients).
- Saṅkhyā (Total calculation): Determining the total number of permutations ($2^n$) for a meter of length $n$.
- Mātrā-meru/Meru-prastāra (Pyramidal arrangement): The triangular array of combinatorial binomial coefficients (later known in Europe as Pascal's triangle) and additive sequences (later known as Fibonacci numbers).

Metrical combinations generated via Prastāra for length $n$
Word length ($n$ characters)	Total meters ($2^n$)	Combinatorial sequence (Prasatāra order)
1	2	G L
2	4	GG LG GL LL
3	8	GGG LGG GLG LLG GGL LGL GLL LLL

Pingala is also credited with an early explicit use of zero, using the Sanskrit word śūnya to refer to the number. His binary system increases from left to right, rather than right to left as in modern binary notation. Four short syllables "0000" is the first pattern and corresponds to the value one. The numerical value is obtained by adding one to the sum of place values. The combinatorial rules for metres developed by Pingala that were based on moraic time units (mātrās) were the mathematical foundation for the sequence known as Fibonacci numbers in the West. This sequence of numbers was later formalized by Indian mathematicians Virahānka (c. 6th–8th century CE) and Hemachandra (c. 1150 CE), centuries prior to Fibonacci.

== Editions ==
- A. Weber, Indische Studien 8, Leipzig, 1863.
- Janakinath Kabyatittha & Brothers, Pingala Chhanda Sutram, Calcutta, 1931.
- Nirnayasagar Press, Chand Shastra, Bombay, 1938.

== See also ==
- Chandas
- Sanskrit prosody
- Indian mathematics
- Indian mathematicians
- History of the binomial theorem
- List of Indian mathematicians
