= They Still Call Me Bruce =

1987 American action comedy film

- Theatrical release poster
- Directed by: James Orr; Johnny Yune
- Written by: James Orr; Johnny Yune
- Produced by: James Orr; Johnny Yune
- Starring: Johnny Yune; Robert Guillaume; David Mendenhall; J. David Moeller; Mabe Applebe; Bethany Wright
- Music by: Morton Stevens
- Distributed by: Shapiro Entertainment
- Release date: May 1987
- Running time: 91 minutes
- Country: United States
- Language: English

They Still Call Me Bruce is a 1987 American action comedy film directed by James Orr and Johnny Yune and starring the latter. It is a sequel to the 1982 film They Call Me Bruce?

== Plot ==
The film begins with Bruce in Houston on a search for the American G.I. who helped Bruce when he was just a child in Korea. With little more than a name and a fuzzy memory of his hero, Bruce is determined to find G.I. Ernie Brown to thank and repay him with an antique Korean vase. After following a few dead-end leads, Bruce meets the students of a local karate studio, who introduce him to their martial-arts master, Master McLean. Thinking Bruce to be a karate master, McLean convinces Bruce to run the studio in his place while he takes care of some business. Bruce, accepting the role, dons a black belt and with his own goofy yet clever tricks convinces the students of his skills. While teaching, Bruce develops a bond with a young orphan and student, Billy, and eventually takes up a fatherly role and begins to mentor him.

During his free time, Bruce continues his search for Ernie Brown, which leads him to the massage parlor of the crime boss Mr. B. Before he can even meet with him, Bruce steps up in defense of Polly, one of the girls on Mr. B's payroll. Thwarting Mr. B's goon from harassing her, Bruce and Polly make a quick exit, Bruce unfortunately leaving his antique vase behind. The goons, fearful of the wrath of their boss, decide to give the vase to Mr. B as a gift in hopes his fury will be diminished. Upon seeing the vase, Mr. B develops a strange look as he exclaims that he has not seen a vase like it since the Korean War.

Bruce plays a game of hide and seek as the goons try their best to track down Polly, all the while in the background being followed by a detective investigating Mr. B. Many near misses and humorous situations occur, as Bruce and Polly evade the goons and try to recover the vase, including a dancer challenging Bruce's skills in a club to Bruce's misunderstanding and misusing of a gesture that he gives to a motorcycle gang, and even a mad bull that gives Bruce a ride into town. The climax begins when Mr. B's goons finally locate and kidnap Polly and knock over young Billy, causing him to hit his head and go into a coma.

With his young friend in a coma, Bruce sets out to find and rescue Polly, but he is discovered during his attempt and confronted by Mr. B. Upon hearing the goons' exaggerated claims of Bruce's skill, Mr. B makes Bruce a deal to pit Bruce against his champion fighter—the Executioner—with the agreement that if he wins, Polly and the vase will be returned. Bruce accepts the challenge and is soon in the ring, face to face with the massive and brutal Executioner. Of course, due to his lack of skill and the threat of Mr. B, Bruce is no match for the brutal fighter. At the last moment, though, Billy, having awakened from his coma and seeing Bruce fighting on television, wobbles to the ring and inspires his mentor to put on a sock and "Sock it to him". With this new determination, Bruce defeats the Executioner.

Mr. B, unhappy with Bruce's win, tries to go back on his deal, but is quickly surprised and arrested by the investigating detective.

Polly and Billy, joining Bruce in the ring, return his vase and congratulate Bruce on his victory. Much to their surprise, Bruce seems unhappy and he reveals the realization that Mr. B was his childhood hero Ernie Brown, but much to Bruce's surprise, the detective rushes into the ring, and calling Bruce by the name his hero gave him, announces he is actually the Ernie "Slim" Brown that Bruce had met as a child, but could not reveal this earlier due to being deep undercover. The reunion is sweet and swift; Bruce thanks him, gives him the vase, and the credits roll.
