= They Call Me Bruce? =

1982 American action comedy film

- Theatrical release poster
- Directed by: Elliott Hong
- Written by: David B. Randolph, Tim Clawson
- Starring: Johnny Yune; Margaux Hemingway; Pam Huntington; Ralph Mauro
- Cinematography: Robert Primes
- Music by: Tommy Vig
- Distributed by: Film Ventures International
- Release date: 1982
- Running time: 87 minutes
- Country: United States
- Language: English
- Box office: $16,894,678 or $6.9 million

They Call Me Bruce? (also known as They Call Me Bruce) is a 1982 American action comedy film directed by Elliott Hong, written by David B. Randolph and starring Johnny Yune and Margaux Hemingway. A parody of kung fu movies, it became a sleeper hit.

The film was followed by a sequel, They Still Call Me Bruce (1987), which also starred Johnny Yune.

== Plot ==
The film opens with a young boy running to meet his grandfather (played by Yune), who lies dying on his bed. The young boy sadly explains that he could not find the medicine required to cure his grandfather's ailment and wonders aloud who will take care of him after his grandfather dies. His dying grandfather attempts to reassure the young boy and explains that he should go to America. He further explains that when he was younger and working as a merchant marine, he met "the most beautiful girl" in America and tells the young boy that if he goes there, she will take very good care of him. As the young boy is asking how to find her, his grandfather dies and the film fades to black.

When it fades back in, quite some time has passed and the young boy, who is now an adult, has arrived in America and has begun working as a chef, catering to some gangsters in California. The gangsters, who call the man "Bruce" due to his resemblance to the famed martial artist Bruce Lee, are having trouble keeping their "boss of bosses" happy and are trying to come up with the perfect solution to distributing cocaine to all of their clients throughout the United States. Some previous attempts at moving the drug have resulted in busts and the boss of bosses is not happy.

Through a series of misunderstandings, Bruce makes it into the local newspaper as a hero, having thwarted an attempted robbery at the local market. Bruce's boss, Lil' Pete, sees the newspaper and quickly devises a plan, putting Bruce in control of moving the cocaine across the country and using Freddy, a stooge associated with the drug lords, as Bruce's limousine chauffeur. He convinces Bruce (who already wants to go to New York City to find the lady of whom his grandfather spoke) that he should drive to New York, not fly, as flying would rob him of seeing the beautiful countryside. Bruce agrees, and the rest of the film follows an unknowing Bruce delivering what he thinks to be Chinese flour to associates of the gangsters across the country, and the interactions he has with the people on this trip.

== Cast ==
Actor	Role
Johnny Yune	Bruce/Grandfather
Margaux Hemingway	Karmen
Raf Mauro	Freddy
Pam Huntington	Anita
Martin Azarow	Big Al
Tony Brande	Boss of Bosses
Bill Capizzi	Lil' Pete
Harvey Vernon	Officer Hangten
Heshimu Cumbuka	Curtis
Bob Hannah	Officer Carp
Phil Rubenstein	Vito Brazzi
Howard Mann	Joe the Finger
Ric Mancini	Don Atelli
Lou Tiano	Bugey
Philip Simms	Baby Moe
Nick Cinardo	Restaurant Boss
Chuck Mitchell	Bartender
John Fujioka	Master
René Le Vant	Reverend
Harvey Levine	Cashier
Vidonne Sayre Linn	Angela
David McCharen	Cowboy on Horse
Corinne Bohrer	Cowgirl Suzie
Geoff Parks	Texan Bartender
Robert Rovin	Chemist
Reggie Montgomery	Young Black Man

== Releases ==
The film was given a limited release theatrically in the United States by Film Ventures International and Canada in November 1982. Despite never being in more than 325 theaters, the film was a surprise success and grossed $16,894,678 at the box office.

== Reception ==
Roger Ebert of The Chicago Sun-Times gave the film a mixed 2-star review. He wrote They Call Me Bruce? had a few funny scenes, but the main flaw was being "a satire of a nearly satire-proof genre. Real kung-fu movies are so implausible and so inane that it's hard to make a satire".

== Home video ==
A DVD of the film was released on April 29, 2003 by Madacy Entertainment, with some minor changes. Various scenes were cut, one of which was the removal of a short scene of nudity involving a woman disrobing while Bruce is in a hot tub.

A 25th-Anniversary DVD edition of They Call Me Bruce? was released on June 30, 2009, by Liberation Entertainment. The film is a high-quality transfer from a newly discovered 35 mm print, which the studio calls "pristine", and also restores the scenes that were cut from the original DVD release.
