= Josiah Mitchell Morse =

American writer and literary critic (1912–2004)

Josiah Mitchell Morse (January 14, 1912 – December 25, 2004), known professionally as J. Mitchell Morse, was an American writer, professor, and literary critic. He was one of the first James Joyce scholars in the United States, and helped establish Joyce in the American literary canon.

== Life ==
Morse received his Bachelor of Arts degree from the University of South Carolina in 1932. (Note: Morse’s obituary says 1933, but the master’s thesis says he earned his Bachelor of Arts in 1932.) In 1933, he earned a master's degree in English from USC with his thesis Eugene O’Neill and the New Romanticism.

In the 1930s and 40s, Morse was an assistant editor of The Nation, and news editor of The American Banker.

He received a PhD from Pennsylvania State College (now Penn State University) in 1952 (Note: Morse’s obituary claims he got his PhD in 1951, but his dissertation says 1952.) with a dissertation entitled Some Philosophical Influences on Literature in England, 597–1450. He taught at Pennsylvania State College until 1966. From 1966 to his retirement in 1976, he was a professor at Temple University in Philadelphia.

In 1974 he served as fiction editor at Southern Voices, a magazine of regional poetry, fiction, commentary, and reporting.

He died peacefully in his home in Haverford, PA, on Christmas Day, 2004.

== Work ==
=== James Joyce ===
Morse wrote The Sympathetic Alien: James Joyce and Catholicism, a collection of eight essays on the complicated relationship of Joyce to Catholic theology.

Morse contributed the chapter on Proteus to James Joyce’s Ulysses: Critical Essays.

Morse contributed the first chapter to A Conceptual Guide to Finnegans Wake. He corresponded with Adaline Glasheen, who credited him with several discoveries in her Third Census of Finnegans Wake.

=== Matters of Style ===
Morse wrote Matters of Style, a composition textbook on literary style. The book presents examples of writing from classical antiquity to the 20th century. The student is intended to learn from these styles by imitation. Morse writes of the book's method:

The method is to have students analyze a variety of literary styles and then write in those styles—not in order to wind up writing like Lyly or Dr. Johnson or Herman Melville or William Faulkner, but in order to discover some of the possibilities of English prose: to develop a consciousness of form and some skill in devising form, two things without which no individual style is possible.

— Matters of Style, vii

=== Language, thought, and politics ===
Morse was a staunch grammarian who believed that one who cannot write clearly cannot think clearly.

The syntax of our thought necessarily depends on that of our language; and so do its manners, its bearing, step and demeanor.

— “The Case for Irrelevance”, National Council of Teachers of English (1968)

Morse believed that it was in the political interest of his students for him not to teach books merely for their political relevance, but to cultivate their literary sensitivity with by having them read and write well. In The Irrelevant English Teacher Morse wrote that good writing is “inherently subversive.” He argued that authoritarians censor literature and attack liberal education because they fear the intellectual freedom that comes with literary sophistication.

=== Black English in schools ===
Morse opposed the Students’ Right to Their Own Language movement, arguing that Standard English ought to be required as the standard language of instruction for black students as well as for white students. Morse objected to what he considered ”a current form of the romanticism that recurrently softens the human brain: a demand that Black English (‘I goes, you goes, he go’) be recognized as an effective medium for intellectual work.” He believed that the proponents of African-American Vernacular English in university courses unwittingly serve the purposes of racism, and that Black English is “not a satisfactory medium for the communication of precise information or the development of clear ideas.” He concluded:

Black English is a demoralized language, an idiom of fettered minds, the shuffling speech of slavery. It served its bad purposes well. It cannot serve the purposes of free men and women. Those who would perpetuate it are romanticists clinging to corruption.

— The Irrelevant English Teacher (1972), p. 89.

=== Prejudice and Literature ===
Morse wrote Prejudice and Literature, a collection of essays on “the abuse of language and the resulting threat to human freedom.” He discusses “phantoms” created by taking metaphors and abstractions literally, such as the Body Politic, the Heir to Culture, the Natural Man, the Unstable Woman, and the Evil Intellectual. He argues in the first chapter that a “cultural ‘heritage’—a specific body of arts, sciences, letters, customs, manners, and amenities that some people by virtue of their race or nation ‘inherit’ and others don't—is a metaphor that ruins millions of people's lives, but [...] is accepted by some of those whose lives it ruins.” The book discusses the effect of these “phantoms” on Larbaud, Joyce, Lamb, Dickens, Eliot, Pound, and Shakespeare.

== Bibliography ==
- The Sympathetic Alien: James Joyce and Catholicism 1959, New York University Press
- Matters of Style 1968, Bobbs-Merrill Company, Inc.
- The Irrelevant English Teacher 1972, Temple University Press, ISBN 0-87722-016-6.
- Prejudice and Literature 1976, Temple University Press, ISBN 0-87722-072-7
