= Raf Mauro =

American film, television, theatre actor and playwright

- Occupation(s): Film, television actor, theatre actor and playwright
- Years active: 1972–present

Raf Mauro is an American film, television and stage actor, and playwright. He is known for playing Freddy in the 1982 film They Call Me Bruce?.

Mauro began his career in 1972, starring in the film Keep It Up, where he played the role of Paul. He has guest-starred in television programs including Seinfeld, Jake and the Fatman, Cheers, The Golden Girls, Caroline in the City, Knots Landing, Saved by the Bell, Charles in Charge, Family Matters and Full House.

Between 1994 and 1997 Mauro wrote three books, titled When Kids Achieve: Positive Monologues for Preteen Boys and Girls, Fitting In: Monologues for Boys and Girls and Modern Monologues for Modern Kids.

Mauro has written a play with David Stansfield about the aviator Bessie Coleman, titled A Good Day to Fly. He also has performed in theatre on a comedy improvisational, titled The Magic Mirror Players Children's Show.

== Filmography ==
=== Film ===
Year	Title	Role	Notes
1972	Keep It Up	Paul	
1974	Those Mad, Mad Moviemakers	Gaffer	
1978	Jokes My Folks Never Told Me		
1980	It's My Turn	Jerry Lanz Man	
1982	They Call Me Bruce?	Freddy	
1984	The Cartier Affair	Pilot	TV movie
1985	Copacabana	1st Publisher	TV movie
1987	Assault and Matrimony	Nokes	TV movie
1988	Who's in Charge Here	Salesman	TV movie
1988	Beach Balls	Sam Sugerman	
1991	Life Stinks	Hors d'Oeuvres Vagrant at Party	
1998	Winchell	Backstage Manager	
2001	The Hollywood Sign	Lenny Lena	
2011	Bucky Larson: Born to Be a Star	Chop Restaurant Owner	
2015	Sky	Motel Clerk	

=== Television ===
Year	Title	Role	Notes
1977	Serpico	Drunk	2 episodes
1977	Man from Atlantis	Maitre D'	1 episode
1981	The Greatest American Hero	The Man	1 episode
1982	No Soap, Radio	Man #1	1 episode
1982	T.J. Hooker	Terry Megan	1 episode
1982-1985	Hill Street Blues	Man with Crabs/ Walters	2 episodes
1982	Tucker's Witch		1 episode
1984-1985	Gimme a Break!		4 episodes
1985	Cheers	Reporter	1 episode
1985	Murder, She Wrote	Napoleon	1 episode
1985	Cagney & Lacey	Landlord	1 episode
1986	Perfect Strangers	Burglar	1 episode
1987-1989	Charles in Charge	Claude Craven/Professor Flack	2 episode
1987	Simon & Simon	Artie Wax	1 episode
1989	The Golden Girls	Bartender	1 episode
1989	Sister Kate	Repairman	1 episode
1989-1991	Night Court	Bum/Bum #1/Bum with Pet Rat	6 episodes
1989	Full House	Mechanic	1 episode
1990	Anything but Love		1 episode
1990	Saved by the Bell	Mr. Dickerson	1 episode
1991-1992	Jake and the Fatman	Mechanic/Owner	2 episodes
1991	Knots Landing	Big Al	1 episode
1991	Harry and the Hendersons	Fred	1 episode
1992	Stand by Your Man	Elroy	1 episode
1993	Melrose Place	Carny	1 episode
1993	Seinfeld	Car Washer	1 episode
1995	The Wayans Bros	Bill	1 episode
1995	Caroline in the City	Mugger	1 episode
1996	Can't Hurry Love	Eddie	1 episode
1996	Sisters	Maitre D'	1 episode
1997	Life with Roger	Bud	1 episode
1998	Family Matters	Referee	1 episode
1998	Buddy Faro		1 episode
1998	Hang Time	Sonny Bosco	1 episode
2006	Desperate Housewives	Gus	1 episode
2007	Pushing Daisies	Old Dead Guy	1 episode
2007	House	Doctor	1 episode
2012	The Mentalist	Niko	1 episode
