= Richard Mitchell =

Richard Mitchell (April 26, 1929 – December 27, 2002) was a professor, first of English and later of classics, at Glassboro State College in Glassboro, New Jersey. He gained fame in the late-1970s as the founder and publisher of The Underground Grammarian, a newsletter of opinion and criticism that ran until 1992, and wrote four books expounding his views on the relationships among language, education, and ethics.

== Life ==
Richard Mitchell was born in Brooklyn and spent his early life in Scarsdale, New York. He attended the University of Chicago briefly, where he met his wife, Francis, and spent the balance of his undergraduate years at the University of the South, where he graduated Phi Beta Kappa. He earned his Ph.D. at Syracuse University; sources conflict as to whether the subject of his doctorate was classical and Western literature, or American literature.

After teaching college English in Defiance, Ohio, Mitchell became a professor at Glassboro State College (now Rowan University) in 1963. Again, sources conflict as to Mitchell's subject at Glassboro; though he is more often listed as a professor of English, a few sources refer to him as a professor of classics. Those listing English, which include the dust jackets of his first three books, all occur before 1985, while those listing classics, including the dust jacket of his final book, all occur in or after 1985, suggesting that his position changed during late 1984 or early 1985; however, no source provides clear details.

In addition to being a well-regarded lecturer and teacher, Mitchell was a well-known author. He first gained prominence as the writer, publisher, and printer of The Underground Grammarian, a newsletter that offered satiric and often derisive essays on the misuse of the English language, particularly the misuse of written English on college campuses. He privately published the journal from 1977 to 1992. Although its circulation was limited, The Underground Grammarian was highly regarded, and, in addition to its academic audience, had a following outside academia that included George Will, Edwin Newman, and Johnny Carson, on whose The Tonight Show Mitchell appeared many times.

Mitchell went on to publish four books: Less Than Words Can Say (1979), The Graves of Academe (1981), The Leaning Tower of Babel (1984), and The Gift of Fire (1987). Virtually all of his writings, including these books and The Underground Grammarian, are available online for free. Mitchell gave his permission that all of these works be made available on the Internet and be disseminated freely, without charge, especially to teachers for use in their classrooms.

Mitchell's final book, The Psyche Papers, was left uncompleted. Mitchell published the four chapters he had completed in the final four issues of The Underground Grammarian (see below). Mitchell said in 2001 that he had "lost his faith."

John Simon said of Mitchell, "There exists in every age, in every society, a small, still choir of reason emanating from a few scattered thinkers ignored by the mainstream. Their collective voices, when duly discovered a century or so too late, reveal what was wrong with that society and age, and how it could have been corrected if only people had listened and acted accordingly. Richard Mitchell's is such a voice."

Mitchell retired in 1991, but continued to teach part-time until the fall of 2002. He died in his home of diabetes complications on December 27, 2002, at the age of 73, and was survived by his wife, Francis, daughters Amanda Merritt, Felicity Myers, Sonia Armstrong and Daphne Keller, as well as five grandchildren.

== The Underground Grammarian ==
In December 1976, the students, faculty, and administrators of Glassboro State College in New Jersey were greeted by a small, 4-page missive printed from hand-set type distributed on campus that proclaimed the following editorial policy:

The Underground Grammarian is an unauthorised journal devoted to the protection of the Mother Tongue at Glassboro State College. Our language can be written and even spoken correctly, even beautifully. We do not demand beauty, but bad English cannot be excused or tolerated in a college. The Underground Grammarian will expose and ridicule examples of jargon, faulty syntax, redundancy, needless neologism, and any other kind of outrage against English.

Clear language engenders clear thought, and clear thought is the most important benefit of education. We are neither peddlers nor politicians that we should prosper by that use of language which carries the least meaning. We cannot honorably accept the wages, confidence, or licensure of the citizens who employ us as we darken counsel by words without understanding. And so, to the whole college community, to students, to teachers, and to administrators of every degree, The Underground Grammarian gives WARNING! RAPE OF THE MOTHER TONGUE WILL BE PUNISHED!

And so began the polemicist career of Richard Mitchell, launched with the January 1977 issue of The Underground Grammarian, wherein he exposed and ridiculed academics, educationists, school principals, and teachers who engaged in spreading mindlessness in the name of enlightenment.

His maiden publication also asserted, under the heading "What Can We Do?", the following:

The Underground Grammarian does not advocate violence; it advocates ridicule. Abusers of English are often pompous, and ridicule hurts them more than violence. In every edition we will bring you practical advice for ridiculing abusers of English.

Regarding subscriptions, the editor stated rather tersely:

There are no subscriptions. We don't lack money, and we may attack you in the next issue. No one is safe.

We will print no letters to the editor. We will give no space to opposing points of view. They are wrong. The Underground Grammarian is at war and will give the enemy nothing but battle.

By January 1979, The Underground Grammarian had garnered national attention and a circulation of 1800, with Mitchell receiving 12 to 15 letters per day from readers offering examples of bad writing, speaking, and teaching. Mitchell published The Underground Grammarian for 15 years.

Mitchell eventually charged a modest annual subscription fee starting in September 1979: "U.S & Canada, $10; others, $14." In February 1984 Mitchell raised subscription fees: "Persons in USA & Canada, $15US; Persons elsewhere, $20; Institutions, $25." Institutional requests (i.e., libraries) seemed to have bothered Mitchell since before long he had replaced "Institution, $25" with "non-personal entities of any description, $25 or even more." By the April 1990 issue, the subscription information included the subtle declaration, "No more libraries allowed!" After several years, Mitchell gave half-price discounts to retired teachers, stating that their "presence among our readers indicates that they must have been good teachers, and the same discount, or even more, applies to readers who happen to need it."

By then the request for back issues forced Mitchell to write, "We remind readers one and all that we approve when our readers make photocopies, however numerous. It just shows good judgment." Mitchell always encouraged free distribution of his writings. In 1983 Mitchell pulled back from nine issues per year to eight. The amount of text had doubled by then. In 1990 he reduced the number of printed issues to five, and in 1991, the final year, he published only four, but these two years saw double-sized issues (16 half-pages).

Mitchell started out using an ancient Gordon-Franklin press and within two years switched to a Chandler & Price press. By 1981, he had moved on to an elderly (circa 1935) cylinder letterpress, a Webendorfer "Little Giant." In the March 1985 issue, Mitchell informed his readers that he had given up printing from hand-set type for a machine that could self-justify text on a line: the new Macintosh computer. Of hand-set type, Mitchell explained:

This method of composition is interesting and full of suspense, to be sure, but it has certain disadvantages of which most writers have never even dreamed....sometimes, when thirty or forty lines have been set, it becomes obvious that the piece is just no good. That sort of catastrophe might mean a delay of a week or more in what we don't even bother to call a "production schedule." Even one such false start, added to the fact that all the type used to print the last edition has to be redistributed for the next edition, can set us back for a month or more....We are a bit sentimental and sorry. We'll miss the taste of lead. But the choice, although painful, was not difficult. Our proper business is to get this thing out, and not to preserve a fine and ancient craft.

The first seven issues of The Underground Grammarian were published anonymously, simply referring to the author/editor as "The Grammarian." The eighth issue announced that "R. Mitchell of our staff has been promoted to the post of Assistant Circulation Manager." In the December 1986 issue, R. Mitchell was quietly promoted to Associate Circulation Manager, and then in the Spring 1991 issue, he was promoted to Full Circulation Manager, "with tenure," the title he carried to the end.

Mention was also made of "Central Control," the real power behind the scenes. Central Control was Mitchell's title for his wife and apparently held the mailing list. Mitchell wrote in the March 1988 issue: "Every morning, the Associate Circulation Manager drives Central Control down to the post office. She sits there dearly hoping that you have not moved. She does not entirely approve of moving. And she has dark visions when your Grammarian comes back marked, Address Unknown, Not Even a Trace of You. She hopes that if you must move, a), that someone else is paying, and b), that you will send her your new address."

Mitchell did not announce to his readers that he was retiring The Underground Grammarian. The final newsletter was mailed early in 1992, still with subscription information, ten years before his death. Articles in the final issue included: "Running on Empty," "Words, Words, Words," and "Psyche in Darkness."

Mark Alexander published the magazine in full and it is now archived at https://sourcetext.com/grammarian/

== Books ==
=== Less Than Words Can Say ===
In the summer of 1979, Little, Brown & Company published Richard Mitchell's first book, Less Than Words Can Say. Mitchell had originally submitted the title as The Worm in the Brain but his editors felt it too frightening and grisly. The book is a gloomy contemplation of the new illiteracy, its roots and consequences, and its prosperous practitioners.

Clifton Fadiman called it "the wittiest, the most brilliant and probably the most penetrating discussion now available of our growing American illiteracy." Josiah Mitchell Morse praised Mitchell for having "the courage to write well — an even rarer courage now that sloppy thought is equated with democratic virtue. His own prose illustrates the qualities and habits of mind our educationists don't want our children to develop: wit, clarity, precision, mastery of detail, intellectual self-respect, and contempt for charlatans."

=== The Graves of Academe ===
Mitchell's second book started out as a collection of articles from The Underground Grammarian before transforming into a description "by extrapolation from one visible protuberance to another, and with a little probing, the great invisible hulk of the beast, the brooding monstrosity of American educationism, the immense, mindless brute that by now troubles the waters of all, all that is done in our land in the supposed cause of 'education.'"

A TIME magazine review of the book said that Mitchell "makes H.L. Mencken sound like a waffler."

=== The Leaning Tower of Babel ===
In his third book, which turned out to be what was originally meant to be his second book, Mitchell published a collection of articles from The Underground Grammarian under ten topics and with an introduction by Thomas H. Middleton. In that introduction, Middleton wrote:

I first met Richard Mitchell when he came from the East Coast out here to Los Angeles to appear on the Johnny Carson show. We had had a bit of correspondence, and I'd told him I'd like to meet him if he ever traveled to the West. I planted myself at the bar of his hotel, the Sheraton Universal, and he came in almost immediately. We had a couple of drinks and a very congenial chat, in the course of which I complimented him on his UNDERGROUND GRAMMARIAN essays. I said that each of them was a masterpiece. He instantly denied authorship of them. "It's a muse," he said. "Something out there comes down and guides my hand."

I laughed, but he insisted that it was so. He said that surely I must have written columns that seemed to write themselves. I owned that on rare occasions I had — usually when I was mad as hell about something — and I admitted that I had frequently written letters to the editor and letters of complaint to offending merchants and manufacturers, and that those letters flowed effortlessly from a hand that almost seemed not my own.

"Exactly," he said.

So there you are. THE UNDERGROUND GRAMMARIAN will have great appeal for anyone who simply loves good writing, for the writing in these articles is superb. Moreover, these pieces, articulate, intelligent, often wildly funny, and frequently dazzling, spring from a splendid mind, tuned to just the right pitch, and fired with an angry passion under the supernatural control of Mitchell's muse.

Before the publication of this book, Mitchell invited his readers to submit entries to the Amazing Blurb Contest. Three readers won, having their blurbs printed on the dustjacket of the book.

=== The Gift of Fire ===
"I suspect that those who have read some of my other works will be a little surprised by this one. I am a little surprised by this one." Thus began the introduction to Mitchell's final book, wherein he describes the turn he has taken from the "castigation of fools... an ancient and honorable task of writers" to writing a book "about how to live by a man who doesn't know how to live, but who has begun to learn that he doesn't know how."

== Works ==
- The Underground Grammarian, a newsletter published nine times yearly from 1977 to 1983, eight times yearly from 1984 to 1989, five times in 1990, and four times in 1991.

=== Books ===
- Less Than Words Can Say, 1979.
- The Graves of Academe, 1981.
- The Leaning Tower of Babel, 1984.
- The Gift of Fire, 1987.

=== Four "Great Booklets", compilations of "Vexatious Readings" from various authors, attributed to "The Underground Tractarian Society" ===
- The First Great Booklet: A Leaflet for the Masses
- The Second Great Booklet
- The Third Great Booklet
- The Fourth Great Booklet

=== Miscellaneous ===
- "Why Good Grammar?"
- "Writing Against Your Life", a speech presented at a writers' conference at Loyola Marymount University in 1986; later adapted into the fifth chapter of The Gift of Fire.
- "What to Do till the Undertaker Comes", a supplement to The Underground Grammarian, year unknown.
