= Brenda Boozer =

American mezzo-soprano

Brenda Boozer (born January 25, 1948) is an American mezzo-soprano who has had an active international career performing in operas and concerts since the mid 1970s. She was a member of the Metropolitan Opera in New York City for 11 seasons.

== Biography ==
Born in Atlanta, Georgia, Boozer participated in beauty pageants in her youth and was crowned Miss Tallahassee in 1967. She received her bachelor's degree from Florida State University and completed graduate studies in vocal performance at the Juilliard School. At Juilliard she notably performed the role of Venus in a production of Jean-Philippe Rameau's rarely performed Dardanus with tenor John Aler in the title role in 1975. She also studied dance with Martha Graham and acting with Herbert Berghof in New York City. In 1976 she was a finalist in the Metropolitan Opera National Auditions. She attended the Music Academy of the West in 1976 and 1977.

Boozer made her professional opera debut in 1974 at the Santa Fe Opera as Winter in Francesco Cavalli's Egisto with George Shirley in the title role. In 1977 she made her debut at the San Francisco Opera as Sextus in Mozart's La Clemenza di Tito with Sandor Salgo conducting and her debut with Michigan Opera Theatre in the title role of Bizet's Carmen. In 1978, she made her debut at the Lyric Opera of Chicago as Lola in Pietro Mascagni's Cavalleria rusticana under the baton of Riccardo Chailly. She made her debut with the Houston Grand Opera in 1979, singing the title role in Rossini's La Cenerentola with conductor Raymond Leppard.

Boozer made her Metropolitan Opera debut on Christmas Day 1979, as Hansel to Gail Robinson's Gretel in Engelbert Humperdinck's Hansel and Gretel. She continued to perform at the Metropolitan for the next 11 years, portraying such roles as the Composer in Strauss' Ariadne auf Naxos, Cornelia in Handel's Giulio Cesare, both the Muse and Nicklausse in Offenbach's The Tales of Hoffmann, Meg Page in Verdi's Falstaff, Octavian in Der Rosenkavalier, Olga in Tchaikovsky's Eugene Onegin, the Page in Salome, Suzuki in Puccini's Madama Butterfly, and Wellgunde in Wagner's Das Rheingold. Her last performance at the Met was as Prince Orlofsky in Die Fledermaus on January 13, 1990.

Boozer has also performed with other opera companies including the Arizona Opera, the Frankfurt Opera, Glyndebourne Festival Opera, Los Angeles Opera, The Netherlands Opera, Opera Memphis, Opéra National de Lyon, Paris Opéra, Pittsburgh Opera, Portland Opera, the Royal Opera, London, San Diego Opera, Teatro Comunale Florence, and the Teatro de Santiago among others. She has also performed in operas at the Caramoor International Music Festival, the Festival dei Due Mondi, and the Spoleto Festival USA. She has appeared on The Merv Griffin Show, The Mike Douglas Show, The Tonight Show Starring Johnny Carson and Late Night with David Letterman.

Boozer was married to comedian/actor Robert Klein from 1973 to 1989; they had one son, Alexander Klein. She is currently married to pianist Dr. Ford Lallerstedt and lives in Boone, North Carolina, in the Blue Ridge Mountains. She practices Transcendental Meditation.
