= Francine Néago =

French campaigner for orangutan conservation

- Born: 1930 (age 95–96); Paris, France
- Citizenship: French
- Known for: Orangutan conservation

Francine Néago (born 1930) is a French campaigner for orangutan conservation, and the founder of a wildlife sanctuary in Indonesia. Ester Kerr wrote a children's book based on Néago's manuscripts on her adventurous life with animals.

In 2016, a public debate took place in France about the validity of Néago's claims, such as teaching an orangutan sign language and spelling, and being the author of 12 books.

== Early life ==
Néago was born in Paris. She married an Indonesian man, Biroum Noerjasin, and returned with him to Surabaya.

== Career ==
In 2006 she co-authored a 48-page children's book describing how an orphaned orangutan she raised in her home behaved like a human child. In 2007 she set up the Bali Endangered Animal Rescue (BEAR) center in the Indonesian island of Bali. She founded the wildlife sanctuary Noah and his Ark, now located 3 kilometres from Bukit Lawang, in the north of Sumatra. In 2011 she travelled to Malaysia, intending to set up an orangutan language centre in Sarawak. In 2015, she proposed that Indonesia should establish additional orangutan rehabilitation centres, since all the existing ones were full, and some orangutans made homeless by deforestation in Sumatra had to be kept in small cages. She planned to rehabilitate about 50 animals for release in the Mount Leuser National Park and the Tigapulu mountainous area in Sumatra, calling for support.

== Works ==
- Néago, Francine; Kerr, Esther (2006). A young Orangutan in a Loving Home. Uturat. ISBN 978-0-977-68190-7. (Note: This is the only book published by Uturat; the company was registered to David Larson and Néago's coauthor, Esther Kerr. The book contains 48 pages, including 9 black and white illustrations.)

== Reception ==
Cartoon by Loic Faujour, used by the science journalist Antonio Fischetti in his account of Néago's claims to have been a scientist, which he states she never was. It depicts Néago saying "I've screwed all of you!" to three reporters, under the caption "The 'Primatologist' Francine Néago is descended from a Bonobo".

In 2004, the traveller James Rickert described Néago as "one of the more interesting, inspirational, and courageous people I have ever met." In 2011, The Star of Malaysia called Néago a "renowned ethnologist and primatologist". The leading French daily newspaper Le Monde described Néago in January 2016 as "one of the greatest world specialists in apes and their language." In February 2016, the photographer Bruno Levy published a "reportage" of 15 portraits of Néago. In March 2016 (before the Causette article was published), Kaizen magazine commented that her age "had altered neither her convictions nor her battles."

On 25 March 2016, Sarah Gandillot, writing in the French magazine Causette, claimed that most of the information about Néago's career and life was unverifiable or false. A controversy then broke out in France about Néago's claims. Néago had claimed in her curriculum vitae page on the "Noah and His Ark" website that she was a "Medical doctor from University College London England", having studied there between 1959 and 1965; that she had conducted "Research at UCLA", taking a "Twelve years study program teaching a one year old Orang utan to learn phonetic spelling, to talk and spell on a computer" between 1980 and 1992; and that she had "Helped to design and build Singapore Zoo", between 1979 and 1980. Among other things, Causette claimed that Stuart Wolpert, a spokesman for UCLA, stated that "we [UCLA] could find no trace of her [Francine Néago] passage to UCLA as a teacher ... The Department of Anthropology, which could have been best able to accommodate a primatologist has no record of her".

A debate began on the Aider Francine (Help Francine [Néago]) Facebook page. The SOS-MAWAS organisation described itself as "astonished" that Sarah Gandillot, who had been in contact with that organisation on 11 and 12 March 2016, had not contacted it prior to publishing her claims on Causette. The French daily newspaper Le Figaro, citing Causette and the Facebook debate, announced on 29 March 2016 that it was suspending its appeal on Néago's behalf while the facts were ascertained. In 2016, the physicist and science journalist Antonio Fischetti used her interview with Gandillot as an instance of how sincere people could "fall into the trap" of fraudulent science. He illustrated the account with a cartoon by Loic Faujour depicting Néago saying "I've screwed all of you!" to three reporters, under the caption "The 'Primatologist' Francine Néago is descended from a Bonobo". He concluded that "Francine Néago has not undertaken the least scientific work".
