= Bob Glover =

American author and running coach

Bob Glover is an American author of instructional running books and a running coach in the New York City area.

Glover is author of the book The Runner's Handbook: The Bestselling Classic Fitness Guide for Beginning and Intermediate Runners, which is a best-seller trade paperback. Another Glover book, The Competitive Runner's Handbook, has sold nearly 200,000 copies.

Glover is also noted for his coaching. In 1978, he directed his first New York Road Runners class. More than 3,000 runners of varying skill levels participate yearly in these classes. In addition, he conducts the City Sports for Kids track program for the New York Road Runners.
