= Grammarian =

Topics referred to by the same term

Grammarian may refer to:

- Alexandrine grammarians, philologists and textual scholars in Hellenistic Alexandria in the 3rd and 2nd centuries BCE
- Biblical grammarians, scholars who study the Bible and the Hebrew language
- Grammarian (Greco-Roman), a teacher in the second stage in the traditional education system
- Linguist, a scientist who studies language
  - Grammarian, a linguistic specialist in grammar, the structural rules that govern natural languages
- Philologist, a scholar of literary criticism, history, and language
- Sanskrit grammarian, scholars who studied the grammar of Sanskrit
- Speculative grammarians or Modistae, a 13th and 14th century school of philosophy
- Grammarians of Basra, scholars of Arabic
- Grammarians of Kufa, scholars of Arabic

== See also ==
- Grammaticus, a name used by several scholars
- Neogrammarian, a German school of philology in the late 19th century
