= Robert Klein =

American stand-up comedian (b. 1942)

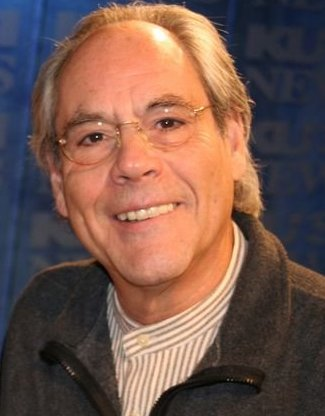
- Klein in 2010
- Born: February 8, 1942 (age 84); The Bronx, New York, U.S.
- Education: Alfred University (BA); Yale University (MFA)
- Occupations: Stand-up comedian, singer, actor
- Spouse: Brenda Boozer (m. 1973; div. 1989)
- Children: 1

Comedy career
- Years active: 1965–present
- Medium: Stand-up, television, film, theatre
- Genres: Observational comedy, improvisational comedy, satire/Political satire, musical comedy
- Subjects: Everyday life, American politics

Robert Klein (born February 8, 1942) is an American stand-up comedian, singer, and actor. He is known for his appearances on stage and screen. He has released four standup comedy albums: A Child of the 50s (1973), Mind Over Matter (1974), New Teeth (1975), and Let's Not Make Love (1990). The first two albums received Grammy Award for Best Comedy Album nominations. Klein hosted Saturday Night Live in its first season in 1975 and again in 1978. Klein made his Broadway debut in the 1966 production of The Apple Tree opposite Alan Alda. He earned a Tony Award for Best Actor in a Musical nomination for his performance in Neil Simon's musical comedy They're Playing Our Song (1979). He also starred on his own show, Robert Klein Time, which aired on USA Network from 1986 to 1988.

He is known for his film roles in The Owl and the Pussycat (1970), Mixed Nuts (1994), One Fine Day (1996), Primary Colors (1998), The Safety of Objects (2001), Two Weeks Notice (2002), How to Lose a Guy in 10 Days (2003), and Reign Over Me (2007). He is also known for his recurring television roles in Law & Order: Special Victims Unit (2009–2012), The Good Wife (2013–2014), Madam Secretary (2014) and Will & Grace (2018–2019). He has received two Primetime Emmy Award nominations for his specials, Child in his 50's (2001), and Unfair and Unbalanced (2010). He was profiled in the Starz documentary Robert Klein Still Can't Stop His Leg (2016).

== Early life ==
Klein was born in the Bronx, the son of Frieda (née Moskowitz) and Benjamin Klein, and was raised in a "prototypical 1950s Bronx Jewish" environment, the grandson of Hungarian-Jewish immigrants who arrived in the USA early in the 20th century. He has an older sister, Rhoda.

After graduating from DeWitt Clinton High School, Klein had planned to study medicine; however, he changed his mind during his studies at Alfred University, deciding to go into acting instead.

While studying at the Yale Drama School, Klein learned about an opportunity to audition for The Second City. In a piece he wrote for the improvisational troupe's book, Klein recalled sitting in a room full of other hopefuls, including Fred Willard. Klein's audition consisted of an improvisation set with Willard about two guys in a nightclub, which was successful enough to get Klein and Willard hired by Second City. In the spring of 1965 Klein was chosen as a member of Second City. When he returned to New York City a year later, he was cast by Mike Nichols in the Broadway musical The Apple Tree.

== Career ==
=== Early work ===
Klein's first major appearance was as host of the 1970 summer replacement television series Comedy Tonight, on which were introduced many of the routines that in the next few years would be released on record albums. His extensive routines about the Watergate scandal made him highly popular in the 1970s. In 1974, he appeared in an episode of Paul Sand in Friends and Lovers.

Klein starred in HBO's first stand-up comedy special in 1975 during the cable channel's early broadcast days and has continued to appear in several more one-man shows which have typically concluded with his "I can't stop my leg" routine. On November 15, 1975, during season one, and again in season three, on January 28, 1978, Klein hosted Saturday Night Live. His skits included "Tough Director" in 1975, "Nick The Lounge Singer Sings Star Wars Theme" in 1978 and "The Olympia Restaurant: Cheeseburger, Chips and Pepsi" in 1978.

In 1979 Klein starred in Neil Simon's musical comedy They're Playing Our Song opposite Lucie Arnaz. He was nominated for a Tony Award for Best Actor in a Musical.

In 1985 he starred in the "Wordplay" segment of The Twilight Zone, which cast him against type in a dramatic role. In 1986 Klein had his own late-night talk show, Robert Klein Time, which ran on the USA Network until 1988. The following year, Klein hosted Monty Python Live at Aspen, a reunion and tribute show for the five surviving members of the British comedy troupe, in a special that appeared on HBO in 1998.

=== Comedy albums ===
Klein has released four comedy albums, A Child of the Fifties (1973), Mind Over Matter (1974), New Teeth (1975), and Let's Not Make Love (1990). The first two albums received Grammy Award for Best Comedy Album nominations.

In A Child of the Fifties (1973, Brut/Buddah Records), shown as Child of the 50s (on the cover), Klein talks about his life as a child in the 1950s: about air raid drills, Johnny Mathis music, showing off condoms while at the high school dance, the high school lunch ladies, Senator Joseph McCarthy, Governor W. Averell Harriman (of New York), meeting Yankee stars, the Yankees losing the World Series, and much more. He also goes into other things that he has observed in his life, such as substitute teaching, 1970s FM radio disc jockeys, late-night delicatessens, and annoying commercials (e.g., Geritol). He also performed two songs that he wrote himself: "Fabulous '50s" and "Middle Class, Educated Blues."

His next album, Mind Over Matter (1974), included extensive discussion of the Watergate scandal and another song—the title track—about a kid who turned to humor to become popular.

"The funniest album by a standup comic since George Carlin's Class Clown leaves behind the grammar-school nostalgia—which although frequently amusing always seemed formulaic when it wasn't—that kept Klein from sounding commercially uncompromised. Unlike Carlin, Klein gets better all the time. Never trivial, never cynical, never lacking a comic purpose for his outrage, he's up there with Pryor and Tomlin."

— Review of New Teeth in Christgau's Record Guide: Rock Albums of the Seventies (1981)

Klein's follow-up album, New Teeth (1975, Epic/CBS Records), featured the comedian's on-stage work on tracks such as "Mother Isn't Always Right" and his transposition of George Carlin's "Seven Words You Can't Say On Television," titled "Six Clean Words You Can Say Anywhere," with studio-recorded material such as "Continental Steel" and "On the Bayou."

Klein responded to the end of the sexual revolution with his 1990 album, Let's Not Make Love, which contained many of the same routines as his 1984 HBO special Child of the '50s, Man of the '80s and his 1986 special Robert Klein on Broadway.

=== Film and television ===
Klein has appeared in such films as The Owl and the Pussycat (1970), Hooper (1978), The Last Unicorn (1982), Radioland Murders (1994), One Fine Day (1996), Primary Colors (1998), The Safety of Objects (2001), Two Weeks Notice (2002), How to Lose a Guy in 10 Days (2003), and Ira and Abby (2006). Klein had a recurring role in the TV drama series Sisters. In the 1970s, he hosted Saturday Night Live twice. He also appeared as a guest star in the animated series Duckman, in the NBC sitcom Family Ties, and on the CBS sitcom The King of Queens.

In 2005 he launched The Amorous Busboy of Decatur Avenue, his 8th HBO Special.

In March 2007 Klein once again collaborated with Adam Sandler (after appearing in Mixed Nuts) in Reign Over Me, and in September 2007 released a new DVD compilation of his eight live HBO specials, entitled Robert Klein: The HBO Specials 1975–2005. Klein starred in The Mysteries of Laura, a crime dramedy on NBC starring Debra Messing. In this series he played the father of the show's main character, Laura. He appeared alongside Messing again in the relaunched version of her sitcom Will & Grace, playing the father of her character, Grace Adler. In 2014, Klein played the Canadian Ambassador on Madam Secretary. Klein played the Mayor of New York City in Sharknado 2: The Second One (2014) and Sharknado 3: Oh Hell No! (2015).

In 2018 Klein played Grace Adler's father Martin in the NBC revival of Will and Grace replacing Alan Arkin. Klein has authored an autobiography, The Amorous Busboy of Decatur Avenue: A Child of the Fifties Looks Back (2006).

== Personal life ==
Klein is divorced from opera singer Brenda Boozer. They have a son, Alexander Stuart Klein, who goes by Allie Klein and performs standup comedy.

== Influence ==
Klein has named Lenny Bruce, Jonathan Winters, and Rodney Dangerfield as comedy influences.

Jerry Seinfeld has stated Klein's influences on him stating "He was The Beatles of comedy to me." Various comedians including Bill Maher, Billy Crystal, Richard Lewis, and Jay Leno, all have also cited Klein as a comedic influence.

== Filmography ==
=== Film ===
Year	Title	Role	Notes
1970	The Landlord	Peter	Credited as Bob Klein
1970	The Owl and the Pussycat	Barney	
1971	The Pursuit of Happiness	Melvin Lasher	
1972	Rivals	Peter / Husband	
1978	Hooper	Roger Deal	
1979	The Bell Jar	Lenny	
1981	Nobody's Perfekt	Walter	
1982	The Last Unicorn	Butterfly	Voice
1988	Dangerous Curves	Bam Bam	
1990	Tales from the Darkside: The Movie	Wyatt	Segment: "Lover's Vow"
1994	Radioland Murders	Father Writer	
1994	Mixed Nuts	Mr. Lobel	
1995	Jeffrey	Skip Winkley	
1996	One Fine Day	Dr. Martin	
1998	Next Stop Wonderland	Arty Lesser	
1998	Primary Colors	Norman Asher	
1999	Suits	Tom Cranston	
1999	The Contract	Jackson	
1999	Goosed	Dad / Mel	
2009	Labor Pains	David Raymond	
2001	Piñero	Doctor	
2001	The Safety of Objects	Howard Gold	
2002	I'm with Lucy	Dr. Mort Zalkind	
2002	People I Know	Dr. Sandy Napier	
2002	Two Weeks Notice	Larry Kelson	
2003	How to Lose a Guy in 10 Days	Phillip Warren	
2006	Ira & Abby	Seymour Black	
2007	Reign Over Me	Jonathan Timpleman	
2010	The Back-up Plan	Dr. Scott Harris	
2011	National Lampoon's Dirty Movie	The CEO	
2011	Demoted	Bob Farrell	
2012	Another Dirty Movie	The CEO	
2012	Putzel	Narrator	Voice
2021	Before I Go	Jasper	

=== Television ===
Year	Title	Role	Notes
1973	Love, American Style	Michael	Episode: "Love and the End of the Line"
1974	Paul Sand in Friends and Lovers	Mike Moran	Episode: "Moran's the Man"
1975-1978	Saturday Night Live	Host / Himself	2 episodes
1977	Visions	Rebbe	Episode: "A Secret Space"
1985	George Burns Comedy Week	Jay Miller	Episode: "Death Benefits"
1985	The Twilight Zone	Bill Lowery	Episode: "Wordplay"
1986	Comedy Factory	Robert Morgan	Episode: "Father's Day"
1988	Family Ties	Roger Erdman	Episode: "The Boys Next Door"
1989	Murder, She Wrote	Barney Drake	Episode: "Trevor Hudson's Legacy"
1989	Trying Times	Buddy Amber	Episode: "A Good Life"
1990	Midnight Caller	Ryder	Episode: "Ryder on the Storm"
1993	Law & Order	Rick Mason	Episode: "Sweeps"
1993	Frasier	Gary	Voice; Episode: "The Crucible"
1996	Grace Under Fire	Fred Mullens / Ron	2 episodes
1996	Sisters	Albert Barker	25 episodes
1997	Duckman	Uncle Mo Dorkin	2 episodes
1998	Monty Python Live at Aspen	Himself (host)	Television special
1998	Dr. Katz, Professional Therapist	Robert	Episode: "Old Man"
1999	Mad About You	Stan Freitus	Episode: "Farmer Buchman"
1999	Cosby	Jack	Episode: "A Very Nice Dance"
1999	The King of Queens	Bruce Degner	Episode: "Sparing Carrie"
2001	Oz	Robert Klein	Episode: "Conversions"
2001	Bob Patterson	Landau	6 episodes
2004	The Stones	Stan Stone	7 episodes
2008	Life on Mars	Elliott Casso	Episode: "Have You Seen Your Mother, Baby, Standing in the Shadows"
2008-2010	Heartland	Dwayne Trent	2 episodes
2009-2012	Law and Order: SVU	Dwight Stannich	4 epsides
2013	Royal Pains	Bert	Episode: "Hammertime"
2013-2014	The Good Wife	Lyle Pollard	2 episodes
2014	Madam Secretary	Amb. Lester Clark	Episode: "Blame Canada"
2014	Comedians in Cars Getting Coffee	Himself	Episode: "Opera Pimp"
2014	Whoopi Goldberg Presents Moms Mabley	Self	Documentary
2014-2016	The Mysteries of Laura	Leo Diamond	5 episodes
2014	Sharknado 2: The Second One	The Mayor	Television movie
2015	Sharknado 3: Oh Hell No!	Mayor of New York	Television movie
2015	The Seventies	Self	Episode: "Television Gets Real"
2016	Robert Klein Still Can't Stop His Leg	Self	Starz Documentary
2018-2019	Will & Grace	Martin Adler	4 episodes
2022	George Carlin's American Dream	Self	HBO Documentary

=== Theatre ===
Year	Title	Role	Venue	Ref.
1966	The Apple Tree	Ensemble / Guard	Shubert Theatre, Broadway	
1968	Leonard Sillman's New Faces of 1968	Performer	Booth Theatre, Broadway	
1979	They're Playing Our Song	Vernon Gersh	Imperial Theatre, Broadway	
1985	The Robert Klein Show	Self	Circle in the Square Theatre, Broadway	
1986	Robert Klein on Broadway	Self	Nederlander Theatre, Broadway	
1988	An Evening with Robert Klein	Self	Circle in the Square Theatre, Broadway	
1993	The Sisters Rosensweig	Mervyn Kant	Ethel Barrymore Theatre, Broadway	

=== Comedy specials ===
Year	Title	Studio	Formats	Ref.
1975	On Location: An Evening with Robert Klein	HBO	Broadcast	
1977	On Location: Robert Klein Revisited	HBO	Broadcast	
1977	Klein Time	CBS	Broadcast	
1981	The Robert Klein Show	NBC	Broadcast	
1982	On Location: Robert Klein at Yale	HBO	Broadcast	
1984	Child of the 50s, Man of the 80s	HBO	Broadcast/VHS	
1986	Robert Klein on Broadway	HBO	Broadcast/VHS	
1995	It All Started Here	HBO	Broadcast	
2000	Child in His 50s	HBO	Broadcast/DVD	
2005	The Amorous Busboy of Decatur Avenue	HBO	Broadcast/Streaming/DVD	
2007	The HBO Specials 1975-2005	Standing Room Only Entertainment	4xDVD box set	
2010	Unfair and Unbalanced	HBO	Broadcast/Streaming/DVD	
2016	Robert Klein Still Can't Stop His Leg (documentary)	Starz	Broadcast/Streaming	

== Discography ==
=== Albums ===
Year	Title	Label	Formats	Ref.
1972	The Unauthorized Autobiography Of Howard Who?	Caedmon Records	LP	
1973	Child of the 50s	Brut Records	LP/8-track/cassette	
1974	Mind Over Matter	Brut Records	LP/8-track/cassette	
1975	New Teeth	Epic Records	LP/cassette	
1979	Original Cast Recording - They're Playing Our Song	Casablanca Records	LP/cassette	
1990	Let's Not Make Love	Rhino Records	Cassette/CD	

== Awards and nominations ==
Year	Award	Category	Nominated work	Result	Ref.
1975	Grammy Award	Best Comedy Album	Child of the 50s	Nominated	
1976	Grammy Award	Best Comedy Album	Mind Over Matter	Nominated	
1979	Tony Award	Best Actor in a Musical	They're Playing Our Song	Nominated	
1998	Drama Desk Award	Outstanding Featured Actor in a Play	The Sisters Rosensweig	Nominated	
1998	Outer Critics Circle	Outstanding Actor in a Play	The Sisters Rosensweig	Won	
2011	Primetime Emmy Award	Outstanding Original Music and Lyrics	Child in his 50s	Nominated	
2011	Primetime Emmy Award	Outstanding Original Music and Lyrics	Unfair and Unbalanced	Nominated	
