= Merie Earle =

American actress (1889–1984)

- Merie Earle in The Waltons, 1974
- Born: Goldie Merie Ireland; May 13, 1889; Morrow, Ohio, U.S.
- Died: November 4, 1984 (aged 95); Glendale, California, U.S.
- Resting place: Green Lawn Cemetery
- Other name: Merie Earls
- Occupation: Actress
- Years active: 1967–1983
- Spouse: Lawrence Nathan Earls (m. 1909; died 1954)
- Children: 1

Merie Earle (born Goldie Merie Ireland; May 13, 1889 – November 4, 1984) was an American actress. She was best known for playing Maude Gormley on the television series The Waltons (1972–1979).

== Early years ==
After Earle's father retired, her parents relocated to La Crescenta, California, to be closer to their daughter. She was discovered by an agent while performing in a play at a Methodist church.

== Career ==
Beginning her professional career late in life, Earle's first jobs included ads for Polaroid.

In 1967 she made her feature film debut in Fitzwilly starring Dick Van Dyke. Her screen credits included Gaily, Gaily (1969); In Name Only; Dr. Max (1974); Crazy Mama (1975); Fatso (1980); and Going Ape (1981). She was a regular on the TV series The Jerry Reed When You're Hot You're Hot Hour in 1972 and The Waltons from 1972 to 1979 as Maude Gormley. Earle also appeared in the made-for-TV movie The Last of the Good Guys in 1978.

Scheduled to make her Broadway debut, at age 88, in a revival of Paul Zindel's Effects of Gamma Rays on Man-in-the-Moon Marigolds in 1978, Earle suffered a fractured hip during the show's initial run in La Jolla, California and withdrew from the production prior to its New York premiere. She guest starred on many notable television series including Petticoat Junction, Green Acres, The Beverly Hillbillies, Bewitched, Night Gallery, The Bob Newhart Show, All in the Family, Alice, Phyllis and Whiz Kids.

In her eighties, she was a frequent guest on The Tonight Show Starring Johnny Carson.

== Death ==
Earle died aged 95 on November 4, 1984, in Verdugo Hills Hospital in Glendale, California, of uremia poisoning following surgery for colon cancer, having outlived both her husband and her daughter.

She was interred at Green Lawn Cemetery in her home town of Columbus, Ohio.

== Filmography ==
=== Film ===
- Fitzwilly (1967) – Elderly Shoplifter (uncredited)
- Gaily, Gaily (1969) – Granny
- Norwood (1970) – Grandma Whichcoat
- Clay Pigeon (1971)
- Summer School Teachers (1975) – Ethel
- Crazy Mama (1975) – Bertha
- Almost Summer (1978)
- Fatso (1980) – Mrs. Maluch
- Going Ape! (1981) – Binocular Lady
- Likely Stories, Vol. 3 (1983) – Miss Greg (final film role)

=== Television ===
- Petticoat Junction (1967, Season 5, Episode 1: "Is This My Daughter") – Martha Hughes
- Green Acres (1966–1970) – Sarah Hotchkiss Trendell / Sarah Hotchkiss / Old Lady
- The Beverly Hillbillies (1968) – Rebecca's Mother
- In Name Only (1969, TV Movie) – Granny
- Bonanza (1969) – Saloon Woman (uncredited)
- Bewitched (1970) – Old Lady
- Love, American Style (1970) – Grace (segment "Love and Grandma") (uncredited)
- Night Gallery (1970) – Old Woman (segment "The Housekeeper") (uncredited)
- The Jerry Reed When You're Hot You're Hot Hour (1972)
- The Waltons (1972–1979) – Maude Gormley
- The Carol Burnett Show (1973) – Woman in grocery store in “Double Calamity” sketch
- Apple's Way (1974) – Meg
- The Bob Newhart Show (1974–1975) – Mrs. Loomis
- ABC After School Specials (1976) – Old Lady
- Phyllis (1977) – Wilma
- All In The Family (1977) – Florence Talley
- Mad Bull (1977, TV Movie) – (uncredited)
- C.P.O. Sharkey (1977–1978)
- Quincy, M.E. (1978) – Mrs. Foster
- Last of the Good Guys (1978, TV Movie) – Fannoy
- Stockard Channing in Just Friends (1979) – Elderly Woman
- 240-Robert (1979) – Sissie
- Valentine (1979, TV Movie) – Birdie
- WKRP in Cincinnati (1980) – Mrs. Butterworth
- Happy Days (1980) – Mrs. Frick – Teacher
- Laverne & Shirley (1981) – Lady #1
- CBS Children's Mystery Theater (1981) – Miss Birdie
- The Love Boat (1981) – Mrs. Smithers
- The Powers of Matthew Star (1982) – Grandma
- Small & Frye (1983) – Sister Rita
- Alice (1983) – Grandma Sharples
- Whiz Kids (1983) – Alma Harrison

== Bibliography ==
- Wilson, Scott; Mank, Gregory W. (2016). Resting Places: The Burial Sites of More Than 14,000 Famous Persons. Jefferson, N.C.: McFarland & Co. ISBN 978-0-7864-7992-4.
