= Joyce Brothers =

American psychologist and columnist (1927–2013)

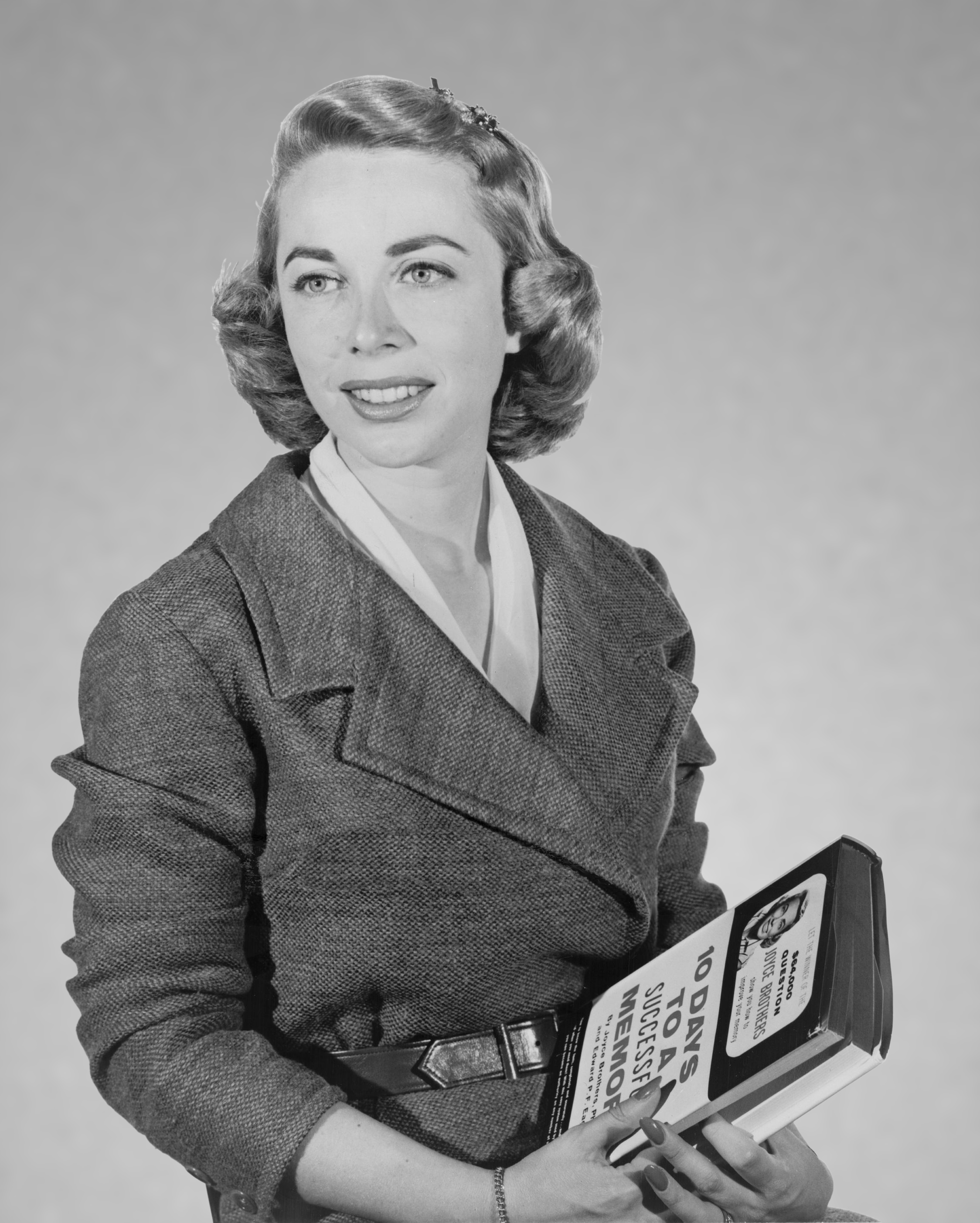
- Brothers in 1957
- Born: Joyce Diane Bauer; October 20, 1927; Brooklyn, New York City, U.S.
- Died: May 13, 2013 (aged 85); Fort Lee, New Jersey, U.S.
- Resting place: Beth David Cemetery
- Education: Cornell University (BA); Columbia University (MA, PhD)
- Occupations: Psychologist; television personality; advice columnist; writer; actress
- Years active: 1955–2013
- Spouse: Milton Brothers (m. 1949; died 1989)
- Children: 1

Joyce Diane Bauer Brothers (October 20, 1927 – May 13, 2013) was an American psychologist, television personality, advice columnist, and author.

In 1955, Brothers gained national prominence after winning the top prize on the television game show The $64,000 Question. Her celebrity led to syndicated advice columns and television programs, establishing her as an early proponent of popular psychology.

Brothers helped introduce psychological concepts into mainstream American culture. Her syndicated columns appeared in newspapers and magazines, including a monthly feature in Good Housekeeping that ran for nearly 40 years. Widely regarded as a public face of the discipline, she made frequent television appearances, usually portraying herself. Beginning in the 1970s, she also took comedic film and television roles that parodied her media persona. Over a career spanning five decades, she was recognized by professional organizations for advancing the role of women in psychology and reducing social stigma surrounding mental health.

== Early life and education ==
Joyce Diane Bauer was born in New York City on October 20, 1927 to attorneys Morris K. Bauer and Estelle Rapport, who operated a joint law practice, and was raised in Far Rockaway, Queens. She had a younger sister, Elaine Goldsmith. Brothers stated that her parents placed an equal emphasis on academic excellence regardless of gender, fostering an environment where she thrived on academic rigor.

Brothers graduated from Far Rockaway High School in January 1944. She enrolled at Cornell University, where she double-majored in home economics and psychology, joined the Sigma Delta Tau sorority, and graduated with honors with a Bachelor of Science in 1947. She pursued graduate study at Columbia University, receiving a Master of Arts in 1949 and a Ph.D. in clinical psychology in 1953. Her doctoral dissertation was titled "Anxiety Avoidance and Escape Behavior as Measured by Action Potential in Muscle". While completing her graduate degrees, she worked as a research assistant at Columbia University, taught at Hunter College, and served as a research fellow on a UNESCO leadership project between 1949 and 1952. A 1952 fellowship from the American Association of University Women enabled her to finish her doctoral studies.

== Career ==
=== Television and radio ===
==== $64,000 Question (1955) ====
Brothers's first television appearance was at the age of 28. At that time, her husband was making $50 a month as a medical intern at Mount Sinai Hospital in New York, which was not enough to support them and their three-year-old daughter. To escape what Brothers called the "slum-like conditions" of her New York City walkup, she was driven to enter as a contestant on the game show The $64,000 Question. The top-charting show had the largest jackpot of all quiz shows at the time.

To become a contestant, Brothers had to write a letter describing herself and her hobbies, explaining why she would make a great contestant, and outlining what she would do with the winnings. Eventually, the letter landed her an interview with Mert Koplin, the show's producer. While in her letter she discussed her qualifications in the field of psychology and home economics, she was not allowed to use her expert knowledge for the show, as The $64,000 Question did not allow participants to be quizzed on topics of their expertise or profession. As such, Brothers had to come up with a new topic area for her to be quizzed on for the show.

With the gender roles of the time in mind, Koplin thought he could draw in the most viewership by juxtaposing Brothers's perceived frailty as a woman with the idea that she knew a great deal about a more masculine field. He is credited with saying Brothers should be given a topic on "something that [she] shouldn't know about... [something like] if it were football or if it were horse racing or boxing...."

Brothers's husband was an avid fan of boxing, so she chose that as her topic. To prepare, she studied twenty-volume boxing encyclopedias and many years' worth of Ring Magazine issues and worked with boxing writer Nat Fleischer and former Olympic boxing champion and New York State Athletic Commissioner Edward P. F. Eagan. After studying, she progressed on the show for several weeks. Despite the show's producers' efforts to stump her at the $16,000 mark by asking questions involving referees rather than the boxers themselves, she exceeded expectations and won the top prize.

Brothers used her photographic memory and focus on learning everything she could and quickly became regarded as an expert in the subject area of boxing. Her success on The $64,000 Question earned Brothers a chance to be the color commentator for CBS during the boxing match between Carmen Basilio and Sugar Ray Robinson. She was said to have been the first female boxing commentator.

Two years later, Brothers appeared on the spin-off series The $64,000 Challenge, which brought in the winners of The $64,000 Question and matched them against experts in the field. Again, Brothers won the maximum prize against seven other competitors. (The combined $128,000 in winnings was equivalent to $1,426,096.42 in 2024.)

While The $64,000 Question and The $64,000 Challenge later came out with cheating scandals of some contestants only pretending to be novices to their respective topic, Brothers was one of the contestants who was cleared of cheating allegations.

==== Sports Showcase (1956) ====
After the success of the quiz show, Brothers co-hosted the Sports Showcase with journalist Max Kase. This role made her one of the early female sports commentators.

==== Local afternoon show on NBC's WRCA-TV ====
Brothers's wish to use her platform to practice psychology was provided through reading letters from people who submitted them to the radio. This opportunity was provided on a four-week basis on NBC's WRCA-TV (now WNBC) in New York City.

==== Appearances on talk shows ====
Brothers appeared on The Tonight Show Starring Johnny Carson as a means for the public to get to know her more than just through her advice columns. With more than 90 appearances on the show, she provided detailed psychological updates on the current social climate of that time. She also appeared on daytime television programs like Good Morning America, Today, Entertainment Tonight, and CNN as well as late-night television shows with Merv Griffin, Mike Douglas, and Conan O’Brien as well as The Steve Allen Show, Body Language, and The Dick Cavett Show.

==== Living Easy with Dr. Joyce Brothers (1973) ====
In efforts to market and promote their new textile fibre Trevira polyester, German chemical company Hoechst provided Brothers with her own show. While Brothers had the opportunity to host her own show and allow the public to learn more about her, the show's ultimate function was to promote Trevira and the company's latest fashions. This goal was evident in almost every aspect of the show, from Brothers's discussions onto the topic of fashion to the production of the set, which was decorated entirely in the Trevira fabric.

The show initially was located in the Broadway Theatre District in New York and moved to Studio 6B at 30 Rockefeller Plaza during its second year. Titled Living Easy with Dr. Joyce Brothers, the show consisted of guest interviews, musical performances, how-to-demos, and a weekly segment dedicated to psychology. Two hundred episodes were produced, airing on 150 stations during its three-year run. The show faced criticisms from stakeholders, and the public believed that there was not enough focus on psychology and that Brothers was failing to incorporate her psychological expertise.

==== Dr. Joyce Brothers Show (1985) ====
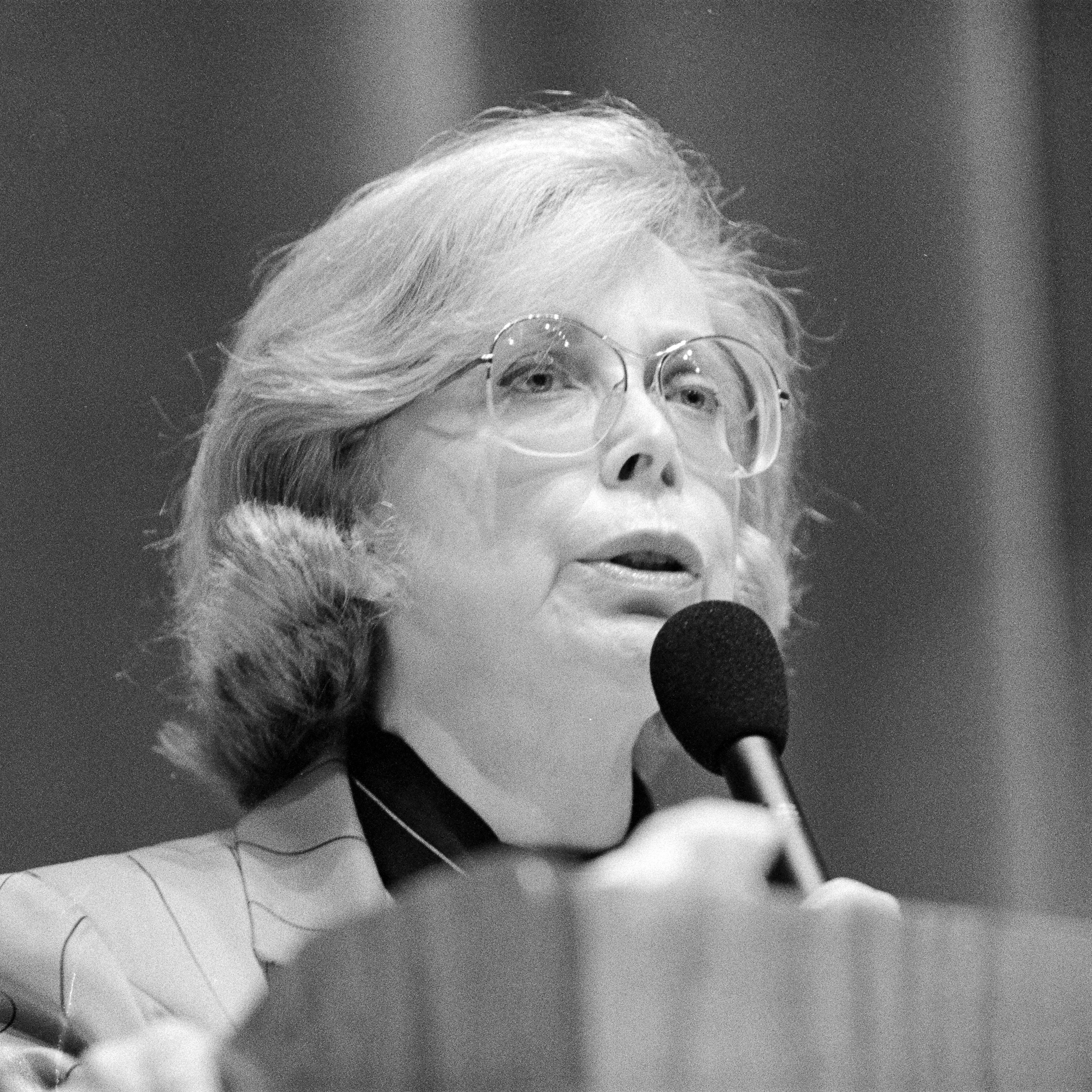
Brothers in 1988

A decade after Living Easy with Dr. Joyce Brothers, Brothers premiered a new show. It consisted of 16 one-hour weekly installments on the Disney Channel. This appearance was her first on cable television. The themes surrounding the show were family-oriented, with each show consisting of a comedian, a special guest star, and calls from viewers to provide advice from a psychological and educational standpoint.

By August 1985, Brothers was given her own television show on a New York station about relationships during which she answered questions from the audience. Sponsors were nervous about whether a television psychologist could succeed, she recalled, but viewers expressed their gratitude for her show, telling her she was giving them the information they could not get elsewhere.

Brothers covered a variety of topics, including prognosis for American football, the psychology of football, women's changing clothing styles, HIV and AIDS, and the rise of school shootings. In essence, Brothers brought psychology to the mainstream media.

Brothers presented syndicated advice shows on both television and radio during a broadcasting career that lasted more than four decades. Her shows changed names numerous times, such as The Dr. Joyce Brothers Show, Consult Dr. Brothers, Tell Me, Dr. Brothers, Ask Dr. Brothers, and Living Easy with Dr. Joyce Brothers. In 1964, she interviewed and posed for publicity photographs with the Beatles on their first visit to the United States.

==== Cameo appearances ====
Brothers appeared as Lillian McGraw in episode 18 of the TV series Ellery Queen. Brothers appeared as a corporate psychologist in season 5 episode 14 of Charlie's Angels. Brothers made cameo appearances as herself in the comedy series Police Squad! and its first spinoff film The Naked Gun, in which she played a baseball announcer. She briefly appeared as herself in a dream sequence in The King of Comedy. She recurred as herself in Madame's Place, consulting with the title character about her neuroses. Brothers appeared as herself in season 3 episode 6 of Mama's Family in the episode titled "Mama and Dr. Brothers". She appeared as herself in season 4 episode 21 of the sitcom Taxi, and in both season 3 and season 5 of the sitcom The Nanny. She voiced an animated version of herself in the episode "Last Exit to Springfield" in season 4 of The Simpsons as well as a season 1 episode of Frasier portraying a "nut". Other appearances include a second-season episode of Entourage, in Married... with Children as a judge, and as designer jeans mogul Vicky Von Vickey in season 3 episode 5 of WKRP in Cincinnati. She also appeared as a crime scene pathologist in the movie National Lampoon's: Loaded Weapon. In Style & Substance, she appeared as herself, the permanent alternate guest on a take-off of Politically Incorrect. She appeared as Mrs. Magwich in season 2 episode 18 of The Love Boat.

=== Newspaper and books ===
Brothers ran a monthly column in Good Housekeeping for almost four decades, and she also wrote a syndicated newspaper column beginning in the 1970s that, at its height, appeared was printed in more than 300 newspapers. She also published several books, including What Every Woman Should Know About Men (1981) and Widowed (1991), inspired by the loss of her husband. Her advice was used as a source for some questions on the 1998–2004 incarnation of Hollywood Squares.

== Impact ==
=== Social conversation ===
Brothers was viewed as the public crisis counselor, as she was asked to comment on issues, such as the death of Diana, Princess of Wales and the explosion of the Challenger space shuttle.

In 1972, Brothers addressed homosexuality in her newspaper column. After the 1999 Columbine school shooting, she was a persistent presence on CNN, expressing her support for gun control legislation.

More memorable episodes of her advice shows include when she helped a man on air who called in contemplating suicide as a result of being blind in one eye and nearly blind in the other. Her efforts included keeping him on air for 30 minutes — long enough for National Save-A-Life to contact him. In another episode aired in 1971, a woman called and threatened to overdose on sleeping pills. As this was a riveting circumstance, the show was left running for three more hours uninterrupted, so that Brothers was able to extract a phone number from the woman to get an ambulance to her.

=== Sexism ===
Upon receiving acceptance into Columbia University for her Ph.D., the dean of her department told her that, while her qualifications were impeccable, she was taking the position of a man who would use the degree and that it would therefore be best if she dropped her position. However, Brothers did not waver and maintained her position.

Brothers believed that her husband should be the breadwinner. She gave up pursuing a career in psychology for herself because it could mean being in competition with her husband. Early in her career, when Brothers was asked by women for advice on what to do if their husbands showed interest in other women, Brothers was known to ask the caller to look at themselves and ask what they could do to be more like the women their husbands seemed to chase. Brothers later became more involved with issues of women's rights. In 1972, she was one of many who testified in front of the platform committee on women's issues, also serving as acting chair of a U.S. delegation for the 16th assembly of the Inter-American Commission of Women. In 1979, she provided proposals at the congressional hearing on "problems of mid-life women", speaking on employment, retirement income, and anti-ageism in television characters.

== Legacy ==
=== Controversy surrounding Brothers's pop psychology ===
As her fame grew, there was an increase in disapproval among psychologists and psychiatrists. They questioned both the validity of her psychological claims and her authority in providing psychological advice. A growing number of psychologists began to believe the advice she provided to her audience was unethical in that she did not hold any clinical degree and she was giving advice to strangers, not to patients with whom she had professional relationships. Gwendolyn Stevens and Sheldon Gardener, the authors of The Women of Psychology, stated that "traditional psychologists smile subtly when her name is mentioned and they often complain that she actually does more damage than good." There were many attempts by American Psychological Association members to revoke Brothers's membership; they objected to the form in which Brothers's advice was provided. Although her membership was never revoked, Brothers's public professional activities caused uproar in the community.

=== De-stigmatizing psychology ===
Despite the criticism, at the end of one of Brothers's TV appearances in December 1958, Roger Turtle and Brothers discussed the logistics behind her TV appearances. 15 hours were spent preparing for each show, with consultations with other professionals and the breakdown of the field of psychology to be understood in everyday language. During the shows, there were many references to scientific research and explicit statements that psychology is a service, not simply a source of entertainment. The shows provided a platform to "professionalize and de-stigmatize psychology". Mental health was stigmatized and not as covered in the media, but Brothers strived to contribute significantly to giving people a different perspective. Her show allowed the public to view psychologists as real people.

An influx of letters were sent from people requesting advice for several topics, such as marriage, parenting, work, money, and taboo topics like menopause, infidelity and sex. Brothers' light on these topics assisted in normalizing these within the mainstream media, with an emphasis of therapy's importance for addressing everyday issues and not only for mental illness.

=== Honors and awards ===
Brothers was recognized with the following honors and awards: Women of Achievement Award, Federation of Jewish Women (1964); Professional Woman of the Year, Business and Professional Women's Club (1968); Award of the Parkinson Disease Foundation. She was given an honorary degree, the L.H.D., from Franklin Pierce College in 1969.

== Personal life ==
In 1949, Brothers married Milton Brothers, who later became an internist. In 1989, Milton died from bladder cancer. Following his death, Brothers fell into a state of depression for a year and contemplated suicide; however, she used her work to achieve inner peace and recover. Brothers and her husband had a daughter, four grandchildren and two great-grandchildren.

== Death ==
On May 13, 2013, Brothers died at her home in Fort Lee, New Jersey. Lisa Brothers Arbisser, her daughter, said that respiratory failure was the cause.
