= Johnny Yune =

South Korean-American actor and comedian (1936–2020)

- 자니윤
- Born: Yoon Jong-seung; October 22, 1936; Eumseong, North Chungcheong, Japanese Korea
- Died: March 8, 2020 (aged 83); Alhambra, California, U.S.
- Citizenship: South Korea; United States (after 1978)
- Education: Ohio Wesleyan University
- Occupations: Actor, singer, comedian, writer, host
- Years active: 1974–2004
- Spouse: Julia Yune (m. 1999; div. 2010)

Korean name
- Hangul: 윤종승
- Hanja: 尹鍾承
- RR: Yun Jongseung
- MR: Yun Chongsŭng

Yoon Jong-seung (Korean: 윤종승; October 22, 1936 – March 8, 2020), known as Johnny Yune, was a South Korean and American actor, comedian, and singer. He was best known for starring in the cult comedy film They Call Me Bruce? (1982), and its sequel They Still Call Me Bruce (1987).

== Early life ==
Yune was born Yoon Jong-seung in 1936 in Eumseong County, Chungcheongbuk-do Province, South Korea (then under Japanese rule). He graduated from Sungdong High School in Sindang-dong neighborhood of Seoul, and came to the United States on an ROK Navy scholarship in 1962. He studied vocal music at Ohio Wesleyan University.

He became a U.S. citizen in 1978, at which point he anglicized his first name to "John", due to its phonetic similarity.

== Career ==
In 1964, Yune practiced his stand-up routine in places such as the Cafe Tel Aviv at 250 West 72nd Street, New York City. In 1977, he was discovered at a Santa Monica comedy club by comedian Johnny Carson and was invited to appear on his talk show, The Tonight Show Starring Johnny Carson. His first appearance on the show, in February 1979, became his big break because actor Charlton Heston, who was supposed to be the main guest for the night, did not arrive on time. As a result, Yune was given over 20 minutes on the show, during which he performed a stand-up set, spoke with Carson and sang "'O sole mio". Carson liked Yune and had him on the show 34 times in the 1970s and '80s, making Yune one of the show's most frequent guests for a stand-up comedian.

In 1977, on the December 13th episode of M*A*S*H titled "Comrades in Arms, Part 2" at 7 mins 47 seconds, Yune appeared in a walk-on role as "Korean Soldier"...Jon Yune

Yune also appeared in his own special on NBC.

He played a Mongolian named "Jon Yune" in the 1979 movie Meteor, and performed as a stand-up comedian in the 1980s.

Yune performed at the 1988 Summer Olympics at Seoul, along with Bob Hope and Brooke Shields.

From 1989 to 1990, he hosted The Johnny Yune Show (자니윤쇼), the first Americanized talk show in Korea. Singer Jo Young-nam was a co-MC. The show was a hit, but only after a year, Yune decided to leave KBS due to limited freedom of the media.

=== Politics ===
Yune was an alternate delegate at the 1988 Republican National Convention, where he sang the U.S. national anthem on August 16, 1988.

He was appointed auditor of the Korea Tourism Organization in 2014 by the Park Geun-hye administration. His appointment provoked controversy, as his critics questioned his lack of business experience and close ties to the then-president. He held the job for two years.

== Personal life ==
Johnny Yune married a Korean American named Julia Yune in 1999; they divorced in 2010. He regained his South Korean citizenship in 2013.

=== Health issues and death ===
Yune was diagnosed with dementia in 2017. He died in Southern California on March 8, 2020, at the age of 83; per his wishes his body was donated to medical science.

== Filmography ==
Year	Title	Role	Notes
1977	M*A*S*H	Korean Soldier	Season 6 - Episode 14 "Comrades In Arms, Part 2" (credited as Jon Yune)
1979	Meteor	Siberian man	(as Jon Yune)
1980	The Love Boat	Korean Stand-Up Comedian	Episode: "Not So Fast, Gopher/Haven't We Met Before?/Seoul Mates" (not "Foreign Exchange", per The Love Boat opening credits)
1981	The Cannonball Run	TV Talk Show Host	
1982	They Call Me Bruce?	Bruce / Grandfather	
1985	Gidget's Summer Reunion	Johnny Soon	TV movie
1986	Nothing in Common	Mr. Yung	
1987	They Still Call Me Bruce	Bruce	
1988	Hamburger Johnny		
1989	The Johnny Yune Show	TV Talk Show Host	KBS
1993	Western Avenue		
