= The Dean Martin Celebrity Roast =

American comedy TV series (1974–1984)

- Genre: Variety/Comedy
- Written by: David Axelroad, Bill Daley, Stan Burns, Mike Marmer, Peter Gallay, Arthur Philips
- Directed by: Greg Garrison
- Presented by: Dean Martin
- Country of origin: United States
- Original language: English
- No. of seasons: 10
- No. of episodes: 54: 29 Specials, 25 as Dean Martin Show segment

Production
- Producer: Greg Garrison
- Running time: Varies

Original release
- Network: NBC
- Release: October 31, 1974 – December 7, 1984

Related
- The Dean Martin Show

The Dean Martin Celebrity Roast is an American series of television specials hosted by entertainer Dean Martin and airing from 1974 to 1984. For a series of 54 specials and shows, Martin and his friends would "roast" a celebrity. The roasts were patterned after the roasts held at the New York Friars' Club.

== History ==
In 1973, The Dean Martin Show was declining in popularity. In its final season, to pick up the ratings and to require less of Martin's involvement, it was retooled into a series of celebrity roasts by adding a feature called "Man of the Week Celebrity Roast." The roasts seemed to be popular among television audiences and are often marketed in post-issues as part of the official Dean Martin Celebrity Roasts and not The Dean Martin Show.

After The Dean Martin Show was cancelled in 1974, NBC drew up a contract with Martin to do several specials and do more roast specials. Starting with Bob Hope in 1974, the roast was taped in California and turned out to be a hit, leading to many other roasts to follow.

In the fall of 1974, the roasts moved permanently to the MGM Grand Hotel's Ziegfeld Room in Las Vegas and mainly aired Thursdays on NBC. The televised roasts were popular in the ratings; however Martin and NBC declined to extend the 10-year contract. Some segments were taped prior to or after the roast, due to considerations with the performer or technical aspects. No roasts were broadcast between 1980 and 1983 (partly due to the MGM Grand fire of 1980), with the specials returning for a few final installments in 1984. The show's official title as a television special would change based on the celebrity; in James Stewart's case for instance, it would be the Dean Martin Celebrity Roast: Jimmy Stewart.

== Format ==
The roastmaster (Martin), the roastee, and the roasters would be seated on a dais. The roastees were also referred to as "Man of the Hour", "Woman of the Hour", or "Man of the Week" in earlier episodes.

Every roast began with an introduction by roastmaster Martin, with jokes about the celebrity in question. He would then introduce each member of the dais, who would take turns adding insults or jokes about the honoree. For example, during the roast of Bette Davis, veteran actor Henry Fonda said that "I've been close to Bette Davis for thirty-eight years - and I have the cigarette burns to prove it." In the end, the honoree would have their chance to insult the roastmaster and members of the dais.

In two instances, a pair of celebrities were roasted at the same time: Jack Klugman and Tony Randall, and Dan Rowan and Dick Martin. Only one person was honored posthumously, George Washington, who was honored for the upcoming United States Bicentennial (veteran historical impersonator Jan Leighton portrayed Washington for the episode while Audrey Meadows portrayed his wife, Martha). Michael Landon, Redd Foxx, Joe Namath, and Jack Klugman (with Tony Randall in 1973 and alone in 1978) were the only celebrities roasted twice; Landon's second time, in 1984, being the final roast. Don Rickles hosted the roast of Dean Martin and assumed the role of Roastmaster.

Comedian Foster Brooks appeared the most often on the roast with each appearing 30 times. While most of the participants were comedians known for their work in such events, occasionally unexpected participants would be featured, such as British pop singer Petula Clark who was recruited to help roast TV actor William Conrad in 1973.

== Episodes ==
=== As a segment on The Dean Martin Show ===
1. Governor Ronald Reagan, September 14, 1973 (Show #904)
- Roasters: Jack Benny, Dom DeLuise, Phyllis Diller, Pat Henry, Nancy Reagan, Don Rickles, Nipsey Russell, Mark Spitz, Jackie Vernon, Jonathan Winters
2. Hugh Hefner, September 21, 1973 (Show #901)
- Roasters: Billy Baxter, Joey Bishop, Howard Cosell, Jackie Gayle, Tom T. Hall, Dick Martin, Audrey Meadows
3. Ed McMahon, September 28, 1973 (Show #902)
- Roasters: Charo, Ernest Borgnine, Pat Buttram, Jack Carter, Dom DeLuise, Steve Landesberg, Jackie Vernon, Dionne Warwick
4. William Conrad, October 5, 1973 (Show #903)
- Roasters: Petula Clark, Phyllis Diller, Jackie Gayle, Bob Newhart, Nipsey Russell
5. Kirk Douglas, October 12, 1973 (Show #905)
- Roasters: Lynn Anderson, Jack Burns, Norm Crosby, Jackie Gayle, Ted Knight, Rich Little, Don Rickles, Avery Schreiber
6. Bette Davis, October 19, 1973 (Show #909)
- Roasters: Army Archerd, Pat Buttram, Howard Cosell, Henry Fonda, Joyce Haber, Barbara Heller, Kay Medford, Vincent Price, Nipsey Russell
7. Senator Barry Goldwater, October 26, 1973 (Show #907)
- Roasters: William Conrad, Norm Crosby, Zsa Zsa Gabor, William Holden, Steve Landesberg, Carroll O'Connor, Donald Rice, Dan Rowan, Mark Russell
8. Johnny Carson, November 2, 1973 (Show #914)
- Roasters: Jack Benny, Joey Bishop, Foster Brooks, George Burns, Ruth Buzzi, Truman Capote, Bette Davis, Fred DeCordova, Dom DeLuise, Redd Foxx, George Gobel, Barry Goldwater, Rich Little, Kent McCord, Martin Milner, Louisa Moritz, Bob Newhart, Cliff Robertson, Doc Severinsen, Dionne Warwick, Jonathan Winters
9. Wilt Chamberlain, November 9, 1973 (Show #911)
- Roasters: Ken Berry, Norm Crosby, Jackie Gayle, Happy Hairston, George Kennedy, Audrey Meadows, Nipsey Russell, Vernon Scott, Bill Shoemaker
10. Senator and former Vice President Hubert Humphrey, November 23, 1973 (Show #913)
- Roasters: Foster Brooks, Leo Durocher, Pat Henry, Gene Kelly, Ted Knight, Rich Little, Audrey Meadows, Donald Rice, Mark Russell, Nipsey Russell, Mort Sahl, Lowell Weicker
11. Carroll O'Connor, December 7, 1973 (Show #908)
- Roasters: Marty Allen, Elsie Birdwell, Joey Bishop, Foster Brooks, Ruth Buzzi, Mike Connors, William Conrad, Norm Crosby, Cass Elliot, Redd Foxx, Zsa Zsa Gabor, Barry Goldwater, William Holden, Gene Kelly, John Lindsay, Dick Martin, Donald O'Connor, Charles Nelson Reilly, Don Rickles, Dan Rowan, Nipsey Russell, Ward Wood, Robert Wood
12. Monty Hall, December 14, 1973 (Show #912)
- Roasters: Birch Bayh, Jack Carter, Rocky Graziano, Gene Kelly, Art Linkletter, Audrey Meadows, Donald O'Connor, Bert Parks
13. Jack Klugman & Tony Randall, December 21, 1973 (Show #910)
- Roasters: Leonard Barr, Gary Burghoff, Ruth Buzzi, Jack Carter, Mike Connors, Doug Kershaw, Loretta Lynn, Laffit Pincay, Jr., Soupy Sales, Jackie Vernon
14. Zsa Zsa Gabor, January 11, 1974 (Show #906)
- Roasters: Ruth Buzzi, Sue Cameron, Donna Fargo, Buddy Hackett, Corbett Monica, Donald O'Connor, Charles Nelson Reilly, Lonnie Schorr, Mel Tillis
15. Leo Durocher, January 18, 1974 (Show #917)
- Roasters: Foster Brooks, Jack Carter, Chuck Connors, Dizzy Dean, Alex Karras, Gene Kelly, Gladys Knight, Bobby Riggs, Maury Wills
16. Truman Capote, January 25, 1974 (Show #920)
- Roasters: Foster Brooks, Rocky Graziano, Ted Knight, Rich Little, Audrey Meadows, Anna Moffo, Donald O'Connor, Johnny Russell, Jean Simmons, Joseph Wambaugh
17. Don Rickles, February 8, 1974 (Show #918)
- Roasters: Joey Bishop, Foster Brooks, Charlie Callas, Eugene Cernan, Carol Channing, Phyllis Diller, Kirk Douglas, Lorne Greene, Pat Henry, Casey Kasem, Jack Klugman, Rich Little, Dick Martin, Bob Newhart, Cliff Robertson, Dan Rowan, Nipsey Russell, Telly Savalas, George C. Scott
18. Ralph Nader, February 15, 1974 (Show #919)
- Roasters: James Brolin, Foster Brooks, Ruth Buzzi, Donna Fargo, Jackie Gayle, Jack Klugman, Steve Landesberg, Rich Little, Mort Sahl, Jane Withers
19. Jack Benny, February 22, 1974 (Show #923)
- Roasters: Pearl Bailey, Joey Bishop, Foster Brooks, Gary Burghoff, George Burns, Jack Carter, Norm Crosby, Florence Henderson, Rich Little, Dick Martin, Zubin Mehta, Wayne Newton, Mark Spitz, Jimmy Stewart, Demond Wilson,
20. Redd Foxx, March 1, 1974 (Show #915)
- Roasters: Jim Bailey, John Barbour, Joey Bishop, Foster Brooks, Norm Crosby, Jackie Gayle, Rich Little, LaWanda Page, Don Rickles, Nipsey Russell, Slappy White, Demond Wilson
21. Bobby Riggs, March 6, 1974 (Show #916)
- Roasters: Lynn Anderson, Jack Carter, Rosemary Casals, Chuck Connors, Leo Durocher, Alex Karras, Wayne Newton, Vincent Price, Don Rice
22. George Washington (portrayed by Jan Leighton), March 15, 1974 (Show #922)
- Roasters: Leonard Barr, Foster Brooks (as Washington's press secretary), Jack Carter, Euell Gibbons, Steve Lawrence (as Washington's aide-de-camp), Dick Martin, Audrey Meadows (as Martha Washington), Corbett Monica, Nipsey Russell, Henny Youngman
23. Dan Rowan & Dick Martin, March 25, 1974
- Roasters: Joey Bishop, Foster Brooks, Ruth Buzzi, Richard Dawson, Arte Johnson, Steve Lawrence, Audrey Meadows, Bob Newhart, Nipsey Russell
24. Hank Aaron, March 29, 1974 (Show #921)
- Roasters: Lynn Anderson, Jackie Bavene, Joey Bishop, Foster Brooks, Norm Crosby, Dizzy Dean, Eddie Mathews, Audrey Meadows, Lou Rawls, Jeannie Rineal, Rodney Allen Rippy, Nipsey Russell
25. Joe Namath, April 5, 1974 (Show #925)
- Roasters: Joey Bishop, Foster Brooks, Paul "Bear" Bryant, Charlie Callas, Dick Butkus, Angie Dickinson, Weeb Ewbank, David Janssen, Rich Little, Audrey Meadows, Don Meredith, Corbett Monica, Jim Plunkett, Nipsey Russell, Fulton J. Sheen, Slappy White

=== As The Dean Martin Celebrity Roast ===
26. Bob Hope, October 31, 1974 (Show #1001)
- Roasters: Neil Armstrong, Johnny Bench, Jack Benny, Milton Berle, Omar Bradley, Foster Brooks, Howard Cosell, Phyllis Diller, Zsa Zsa Gabor, Billy Graham, Dolores Hope, Henry Kissinger, Rich Little, Ronald Reagan, Don Rickles, Sugar Ray Robinson, Ginger Rogers, Nipsey Russell, Mark Spitz, James Stewart, John Wayne, Flip Wilson
27. Telly Savalas, November 15, 1974
- Roasters: Ernest Borgnine, Foster Brooks, Howard Cosell, Dom DeLuise, Angie Dickinson, Phyllis Diller, Peter Graves, Casey Kasem, Alex Karras, George Kennedy, Rich Little, Dick Martin, Darren McGavin, Don Rickles, Richard Roundtree, Dan Rowan, Nipsey Russell, Robert Stack, Shelley Winters
28. Lucille Ball, February 8, 1975
- Roasters: Jack Benny, Milton Berle, Foster Brooks, Ruth Buzzi, Phyllis Diller, Totie Fields, Gale Gordon, Henry Fonda, Bob Hope, Dick Martin, Rich Little, Gary Morton, Don Rickles, Ginger Rogers, Dan Rowan, Nipsey Russell, Vivian Vance. Note:* This roast was Jack Benny's last television appearance, airing five weeks after his death in December 1974.
29. Jackie Gleason, February 27, 1975
- Roasters: Milton Berle, Foster Brooks, Sid Caesar, Art Carney, Phyllis Diller, Frank Gorshin, Jane Kean, Gene Kelly, Sheila MacRae, Audrey Meadows, Nipsey Russell, Danny Thomas, Sandy Herdt
30. Sammy Davis Jr., April 25, 1975 (Show #1005)
- Roasters: Milton Berle, Joey Bishop, Foster Brooks, Wilt Chamberlain, Norm Crosby, Altovise Davis, Phyllis Diller, Frank Gorshin, Jan Murray, Freddie Prinze, Don Rickles, Nipsey Russell, Danny Thomas, Dionne Warwick
31. Michael Landon, May 16, 1975
- Roasters: Amanda Blake, Joey Bishop, Ernest Borgnine, Sid Caesar, Norm Crosby, Phyllis Diller, Euell Gibbons, Lorne Greene, Guy Marks, Jan Murray, Don Rickles, Cliff Robertson, Victor Sen Yung
32. Evel Knievel, November 10, 1975
- Roasters: Milton Berle, Ernest Borgnine, Joyce Brothers, Ruth Buzzi, Glen Campbell, Charlie Callas, William Conrad, Jackie Cooper, Georgia Engel, Barry Goldwater, Sandy Herdt, Gabe Kaplan, Audrey Meadows, Don Rickles, Cliff Robertson, Nipsey Russell, Isabel Sanford, McLean Stevenson
33. Valerie Harper, November 20, 1975
- Roasters: Jack Albertson, Edward Asner, Milton Berle, Red Buttons, Foster Brooks, Jack Carter, Phyllis Diller, Georgia Engel, Chad Everett, Jamie Farr, Eva Gabor, Harold Gould, David Groh, Julie Kavner, Rich Little, Nipsey Russell, Isabel Sanford, Richard Schaal, Nancy Walker, Shelley Winters
34. Muhammad Ali, February 19, 1976
- Roasters: Red Buttons, Foster Brooks, Ruth Buzzi, Charlie Callas, Wilt Chamberlain, Howard Cosell, Billy Crystal, Georgia Engel, Rocky Graziano, Sherman Hemsley, Gabe Kaplan, Gene Kelly, Tony Orlando, Floyd Patterson, Freddie Prinze, Nipsey Russell, Isabel Sanford, Orson Welles
35. Dean Martin, February 27, 1976
- Roasters: Muhammad Ali, Joey Bishop, Foster Brooks, Ruth Buzzi, Charlie Callas, Howard Cosell, Angie Dickinson, Georgia Engel, Barry Goldwater, Bob Hope, Hubert Humphrey, Gabe Kaplan, Gene Kelly, Rich Little, Paul Lynde, Dick Martin, Joe Namath, Tony Orlando, Don Rickles (Roastmaster), Dan Rowan, Nipsey Russell, James Stewart, John Wayne, Orson Welles
36. Dennis Weaver, April 27, 1976
- Roasters: Milton Berle, Amanda Blake, Foster Brooks, Red Buttons, Ruth Buzzi, J. D. Cannon, Mike Connors, William Conrad, Georgia Engel, Steve Forrest, Zsa Zsa Gabor, Peter Graves, George Hamilton, Jim Hutton, Sheldon Leonard, Rich Little, Martin Milner, Nipsey Russell, Milburn Stone, Shelley Winters
37. Joe Garagiola, May 25, 1976
- Roasters: Hank Aaron, Yogi Berra, Foster Brooks, Red Buttons, Charlie Callas, Jack Carter, Norm Crosby, Charlie Finley, Jackie Gayle, Pat Henry, Shirley Jones, Gabe Kaplan, Mickey Mantle, Willie Mays, Stan Musial, Nipsey Russell, Luis Tiant, Orson Welles, Maury Wills
38. Redd Foxx, November 26, 1976
- Roasters: Marty Allen, Steve Allen, Milton Berle, Norm Crosby, Joe Garagiola, Isaac Hayes, George Kirby, LaWanda Page, Don Rickles, Nipsey Russell, Isabel Sanford, Liz Torres, Abe Vigoda, Jimmie Walker, Orson Welles, Slappy White
39. Danny Thomas, December 15, 1976
- Roasters: Charo, Lucille Ball, Milton Berle, Red Buttons, Ruth Buzzi, Charlie Callas, Howard Cosell, Dena Dietrich, Gene Kelly, Don Knotts, Harvey Korman, Jan Murray, Nipsey Russell, Jimmie Walker, Orson Welles
40. Angie Dickinson, February 8, 1977
- Roasters: Eve Arden, Joey Bishop, Foster Brooks, Red Buttons, Ruth Buzzi, Charlie Callas, Scatman Crothers, Earl Holliman, Jackie Mason, LaWanda Page, Juliet Prowse, Rex Reed, Cathy Rigby, James Stewart, Jimmie Walker, Orson Welles, Cindy Williams
41. Gabe Kaplan, February 21, 1977
- Roasters: Charo, Johnny Bench, Milton Berle, Ed Bluestone, Red Buttons, Charlie Callas, Howard Cosell, Billy Crystal, Joe Garagiola, Alice Ghostley, George Kirby, Nipsey Russell, Liz Torres, Abe Vigoda, Jimmie Walker, Orson Welles
42. Ted Knight, March 2, 1977
- Roasters: Edward Asner, Foster Brooks, Red Buttons, Jack Carter, Scatman Crothers, Georgia Engel, Harvey Korman, Gavin MacLeod, Jackie Mason, Julie McWhirter, Kelly Monteith, LaWanda Page, Renée Richards, James Stewart, Willie Tyler & Lester, Jimmie Walker, Orson Welles, Paul Williams,
43. Peter Marshall, May 2, 1977
- Roasters: Joey Bishop, Ed Bluestone, Foster Brooks, Red Buttons, Jack Carter, Wayland Flowers & Madam, Zsa Zsa Gabor, Jackie Gayle, Paul Lynde, Rose Marie, Vincent Price, Rip Taylor, Karen Valentine, Jimmie Walker, Orson Welles
44. Dan Haggerty, November 2, 1977
- Roasters: Foster Brooks, Red Buttons, Ruth Buzzi, Charlie Callas, William Conrad, Tom Dreesen, Jackie Gayle, Rich Little, Marilyn Michaels, Roger Miller, LaWanda Page, Denver Pyle, Abe Vigoda, Jimmie Walker, Orson Welles,
45. Frank Sinatra, February 7, 1978
- Roasters: Milton Berle, Ernest Borgnine, George Burns, Red Buttons, Ruth Buzzi, Dom DeLuise, Charlie Callas as "Carlo Cappuccino", Peter Falk as Columbo, Redd Foxx, Gene Kelly, Jack Klugman, Rich Little, Barbara Marx, LaWanda Page, Ronald Reagan, Don Rickles, Jilly Rizzo, Telly Savalas, James Stewart, Orson Welles, Flip Wilson, Jonathan Winters
46. Jack Klugman, March 17, 1978
- Roasters: Milton Berle, Joey Bishop, Foster Brooks, Joyce Brothers, Red Buttons, Ruth Buzzi, Phyllis Diller, Robert Guillaume, Katherine Helmond, Abbe Lane, Dick Martin, LaWanda Page, Tony Randall, Don Rickles, Connie Stevens
47. Betty White, May 6, 1978
- Roasters: Milton Berle, Foster Brooks, Red Buttons, Charlie Callas, Phyllis Diller, Georgia Engel, Bonnie Franklin, Dan Haggerty, John Hillerman, Rich Little, Allen Ludden, Peter Marshall, LaWanda Page, Abe Vigoda, Jimmie Walker, Orson Welles
48. Jimmy Stewart, May 10, 1978 (Show #1306)
- Roasters: Eddie Albert, June Allyson, Lucille Ball, Milton Berle, Foster Brooks, George Burns, Red Buttons, Ruth Buzzi, Henry Fonda, Greer Garson, Barry Goldwater, Janet Leigh, Rich Little, LaWanda Page, Tony Randall, Don Rickles, Mickey Rooney, Orson Welles, Jesse White
49. George Burns, May 17, 1978
- Roasters: Milton Berle, Red Buttons, Ruth Buzzi, Charlie Callas, Jack Carter, Dom DeLuise, Phyllis Diller, Tom Dreesen, Gene Kelly, LaWanda Page, Ronald Reagan, Don Rickles, Connie Stevens, James Stewart, Abe Vigoda, Frank Welker, Orson Welles
50. Suzanne Somers, November 21, 1978
- Roasters: Paul Anka, Milton Berle, Tom Bosley, Joyce Brothers, Red Buttons, Ruth Buzzi, Charlie Callas, David Doyle, Norman Fell, Zsa Zsa Gabor, Jackie Gayle, Norm Crosby, Lorne Greene, Bernie Kopell, Audra Lindley, Rich Little, Lee Meriwether, LaWanda Page
51. Joe Namath, January 19, 1979
- Roasters: Milton Berle, Joey Bishop, George Blanda, Tom Bosley, Norm Crosby, Dick Butkus, Red Buttons, Ruth Buzzi, Charlie Callas, Angie Dickinson, David Doyle, Jackie Gayle, Sandy Herdt, Bruce Jenner, Bernie Kopell, Rich Little, Lee Meriwether, Mel Tillis, Jimmie Walker, Orson Welles
52. Joan Collins, February 23, 1984
- Roasters: Bea Arthur, Anne Baxter, Milton Berle, Red Buttons, Charlie Callas, Dom DeLuise, Angie Dickinson, Phyllis Diller, John Forsythe, Zsa Zsa Gabor, Rich Little, Gavin MacLeod, Don Rickles, Aaron Spelling
53. Mr. T, March 14, 1984
- Roasters: Red Buttons, Nell Carter, Gary Coleman, Howard Cosell, Bob Hope, Ann Jillian, Rich Little, Gavin MacLeod, Maureen Murphy, George Peppard, Don Rickles, Ricky Schroder, Dick Shawn, Slappy White
54. Michael Landon, December 7, 1984
- Roasters: Dick Butkus, Norm Crosby, Melissa Gilbert, Lorne Greene, Pat Harrington Jr., Brian Keith, Rich Little, Maureen Murphy, Merlin Olsen, Don Rickles, Dick Shawn, Bubba Smith, Vic Tayback, Orson Welles, Slappy White

== Home media ==
The Dean Martin Celebrity Roasts were released on DVD through Guthy-Renker with some of The Dean Martin Show roasts selected as part of the package. The show is one of the most sold video sets of all time. NBC Universal brought suit against producer Greg Garrison and Guthy-Renker for selling The Dean Martin Show DVDs; the suit did not affect the Celebrity Roasts. All 54 of the Celebrity Roasts are included in the 23-disc boxset Dean Martin Celebrity Roasts: Complete DVD Collection released October 15, 2013 by Time Life.

== Syndication ==
In recent years The Dean Martin Celebrity Roast has been shown on Decades and its successor network Catchy Comedy as a "Weekend Binge" (later renamed "The Catchy Binge") and as a "Thanksgiving Roast" marathon on Thanksgiving Day. Catchy Comedy presented a "Catchy Binge" of the series on August 5–6, 2023.

Newsmax2 acquired rights to the series in 2026.
