= Greatest Hits on Monument (Connie Smith album) =

Greatest hits album by Connie Smith
- Released: March 9, 1993
- Recorded: 1977–1979
- Genre: Country pop
- Length: 37:58
- Label: Sony
- Producer: Ray Baker

Connie Smith chronology
The Best of Connie Smith (1989)	Greatest Hits on Monument (1993)	Live in Branson, MO, USA (1993)

Greatest Hits on Monument is a compilation album by American country artist, Connie Smith. The album was released March 9, 1993, on Sony Music Entertainment and was produced by Ray Baker. The album was collection Smith's singles and other tracks recorded during her three years at Monument Records (1977–1979).

== Background ==
Greatest Hits on Monument contained fourteen tracks of material Smith had recorded under Monument Records. The album contained Smith's seven singles released under the label. The album's biggest hit single was Smith's cover version of Andy Gibb's Pop hit, "I Just Want to Be Your Everything," which reached #14 on the Billboard Country Chart in 1978, which Allmusic critic, Stephen Thomas Erlewine called, "relatively faithful" to the original version. The album's material was a departure from any of Smith's previous recordings for RCA Records or Columbia Records in the 1960s and 1970s. During her years at Monument, Smith largely recorded Country pop material that also mixed with Adult Contemporary and Disco. Erlewine called the album's production, "soothing and mellow," despite he wasn't largely pleased with the album. The album's other singles from her years at Monument included the #34 hit, "Lovin' You Baby" and her first single for the label, "Coming Around." The additional singles ("They'll Never Be Another for Me," "Smooth Sailin'," "Ten Thousand and One," and "Don't Say Love") reached lower positions on the Billboard Country Chart.

== Critical reception ==
Professional ratings
Review scores
Source	Rating
Allmusic	2.5/5 stars

Overall, Greatest Hits on Monument did not gain positive feedback. Allmusic reviewer Stephen Thomas Erlewine gave the album two and a half out five stars, saying that fans did not like these recordings, stating "It's easy to see why fans of pure country -- the kind of music Connie Smith effortlessly made during the '60s -- are not crazy about her late-'70s recordings for Monument. Once she signed with the label in 1977, country was pretty much a thing of the past for her, as she delved not just into country-pop, but into heavily produced adult contemporary ballads and big, shiny disco-influenced pop numbers -- surely not the kind of thing to please purists." Erlewine also said that he did not find the music similar to that of the Urban Cowboy movement in country music around that time, saying, "...it's not a very good showcase for her talents, nor is it very good as crossover pop -- it's too square and middle of the road, making the urban cowboy bubbling up at the time seem risky and edgy."

Slipcue.com also reviewed the album and was also not pleased with it. The website stated that there was "better material buried on her various late-'70s Monument LPs" (Pure Connie Smith and New Horizons). The website concluded that the music was, "Definitely not her best material, and also not well-chosen from this particular era... You're much better off searching out the old, original albums."

== Track listing ==
No.	Title	Writer(s)	Length
1.	"Coming Around"	Red Lane	2:26
2.	"You and Love and I"	Warner Robb, Sanger D. Shafer	2:55
3.	"I Just Want to Be Your Everything"	Barry Gibb	3:16
4.	"Lovin' You Baby"	Jo Ann Campbell Seals, Troy Seals	2:31
5.	"All of a Sudden"	Steve Collom	2:33
6.	"There'll Never Be Another for Me"	John Colley, Dan Seals, Parker McGee	2:42
7.	"Lovin' You, Lovin Me"	Sonny Throckmorton	2:40
8.	"The Wayward Wind"	Stanley Lebowsky, Herb Newman	2:40
9.	"Smooth Sailin'"	Curly Putman, Throckmorton	2:29
10.	"Loving You Has Sure Been Good to Me"	Dallas Frazier, Earl Montgomery	2:33
11.	"Ten Thousand and One"	Pat Bunch, Dan Mitchell	2:49
12.	"Don't Say Love"	Jim Glaser, Jimmy Payne	3:06
13.	"I Don't Want to Be Free"	Paul Craft	2:12
14.	"Don't Make Me Dream (If Dreamin' Can't Come True)"	Wanada Mallette, Bob Morrison	3:06
