= Joey Dee and the Starliters =

American musical group

- Genre: Rock and roll
- Years active: 1958–present
- Labels: Scepter, Roulette
- Members: Joey Dee
- Past members: David Brigati; Larry Vernieri; Carlton Lattimore; Sam Taylor; Willie Davis; Bill Callanan

Joey Dee and the Starliters (also credited as Joey Dee and the Starlighters) is an American popular music group. The group is best known for their million-selling recording "Peppermint Twist" (1961). The group's most notable lineup is considered to be Joey Dee, David Brigati, Larry Vernieri (vocals), Carlton Lattimore (organ), Sam Taylor (guitar) and Willie Davis (drums). Jimi Hendrix and Joe Pesci played guitar with the group at different times in the 1960s.

== Early singles ==
With lead singer Rogers Freeman, Joey Dee and the Starliters' first single was "Lorraine," backed with "The Girl I Walk To School," in 1958, distributed by the company Little. That same year, Joey Dee recruited David Brigati for the team after meeting him during a gig at Garfield High School in New Jersey. David and Joey would subsequently share lead vocal honors for the Starliters, with Joey ultimately becoming the primary lead singer. Another early single for the group was "Face of an Angel," with David as lead vocal, released on Scepter Records; the flipside was "Shimmy Baby." An album entitled The Peppermint Twisters and credited to "Joey Dee and the Starlighters" was subsequently released by the company Scepter as well.

== The 1960s ==
In 1960, the Starliters were noticed by agent Don Davis while performing at a Lodi, New Jersey, nightclub called Oliveri's. The group was booked at an intimate venue on 45th Street in New York City called the Peppermint Lounge for what was supposed to be a one-time weekend gig. During their initial appearance at the nightclub, actress Merle Oberon and Prince Serge Oblinski were dancing much of the night there, which was reported the next morning by columnists Earl Wilson and Cholly Knickerbocker. The next night, it took barricades and mounted police to keep the crowds in line, which had backed to Broadway, and for several months thereafter, the craze continued at the Lounge. Celebrity visitors, such as Judy Garland, John Wayne, Jackie Kennedy, Nat "King" Cole, Shirley MacLaine, Tennessee Williams, Truman Capote, and Liberace, continued to make an appearance. Dee and company were such a sensation that they became the house band for the Peppermint Lounge for over a year. Dee wrote "Peppermint Twist," along with producer Henry Glover, as a tribute to the lounge and the song scored number one on the U.S. charts in early 1962. It sold over one million copies, and was awarded a gold disc. By this time the team had contracted with Roulette Records.

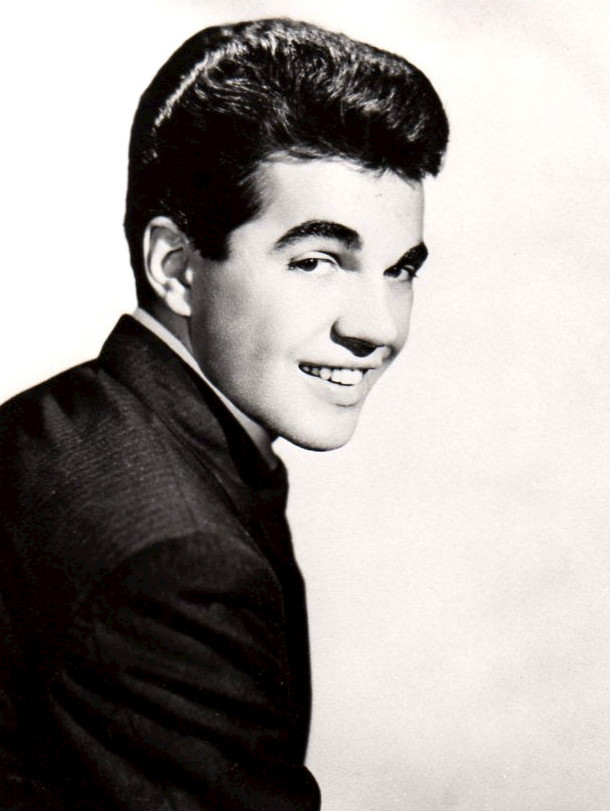
Dee in 1962

In 1961, Joey Dee and the Starliters filmed the movie Hey, Let's Twist, starring Jo Ann Campbell and Teddy Randazzo, for Paramount Pictures. Hey, Let's Twist was a fictional story of Joey Dee (Randazzo and Dino DiLuca played the parts of Joey's brother and father, respectively) and the Peppermint Lounge; its release capitalized on the current twist craze and made the once-obscure Lounge famous. The movie and soundtrack album did their part in making the Peppermint Lounge a world-famous venue. Successful singles spawned from Hey, Let's Twist were the title track and "Shout, Part I", which became the group's second-biggest selling record, reaching number six on the U.S. chart. It also sold a million copies, giving the group their second gold disc. Other albums released during this time were Doin' The Twist at the Peppermint Lounge, which was recorded live at the venue, and All The World's Twistin' With Joey Dee & the Starliters (1961).

In 1962, Joey Dee and the Starliters starred in their second motion picture, Two Tickets to Paris, along with Gary Crosby, Jeri Lynne Fraser and Kay Medford. One of the songs from this film, "What Kind Of Love Is This," written by Johnny Nash, was released in September of that year and scored Top Twenty. In December 1962, the original Starliters did their final recording session as a group, producing "Help Me Pick Up the Pieces," also composed by Nash, and "Baby, You're Driving Me Crazy," written by Joey Dee and Henry Glover. In 1963, Joey Dee recorded an album entitled Dance, Dance, Dance, with the Ronettes as his backup group. During spring of that year, Roulette released the track "Hot Pastrami with Mashed Potatoes", from the previously issued live album, as a two-part single; the record made the U.S. Top Forty. Roulette later released "Ya Ya" and "Fannie Mae" from the same album. Also in 1963, former Mersey Beat editor Bill Harry quotes in his Sleeve notes for the 2004 CD The Early Tapes of the Beatles that the group were the backing Band on the Tony Sheridan track "Ruby Baby", though this has not been verified by any members. The track has been widely reissued on various versions of the Beatles Hamburg recordings. During October and November 1963, the Starliters toured Europe, performing one extraordinary night in Stockholm with The Beatles (already the biggest band in Northern Europe) as their opening act. In 1964, Joey Dee toured with various Starliters, including future Young Rascals Gene Cornish, Felix Cavaliere, and David's brother, Eddie Brigati.

Jimi Hendrix and Joe Pesci played guitar with the group at different times in the 1960s.

== Later history ==
Dee continued to record and issue solo recordings from the mid-1960s to the mid-1970s, including a song he wrote with original Starliters David Brigati and Larry Vernieri entitled "How Can I Forget", which was released under the name Joey Dee and the New Starliters.

In 2001, the group was featured on a PBS special, Rock, Rhythm and Doo-Wop, and in 2005 they appeared on the Jerry Lewis telethon for muscular dystrophy.

As of 2009, Joey Dee and the Starliters consists of Dee sometimes performing with Bobby Valli (brother of Frankie Valli) and original Starliter David Brigati and at other times with the original Soul Survivors Charlie and Richie Ingui, with the three singers taking the lead and performing their own hits as well as covers. Joey's son Ronnie DiNicola often plays saxophone and sings backup vocals for his father.

Dee has been a long time resident of Pinellas County in Florida.

On September 19, 2010, a street corner was dedicated to the band in their home town of Passaic, NJ. The street signing took place on the corner of Washington Place and Columbia Ave.

In 2021, Joey Dee released his autobiography, entitled Peppermint Twist Chronicles: My True Story of Sex, Rock n’ Roll, Jimi Hendrix, Fighting Racism, and the Mob. Dee’s memoirs were co-written by J. Kevin Morris.

== Members ==
Name	Instruments	Born	Place of birth	Died
Joey Dee (b. Joseph DiNicola)	vocals and saxophone	June 11, 1937	Passaic, N.J.	
David Brigati	vocals	October 29, 1940	Garfield, N.J.	March 7, 2026
Larry Vernieri	vocals	October 9, 1941	Newark, N.J.	December 7, 1999
Carlton Lattimore	organ	1939	Passaic, N.J.	
Willie Davis	drums	1940	Passaic, N.J.	

== Discography ==
=== Albums ===
- Doin' the Twist at the Peppermint Lounge (Roulette, 1961, No. 2 US)
- Hey Let's Twist (Roulette, 1961, No. 18 US)
- All The World Is Twistin'! (Roulette, 1962)
- Two Tickets To Paris (Roulette, 1962)
- Back At The Peppermint Lounge (Roulette, 1962, No. 97 US)
- Hey Let's Twist!: The Best Of Joey Dee & The Starliters (Rhino, 1990)

=== Singles ===
Year	A-side/B-side Both sides from same album except where indicated	Label & number	Charts			Album
Year	A-side/B-side Both sides from same album except where indicated	Label & number	Billboard	Cashbox	CHUM	Album
1960	"Shimmy Baby" b/w "Face of an Angel"	Scepter 1210	-	-	-	The Peppermint Twisters
1961	"These Memories" b/w "(Bad) Bulldog"	Scepter 1225	-	-	-	The Peppermint Twisters
1961	"Peppermint Twist" – Part I b/w Part II	Roulette 4401	1	2	3	Doin' the Twist at the Peppermint Lounge
1962	"Hey, Let's Twist" / "Roly Poly"	Roulette 4408	20; 74	37; 100	-	Hey, Let's Twist! (Soundtrack)
1962	"Shout" Part I" b/w Part II	Roulette 4416	6	9	-	Doin' the Twist at the Peppermint Lounge
1962	"Everytime (I Think About You)" – Part One" b/w Part Two	Roulette 4431	105	80	-	Two Tickets to Paris (Soundtrack)
1962	"What Kind of Love Is This" b/w "Wing Ding" (from All the World Is Twistin'!)	Roulette 4438	18	17	26	Two Tickets to Paris (Soundtrack)
1962	"I Lost My Baby" b/w "Keep Your Mind on What You're Doin'"	Roulette 4456	61	61	-	Joey Dee
1963	"The Girl I Walk to School" b/w "Lorraine"	Bonus 7009	-	-	-	Non-album tracks
1963	"Baby, You're Driving Me Crazy" b/w "Help Me Pick Up the Pieces"	Roulette 4467	100	-	-	Non-album tracks
1963	"Hot Pastrami with Mashed Potatoes" – Part I b/w Part II	Roulette 4488	36	40	19	Non-album tracks
1963	"Dance, Dance, Dance" b/w "Let's Have a Party"	Roulette 4503	89	90	-	Dance, Dance, Dance
1963	"Ya Ya" b/w "Fanny Mae"	Roulette 4525	-	-	-	Doin' the Twist at the Peppermint Lounge
1963	"Getting Nearer" b/w "Down by the Riverside"	Roulette 4539	-	-	-	Non-album tracks
1965	"Cry a Little Sometime" b/w "Wing Ding" (from All the World Is Twistin'!)	Roulette 4617	-	-	-	Non-album tracks
1966	"Feel Good About It" – Part I b/w Part II	Jubilee 5532	-	-	-	Hitsville!
1966	"Dancing on the Beach" b/w "Good Little You"	Jubilee 5539	-	-	-	Non-album tracks
1966	"It's Got You" b/w "She's So Exceptional" (non-album track)	Jubilee 5554	-	-	-	Hitsville!
1967	"Can't Sit Down" b/w "Put Your Heart in It"	Jubilee 5566	-	-	-	Non-album tracks
1967	"How Can I Forget" b/w "How Can I Forget" (Instrumental)	Caneil 100	-	-	-	Non-album tracks
1970	"Roses and Candy Kisses" b/w "Roses and Candy Kisses"	Tonsil 0003 (promo only)	-	-	-	Non-album tracks
