= Peppermint Lounge =

Discotheque in New York City, New York, U.S.

Coordinates: 40°45′26″N 73°59′0″W

The Peppermint Lounge was a popular discotheque located at 128 West 45th Street in New York City that was open from 1958 to 1965, although a new one was opened in 1980. It was the launchpad for the global Twist craze in the early 1960s. Many claim The Peppermint Lounge was also where go-go dancing originated, although this claim is subject to dispute.

== Original Peppermint Lounge ==
The Peppermint Lounge opened in 1958 at 128 West 45th Street in Manhattan. It had a lengthy mahogany bar running along one side, many mirrors and a dance floor at the back, a capacity of just 178 people, and a gay clientele.

As the Twist craze hit in 1960–1961, celebrities swarmed into the Peppermint Lounge – Audrey Hepburn, Truman Capote, Marilyn Monroe, Judy Garland, Liberace, Noël Coward, Frank Sinatra, Norman Mailer, Annette Funicello, even the elusive Greta Garbo – to dance to the house band, Joey Dee and the Starliters. Jackie Kennedy was such an enthusiast that she arranged for a temporary "Peppermint Lounge" to be mounted in the White House. One such event even took place at a meeting of the austere Council of the Organization of American States. A sister club was opened in Miami Beach. The proprietor Ralph Saggese appeared as a contestant on What's My Line? in 1961. Orlando Grippo was another owner with Saggese, running the spot.

During 1961, Paramount Pictures filmed the movie Hey, Let's Twist!, a fictional story of Dee and the Peppermint Lounge starring Jo Ann Campbell and Teddy Randazzo. At the end of the year, the Starliters' "Peppermint Twist" became a hit, spending three weeks at No. 1 in January 1962. This brought the club wide recognition, reinforced later in the year by Sam Cooke's "Twistin' the Night Away" which, while not mentioning the club by name, was about "a place/Somewhere up a New York way/Where the people are so gay". The movie and soundtrack album also did their part in making the Peppermint Lounge a world-famous venue. Successful singles spawned from Hey, Let's Twist! were the title track and "Shout – Part I". Other albums released during this time were Doin' the Twist at the Peppermint Lounge, which was recorded live at the venue, and All the World's Twistin' with Joey Dee & the Starliters.

The Beatles were filmed visiting the club during their first U.S. visit in 1964.

Artists who performed at the Peppermint Lounge include the Beach Boys, the Ronettes (who made their professional debut here in 1961), the Crystals, the Isley Brothers, Chubby Checker, the Younger Brothers, Liza Minnelli, the Jackson 5, and the Four Seasons. In the mid‑1960s, the house band was the Wild Ones. The Denos, a traveling roadhouse band, were another featured act. Members of the Starliters later went on to form the Young Rascals.

Both the NYC and Miami clubs were sold in 1965. The New York club was run by Genovese crime family captain Matty "The Horse" Ianniello, who managed numerous gay bars and strip clubs in Manhattan. It closed when it lost its liquor license on December 28, 1965.

== Hollywood ==
The 128 West 45th Street venue reopened as a gay bar called "Hollywood", most notable for the 1970s DJ residency of Richie Kaczor, who went on to great success at Studio 54.

== G. G. Barnum's Room ==
The 45th Street space reopened as G. G. Barnum's Room on July 20, 1978, and continued until November 1980. Male go-go dancers performed on trapezes over a net above the dance floor. G. G. Barnum's Room was a popular meeting place for transsexuals, drag queens and homosexuals. The "G.G." was a reference to the Ianniello-owned Gilded Grape located at 719 8th Avenue, a notorious gay bar which operated from the early 1970s until 1977.

== Second Peppermint Lounge ==
In November 1980, after G. G. Barnum's closed, the Peppermint Lounge name was revived for a new music night club sparked by Rudolf Pieper and Jim Fouratt and run by Frank Roccio and Tom Goodkind. The DJ was David Azarc. The club featured top international music acts from both alternative rock and the burgeoning hip hop scenes. Some of the regular featured acts were the Cramps, X, the Raybeats, the Go-Gos, Duran Duran, Marshall Crenshaw, Grandmaster Flash and the Furious Five, Big Country, Billy Idol, Afrika Bambaataa, the Bangles, the Waitresses and Joan Jett. VIP guests such as Mick Jagger and David Bowie added to the club's cachet. The Birthday Party and New Order also played there. In March 1981, Yoko Ono visited the club in one of her first public appearances after the death of John Lennon, personally delivering a copy of their last single, "Walking on Thin Ice".

In 1982, the Peppermint Lounge moved downtown to 100 5th Avenue. It closed in 1985. The building at 128 West 45th Street was torn down in the mid-1980s.

== Racketeering case ==
In 1986, Judge Edward Weinfeld sentenced Ianniello to six years in prison on a racketeering charge that involved skimming over $2 million from bars and restaurants (including Umberto's Clam House, the Peppermint Lounge and a topless bar called the Mardi Gras, all in Manhattan) secretly owned by Ianniello, his business partner Benjamin Cohen and seven associates.
