= New Horizons (Connie Smith album) =

Studio album by Connie Smith
- Released: March 1978
- Recorded: September 1977 – February 1978
- Studios: Columbia (Nashville, Tennessee)
- Genre: Country pop
- Label: Monument
- Producer: Ray Baker

Connie Smith chronology
Pure Connie Smith (1977)	New Horizons (1978)	The Best of Connie Smith (1989)

Singles from New Horizons
- 1. "I Just Want to Be Your Everything" Released: September 1977; 2. "Lovin' You Baby" Released: February 1978; 3. "There'll Never Be Another for Me" Released: June 1978

New Horizons is the thirtieth solo studio album by American country singer Connie Smith. It was released in March 1978 and contained ten tracks. She had recently switched to Monument after several years with Columbia Records. The album was cut in a country pop production style that Smith felt pressured into. Yet three singles made the American country songs chart between 1977 and 1978, including the top 20 "I Just Want to Be Your Everything".

== Background, recording and content ==
Connie Smith has 18 top ten Billboard country singles at the RCA Victor label before moving to Columbia Records in the 1970s. At Columbia, only two of her singles reached the country top ten, while a majority reached the top 20. Smith left Columbia's roster in 1977, theorizing that her music lacked the promotion that more popular Columbia acts received like George Jones or Tammy Wynette. Smith signed with Monument Records in 1977, which was owned by Fred Foster. According to Smith, Foster told her that he wanted to craft her into "another Roy Orbison."

New Horizons was the second studio project Smith recorded for the Monument label. It was recorded at the Columbia Studios, located in Nashville, Tennessee. Sessions were held between September 1977 and February 1978. It was produced by Ray Baker. Baker had been serving as Smith's producer since 1973 and he moved forward with her to Monument. The material for New Horizons was cut in a country pop style, that was pressured into Smith by the label. Baker himself later remarked to biographer Barry Mazor that he also disliked the production of the album. A total of ten tracks comprised New Horizons. It featured several covers of pop singles. Among them was Andy Gibb's "I Just Want to Be Your Everything", Gogi Grant's "The Wayward Wind", Debby Boone's "You Light Up My Life" and James Taylor's "Your Smiling Face". Original material penned by Dallas Frazier, Steve Collum and Dewayne Ordender was also part of the project.

== Release, singles and reception ==
New Horizons was released in March 1978 on Monument Records. It was the thirty second studio album of Smith's career. It was distributed as both a vinyl LP and a cassette, containing five songs on each side of the discs. Both had identical track listings. Three singles were part of the album. The first released single was Smith's cover of "I Just Want to Be Your Everything", which Monument issued in September 1977. It was the most commercially successful single off the album and a top 20 song on the Billboard country songs chart, climbing to number 14 in January 1978. Its next single was "Lovin' You Baby", issued by Monument in February 1978. The single became Smith's last top 40 single on the Billboard country chart, peaking at number 34.

One final single was issued from the project. In June 1978, "They'll Never Be Another For Me" was issued by Monument and peaked at number 68 on the Billboard country chart. Although no official review was given of New Horizons, six of its tracks later appeared on Smith's 1993 compilation, Greatest Hits on Monument. Critic, Stephen Thomas Erlewine found "the songs simply aren't good enough to make this interesting to anybody outside of hardcore fans of soft soft pop". Erlewine also explained why he thought the songs were not more successful: "This is commercial music that doesn't really work. It has a state-of-the-art production that dates instantly, walks the line between crossover pop and country-pop rather clumsly, and lacks good material."

== Track listing ==
Side one
No.	Title	Writer(s)	Length
1.	"I Just Want to Be Your Everything"	Barry Gibb	3:17
2.	"All of a Sudden"	Steve Collom	2:35
3.	"There'll Never Be Another for Me"	John Colley; Dan Seals; Parker McGee	2:44
4.	"Too Good to Be True"	Dallas Frazier	2:17
5.	"The Wayward Wind"	Stanley Lebowsky; Herb Newman	2:41

Side one
No.	Title	Writer(s)	Length
1.	"Your Smiling Face"	James Taylor	2:09
2.	"Lovin' You Baby"	Jo Ann Campbell Seals; Troy Seals	2:34
3.	"You Light Up My Life"	Joe Brooks	3:29
4.	"Loving You Has Sure Been Good to Me"	Dallas Frazier; Earl Montgomery	2:34
5.	"It's Not Easy to Say Goodbye"	Dewayne Orender	2:40

== Personnel ==
All credits are adapted from the liner notes of New Horizons.

Musical and technical personnel

- Ray Baker — producer
- Connie Smith — lead vocals
- Chip Young, Ray Edenton, Reggie Young, Grady Martin, John Christopher, Leo Jackson, Phil Baugh, Billy Williams — guitar
- Bob Moore, Tommy Allsup — bass
- Jerry Smith, Shane Keister, Thomas B. Keels — keyboards
- Kenny Malone, Jerry Carrigan — drums
- Lloyd Green — steel guitar
- Sheldon Kurland, Byron T. Bach, George Binkley III, Marvin D. Chantry, Roy Christensen, Carl Gorodetzky, Lennie Haight, Wilfred Lehman, John A. Moore, Steven M. Smith, Gary Vanosdale, Pamela Vanosdale — strings
- Delores Edgin, Hurshel Wiginton, Joseph Babcok, Wenelleyn Suits — background vocals

== Release history ==
Region	Date	Format	Label	Ref.
North America	November 1977	Vinyl; cassette	Monument Records	
