= Janice Whitby =

American actress

- Occupations: Actress; Graphic Designer
- Years active: 1970–present
- Known for: The Bionic Woman; Golddigger

Janice Whitby is a Canadian-born American film and television actress. Her most notable roles includes her debut as a Golddigger, a singing and dancing troupe of young women on The Dean Martin Show. However, she is probably best known for her portrayal of the fembot Katy in the 1970s television series The Bionic Woman.

== Career ==
Whitby made her television debut when she joined "The Golddiggers", an assembled singing and dance troupe that performed regularly on "The Dean Martin Show". She remained with the troupe when they spun off into their own television show, "Chevrolet Presents the Golddiggers". Whitby then departed the Golddiggers and joined the final season of Rowan & Martin's "Laugh-In" as one of the Beautiful Downtown Beauties.

After "Laugh-In" Whitby landed guest roles on several hit TV series including Baretta, Emergency! and Cannon. However, her biggest and possibly most memorable TV role was guest starring on "The Six Million Dollar Man" and The Bionic Woman three part epic crossover entitled "Kill Oscar". She played the android assailant, Katy, Doctor Franklin's (John Houseman) fembot assistant and operative. The fembot role earned Whitby ongoing cult status fame among science fiction fans.

== Filmography ==
=== Films ===
Year	Title	Role	Notes
1974	Mame	Dance troupe	
1974	Blazing Saddles	Studio tour guide	Uncredited
1977	The Happy Hooker Goes to Washington	Tennis pro	
1981	Sophisticated Gents	Gail Peabody	Uncredited

=== TV series ===
Year(s)	Title	Role	Seasons	Notes
1970–1971	The Dean Martin Show	Golddigger	1	
1971–1972	Chevrolet Presents The Golddiggers	Golddigger	1	
1973–1974	Laugh-in	as one of the Beautiful Downtown Beauties	1	

=== TV appearances ===
Year	Title	Role	Episode titles	Notes
1974	Emergency!	Partying Actress	"The Bash"	Season 4, episode 14
1975	Cannon	Nancy Harris	"The Wrong Medicine"	Season 5, episode 3
1976	The Bionic Woman	Fembot #1/Katy	"Kill Oscar"	Season 2, episode 5
1976	The Six Million Dollar Man	Fembot #1/Katy	"Kill Oscar (Part 2)"	Season 4, episode 6
1976	The Bionic Woman	Fembot #1/Katy	"Kill Oscar (Part 3)"	Season 2, episode 6
1977	The Bionic Woman	Fembot #1/Katy	"Fembots in Las Vegas "	Season 3, episode 3 (archive footage)

== Additional sources ==
- http://www.bionicwomanfiles.com
- http://www.supermegafest.com/
