= Two Tickets to Paris =

1962 film by Greg Garrison

- Directed by: Greg Garrison
- Written by: Hal Hackaday
- Based on: an original story by Hackaday
- Produced by: Harry Romm
- Starring: Joey Dee; Gary Crosby; Kay Medford
- Cinematography: William O. Steiner
- Edited by: Ralph Rosenblum
- Music by: Les Baxter
- Production company: Harry Romm Productions
- Distributed by: Columbia Pictures
- Release date: November 28, 1962
- Running time: 90 minutes
- Country: United States
- Language: English

Two Tickets to Paris is a 1962 American musical comedy film directed by Greg Garrison and starring Joey Dee and the Starliters, Gary Crosby and Kay Medford.

== Plot ==
An engaged couple, Joey and Piper, travel to Paris where Joey has a gig performing.

== Cast ==
- Joey Dee as Joey Dee
- Gary Crosby as Gary
- Kay Medford as Aggie
- Jeri Lynne Fraser as Piper
- Lisa James as Coco
- Charles Nelson Reilly as Claypoole
- Richard Dickens as Tony
- Nina Paige as Dumb blonde
- Sal Lombardo as Marmaduke
- Jeri Archer as Mrs. Patten
- Michele Moinot as Le Claire
- Jay Burton as Charles

== Production ==
The film was made independently by Harry Romm, who had produced Hey, Let's Twist (1961). He used the same director of that film, Greg Garrison, and cast Joey Dee, who was known for the Peppermint Twist. It was originally going to be called Viva La Twist but this was changed.

The cast included Gary Crosby who had been in many film musicals such as Mardi Gras, and Kay Medford, who had been in Bye Bye Birdie on stage. The film was shot in May 1962 at a studio in New York, the Production Center on 221 West Street, with some filming about a liner and the RoundTable nightclub. Filming finished by 8 June.

The Hollywood studio Columbia Pictures agreed to distribute the film.

== Reception ==
The New York Times called the film "pitiful". The Monthly Film Bulletin criticised the "meagre and labouriously [sic] contrived story... the dialogue is unfunny."

A soundtrack album was released.
