= Jeri Lynne Fraser =

American singer, actress (b. 1946)

- Born: June 6, 1946 (age 80); Manchester, Connecticut
- Other names: Jerri Lynn, Jery Lynn Frazer
- Occupations: Actress, singer
- Years active: 1957–present
- Notable work: Two Tickets to Paris

Jeri Lynne Fraser (born June 6, 1946) is an American singer and actress. She is best known for her starring role in the 1962 film Two Tickets to Paris, directed by Greg Garrison.

== Early life ==
Born in Manchester, Connecticut, Fraser started her singing career as a child. Gene Pitney, a future member of the Rock and Roll Hall of Fame, lived in a nearby town and was a childhood friend.

== Career ==
At the age of 12, after winning Ted Mack's The Original Amateur Hour three times, Fraser played Madison Square Garden.

She signed a record contract with Bigtop Records when she was 13, and released her first single in 1959 as Jeri Lynn. Her next single on Columbia records, "Poor Begonia (Caught Pneumonia)", was an answer to the popular "Itsy Bitsy Teenie Weenie Yellow Polkadot Bikini".

In 1962 she moved with her family to New York City, and as a 16-year-old, landed a starring role in the 1962 film Two Tickets to Paris, playing the female lead opposite Joey Dee.

Fraser soon moved to Las Vegas where, still a teenager, she spent a year as a headline act. In 1964, Fraser filmed the TV movie Mike and the Mermaid, in the title role as the mermaid; the movie did not air until January 5, 1968. She appeared in the 1966 film Lord Love a Duck, and also made television appearances on episodes of Bewitched and Occasional Wife.

When she was 20, Fraser started to tour with the Roger Williams Orchestra. At the age of 22, declining Williams' offer to join him on a tour of Asia, she chose to retire from performing for several years.

In 2010, Fraser released her first album, Lost in the Feeling.

== Personal life ==
As of April 2008, Fraser was living in Lady Lake, Florida.

== Discography ==
- "If" / "Now I'm of Age" (as Jeri Lynn) (Big Top 45–3015, 1959)
- "Poor Begonia (Caught Pneumonia)" / "Catch Me" (Columbia 41790, 1960)
- "Lessons in Love" / "Give Me Your Arm, Papa" ( Columbia 42032, 1960)
- "Poor Joe" / "Take It Easy Baby" (Columbia 42234, 1961)
- "Teenage Vamp" from the soundtrack album Two Tickets to Paris (Roulette Records R 25182, 1962)
- "Hush, Harvey, Hush" / "You Spoiled Me" (ABC Paramount 10395, 1963)
- "Are You a Guy With a Line" / "Movie Queen" (ABC Paramount 10438, 1963)
- "This Is the Night" (as Jery Lynn Frazer) on the compilation album Rebels Without a Cause (Canetoad Records – CDI-015, 2007)
- Lost in the Feeling (album) (JLFproductions, 2010)
- Just Use Your Love (album) (CD Baby, 2012)

== Filmography ==
- Two Tickets to Paris (female lead opposite Joey Dee) (1962)
- Lord Love a Duck (1966)
- Occasional Wife: "Occasional Trouble" – Season 1 Episode 2 (Aired September 20, 1966)
- Occasional Wife: "That's How They Got Capone" – Season 1 Episode 12 (Aired Dec 6, 1966)
- Bewitched: "Toys in Babeland" – Season 4 Episode 2 (as Girl Doll) (Aired Sep 14, 1967
- Mike and the Mermaid (as the Mermaid), (Aired ABC, January 5, 1968)
