= The Three Stooges (2000 film) =

2000 biopic about the Three Stooges

- Film poster
- Genre: Biography; Comedy drama
- Based on: From Amalgamated Morons to American Icons: The Three Stooges by Michael Fleming
- Teleplay by: Kirk Ellis; Janet Roach
- Story by: Janet Roach
- Directed by: James Frawley
- Starring: Paul Ben-Victor; Evan Handler; John Kassir; Michael Chiklis
- Music by: Patrick Williams
- Country of origin: United States
- Original language: English

Production
- Executive producers: Mel Gibson; Bruce Davey; Craig Zadan; Neil Meron; Scott Kroopf; Tom Engelman; Earl M. Benjamin; Robert N. Benjamin
- Producers: Jim Lemley; Tim White
- Cinematography: Robert Draper
- Editor: Scott Vickrey
- Running time: 88 minutes
- Production companies: Icon Productions; Storyline Entertainment; Interscope Communications; Comedy III Productions; Columbia TriStar Television

Original release
- Network: ABC
- Release: April 24, 2000

The Three Stooges is an American biographical comedy drama television film about the slapstick comedy team The Three Stooges directed by James Frawley. The film was entirely shot in Sydney, Australia. It was broadcast on ABC on April 24, 2000. The film was released on DVD by Sony Pictures Home Entertainment in 2012 as part of the Sony Pictures Choice Collection, while it was released on Blu-ray as part of The Three Stooges Collection on August 13, 2024.

== Plot ==
The film is a biography of the Three Stooges following their careers and rise to fame as shown through the eyes of their leader, Moe Howard. This movie breaks away from the traditionally humorous Three Stooges format and has more of a serious undertone throughout.

The film opens in 1959 with an aging Moe Howard running errands for his former agent Harry Romm on the studio lot at Columbia Pictures. A young television executive working for Screen Gems from Boston has traveled to L.A. to convince Moe and the Stooges to come back East and perform their act live in theatres and on television, but Moe is not interested. The film then flashes back to 1925, when comedian Ted Healy hires the Howard brothers for his vaudeville act.

Healy offers to add Larry Fine to the act if he drops the fiddle playing from his routine. Healy pockets most of the money, which doesn't sit well with the others. The three men decide on a trademark of each having distinct hairstyles: Moe with a bowl cut, Larry with curly frizzy hair and Curly Howard (real name Jerome, also called “Babe” by his brothers) with a crew cut. (Shemp Howard would part his hair right down the middle.)

Fox Film Corporation (which is referred to as 20th Century Fox, despite the studio not being founded until 1935) produces Soup to Nuts with Healy and the Three Stooges, along with Shemp Howard, and then offers Moe a seven-year contract - without Healy. Healy interferes with the deal until Harry Cohn signs The Three Stooges to Columbia in 1934. Cohn sends the act to the short films department. Moe and Larry want to do feature films, but Cohn believes that a farce comedy team should only do shorts. The group completes 190 two-reel shorts from 1934 to 1957, released until 1959. Comical sound effects are added to accent physical acts such as a slap in the face, a punch in the stomach, a pull on the nose and a hammer to the head. Curly becomes famous for his high voice and other vocal sound riffs. The movie recreates many famous iconic Stooges scenes.

The biography also shows the personal dynamics of the comedy team. The wives of the players also have a role throughout the film. Moe assumes the role of leader, but to the point that Babe feels bullied. Babe says he has no problem with Moe picking on “Curly” for the act, but off stage they are still a family. Meanwhile, Larry frequently loses money as a result of his gambling.

Healy, having parted with the team earlier in a bitter way, reappears later to shake hands with the group and announce that he is going to be a father. He dies later that night after a fight in his hotel at the age of 41. Babe is injured and humiliated in a hotel lobby when some young adult fans recognize him as Curly and deliver a real poke to his eyes and a punch to his face.

In 1946, Babe has a debilitating stroke while filming a scene. He is replaced by Shemp in the two-reel shorts until their respective deaths in 1952 and 1955. Shemp’s vacant role is taken over by Joe Besser for 1956 and 1957. Joe DeRita joins the troupe as “Curly Joe” in 1958. That same year, Moe & Larry report to work on the studio lot but are denied entry after learning that Harry Cohn has died of a heart attack and the short film department has been shut down.

Returning to 1959, the group discusses the proposal for the live theater show in Boston and eventually agree. To their surprise, they find new success with younger viewers through television and become one of the highest paid comedy acts in the country.

== Cast ==
- Paul Ben-Victor as Moe Howard
  - Peter Scarf as Moe at age 15
- Evan Handler as Larry Fine
- Michael Chiklis as Curly Howard
  - Shaun Loseby as Curly at age 9
- John Kassir as Shemp Howard
  - Douglas Blaikie as Shemp at age 17
- Marton Csokas as Ted Healy
- Laurence Coy as Joe Besser
- Peter Callahan as Joe DeRita
- Rachael Blake as Helen Howard, Moe's wife
- Anna-Lise Phillips as Mabel Fine, Larry's wife
- Jeanette Cronin as Gertrude Howard, Shemp's wife
- Harry Weiss as Solomon Horwitz, the Howards' father
- Buster Skeggs as Jenny Horowitz, the Howards' mother
- Zoe Coyle as Betty Healy, Ted Healy's wife
- Helen Dallimore as Elaine Ackerman, Curly's girlfriend
- Joel Edgerton as Tom Cosgrove, fictional television executive
- Linal Haft as Harry Cohn
- Brandon Burke as Harry Romm
- Lewis Fitz-Gerald as Jules White
- Geoff Bartlett as Del Lord
- Gary Baxter as Felix Adler
- Gunther Berghofer as Clyde Bruckman
- Chris Burke as Joe Henrie
- Phillip Hinton as Edward LeSaint (Judge in Disorder in the Court)
- Peter Whitford as Dell Henderson (Administrator in Men in Black)
- David Whitford as James C. Morton (Bailiff in Disorder in the Court)
- Martin Pashley as Bud Jamison (Southern Colonel in Uncivil Warriors)
- David Downer as Winfield Sheehan
- David Baldwin as Louis B. Mayer
- Len Kaserman as Jack L. Warner
- John Batchelor as Curly Wannabee

== Re-shot shorts ==
Among the shorts that were re-shot for the film are the following:

- Men in Black (1934)
- Uncivil Warriors (1935)
- Ants in the Pantry (1936)
- Disorder in the Court (1936)
- You Nazty Spy! (1940)
- Dutiful But Dumb (1941)
- They Stooge to Conga (1943)
- Half-Wits Holiday (1947)
- Fright Night (1947)
- Pies and Guys (1958)

== Reception ==
Steven Oxman of Variety wrote in a review that in the film, who the Three Stooges were and why they were funny was lost in its exposition. He explained that "the film does cover a lot for a two-hour telepic. But it also chooses information over insight, exegesis over drama, never making a case along the way for what made the Stooges such a lasting phenomenon. The final dish in this crowded kitchen has lots of quality ingredients, but almost no flavor."
