= Nipsey Russell =

American entertainer (1918–2005)

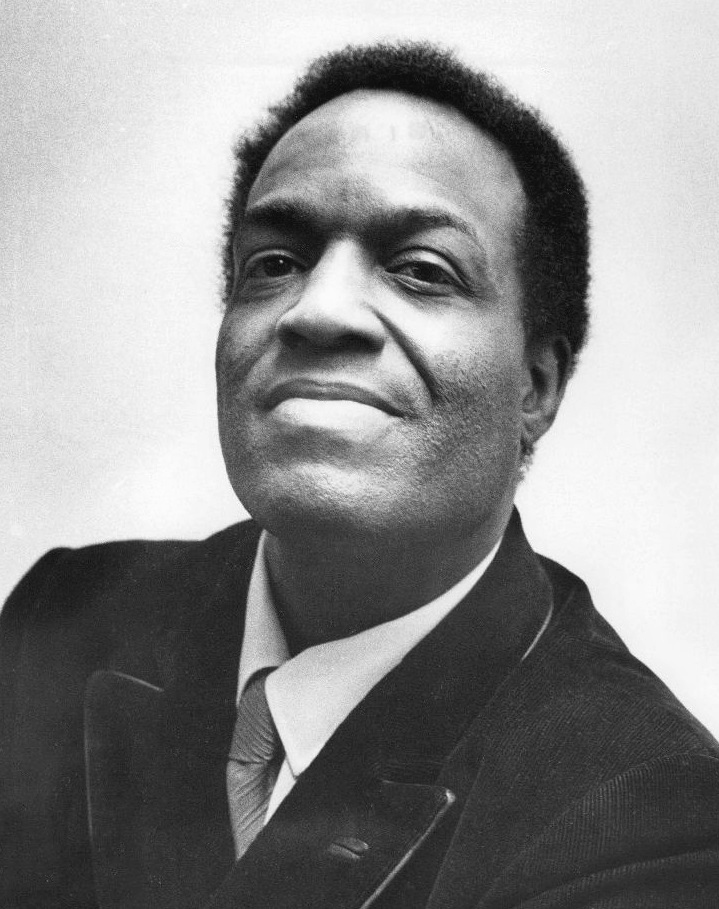
- Russell in 1971
- Born: Julius Russell; September 15, 1918; Atlanta, Georgia, US
- Died: October 2, 2005 (aged 87); New York City, US
- Occupations: Comedian; poet; actor; dancer
- Years active: 1952–2005

Julius "Nipsey" Russell (September 15, 1918 – October 2, 2005) was an American entertainer best known for his appearances as a panelist on game shows from the 1960s through the 1990s, including Match Game, Password, Hollywood Squares, To Tell the Truth, and Pyramid. His appearances were often distinguished by short, humorous poems he recited during the broadcast, which led to his nickname "the poet laureate of television". He had one of the leading roles in the film version of The Wiz as the Tin Man. He was a frequent guest on the Dean Martin Celebrity Roast series and often appeared on Late Night with Conan O'Brien during the program's early years.

== Early life ==
Russell was born in Atlanta. His birthdate is unclear; according to one report his birth certificate was lost. At the time of his 2005 death, friends said he was 80, and that was the age reported in his obituaries. That implies a birth year of 1924 or 1925; the New York Times obituary gave his birthdate as October 13, 1924. Federal records suggest that he was born in 1918: Census documents record a Julius Russell in Atlanta aged 1 year 4 months in 1920, consistent with a birthdate in late 1918. The Social Security Death Index lists his birthdate as September 15, 1918.

Russell acquired the nickname "Nipsey" from his mother, who liked the way it sounded. He attended Booker T. Washington High School in Atlanta, then moved to Cincinnati to live with an aunt during his senior year so that he could establish residency to attend the University of Cincinnati tuition-free. He attended the University of Cincinnati for one semester in 1936, which is also consistent with a birthdate of 1918, as he would have been 18 and not merely 11 or 12, as he would have been if he had been born in 1924 or 1925. He served as a medic in the United States Army during World War II, enlisting as a private on June 27, 1941, and returning from Europe in 1945 as a second lieutenant.

He got his start as a comedian in the 1940s as a carhop at the Atlanta drive-in The Varsity, where he increased the tips he earned by making customers laugh. He was discovered after he began performing in nightclubs in the 1950s. He subsequently made many "party albums", which were essentially compilations of his stand-up routines.

== Early career ==
In 1952, Russell joined with film comedian Mantan Moreland for a stage act, replacing Ben Carter as Moreland's dapper straight man. One of their bits was an old routine that Moreland and Carter had performed in vaudeville and in Charlie Chan films. In the "interruption routine" (or "incomplete sentences") Moreland would engage Russell in conversation, only to be interrupted by Russell, who in turn was interrupted by Moreland:

Moreland: Guess who I saw? I saw old—
Russell: Is he back again? I thought he was—
Moreland: He was, but he got out.
Russell: Is that so?
Moreland: Yeah, he was over—
Russell: Is that so?

Soon, the entire conversation was conducted in incomplete sentences, with each man anticipating or contradicting the other. Their act can be seen in two all-Black-cast compilation films, Rhythm and Blues Review and Rock and Roll Revue; another variation of the "interruption routine", performed by Tommy Davidson and Savion Glover, was featured in Spike Lee's 2000 film Bamboozled.

A September 1957 appearance on The Ed Sullivan Show led to several guest spots with Jack Paar on The Tonight Show and in 1961 a supporting role as a New York policeman, "Andy" Anderson, in the sitcom Car 54, Where Are You? Russell returned to the role in the feature film version of Car 54, Where Are You? (filmed in 1990, released in 1994), with "Anderson" now serving as the precinct captain.

In 1965, Russell became a co-host of ABC's Nightlife. In 1970, he was a co-star on the ABC sitcom Barefoot in the Park. From 1973 through 1976, he appeared regularly on The Dean Martin Show and The Dean Martin Comedy World. In 1977, he appeared as an informant in an episode titled "Guns" on the TV series Police Woman. In 1978, he played the Tin Man in the film version of The Wiz alongside Diana Ross and Michael Jackson. Scattered appearances on television series followed, as well as occasional guest-host stints on The Tonight Show during the Johnny Carson era. Russell also appeared frequently in Las Vegas, including a series of appearances with Sergio Franchi at the Frontier Hotel in 1978 and 1979, and with Franchi in 1979 at the Sands Hotel Copa Room. He performed at Kutsher's Country Club in Monticello, New York, on January 1, 1977.

== Game shows ==
Russell became the first Black performer to become a regular panelist on a daily network game show when he joined ABC's Missing Links in 1964. In 1971, he started as a featured panelist on To Tell the Truth, which led to his being hired for The Match Game when Goodson-Todman Productions revived it two years later. He also served as panelist in 1968 on the syndicated version of What's My Line? Producer Bob Stewart featured him regularly as a panelist on Pyramid throughout its 1970s and 1980s runs. He hosted two revivals of Jack Barry and Dan Enright's Juvenile Jury for BET from 1983 to 1984, then again for syndication from 1989 to 1991. In 1983, Russell hosted a pilot game show on CBS called Star Words. Three pilots were recorded in June of that year but the show was not picked up. In 1985, he hosted the short-lived NBC game show Your Number's Up, which was produced by Sande Stewart.

Russell's specialty on game shows was delivering short, humorous poems. He was a regular panelist on a 1970s ABC show, Rhyme and Reason, built around his poetic talents. In 1979, he told Jet magazine, “I knew two poems and one day, on a show called Missing Links (Ed McMahon was the host), I did one poem and everybody applauded. The next day I did the other one I knew. On the third morning, Ed said, ‘And now Nipsey’s poem.’ I didn't really know any more poems, but I realized that this was a winning gimmick – that people liked this. So I went home to see if I could create them and found that I could. And that's how I started. I actually stumbled into it on the air.”

== Later career and death ==
In 1986, Russell played a supporting role in the film Wildcats which starred Goldie Hawn.

During the 1990s, Russell gained popularity with a new generation of television viewers as a regular on Late Night with Conan O'Brien. Russell often appeared during comedy sketches between scheduled guests and delivered his trademark rhymes.

Russell's final TV appearance was as a panelist on a game show–themed week on the final season of the Tom Bergeron version of Hollywood Squares in 2003.

Russell died on October 2, 2005, aged 87, at the Lenox Hill Hospital in New York City, from cancer. He was cremated and his ashes were scattered in the Atlantic Ocean.
