= Kay Armen =

American popular singer (1915–2011)

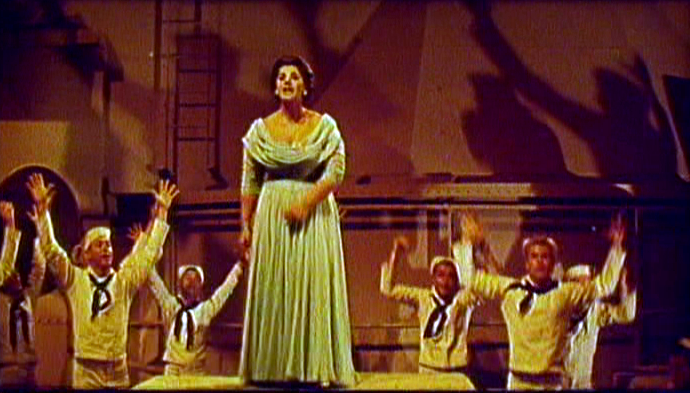
- Armen (center) in film Hit the Deck (1955)

Background information
- Born: Armenuhi Manoogian; November 2, 1915; Chicago, Illinois, U.S.
- Origin: American Armenian
- Died: October 3, 2011 (aged 95) New York City, New York, U.S.
- Occupation: singer

Armenuhi Manoogian (Armenian: Արմենուհի Մանուկեան); November 2, 1915 – October 3, 2011), better known by her stage name Kay Armen, was an American-Armenian singer popular during the 1940s and 1950s. Her career in show business spanned almost six decades; she worked on stage and in radio, television, and film. She wrote multiple songs, performed in nightclubs and recorded many records.

== Radio ==
Armen was born in Chicago, Illinois. Her father, Robert Manoogian, Sr., was a professional wrestler billed as Bob Monograph. She first appeared on radio at WSM in Nashville, Tennessee, performing on 12 programs per week. In 1947, she had her own weekly 15-minute program, titled Kay Armen-Songs, on NBC-Blue.

== Television and Film ==
She appeared in a number of roles, notably in the 1959 NBC sitcom Love and Marriage and on screen in the 1955 Metro-Goldwyn-Mayer musical Hit the Deck and the 1961 film Hey, Let's Twist!. She was also a songwriter with compositions, including "Be Good to Yourself", "My Love and I" and "It’s a Sin to Cry Over You".

== Personal life ==
Robert Manoogian, Jr. (January 4, 1918 – April 3, 2002), her younger brother, was an American professional wrestler who was best known for his work with National Wrestling Alliance in the 1940s as Bobby Managoff.

Kay Armen died in 2011 in New York City at the age of 95.

== Filmography ==
- 1955: Hit the Deck as Mrs. Ottavio Ferrari
- 1959-1960: Love and Marriage as Sophie (TV series, 18 episodes)
- 1961: Hey, Let's Twist! as Angie
- 1980: Jimmy B. & André as Mama Butsicaris (TV movie)
- 1981: Paternity as Claudia Feinstein
