= Lovin' You Baby (Connie Smith song) =

Single by Connie Smith

from the album New Horizons
- B-side: "All of a Sudden"
- Released: February 1978
- Recorded: January 1978
- Studio: Columbia (Nashville, Tennessee)
- Genre: Country; country pop
- Length: 2:34
- Label: Monument
- Songwriters: Troy Seals; Jo Ann Campbell Seals
- Producer: Ray Baker

Connie Smith singles chronology
"I Just Want to Be Your Everything" (1977)	"Lovin' You Baby" (1978)	"They'll Never Be Another for Me/Smooth Sailin'" (1978)

"Lovin' You Baby" is a song by American country music singer Connie Smith. It was composed by Troy Seals and Jo Ann Campbell Seals and was released as a single in 1978 via Monument Records. The song became a top 40 hit single on the American country chart that year and was later released on 1978 album, New Horizons.

== Background, content and chart performance ==
Connie Smith had a series of major hits for RCA Victor Records in the late 1960s and early 1970s. However, Smith left the label in 1973 and signed with Columbia Records, which she recorded for until signing with Monument Records. Under the production of Ray Baker, she recorded several single releases for Monument in the late 1970s, including "Lovin' You Baby". The track was composed by Troy Seals and Jo Ann Campbell Seals. The song was recorded in January 1978 at the Columbia Studio, located in Nashville, Tennessee. With Baker serving as producer, Smith cut an additional three tracks during the same session.

"Lovin' You Baby" was issued as a single on Monument Records in February 1978. It was backed on the flip side by "All of a Sudden," on a vinyl-issued single. The song spent ten weeks on the Billboard Hot Country Songs chart and peaked at number 34 in November 1975. It was Smith's final single in her career to reach a peak position in the country top 40. It was later issued on Smith's 1978 album titled New Horizons.

== Track listing ==
7" vinyl single

- "Lovin' You Baby" – 2:34
- "All of a Sudden" – 2:35

== Charts ==
Chart (1978)	Peak position
US Hot Country Songs (Billboard)	34
