= Foster Brooks =

American actor and comedian

- Born: Foster Murrell Brooks; May 11, 1912; Louisville, Kentucky, U.S.
- Died: December 20, 2001 (aged 89); Encino, Los Angeles, California, U.S.
- Occupations: Actor; comedian; singer
- Years active: 1952–1996
- Spouses: Loretta Brooks (m. 1933; div. 1950); Teri Brooks (m. 1950–2001)
- Children: 6

Foster Murrell Brooks (May 11, 1912 – December 20, 2001) was an American actor and comedian best known for his portrayal of a lovable drunk in nightclub performances and television programs.

== Early life ==
Brooks was born in Louisville, Kentucky, on May 11, 1912, to Edna (née Megowan) and Pleasant M. Brooks. He had seven brothers. His career started in radio, notably with station WHAS in Louisville. He was a staff announcer, and his deep baritone voice was also well-suited for singing. Brooks gained fame for his reporting of the Ohio River flood of 1937, where he was featured on emergency broadcasts by WHAS and also WSM from Nashville, Tennessee. In 1952, Brooks appeared on local TV in a short-lived spoof of Gene Autry and his "Singing Cowboys".

He later worked in local broadcasting as a radio and TV personality at WHAM in Rochester, New York, and at WGR & WKBW in Buffalo, where he hosted "The Musical Clock" and "Million Dollar Ballroom". In Buffalo, Brooks also performed with a country and western vocal group known as the Hi-Hatters. In 1997 Brooks was inducted into the Buffalo Broadcasters Association Hall of Fame. Moving to the West Coast, he launched a career as a stand-up comic and character actor.

In 1960, Brooks moved with his family to Los Angeles to seek more professional opportunities. During this time, he appeared on television comedies such as The Munsters, The Monkees and Bewitched. Brooks also delivered Christmas mail and phone books, and managed an apartment building in North Hollywood. In addition, he worked as a security guard for the Los Angeles Dodgers baseball team.

On the syndicated Steve Allen Show of the 1960s, Allen introduced Brooks as an important movie producer. Brooks stumbled on stage doing his drunk act, fooling some of the other guests. Brooks claimed to be the executive in charge of editing movies for television. His biggest success, he said, was the famous movie The Three Commandments. His character also claimed to have invented the concept of removing clips from the movies and inserting commercials.

In 1969, game show icon and television personality Dennis James took his friend Brooks to a North Carolina charity golf tournament to tell some jokes, and then introduced Brooks to good friend, singer Perry Como, who in turn gave the comedian his major break. Como chose Brooks to open for him at a Las Vegas hotel. When the hotel's owners balked at Como's choice due to Brooks' age and lack of fame, Como insisted and the owners acquiesced. Brooks was an instant hit. He made his first appearance soon thereafter on The Tonight Show Starring Johnny Carson.

== Career ==
Brooks regularly appeared on The Dean Martin Show television program in the 1970s (for which he garnered an Emmy Award nomination in 1974) as well as many situation comedies and talk shows, (including The Tonight Show Starring Johnny Carson). Mr. Brooks appeared many times on the Bill Cosby variety show in 1972.

His signature routine was the basis of a hit comedy album titled Foster Brooks, The Lovable Lush, released in the early 1970s. As his "Lovable Lush" character, Brooks usually portrayed a conventioneer who had had a few too many drinks—not falling-down drunk, but inebriated enough to mix up his words and burp to comedic delight. Brooks is best remembered for his appearances on The Dean Martin Celebrity Roast during the 1970s, where he roasted other comedians, such as Don Rickles, Johnny Carson and Lucille Ball, and serious public figures such as writer Truman Capote, consumer activist Ralph Nader, and former vice president Hubert Humphrey.

During his period of greatest fame, Brooks rarely drank. Of giving up drinking to win a bet in 1964, Brooks said, "A fellow made me a $10 bet I couldn't quit, and I haven't had a drink since. At the time I needed the $10."

He would occasionally make cameo appearances in which his character was perfectly sober, such as his appearance in a 1968 episode of Adam-12 playing a strait-laced citizen who tries to get out of a parking ticket by dropping the name of an officer senior to the main characters. He also played the character Harry Sachs in a 1969 episode of Adam-12 in which he performed as a highly intoxicated man standing in the middle of a street, waving his suit jacket at oncoming traffic, as if he were a bullfighter. In a later Adam-12 episode, he plays a stoned man, stopped for erratic driving, who tries to hide the burning marijuana "joint" in his suit's front pocket. In a more serious Adam-12 appearance, he portrayed a drunken driver who killed another driver in an accident on Christmas Eve.

On the comedy series Green Acres in the 1969 episode "Economy Flight to Washington", Brooks' boozy, bobble-headed character meets and befriends the pig Arnold Ziffel in a hotel bar. In the scene, ostensibly through the haze of alcohol, Brooks mistakes the anthropomorphic pig for a U.S. Air Force lieutenant, since the animal is sitting on a bar stool and is wearing a white leather aviator's cap, goggles, and a red scarf. Brooks acted again on Green Acres in 1969, this time giving a "sober" performance as Charlie Williams, a chemist, in the episode "The Milk Maker". The following year he returned to his whiskey-soaked persona on the television western The High Chaparral. Brooks asked Dean Martin to join his group "Alcoholics Unanimous", a play on Alcoholics Anonymous. He boasted he and Martin were charter members of the DUI (Driving Under the Influence) Hall of Fame.

In the 1970s, Brooks appeared as a celebrity panelist on the game shows Celebrity Sweepstakes, Hollywood Squares and Match Game, and in 1979, he appeared in the film The Villain as a bank clerk.

Public sensibilities had changed regarding alcoholics and public drunkenness by the 1980s, so Brooks moved away from his drunken character. In 1983, Brooks appeared in the film Cannonball Run II with comedians Louis Nye and Sid Caesar as fishermen in a rowboat. He had a recurring role as Mr. Sternhagen, Mindy's boss on Mork & Mindy. His name was a moniker on a Louisville celebrity golf tournament benefiting Kosair Charities. Brooks was a Shriner and member of the Al Malaikah Shriners, Los Angeles. He also made occasional guest appearances on TV shows in which he would demonstrate his singing voice.

Brooks' last performance was at a celebrity roast in Las Vegas for Zsa Zsa Gabor.

== Later career and legacy ==
Years later Brooks was referred to on the Cartoon Network television show Space Ghost Coast to Coast (episode 45, "Switcheroo II"). He was featured in a scene that was cut before being aired, but the scene was later included on the Space Ghost Coast to Coast volume 3 DVD release. He is also referenced on an episode of Get a Life called "Paperboy 2000". On the March 1, 2010, episode of The Daily Show, Jon Stewart referred to Senator Sheldon Whitehouse's mispronunciation of a constituent's name by saying, "It's not supposed to end on a Foster Brooks hiccup." He was mentioned in the lyrics of a Loudon Wainwright III song, "Wine With Dinner".

== Personal life ==
Brooks was first married to Loretta Brooks, with whom he had a son and three daughters; one daughter died in infancy. Foster and Loretta divorced in 1950. That same year, he married Teri Brooks, with whom he had two daughters. Brooks' brother, Tom, was a well-known entertainer in Louisville for many years. Brooks's nephew Randy Brooks is a comedy songwriter, best known for his composition "Grandma Got Run Over by a Reindeer", recorded by Randy's friend Elmo Shropshire and inspired by an unnamed "tipsy" member of the Brooks family.

== Death ==
Brooks died on December 20, 2001, at his home in Encino, California, from heart failure. He was 89 years old.

== Filmography ==
=== Film ===
| Year | Title | Role | Notes |
|---|---|---|---|
| 1971 | The Late Liz | Howard Borman | |
| 1976 | Super Seal | Harold | |
| 1979 | The Villain | Bank Clerk | |
| 1983 | Cracking Up | The Pilot | |
| 1984 | Oddballs | Hardy Bassett | |
| 1984 | Cannonball Run II | Fisherman #1 | |
| 1986 | GoBots: Battle of the Rock Lords | Stoneheart / Fossil Lord | Voice |
| 1991 | The Giant of Thunder Mountain | Doc (Townsman) | |

=== Television ===
| Year | Title | Role | Notes |
|---|---|---|---|
| 1962 | Gunsmoke | Ed | S8:E3, "Quint Asper Comes Home" |
| 1965 | The Munsters | The Admiral | S2:E6, "Happy 100th Anniversary" |
| 1966 | I Dream of Jeannie | Englishman | S1:E16, "Get Me to Mecca on Time" |
| 1966 | Tammy | Elmer | S1:E25, "Uncle Lucius Returns" |
| 1966 | Bewitched | Robert Andrews | S2:E29, "Disappearing Samantha" |
| 1966 | Laredo | Harry Tyson | S2:E9, "One Two Many Voices" |
| 1967 | Mr. Terrific | 1st Man | S1:E2, "Mr. Big Curtsies Out" |
| 1967 | The Monkees | Conventioneer | S1:E30, "Monkees in Manhattan" |
| 1967 | The Flying Nun | Passenger | S1:E12, "Young Man with a Cornette" |
| 1968 | Death Valley Days | Phil Stockton | S16:E21, "A Friend Indeed" |
| 1968 | It Takes a Thief | Judge | S2:E6, "The Packager" |
| 1968 | It Takes a Thief | Drunk | S2:E9, "A Case of Red Turnips" |
| 1968 | The Beverly Hillbillies | Fiddlin Sam Dingle | S6:E25, "The Clampetts Fiddle Around" |
| 1968 | Green Acres | Major | S3:E27, "The Rutabaga Story" |
| 1968 | Adam-12 | Man | S1:E10, "Log 132: Producer" |
| 1968 | Adam-12 | Citizen | S1:E12, "Log 61: The Runaway" |
| 1969 | Green Acres | Man | S4:E19, "Economy Flight to Washington" |
| 1969 | Green Acres | Charlie Williams | S4:E25, "The Milk Maker" |
| 1969 | The Mod Squad | Will Jackson | S1:E22, "Child of Sorrow, Child of Light" |
| 1969 | The Survivors | Stafford | S1:E7, "Chapter Seven" |
| 1969 | Bonanza | Judge | S11:E1, "Another Windmill to Go" |
| 1969 | Adam-12 | Harry Sachs | S2:E7, "Log 63: Baby" |
| 1970 | Bonanza | Judge Rogers | S11:E20, "The Law and Billy Burgess" |
| 1970 | The High Chaparral | Drunk | S3:E21, "The Reluctant Deputy" |
| 1970 | Daniel Boone | Stranger | S6:E24, "Bringing Up Josh" |
| 1970 | Gunsmoke | Sporting Gentleman #1 | S16:E9, "The Gun" |
| 1970 | Adam-12 | George Selfridge | S3:E11, "Log 46: Pilgrimage" |
| 1971 | The Beverly Hillbillies | Man | S9:E15, "The Grun Incident" |
| 1971 | Green Acres | Farmer #1 | S6:E23, "The Hole in the Porch" |
| 1971 | The Partners | Willy Cooper | S1:E3, "The Prisoner of Fender" |
| 1972 | Arnie | Dr. Matthews | S2:E17, "What's Up, Doc?" |
| 1972 | Adam-12 | Mr. Allen | S4:E19, "Mary Hong Loves Tommy Chen" |
| 1973 | Here's Lucy | David Benton Miller | S6:E10, "Tipsy Through the Tulips" |
| 1976 | Starsky & Hutch | Drunk Gambler | S2:E1, "The Las Vegas Strangler, Part 1" |
| 1977 | Switch | Dale Abee | 2 episodes |
| 1977 | Police Woman | Darryl Everson | S4:E9, "Ambition" |
| 1978 | Fantasy Island | Frank 'Spider' Randall | S1:E12, "The Over-the-Hill Caper/Poof, You're a Movie Star" |
| 1979 | Sweepstakes | Edgar | S1:E1, "Lynn and Grover and Joey" |
| 1979 | B. J. and the Bear | Terry Morgan | S1:E3, "A Coffin with a View" |
| 1981 | Mork & Mindy | Miles Sternhagen | 3 episodes |
| 1982 | Today's FBI | Rainey | S1:E18, "Kidnap" |
| 1982 | Madame's Place | Self | S1:E18, "Who Laughs Last?" |
| 1983 | Quincy, M.E. | Carriage Driver | S8:E19, "Murder on Ice" |
| 1986 | Small Wonder | Roland Cardwell | S2:E5, "Home Sweet Homeless" |
| 1987 | The New Mike Hammer | Manny, The Great Mandrell | S3:E12, "Elegy for a Tramp" |
| 1987 | Murder, She Wrote | Simon Thane | S3:E17, "Simon Says, Color Me Dead" |
| 1990 | The Munsters Today | Igor | S2:E13, "Reunion" |
| 1990 | What a Dummy | Jackie Clark | S1:E1, "What a Dummy" |
| 1996 | Cosby | Actor | S1:E5, "The Best Little Antique Shop in Astoria" |

== See also ==
- List of comedians
- List of people from the Louisville metropolitan area
