= The Golddiggers =

Singing and dancing troupe

The Golddiggers was a female singing and dancing troupe created for The Dean Martin Show. They performed on TV, live tours, and internationally with the USO. The group was formed in 1968, dissolved in 1992, and reorganized in 2007. It has numbered between four and thirteen members over various time periods.

The group debuted on The Dean Martin Show and was later featured in a summer replacement television series on NBC over three seasons. In addition to backing Dean Martin on his show and in his nightclub act, the group performed on their own on other television programs, in live venues, and in three of Bob Hope's Christmas tours. Several members of the original (1968 to 1973) troupe continue to perform as "The Golddiggers," while other former group members perform in other acts, groups, or as solo artists.

== History ==
The original idea, to form a group of singer-dancers that would be called "The Golddiggers", grew out of a need to find a vehicle that would hold the attention of audiences during the summer months. That was when The Dean Martin Show – which began airing as a weekly series on NBC Television in September 1965 – would complete its regular season run and go on hiatus (as was standard practice with virtually all variety series during that era).

It was Dean Martin Show producer-director Greg Garrison who hatched the notion of a series with a nostalgic 1930s motif, and Dean Martin Show music director Lee Hale who, inspired by the chorus line dancers known as "The Gold Diggers" featured in the Busby Berkeley and Warner Bros. films of the 1930s and 1940s, thought of the name The Golddiggers to dub the ensemble of attractive and talented women around which this new show would revolve.

The initial group, which had 12 performers, was introduced on The Dean Martin Show in Spring 1968.

On June 20, 1968, they debuted in their own weekly summer variety series, Dean Martin Presents The Golddiggers. The program was the top-rated series of the 1968 summer season, and returned the following July (1969) – with a somewhat altered lineup of performers – once again serving as the summer replacement series in Dean Martin's Thursday night time slot.

For the series' third summer outing (which launched in July 1970) it shifted locales to London, with the title modified to become Dean Martin Presents The Golddiggers In London. In addition to airing for an hour each week on NBC in the U.S., this edition of The Golddiggers' series was also seen in a half-hour weekly form in England.

In between their summer series, The Golddiggers made occasional appearances on The Dean Martin Show and other programs, and joined Bob Hope in 1968, 1969, and 1970 on his annual USO-sponsored Christmas tours of U.S. military bases around the globe. Highlights of these trips were broadcast annually as specials on NBC, and drew some of the highest ratings of any programs during the years that they were telecast.

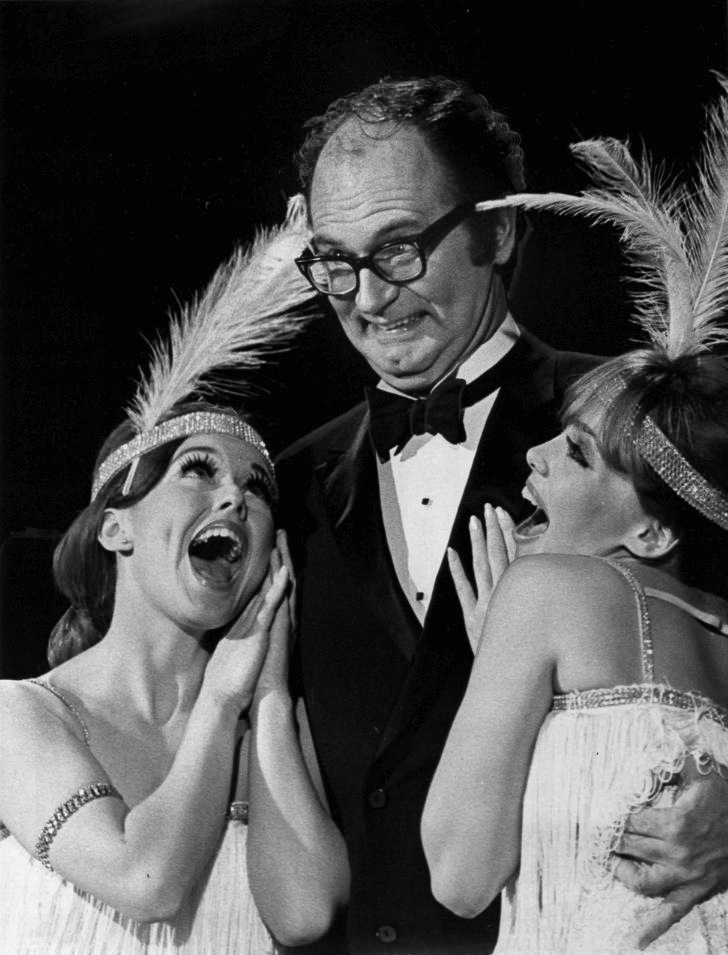
Charles Nelson Reilly flanked by two dancers in the season premiere of NBC's The Golddiggers (1970)

In the fall of 1970, The Golddiggers returned to the U.S. and became a regular part of the cast of The Dean Martin Show. That same season, four of the members of The Golddiggers (Michelle DellaFave, Tara Leigh, Susan Lund, and Wanda Bailey) were selected by Greg Garrison and Lee Hale to form a smaller quartet called 'The Dingaling Sisters', which appeared from time to time in their own solo performances on Martin's show.

In fall 1971, The Golddiggers group was spun off from The Dean Martin Show to headline their own weekly half-hour syndicated series entitled Chevrolet Presents The Golddiggers. At the same time, a revamped version of The Dingaling Sisters (comprising Michelle DellaFave, Tara Leigh, Taffy Jones, and Lynne Latham) succeeded The Golddiggers as the regular female singer/dancers on The Dean Martin Show.

Two of the performers joining The Dingaling Sisters during the 1972–73 seasons who would later go on to greater renown were Lindsay Bloom (who appeared in many feature films and co-starred in the 1980s in the weekly CBS series Mickey Spillane's Mike Hammer); and Jayne Kennedy (who would become well known to American television audiences in the late 1970s and early '80s as a co-host of The NFL Today on CBS).

The Golddiggers' syndicated series, which debuted in 1971, aired for two seasons until the early spring of 1973.

The Golddiggers recorded three albums, the first in early 1969, when Metromedia Records released The Golddiggers (MD1009), and within only a few months, released a second album, The Golddiggers, We Need a Little Christmas (MD 1012). In 1971, RCA Corporation released their third album, The Golddiggers… Today (LSP-4643).

"It got to the point where it got too expensive to have so many girls... they weren't being treated very fairly... It was getting really bad for the girls so they all got together and said, 'We're not going to do this anymore' and they all quit". - Neil Daniels, former NBC VP and founder Dean Martin Fan Center.

"That was the end of the line for us". -Susan Lund, original Golddigger.

In 1973, a new group was chosen: Alberici Sisters - Maria Lauren (aka: Maria Elena Alberici) and Linda Eichberg (aka: Linda Alberici), Patti Gribow (aka: Patti Pivarnik), Deborah Pratt, Susan Buckner, Robin Hoctor, Lee Nolting and Colleen Kincaid.

"To the winners Garrison was all smiles and congratulations."

From 1973 until the 1990s The Golddiggers appeared regularly on Dean Martin's television specials. The biggest country music artists would join Martin and The Golddiggers on the Dean Martin Comedy Hour with a medley of hits: Lynn Anderson, Conway Twitty, Ray Stevens, Buck Owens, Loretta Lynn, Mac Davis, Mel Tillis, as well as entertainers Dionne Warwick, Gene Kelly, Donald O'Connor, and the top comedians for the Roasts segment.

The Golddiggers also took their talent on the road, opening the Las Vegas MGM Grand Hotel and Casino performing with Martin in the "Celebrity Room" to sold-out crowds of more than 2 million people.

They were the opening act for Petula Clark, Steve and Eydie, Joan Rivers at Caesars Palace and Bally's Las Vegas, and toured with Bob Hope, Louis Prima, Jerry Vale, and many more entertainers. In 1977, The Golddiggers of the Frank Sinatra and Dean Martin tour were Maria Lauren and Linda Eichberg (performing as the Alberici Sisters), Patti Gribow, Peggy Gohl, Joyce Garro and Robyn Whatley.

1978 brought in a new look to The Golddiggers with new members Linda Snook, Marie Halton, Melody Ruhe, and Julia Hanibal joining remaining members, Robyn Whatley and Peggy Gohl.

The Golddiggers continued with another Mexico tour and also as Martin's opening act in Vegas. The group was booked for television and more Christmas in California specials... "Before long we rejoined The Golddiggers. Working with Dean was a safe haven for us and we continued to perform with him until he retired in 1991."

All of The Golddiggers' musical performances were under the direction of Lee Hale, who later wrote in Backstage at the Dean Martin Show, "Although the group started as an even dozen, they ended up as a quartet opening for Dean at his monthly dates in Las Vegas. Those last four girls were definitely among the best."

Former Dean Martin Golddiggers, including Patti (Pivarnik) Gribow, Joyce Garro, Linda Bott, Marie Halton, Robyn Whatley, Peggy Gohl, Deborah Pratt, Susan Buckner, and the Alberici Sisters: Maria Lauren and Linda Eichberg, have lent their talents to charity events to help the performing arts, women, youth, and AIDS.

In 1997, Kalliope Zafiriou, former wife of the UFO religion leader Billy Meier, revealed in an interview that Meier had hoaxed his followers by claiming photographs that he had of members of The Golddiggers were photographs of human-like extraterrestrials that he met. Meier passed off the photographs he had of Golddiggers members Michelle DellaFave and Susan Lund were photographs of the alien women "Asket" and "Nera". Further research showed that Zafiriou was correct and that the images were screenshots of a Golddiggers performance on The Dean Martin Show, proving that the photographs were of earthlings and not of aliens.

== Members ==
At various times, members included:

- Sheila (Mann) Allan
- Pauline Antony
- Wanda Bailey
- Pamela Beth
- Nancy Bonetti
- Patti Booth
- Kathy Brimer
- Susan Buckner
- Susan Cadham
- Jimmi Cannon
- Karen Cavanaugh
- Darlene (Alberici) Cianci
- Loyita Chapel
- Jackie Chidsey
- Paula Cinko
- Rosetta Cox
- Lee Crawford
- Cathy Lee Crosby
- Lezlie Dalton
- Michelle DellaFave
- Tanya DellaFave
- Karen Dolin
- Lynn Dolin
- Wendy Douglas
- Linda (Alberici) Eichberg
- Merry Elkins
- Brooke Fisher
- Joyce Garro
- Patti Gegenheimer
- Peggy Gohl
- Patti (Pivaar) Gribow
- Marie Halton
- Julia Hannibal
- Peggy Hansen
- Joy Hawkins
- Robin Horneff
- Sandra Hunt
- Rebecca Jones
- Liz Kelley
- Wendy Kimball
- Colleen (Kincaid) Jackson
- Maria (Alberici) Lauren
- Tara Leigh
- Julie Leven
- Diana Liekhus
- Susan Lund
- Nancy Maier
- Cheryl Masterson
- Debi McFarland
- Micki McGlone
- Francie Mendenhall
- Patricia Mickey
- Theresa (Bishop) Miller
- Lee Nolting
- Marilyn O'Leary
- Darlina Olsen
- Cynthia Pickett
- Brenda Powell
- Deborah Pratt
- Nancy Reichert
- Melody Ruhe
- Barbara Sanders
- Jeanne Sheffield
- Linda Snook Bott
- Lorraine Smith
- Holly Smith
- Lynn Steiner
- Debbie Thomason
- Tracy Tucciarone
- Sheryl Ullman
- Robyn Whatley
- Janice Whitby
- Mary Beth Williams
- Mary K. (“Kathy”)Wright
- Glenda Yenta

== Albums ==
- The Golddiggers (1969)
- We Need a Little Christmas (1969)
- The Golddiggers… Today! (1971)

== See also ==
- The Dean Martin Show
