= The Dean Martin Show =

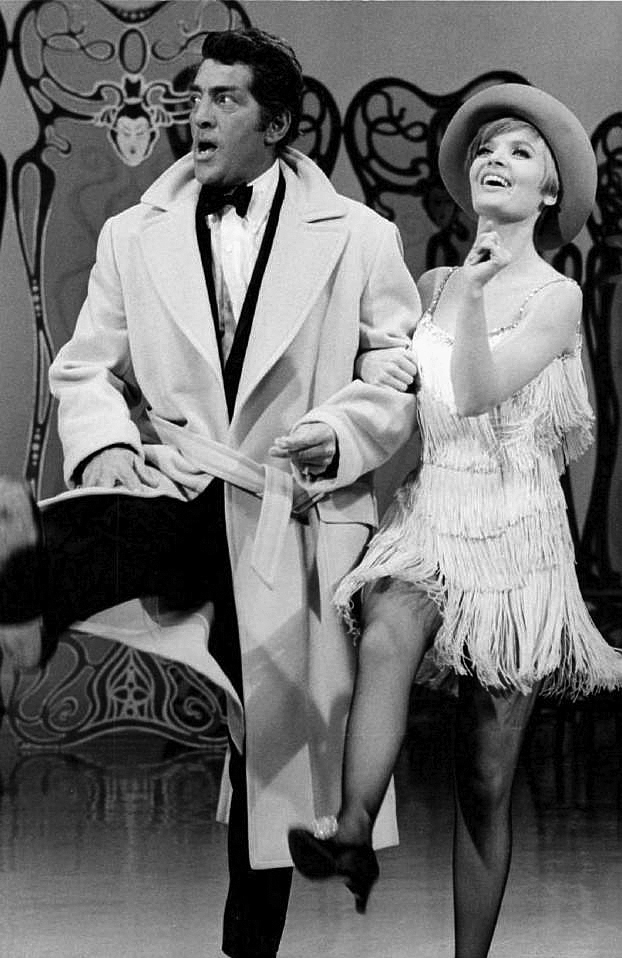
- Martin with guest Florence Henderson, 1968
- Genre: Variety / comedy
- Written by: Arnie Kogen; Ed. Weinberger
- Directed by: Greg Garrison
- Presented by: Dean Martin
- Country of origin: United States
- Original language: English
- No. of seasons: 9
- No. of episodes: 264

Production
- Producer: Greg Garrison
- Production locations: NBC Studios; Burbank, California
- Running time: 60 minutes

Original release
- Network: NBC
- Release: September 16, 1965 – April 5, 1974

Related
- The Dean Martin Celebrity Roast

The Dean Martin Show is a TV variety-comedy series that ran from 1965 to 1974 for 264 episodes. It was broadcast by NBC and hosted by Dean Martin. The theme song to the series was his 1964 hit "Everybody Loves Somebody".

== Nielsen ratings ==
- Season 1 (September 16, 1965 – May 5, 1966, 31 episodes): #52
- Season 2 (September 8, 1966 – April 27, 1967, 33 episodes): #14
- Season 3 (September 14, 1967 – April 4, 1968, 30 episodes): #8
- Season 4 (September 19, 1968 – April 24, 1969, 30 episodes): #8
- Season 5 (September 18, 1969 – June 18, 1970, 31 episodes): #14
- Season 6 (September 17, 1970 – April 8, 1971, 28 episodes): #24
- Season 7 (September 16, 1971 – April 13, 1972, 28 episodes): #36
- Season 8 (September 14, 1972 – April 12, 1973, 28 episodes): #49
- Season 9 (September 6, 1973 – April 5, 1974, 25 episodes): #42

This was Martin's second run as a variety show host, as he previously hosted two variety shows that aired on the NBC anthology series Ford Startime (1959–1960).

The series was a staple for NBC, airing Thursdays at 10:00 p.m. for eight years until its move to Fridays at 10:00 p.m. for the final season and a change in format. It was more popular among white-collar workers than with blue-collar ones; a 1968 survey ranked the show #2 overall among white-collar workers and the highest-ranked first-run series (the highest-rated show among white collar workers was a Saturday night movie umbrella showcase), ranking ahead of the overall first place program The Andy Griffith Show in that demographic.

The Dean Martin Celebrity Roast, a series of specials spun off from the final season, generated solid ratings for 10 years on NBC.

== Development ==
Martin was initially reluctant to do the show, partially because he did not want to turn down movie and nightclub performances. His terms were deliberately unrealistic: as author Lee Hale recalled, "He presented [NBC] with a list of demands he thought it would be impossible to fill. He asked for an outrageous amount of money, of course, but there was more. He only wanted to work one day a week, and that day had to be Sunday. He didn't want to do anything but announce the acts. He didn't even want to sing if he didn't feel like it... But surprisingly NBC agreed to each of his demands. 'They should have thrown them in my face,' Dean said later, 'but they agreed to it all. So what the hell, I had to show up!'" As daughter Deana Martin recalled, after meeting the network and making his demands, Martin returned home and announced to his family, "They went for it. So now I have to do it." (The terms of employment, and not having to appear for rehearsals, allowed Martin to appear in a series of Matt Helm films concurrent with the show's run, as well as other projects such as a co-starring role in the first Airport film in 1970.)

Martin believed that an important key to his popularity was that he did not put on airs. His act was that of a drunken, work-shy playboy, although the ever-present old-fashioned glass in his hand often only had apple juice in it. The show was heavy on physical comedy rather than just quips (he made his weekly entrance by sliding down a fireman's pole onto the stage.) Martin read his dialogue directly from cue cards. If he flubbed a line or forgot a lyric, Martin would not do a retake, and the mistake—and his recovery from it—went straight to tape and onto the air.

The Dean Martin Show was shot on color videotape beginning in 1965 at Studio 4 inside NBC's massive color complex at 3000 West Alameda Avenue in Burbank, California. The same studio was used for Frank Sinatra's yearly TV specials in the late 1960s, and Elvis Presley's 1968 "Comeback Special". Studio 4 is currently one of two used in the production of the soap opera Days of Our Lives.

== Regular segments ==
- Martin sang two solo numbers per show, one a serious ballad. He would join his weekly guests in song medleys, trading lyrics back and forth. Some of these duets were deliberately played for laughs—with Liberace, for example—with special lyrics by Lee Hale to suit the performers.
- One recurring segment was based on Martin's club act, in which he would begin to sing a popular song and suddenly insert a gag lyric in an attempt to make his pianist Ken Lane laugh hard enough to break his concentration. The segment usually began with Martin leaping onto Lane's piano; in one episode, the real piano was secretly replaced with a phony one that collapsed when Martin tried to leap onto it.
- A knock on the "closet" door occurred each week, with Martin opening the door to reveal an unannounced celebrity guest. Most of the time, Martin did not know who the guest would be, to keep his reactions more spontaneous, according to Hale's book Backstage at the Dean Martin Show.
- A regular gag during one season was the "Mystery Voice Contest", wherein Martin invited viewers to write in to guess who was singing a particular song. Invariably, it was the famous Frank Sinatra hit "Strangers in the Night." Finally on one episode, Sinatra appeared to announce that he was the mystery singer. Martin handed over the prize, a trip to Los Angeles, where they already lived.
- The finale was typically a production number featuring Martin and the guest stars. Occasionally it would be a musical sketch with Martin appearing as "Dino Vino", a disc jockey who played old records. A vintage record would then be heard, with Martin and his guests mouthing the words and pantomiming outrageously.
- During the show's eighth season, the finale was a selection of songs from a popular MGM film musical. Clips from the selected film would be shown, with Martin and guests singing a medley from the films. Among those saluted were Easter Parade, Words and Music, Till the Clouds Roll By and the 1951 film version of Show Boat.
- When the show was canceled in 1974, a series of Dean Martin Celebrity Roast specials were produced in Las Vegas at the MGM Grand Hotel. This tradition was started during the final season of the variety show and continued until 1984.

== Regulars and recurring guests ==
In later seasons, many regular performers were added, such as Dom DeLuise and Nipsey Russell in sketches set in a barber shop; Kay Medford and Lou Jacobi in sketches set in a diner, and Medford also pretending to be the mother of Martin's pianist, Ken Lane. Leonard Barr, Guy Marks, Tom Bosley, Marian Mercer, Charles Nelson Reilly, and Rodney Dangerfield were also featured on multiple occasions, while bandleader Les Brown was a regular.

During the inaugural 1965–1966 season, the Krofft Puppets were seen in eight episodes. Sid and Marty Krofft recall that they were fired because of an incident involving Liberace, for whom they had previously worked, and who was a great fan of their puppets. Sid Krofft states: "And he [Liberace] asked his fan club to write Dean Martin a letter and tell Dean Martin that there isn't enough puppetry on the show." Many of the letters were nasty and came in great numbers: "And so, can you imagine getting over 250 thousand letters like that in a matter of a couple of weeks, and well, he really didn't like that and fired us."

== Summer replacement series ==
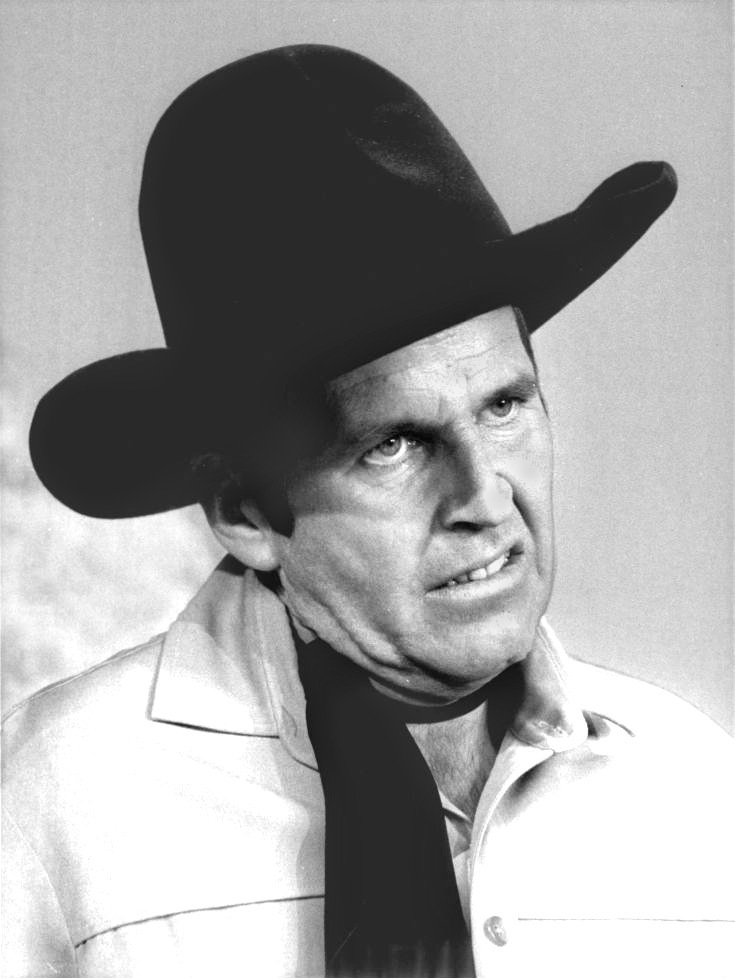
Paul Lynde in Dean Martin Presents the Golddiggers (1969)

For Martin's Thursday night-time slot, the network and Martin's production crew created original summer programming (without Martin) to hold his usual weekly audience. Rowan & Martin hosted the first. Dean Martin's 1966 summer series proved so successful that two seasons later it spawned one of television's most memorable series, Rowan & Martin's Laugh-In.

From July to September 1967, the summer show was co-hosted by Martin's daughter Gail Martin, Vic Damone and Carol Lawrence.

In 1968, Martin's staff came up with a new format: a salute to the 1930s, with a variety show performed as if television existed at that time. Producer Greg Garrison recruited a dozen chorus girls, naming the group the Golddiggers after the Warner Brothers musicals of the 1930s. The series, Dean Martin Presents the Golddiggers, starred Frank Sinatra Jr. and Joey Heatherton as musical hosts, with comedy routines by Paul Lynde, Stanley Myron Handelman, Barbara Heller, Skiles and Henderson, and neo-vaudeville musicians The Times Square Two. The summer show was a hit, returning the following year with a new cast. Lou Rawls and Gail Martin took over as hosts and six-foot-six dancer Tommy Tune was featured.

The Golddiggers also toured the nation's nightclubs as a live attraction. After the summer series ran its course, the Golddiggers were seen on Martin's own program, and four of them were used in another group, the Ding-a-Ling Sisters.

Toward the end of the Thursday-night run, the summer series was devoted to European comedians. Marty Feldman was featured in Dean Martin's Comedy World, hosted by Jackie Cooper.

== Awards ==
Emmy Award nominations

- Outstanding Individual Performance in a Variety or Music Program Foster Brooks (1974)
- Outstanding Individual Performance in a Variety or Music Program Ruth Buzzi (1974)
- Outstanding Variety, Music or Comedy Series (1972)
- Outstanding Music and Lyrics Lee Hale (1971)
- Outstanding Variety, Music or Comedy Series (1970)
- Outstanding Variety, Music or Comedy Series (1969)
- Outstanding Variety, Music or Comedy Series (1968)
- Outstanding Music and Lyrics Lee Hale (1968)
- Outstanding Variety, Music or Comedy Series (1967)
- Outstanding Writing in a Variety, Music or Comedy Program (1967)
- Outstanding Directing for a Variety, Music or Comedy Program Greg Garrison (1967)
- Outstanding Directing for a Variety, Music or Comedy Program Greg Garrison (1966)

Golden Globe Award Wins

- Best Actor in a Television Comedy Series Dean Martin (1967)

Golden Globe Award Nominations

- Best Actor in a Television Comedy Series Dean Martin (1970)
- Best Actor in a Television Comedy Series Dean Martin (1969)
- Best Actor in a Television Comedy Series Dean Martin (1968)

== Home media ==
From 2003 until August 2007, a 29-volume Best of The Dean Martin Variety Show collection was sold by direct marketing firm Guthy-Renker via infomercials and a website.

In mid-2007, NBC Universal filed suit in U.S. District Court against several parties, including Guthy-Renker, claiming copyright infringement, forcing Guthy-Renker to temporarily withdraw the DVDs from sale. The lawsuit dealt with a dispute over rights to footage used in the DVD series, material for which NBC claimed it still held the copyright. The conflict was discovered when NBC Universal looked into plans to release its own DVD set. The Dean Martin Celebrity Roast specials were not affected by the litigation.

Also named as a defendant in the lawsuit was longtime Dean Martin Show producer Greg Garrison. NBC claimed that Garrison had rights only to use excerpts from selected episodes of the show for the DVDs, episodes that the network claimed Garrison had purchased years earlier for a syndicated run of the show from 1979 to 1981. Garrison died in 2005 before the lawsuit was brought forward.

After a settlement was reached on January 2, 2008, Guthy-Renker began selling the collection again, and its televised infomercials returned.

Two other lawsuits were brought over rights to the show's material, neither of which affected sales of the home-video collection.

Total revenues from DVD sales of The Dean Martin Show have been rumored to be in the hundreds of millions of dollars. The shows have not been aired on television since their original telecasts.

A new package of DVDs was released on May 24, 2011, by Time-Life Video. Unlike the earlier Guthy-Renker collection, which was marketed via mail-order subscription, the new sets were aimed largely at the retail sector. NBC disclosed its participation with Time-Life on the project.

Dean's daughter Deana Martin claimed that the first Time-Life sets had sold so well that a second collection was being planned, and that she would be contributing commentary for it. The second release of DVDs produced by Time-Life was titled King of Cool: The Best of The Dean Martin Variety Show and was made available in one- and six-disc configurations.

== Guest-star list ==
Only the first appearance by each guest star is listed.

=== Season 1 (1965–1966) ===
- Don Adams
- Eddie Albert
- Van Alexander
- Herb Alpert & the Tijuana Brass
- Allen & Rossi
- Steve Allen
- The Andrews Sisters
- Paul Anka
- Louis Armstrong
- Frankie Avalon
- Pearl Bailey
- Lucille Ball
- Gene Baylos
- Tony Bennett
- Polly Bergen
- Milton Berle
- Shelley Berman
- John W. Bubbles
- Sam Butera & the Witnesses
- Donna Butterworth
- John Byner
- Sid Caesar
- Godfrey Cambridge
- Diahann Carroll
- Jack Carter
- Charo
- Barrie Chase
- Imogene Coca
- Bill Cosby
- Xavier Cugat
- Bill Dana (as José Jiménez)
- Vic Dana
- Dave Clark Five
- Phyllis Diller
- Dino, Desi & Billy
- Dukes of Dixieland
- Nanette Fabray
- Ferrante & Teicher
- Eddie Fisher
- Ella Fitzgerald
- Phil Ford and Mimi Hines
- Pete Fountain
- The Four Step Brothers
- John Gary
- George Gobel
- Robert Goulet
- Buddy Greco
- Joel Grey
- Tammy Grimes
- Jan & Dean
- Joey Heatherton
- Stanley Holloway
- Homer and Jethro
- Bob Hope
- Mahalia Jackson
- George Jessel
- Jack Jones
- Louis Jordan & His Tympany Five
- Lainie Kazan
- Morgana King
- Kirby Stone Four
- Lisa Kirk
- Abbe Lane
- Carol Lawrence
- Peggy Lee
- Hal Le Roy
- The Lettermen
- Shari Lewis and Lamb Chop
- Liberace
- Rich Little
- Julie London
- Dorothy Loudon
- Gisele MacKenzie
- Gordon MacRae
- Sheila MacRae
- Rose Marie
- Jackie Mason
- Johnny Mathis
- The McGuire Sisters
- Barbara McNair
- Ethel Merman
- Roger Miller
- Jane Morgan
- The New Christy Minstrels
- Bob Newhart
- Janis Paige
- Patti Page
- Marguerite Piazza
- Jane Powell
- Louis Prima and Gia Maione
- Juliet Prowse
- Line Renaud
- Frankie Randall
- The Righteous Brothers
- Chita Rivera
- Mickey Rooney
- Rowan & Martin
- Soupy Sales
- Tommy Sands
- The Serendipity Singers
- Allan Sherman
- Frank Sinatra
- Kate Smith
- Keely Smith
- Kay Starr
- The Supremes
- Pat Suzuki
- The Swingle Singers
- Danny Thomas
- The Treniers
- Leslie Uggams
- Shani Wallis
- John Wayne
- Jonathan Winters
- Gretchen Wyler
- The Young Americans

=== Season 2 (1966–1967) ===
- Edie Adams
- Eddy Arnold
- Gene Barry
- Shirley Bassey
- Janet Blair
- Ray Bolger
- George Burns
- Red Buttons
- Vikki Carr
- Don Cherry
- Petula Clark
- Tim Conway
- Bing Crosby
- Vic Damone
- Dom DeLuise
- Vince Edwards
- Duke Ellington
- Alice Faye
- Frank Fontaine
- Tennessee Ernie Ford
- Eddie Foy Jr.
- Sergio Franchi
- Connie Francis
- Arthur Godfrey
- Frank Gorshin
- Buddy Hackett
- Phil Harris
- Florence Henderson
- Herman's Hermits
- Sally Ann Howes
- Kessler Twins
- The Kim Sisters
- George Kirby
- Gene Krupa
- Trini Lopez
- Deana Martin
- Gail Martin
- Tony Martin
- Patrice Munsel
- Jan Murray
- Dorothy Provine
- Dinah Shore
- Kaye Stevens
- Caterina Valente
- Jackie Vernon
- Adam West
- Paul Winchell

=== Season 3 (1967–1968) ===
- Woody Allen
- Nancy Ames
- Carl Ballantine
- John Barbour
- Pat Boone
- Pat Buttram
- Cyd Charisse
- Rosemary Clooney
- Pat Cooper
- Norm Crosby
- Billy De Wolfe
- Buddy Ebsen
- Barbara Eden
- Jack Gilford
- Vic Grecco and Fred Willard
- Lorne Greene
- Shecky Greene
- Barbara Heller
- Pat Henry
- Lena Horne
- Van Johnson
- Julius LaRosa
- Janet Leigh
- Ross Martin
- The Mills Brothers
- Ricardo Montalbán
- Byron Nelson
- Donald O'Connor
- Buck Owens
- Minnie Pearl
- Professor Backwards
- Don Rickles
- Roy Rogers and Dale Evans
- Sandler and Young
- Phil Silvers
- Frank Sinatra Jr.
- Nancy Sinatra
- Skiles and Henderson
- David Steinberg
- James Stewart
- Orson Welles
- Flip Wilson
- Henny Youngman

=== Season 4 (1968–1969) ===
- Edgar Bergen
- Victor Borge
- Ben Blue
- Pat Crowley
- Dan Dailey
- Bobby Darin
- Elyssa Davalos
- Angie Dickinson
- David Frye
- Paul Gilbert
- Peter Graves
- Stanley Myron Handelman
- David Janssen
- Fran Jeffries
- Shirley Jones
- Will Jordan
- Michael Landon
- Gina Lollobrigida
- Gloria Loring
- Paul Lynde
- Bobbi Martin
- Zero Mostel
- Sue Raney
- Lou Rawls
- Avery Schreiber
- Sammy Shore
- Elke Sommer
- Ray Stevens
- Milburn Stone
- Dennis Weaver
- Raquel Welch

=== Season 5 (1969–1970) ===
- Ann-Margret
- Barbara Anderson
- Patti Austin
- Orson Bean
- Nino Benvenuti
- Shirley Booth
- Walter Brennan
- Albert Brooks
- Sebastian Cabot
- Carol Channing
- Lee J. Cobb
- Susan Cowsill
- Sammy Davis Jr.
- Barbara Feldon
- Margot Fonteyn
- Eva Gabor
- Alice Ghostley
- Gale Gordon
- Rocky Graziano
- Andy Griffith
- Morty Gunty
- Goldie Hawn
- Arte Johnson
- Paula Kelly
- Nancy Kwan
- Virna Lisi
- Danny Lockin
- Greg Morris
- Rudolf Nureyev
- Fess Parker
- Charles Nelson Reilly
- Marty Robbins
- Dale Robertson
- Irene Ryan
- Romy Schneider
- Forrest Tucker
- Tommy Tune
- Jennifer Warren
- Nancy Wilson

=== Season 6 (1970–1971) ===
- Lucie Arnaz
- Ronnie Barker and Ronnie Corbett
- Joey Bishop
- Eubie Blake
- Ernest Borgnine
- Jim Brown
- Raymond Burr
- Ruth Buzzi
- Glen Campbell
- Odia Coates
- Britt Ekland
- The Everly Brothers
- Peter Falk
- Marty Feldman
- Glenn Ford
- Joe Frazier
- Kathleen Freeman
- David Frost
- Engelbert Humperdinck
- Milt Kamen
- Meredith MacRae
- Dean Paul Martin
- Kay Medford
- Joe Namath
- Maureen Reagan
- Debbie Reynolds
- Sugar Ray Robinson
- Kenny Rogers & The First Edition
- Jill St. John
- Alan Sues
- The Temptations
- Dionne Warwick

=== Season 7 (1971–1972) ===
- Dan Blocker
- Tom Bosley
- Joyce Brothers
- Art Carney
- Johnny Carson
- Richard S. Castellano
- Mike Connors
- Howard Cosell
- Lou Jacobi
- Jack Kruschen
- Meredith Mercer
- Don Meredith
- Wayne Newton
- Carroll O'Connor
- Jo Ann Pflug
- Ginger Rogers
- Elaine Stritch
- Rip Taylor

=== Season 8 (1972–1973) ===
- Lynn Anderson
- Eve Arden
- Jack Benny
- Karen Black
- Lloyd Bridges
- Joseph Campanella
- William Conrad
- Rodney Dangerfield
- Bobby Goldsboro
- Monty Hall
- Dennis Hopper
- Gene Kelly
- Steve Landesberg
- Steve Lawrence
- Martin Milner
- Anna Moffo
- Anne Murray
- Olivia Newton-John
- Hugh O'Brian
- Gilbert O'Sullivan
- Charley Pride
- Richard Roundtree
- Nipsey Russell
- Peter Sellers
- O. C. Smith

=== Season 9 (1973–1974) ===
- Dorsey Burnette
- Doug Dillard
- Donna Fargo
- Tom T. Hall
- William Holden
- Ferlin Husky
- Doug Kershaw
- Gladys Knight & the Pips
- Kris Kristofferson and Rita Coolidge
- Loretta Lynn
- Audrey Meadows
- Ray Price
- Charlie Rich
- Jeannie C. Riley
- Johnny Russell
- The Statler Brothers

== Use of screenshots for Billy Meier's alien hoax ==
The UFO religion leader Billy Meier has passed off images of The Golddiggers performing on The Dean Martin Show as photographs of extraterrestrials that he met who physically resemble humans from Earth. This was first revealed by Meier's ex-wife, Kalliope Zafiriou, that the photographs Meier claimed were of the alien women "Asket" and "Nera" were actually photographs of Michelle DellaFave and Susan Lund from The Golddiggers. It was later confirmed that the images of the so-called "aliens" were a hoax and were indeed screenshots taken from a Golddiggers performance featuring DellaFave and Lund on an episode of The Dean Martin Show and thus of earthly and not extraterrestrial origin and were photographs of earthlings.
