= Pure Connie Smith =

Studio album by Connie Smith
- Released: November 1977
- Recorded: February – March 1977
- Studio: Columbia (Nashville, Tennessee); Woodland (Nashville, Tennessee)
- Genre: Country pop
- Label: Monument
- Producer: Ray Baker

Connie Smith chronology
I Don't Wanna Talk It Over Anymore (1976)	Pure Connie Smith (1977)	New Horizons (1978)

Singles from Pure Connie Smith
- 1. "Coming Around" Released: March 1977

Pure Connie Smith is the twenty-ninth solo studio album by American country singer Connie Smith. It was released in November 1977 via Monument Records and contained ten tracks. The album was Smith's first with the Monument label. The album was recorded in a country pop production style featuring mostly new recordings. One single was released from the album, "Coming Around". The song charted the American country songs chart in 1977.

== Background, recording and content ==
Connie Smith moved to Columbia Records in 1973 after 18 top ten Billboard country singles at the RCA Victor label in the 1960s. At Columbia, Smith had continued commercial success but with less frequency. Only two of her singles reached the country top ten, while a majority reached the top 20. Smith's final Columbia album was issued in 1976. She left the label in 1977, theorizing that her music lacked the promotion that more popular Columbia acts received like George Jones or Tammy Wynette. Instead, Smith signed with Monument Records in 1977, owned by Fred Foster. According to Smith, Foster told her that he wanted to craft her into "another Roy Orbison."

Smith's first Monument album was recorded between February and March 1977. The project was cut at both the Columbia Studios and Woodland Sound Studios, both of which were located in Nashville, Tennessee. The sessions were produced by Ray Baker. Baker had been serving as Smith's producer since 1973 and he moved forward with her to Monument. The first Monument project consisted of ten tracks. and a country pop approach that Smith was pressured into. Included was a cover of "When It's Just You and Me", which had been a top 20 country single for Dottie West. Smith also recorded new material written by songwriters (and artists) like Dallas Frazier, Don Gibson, Dave Loggins.

== Release, singles and reception ==
Pure Connie Smith was released by Monument Records in November 1977. It was distributed as a vinyl LP, containing five songs on either side of the record. In total, it was the thirty first studio album of Smith's career. The only single included on the album was "Coming Around", which was first issued in March 1977. Spending seven weeks on the Billboard Hot Country Songs chart, it only reached number 58. It was Smith's second lowest-charting single up to that point.

The album did not initially receive much critical attention. However, years later, Monument released a compilation of Smith's material titled Greatest Hits on Monument. Two tracks from Pure Connie Smith were featured on the disc. Reviewer Stephen Thomas Erlewine commented on the music's production and theorized why the music did not get notable attention. "This is commercial music that doesn't really work. It has a state-of-the-art production that dates instantly, walks the line between crossover pop and country-pop rather clumsly, and lacks good material. Smith still sings well throughout it, but it's not a very good showcase for her talents, nor is it very good as crossover pop -- it's too square and middle of the road, making the urban cowboy bubbling up at the time seem risky and edgy," he stated.

== Track listing ==
Side one
No.	Title	Writer(s)	Length
1.	"Coming Around"	Red Lane	2:27
2.	"That's What Loving You Can Do"	Don Gibson	2:10
3.	"Don't Treat Me Like a Stranger"	Dave Loggins	2:55
4.	"Scrapbook"	Tupper Saussy	3:52
5.	"Every Move You Make (Is Saying Goodbye)"	Steve Collom	2:30

Side two
No.	Title	Writer(s)	Length
1.	"It Pleases Me to Please You"	Loggins	3:20
2.	"I Don't Want to Be Free"	Paul Craft	2:15
3.	"When It's Just You and Me"	Kenny O'Dell	3:39
4.	"You and Love and I"	Warren Robb; Sanger D. Shafer	2:45
5.	"Lovin' One Day at a Time"	Kenny Walker	2:41

== Personnel ==
All credits are adapted from the liner notes of Pure Connie Smith.

Musical personnel

- Byron Bach — Strings
- George Binkley III — Strings
- Kenny Buttrey — Drums
- John Allan Catchings — Strings
- Marvin Chantry — Strings
- Roy Christensen — Strings
- Virginia Christensen — Strings
- Tommy Cogbill — Bass
- Ray Edenton — Guitar
- Johnny Gimble — Mandolin
- Carl Gorodetzky — Strings
- Lloyd Green — Steel guitar
- Lennie Haight — Strings
- George Jackson — Guitar
- Shane Keister — Piano
- Shelly Kurland — Strings
- The Lea Jane Singers — Background vocals
- Kenny Malone — Drums
- Grady Martin — Guitar
- Charlie McCoy — Harmonica
- Ann R. Migliore —Strings
- Bob Moore — Bass
- The Nashville Edition — Background vocals
- Ron Oates — Piano
- Leon Rhodes — Bass
- Robert Thompson — Guitar
- Steven Maxwell Smith — Strings
- Jerry Stembridge — Guitar
- Samuel Terranera — Strings
- Gary Vanosdale — Strings
- Reggie Young — Guitar

Technical personnel

- Ray Baker — Producer
- Rex Collier — Engineer
- Ronnie Dean — Engineer
- Ken Kim — Art direction, photography
- David McKinley — Engineer
- Ronnie Reynolds — Engineer
- Hank Williams — Engineer

== Release history ==
Region	Date	Format	Label	Ref.
North America	November 1977	Vinyl	Monument Records	
