= Jackie Gayle =

Jack Potovsky

- Gayle in Houston, 1967
- Born: Jack Potovsky; March 1, 1926; Flatbush, Brooklyn, New York, U.S.
- Died: November 23, 2002 (aged 76); Miami Beach, Florida, U.S.
- Occupations: comedian, actor
- Spouse: Tracy Gayle

Jackie Gayle (March 1, 1926 – November 23, 2002), born Jack Potovsky, was an American standup comedian and actor. He performed as a comedian for 40 years, appearing in nightclubs and in Las Vegas, including working as the opening act for such performers as Frank Sinatra and Tony Bennett. He also appeared on more than 20 episodes of The Dean Martin Celebrity Roast. His acting credits include Barry Levinson's Tin Men (1987), Woody Allen's Broadway Danny Rose (1984) and Warren Beatty's Bulworth (1998), among others.

== Partial filmography ==
- The Seven Minutes (1971) - Norman Quandt
- Wacky Taxi (1972) - Projectionist
- Mafia on the Bounty (1980) - Pinky / Captain Bligh
- Tempest (1982) - Trinc
- Broadway Danny Rose (1984) - Jackie Gayle
- Tin Men (1987) - Sam
- Plain Clothes (1987) - Coach Zeffer
- Bert Rigby, You're a Fool (1989) - I.I. Perlestein
- Mr. Saturday Night (1992) - Gene
- Bulworth (1998) - Macavoy, Bullworth's Chauffeur
