= Greg Garrison (television producer) =

American TV director/producer (1924–2005)

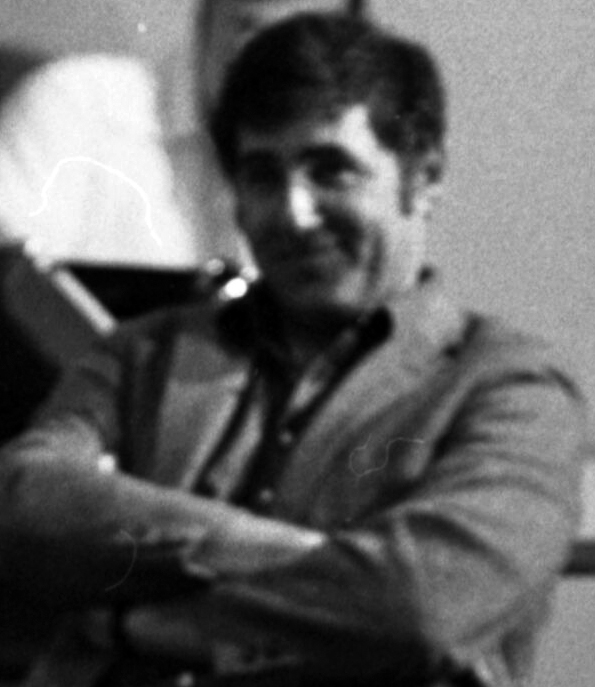
- Born: Harvin Ginsburg; February 20, 1924
- Died: March 25, 2005 (aged 81); Thousand Oaks, California, U.S.
- Education: Northwestern University
- Occupation(s): Television producer, director
- Known for: Variety, comedy

Harvin Ginsburg (February 20, 1924 – March 25, 2005), known professionally as Greg Garrison, was an American producer and director in television.

== Career ==
While he was a 17-year-old student at Northwestern University, Garrison worked as a copy boy in a Chicago radio station's news department. His education and that job were interrupted by World War II. After the war, he became a director in Philadelphia. A career move took him from there to Chicago, where he created series, including Stand By for Crime.

Garrison started his television career by accident at the age of 22. Among his first productions were The Kate Smith Show (CBS, 1950) and Your Show of Shows. He went on to produce and direct many television specials with Gene Kelly, Fred Astaire, Donald O'Connor and many others. Garrison directed the feature films Hey, Let's Twist! (1961), and Two Tickets to Paris (1962). He was probably best known for producing and directing The Dean Martin Show, The Dean Martin Celebrity Roasts, hour-long comedy specials with Dom DeLuise, and summer shows with Dan Rowan and Dick Martin, Jonathan Winters, The Golddiggers, and Marty Feldman. He also directed one of television's landmark 1960 presidential debates between John F. Kennedy and Richard Nixon. Garrison also produced the highly successful The first Fifty Years, a celebration of NBC Television being on the air for fifty years.

Garrison directed nearly 4,000 shows in his career. He received more than a dozen Emmy Award nominations, although he never won.

== Later years ==
In his later years, Garrison supervised for Guthy-Renker the digital remastering of The Dean Martin Show and celebrity roasts for release on DVD. The marketing of these included an entertaining infomercial with clips of an interview of Garrison by host Regis Philbin about his memories of producing/directing the Martin show.

A close friend of Orson Welles, he was the executor of his estate following Welles' death in 1985.

== Death ==
Garrison died from pneumonia at his home in Thousand Oaks, California, on March 25, 2005, at the age of 81.
