= Harry Romm =

American film producer (1896–1986)

Harry Romm (1896–1986) was an American producer and agent. He was a long time agent for The Three Stooges.

Romm turned to producing movies in the late 1940s. He returned to it in the late 1950s.

== Select credits ==
- Swing Parade of 1946 (1946)
- Ladies of the Chorus (1948)
- Senior Prom (1958)
- Have Rocket, Will Travel (1959)
- Hey, Let's Twist! (1961)
- Stop! Look! and Laugh! (1961)
- Two Tickets to Paris (1961)
