= Hey, Let's Twist! =

1961 American musical film directed by Greg Garrison

- Theatrical release poster
- Directed by: Greg Garrison
- Screenplay by: Hal Hackady
- Produced by: Martha Vera Romm
- Starring: Joey Dee; Jo Ann Campbell; Teddy Randazzo; Kay Armen; Zohra Lampert; Dino Di Luca
- Cinematography: George Jacobson
- Edited by: Arline Garson; Sidney Katz
- Music by: Henry Glover
- Production company: Harry Romm Productions
- Distributed by: Paramount Pictures
- Release date: December 31, 1961
- Running time: 79 minutes
- Country: United States
- Language: English
- Budget: $300,000
- Box office: $1 million (US/Canada)

Hey, Let's Twist! is a 1961 American musical film directed by Greg Garrison and starring Joey Dee, Jo Ann Campbell, Teddy Randazzo, Kay Armen, Zohra Lampert and Dino Di Luca. It was written by Hal Hackady and released on December 31, 1961, by Paramount Pictures.

== Plot ==
The story chronicles the rise, fall, and resurgence of the Peppermint Lounge club. The children of the owner almost ruin the club by updating the place but realize their error.

== Cast ==
- Joey Dee as himself
- Jo Ann Campbell as Piper
- Teddy Randazzo as Rickey Dee
- Kay Armen as Angie
- Zohra Lampert as Sharon
- Dino Di Luca as Papa
- Hope Hampton as herself
- Richard Dickens as Rore
- The Peppermint Loungers as themselves
- Joe Pesci as extra (uncredited) (his movie debut)
- Joseph Rigano as Vinnie (uncredited) (his movie debut)

== Production ==
The film shot for two weeks at Pathe Studios in New York. Filming started November 1961.

== Reception ==
The film performed well at the box office.

Variety wrote: "The finished product doesn't keep hidden the quickie nature of the 80-minute feature; producer Harry Romm evidently was in a frenzy to finish. But he has come up with an all right novelty – there are sufficient boxoffice good points – and it deserves serious consideration in the marketplaces ... Photography is barely adequate; a show of more flexibility would have helped nicely. Some of the group Twisting in Hey, Let's Twist shows about as much imagination as the afternoon dance sessions (with amateurs) on television."

The Monthly Film Bulletin wrote: "It would be too much to hope that any film so obviously and hastily tailored to exploit the new dance craze could actually achieve style as well as topicality. But by comparison with Twist Around The Clock ... this is positively a quality product. The use of the Peppermint Lounge location, where the Twist is said to have originated, is tidily woven into a story that, for all its trite sentimentality, at least works up some interest on its own account. While plugging the Twist fairly mercilessly, it also captures on the dance floor the excitement of the new beat, despite barely adequate photography which seems excessively preoccupied with shaking female posteriors. The acting is passable; and the magnificent-looking Zohra Lampert gives a performance as the predatory columnist outrageous enough to be thoroughly enjoyable."

Boxoffice wrote: "Harry Romm's hastily made (20 days shooting time) picture dealing with the phenomenal dance craze is highly exploitable fare which will attract the teenagers and their dance-mad elders and clean up while the Twist rage is at its height. Entirely filmed in Manhattan, it boasts Joey Dee and the Starliters, who brought nationwide fame to the Peppermint Lounge in Times Square, acceptable story by Hal Hackady, rather than a succession of song-and-dance acts, and some performers who can carry the plot capably, as well as Twist. Director Greg Garrison keeps the action lively."
