= Barbara Heller =

German classical composer and pianist

Barbara Heller (born 6 November 1936) is a German composer and pianist. She lives in Darmstadt, in the Odenwald and at times on the Canary Island of La Gomera.

== Biography ==
Barbara Heller was born in Ludwigshafen am Rhein. Her father Eugene Heller was a restorer of church art. After the parental home was bombed in 1943, the family moved to Hammelbach/Odenwald. In 1948 they returned to Ludwigshafen, in 1949 moved to Mannheim, then to Cologne and Darmstadt.

Barbara Heller studied music in Mannheim and Munich and graduated in 1957. Her first attempts at composition were in 1949, though self-taught. She studied composition with Hans Vogt and Harald Genzmer and film music for a short time in Siena. She received several scholarships to the Darmstädter Ferienkurse where she studied under Hermann Heiss and David Tudor, among others. From 1958 to 1962 she was a lecturer and piano teacher at the School of Music and Performing Arts in Mannheim.

In 1970 she established the "Hermann Heiss Archive, Darmstadt" from the estate of the composer, and continued to collect documents for the archive. In 1978 she participated in the construction of the Internationaler Arbeitskreis Frau und Musik (International Working Group on Women and Music) and served on the executive board until 1981. In 1980 she helped organize the first big festival on women and music in Bonn/Cologne. From 1986 to 1993, she served on the board of the Institut für Neue Musik und Musikerziehung Darmstadt (Institute for New Music and Music Education Darmstadt).

Until 1990 Heller continued to actively perform as a pianist. In 1991 she participated in the foundation of the group "Bluna Bluna" with Nicholas Heyduck and Michael Harenberg, which produces tape compositions, sound installations, audio-visual exhibition projects, and improvisations.

== Works ==
Barbara Heller has composed a large body of works, including works for piano, harpsichord, orchestra, chamber ensembles, and film scores.

== Discography ==
- Feminae in Musica (Feminae Records, 2007)
  - Lalai, Schlaflied zum Wachwerden?
    - Performed by: Aleksandra Maslovaric (violin) and Tania Fleischer (piano)
    - Available:
