= Kay Medford =

American actress (1916–1980)

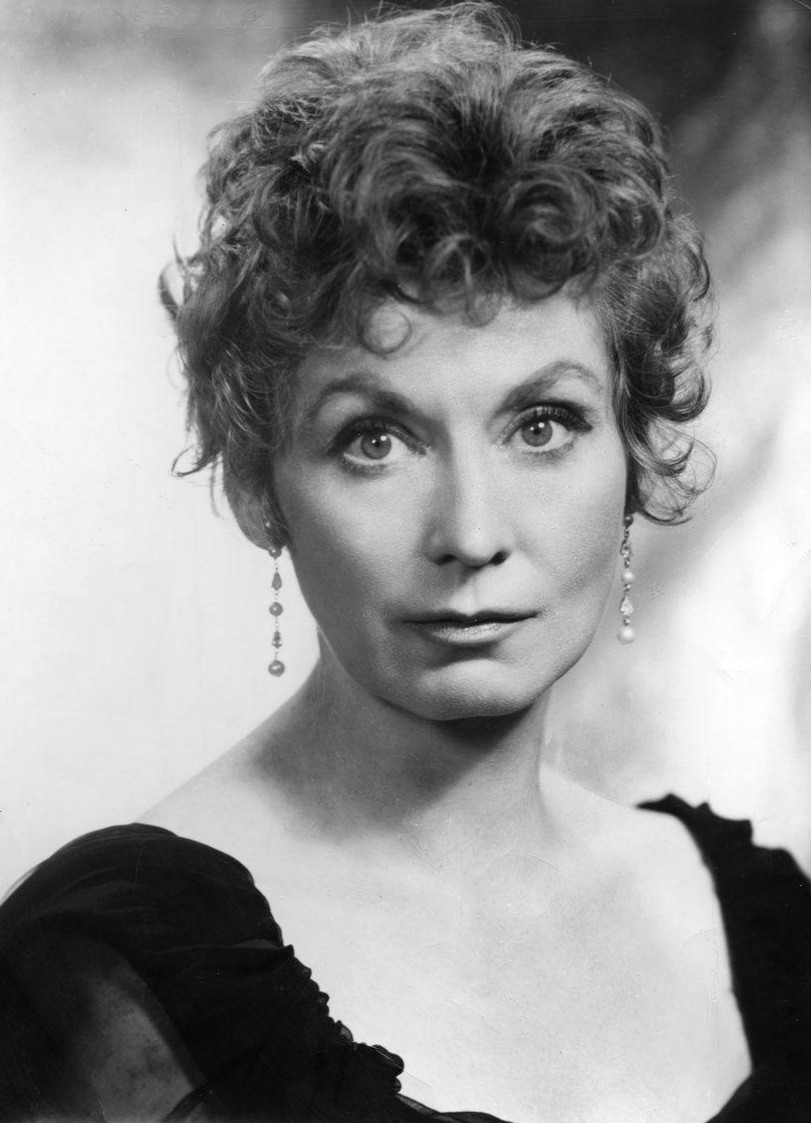
- Medford in 1963
- Born: Margaret Kathleen Regan; September 14, 1916; New York City, U.S.
- Died: April 10, 1980 (aged 63); New York City, U.S.
- Occupation: Actress
- Years active: 1942–1980

Margaret Kathleen Regan (September 14, 1916 – April 10, 1980), better known as Kay Medford, was an American actress and singer. For her performance as Rose Brice in the musical Funny Girl and the film adaptation of the same name, she was nominated for a Tony Award for Best Featured Actress in a Musical and an Academy Award for Best Supporting Actress respectively.

== Early years ==
Medford was born in 1916. Her mother had been an actress with a Shakespearean stock group in Connecticut. Orphaned in her teens, she adopted the name Kay Medford professionally, and began her career after graduating from high school and working as a nightclub waitress.

== Look magazine feature, 1942 ==
A multi-page portrait in the March 10, 1942, issue of Look magazine first brought her to national attention. While living a spartan existence in New York, looking for acting roles, she came to the attention of columnist Whitney Bolton (New York Morning Telegraph) and then his friend, MGM producer Mervyn LeRoy. After auditioning for LeRoy, he signed her to a personal contract and began her star-grooming, fitness, and weight-loss regimen in New York before she headed to Los Angeles.

== Career ==
Eventually adopting the name "Kay Medford", she began entertaining professionally by performing at summer resorts in the Catskill Mountains. In 1949, she toured with a nightclub routine in which she did impersonations of Hollywood celebrities. She was the original Mae Peterson (Albert's mother) in Bye Bye Birdie on Broadway, garnering excellent reviews. Medford appeared in the Warner Bros. rock and roll film, Jamboree (1957). She made her Broadway debut in 1951 in the musical Paint Your Wagon.

She was cast in Carousel, then appeared onstage in Funny Girl as the mother of Fanny Brice (played by Barbra Streisand); for this performance she was nominated for a 1964 Tony Award for Featured Actress (Musical), and when she repeated the role in the 1968 film adaptation, she was nominated for an Academy Award for Best Supporting Actress.

In the summer of 1970, she appeared at Denver's Elitch Theatre in Light Up the Sky, alongside Kitty Carlisle.

Her other film credits included roles in A Face in the Crowd (1957), The Rat Race (1960), BUtterfield 8 (1960), Girl of the Night (1960), Ensign Pulver (1964), A Fine Madness (1966), The Busy Body (1967), Angel in My Pocket (1969), Twinky (1969), But I Don't Want to Get Married! (1970), Fire Sale (1977), and Windows (1980).

On television, Medford portrayed Harriet Endicott on To Rome with Love, Gloria's mother on That's Life, and Maria's mother on On Our Own, and was a member of the cast of The Dean Martin Show. She also guest-starred on series, including Decoy, Marcus Welby, M.D.,The Partridge Family, and Barney Miller in her last screen performance in the episode 'Dietrich's Arrest' which originally aired March 6, 1980, one month before her death.

== Death ==
Medford never married and had no children. She died of cancer in New York City on April 10, 1980, at age 63.

== Partial filmography ==
- Maisie Gets Her Man (1942) as Woman in Audience (uncredited)
- The War Against Mrs. Hadley (1942) as Flossie (uncredited)
- Northwest Rangers (1943) as Girl in Casino (uncredited)
- Random Harvest (1943) as Wife (uncredited)
- Slightly Dangerous (1943) as Girl Getting Off Bus (uncredited)
- Three Hearts for Julia (1943) as Thelma (uncredited)
- Pilot No. 5 (1943) - Davis' Secretary (uncredited)
- Swing Shift Maisie (1943) as Ann Wilson
- Lost Angel (1943) as Telephone Operator (uncredited)
- Whistling in Brooklyn (1943) as Phone Operator (voice, uncredited)
- Rationing (1944) as Information Girl (uncredited)
- Broadway Rhythm (1944) as Cashier at Arcade (uncredited)
- Meet the People (1944) as Mrs. Smith (uncredited)
- An American Romance (1944) as Farmer's wife, Yulka (uncredited)
- Mrs. Parkington (1944) as Minnie (uncredited)
- The Picture of Dorian Gray (1945) as Girl (uncredited)
- Adventure (1945) as Red (uncredited)
- Tap Roots (1948) as Caller (uncredited)
- The Undercover Man (1949) as Gladys La Verne
- Guilty Bystander (1950) as Angel
- The Transporter (1950) as Anna Paperiska
- Mr. Walkie Talkie (1952) as Marge
- Singing in the Dark (1956) as Luli
- A Face in the Crowd (1957) as First Mrs. Rhodes
- Jamboree (1957) as Grace Show
- The Rat Race (1960) as Landlady Mrs. 'Soda' Gallo
- Butterfield 8 (1960) as Happy
- Girl of the Night (1960) as Rowena Claiborne
- Two Tickets to Paris (1962) as Aggie
- Ensign Pulver (1964) as Head Nurse
- A Fine Madness (1966) as Mrs. Fish
- The Busy Body (1967) as Ma Norton
- Funny Girl (1968) as Rose Brice
- Angel in My Pocket (1969) as Mother-in-law Rancine
- Lola (1970) as Scott's mother, Mrs. Wardman
- Fire Sale (1977) as Ruth Fikas
- Windows (1980) as Ida Marx
