= Jo Ann Campbell =

American rockabilly singer (born 1938)

- Born: July 20, 1938 (age 88); Jacksonville, Florida, United States
- Genres: rockabilly
- Occupation: Singer
- Instrument: Vocals
- Labels: RKO-Point Records, Eldorado Records
- Spouse: Troy Seals

Jo Ann Campbell (born July 20, 1938, in Jacksonville, Florida) is an American singer who was one of the pioneers of rockabilly.

== Biography ==
Campbell began attending music school at the age of four, and won many honors as a drum majorette at Fletcher High School. In 1954 she travelled Europe as a dancer, then moved to New York, where she joined the Johnny Conrad Dancers and made several television appearances on shows such as The Milton Berle Show and The Colgate Comedy Hour.

In 1956, Campbell decided to quit dancing and become a singer. She received her first recording contract with RKO-Point Records in New York and released her debut single "Where Ever You Go" / "I'm Coming Home Late Tonight" with them in 1956. It was unsuccessful and she then signed a recording contract with Eldorado Records after performing at Harlem's Apollo Theater. She wrote and released her second single, "Come On Baby" in 1957. Later that year she released "Wait a Minute", and appeared at the Brooklyn Paramount and on Dick Clark's American Bandstand show.

Campbell appeared in two films: Go, Johnny, Go (1959) and Hey, Let's Twist! (1962), while continuing to release records. In June 1961 she reached No. 41 in the UK Singles Chart with "Motorcycle Michael". She had her biggest hit in August 1962 with "I'm the Girl from Wolverton Mountain", an answer song to Claude King's "Wolverton Mountain". Some pressings showed the title as "(I'm the Girl on) Wolverton Mountain". The song reached No. 38 on the Billboard Hot 100 chart. Also in 1962, after Bobby Vinton released his hit, “Roses Are Red (My Love)”, Jo Ann released her song in reply, “Long As The Rose Is Red”. In April 1963, she followed up with "Mother, Please! (I'd Rather Do It Myself)", a take-off on an Anacin television commercial of the day, but this reached No. 88.

After marrying Atlantic Records record producer Troy Seals in 1964, Campbell left the music industry. Troy died in 2025.
