= List of The Tonight Show Starring Johnny Carson episodes (1970) =

- No. of episodes: 259

Release
- Original network: NBC

Season chronology
- ← Previous; 1969 episodes Next → 1971 episodes

This is a list of all The Tonight Show Starring Johnny Carson episodes that aired between January 1, 1970, and December 31, 1970. In October, 1962 Johnny Carson took over as host of the show from the previous host Jack Paar.

== 1970 ==
=== January ===
No.	Original release date	Guest(s)	Musical/entertainment guest(s)
1850	January 1, 1970	Jerry Orbach, Ace Trucking Company	June Valli,
1851	January 2, 1970	Corbett Monica (guest host)	Jerry Vale, Monet and Wells
1852	January 5, 1970	Andy Griffith, Harold Hughes	N/A
1853	January 6, 1970	Bob Dille	Tommy Leonetti
1854	January 7, 1970	TBA	Edmunds and Curly
1855	January 8, 1970	David Susskind, Charlie Manna	Marilyn Maye
1856	January 9, 1970	Joan Rivers (guest host), Pamela Mason. Rita Damitri, comedy team Deddy and Bill	N/A
1857	January 12, 1970	James Stewart, Hank Stram, Len Dawson	Roslyn Kind, The Carnival
1858	January 13, 1970	Charlie Callas, June Allyson, Bob and Ray	N/A
1859	January 14, 1970	Bob Hope, Willie Mays	N/A
1860	January 15, 1970	Jonathan Winters, Rodney Dangerfield	N/A
1861	January 16, 1970	Joan Rivers (guest host), Marty Allen, Mr. Kenneth	Al Hirt
1862	January 19, 1970	Alan King (guest host), Milt Kamen, Norm Crosby, Dr. Joyce Brothers	Judy Collins, Jane Morgan
1863	January 20, 1970	Alan King (guest host), Noel Harrison, Rod Laver, Pancho Gonzales	Tony Bennett
1864	January 21, 1970	Alan King (guest host), Peter Lind Hayes, Bob Dille	Roberta Flack
1865	January 22, 1970	Peter Lawford (guest host), Mamie Van Doren, Morton Hunt	N/A
1866	January 23, 1970	Peter Lawford (guest host), Suzanne Charny	N/A
1867	January 26, 1970	Joan Rivers (guest host), Robert Ryan, Jack Valenti, Phyllis Newman, Eleanor Perry	Thelma Houston
1868	January 27, 1970	Tony Randall, Jack Haley, Jr., Mamie Van Doren, Dr. David Reuben	Judy Collins
1869	January 28, 1970	David Susskind, William F. Buckley, Jr., Jeane Dixon	N/A
1870	January 29, 1970	George C. Scott, June Allyson	Lana Cantrell
1871	January 30, 1970	Tony Bennett, Marty Brill, Karen Wyman	Tony Bennett, Karen Wyman

=== February ===
No.	Original release date	Guest(s)	Musical/entertainment guest(s)
1872	February 2, 1970	TBA	N/A
1873	February 3, 1970	Maureen Stapleton, James Coco, Carol Wayne	N/A
1874	February 4, 1970	George Segal, Norm Crosby	Donna Theodore
1875	February 5, 1970	Karl Malden, Joe Frazier	N/A
1876	February 6, 1970	Joan Rivers (guest host), Alan Sues, Ann Corio, Marty Brill, Peggy Cass	Stiller and Meara
1877	February 9, 1970	Bob Newhart, Robert Lansing, Dr. Paul Ehrlich	Leslie Uggams
1878	February 10, 1970	Ross Perot	N/A
1879	February 11, 1970	Vincent Price, James Coco, Dr. David Reuben, Liza Minnelli	N/A
1880	February 12, 1970	Rodney Dangerfield, Jimmy Breslin	Buck Owens and the Buckaroos
1881	February 13, 1970	Joan Rivers (guest host)	N/A
1882	February 16, 1970	Jack Lemmon, Don Adams	Tiny Tim, Vikki Carr
1883	February 17, 1970	Jack Benny, Tony Curtis	N/A
1884	February 18, 1970	Hugh Hefner, Don Rickles, Carol Wayne, The Amazing Criswell, George Hamilton	N/A
1885	February 19, 1970	George Burns, Bob Newhart, Robert Blake, Bill Cosby	Connie Stevens
1886	February 20, 1970	George Gobel, Edgar Bergen	N/A
1887	February 23, 1970	Lucille Ball, Buddy Hackett	N/A
1888	February 24, 1970	Groucho Marx, Rose Marie, Ozzie Nelson, Harriet Nelson	N/A
1889	February 25, 1970	Mickey Rooney, Patty Duke	Della Reese
1890	February 26, 1970	Ernest Borgnine, Barbara Eden, George Raft	N/A
1891	February 27, 1970	Bob Hope, Dennis Weaver, Red Buttons, Billy de Wolfe	N/A

=== March ===
No.	Original release date	Guest(s)	Musical/entertainment guest(s)
1892	March 2, 1970	Joe Frazier, James Stewart	N/A
1893	March 3, 1970	Alan King, Stella Stevens, Hal Frazier	Bob & Ray
1894	March 4, 1970	Don Rickles, Lorne Greene, Telly Savalas	N/A
1895	March 5, 1970	James Coco, Corbett Monica	Roberta Flack
1896	March 6, 1970	Bill Cosby (guest host)	N/A
1897	March 9, 1970	David Steinberg, Jaye P. Morgan	Sergio Franchi
1898	March 10, 1970	TBA	N/A
1899	March 11, 1970	Peggy Cass	Al Hirt, Nancy Ames
1900	March 12, 1970	TBA	N/A
1901	March 13, 1970	Peter Lawford (guest host)	Cass Elliot, Cissy Houston, Monti Rock
1902	March 16, 1970	Alan King (guest host), Molly Picon, Jerry Shane	Lola Falana
1903	March 17, 1970	Alan King (guest host), Rich Little, Laura Greene, Robert Strauss	Harry Belafonte
1904	March 18, 1970	Alan King (guest host), Marian Mercer, Hal Frazier	N/A
1905	March 19, 1970	Art Linkletter (guest host), Florence Henderson, Herb Klein	N/A
1906	March 20, 1970	Peter Lawford (guest host), Soupy Sales	Cissy Houston
1907	March 23, 1970	TBA	Dana Valery, Richie Havens
1908	March 24, 1970	Orson Bean	Cissy Houston, Bob & Ray
1909	March 25, 1970	Tony Randall, Cliff Robertson, Jack Haley, Jr.	N/A
1910	March 26, 1970	Graham Kerr	Sandler & Young, Melba Moore
1911	March 27, 1970	Rodney Dangerfield, James Coco	O.C. Smith
1912	March 30, 1970	Charlie Manna	N/A
1913	March 31, 1970	Peter Hurkos, Penny Fuller, Phil Foster	N/A

=== April ===
No.	Original release date	Guest(s)	Musical/entertainment guest(s)
1914	April 1, 1970	Dr. Robert Baird	N/A
1915	April 2, 1970	TBA	N/A
1916	April 3, 1970	Flip Wilson (guest host)	Bernadette Peters, Louis Armstrong
1917	April 6, 1970	Robert Townsend	Buddy Rich, Hines, Hines and Dad
1918	April 7, 1970	TBA	Peggy Lee, Homer & Jethro
1919	April 8, 1970	Bob Uecker, Barbara Anderson, David Steinberg, Johnny Brown	Erroll Garner, Peggy Lee
1920	April 9, 1970	Bob Uecker, Sylvia Miles, Philip Villar (Tiddlywinks champion)	Donna Theodore
1921	April 10, 1970	Flip Wilson (guest host), Dody Goodman	Cass Elliot, George Benson
1922	April 13, 1970	Lauren Bacall, Shirley Booth	Dana Valery
1923	April 14, 1970	Agnes Moorehead, David Susskind, Patty Roosevelt	Melba Moore, Ace Trucking Company
1924	April 15, 1970	Jack Klugman, Judy Carne, Rodney Dangerfield	N/A
1925	April 16, 1970	Dr. Paul Ehrlich, Marcel Marceau	Glen Campbell
1926	April 17, 1970	TBA	N/A
1927	April 20, 1970	Flip Wilson (guest host), Rich Little, James Coco	Joe Williams, Nancy Ames
1928	April 21, 1970	Flip Wilson (guest host), Joe Frazier, Betty Walker	Melba Moore, Monti Rock
1929	April 22, 1970	Flip Wilson (guest host)	Lovelace Watkins, The Four Tops
1930	April 23, 1970	Flip Wilson (guest host), Louis Nye	The Three Degrees
1931	April 24, 1970	Flip Wilson (guest host), Tony Curtis, Cleavon Little, Irwin C. Watson	Helen Reddy, Modern Jazz Quartet
1932	April 27, 1970	Flip Wilson (guest host), Mario Andretti, Virginia Graham	Jerry Butler, Laura Lee, The Dells, The Tony Williams Lifetime
1933	April 28, 1970	Flip Wilson (guest host)	Kim Weston
1934	April 29, 1970	Flip Wilson (guest host), Ruby Keeler, Dody Goodman	Joe Simon, Dionne Warwick
1935	April 30, 1970	Flip Wilson (guest host)	N/A

=== May ===
No.	Original release date	Guest(s)	Musical/entertainment guest(s)
1936	May 1, 1970	Mayor John Lindsay, Dr. Benjamin Spock	Dana Valery, Tiny Tim
1937	May 4, 1970	Charlie Callas, Tony Randall, Gore Vidal	Peter Nero
1938	May 5, 1970	Francis Gary Powers, David Steinberg, Kenneth Nelson	Tammy Grimes
1939	May 6, 1970	Jack Benny, Roberta Peters, Argosy editor Milton Machlin	N/A
1940	May 7, 1970	Lord Charles Spencer Churchill, nephew of Sir Winston Churchill (and other guests), Bill Fiore	Rita Moreno
1941	May 8, 1970	Dr. Robert Menninger	Melba Moore
1942	May 11, 1970	Jack Lemmon, Dr. Alvin Novick, Virginia Vestoff, Neil Simon	N/A
1943	May 12, 1970	Barbara Anderson, Orson Bean	Marilyn Maye
1944	May 13, 1970	Beau Bridges	Kaye Stevens
1945	May 14, 1970	Shelley Winters, James Coco, Cliff Gorman	Donna Theodore
1946	May 15, 1970	Joan Rivers	N/A
1947	May 18, 1970	Peter Hurkos, Sylvia Parker	Tiny Tim, Vikki Carr
1948	May 19, 1970	Gig Young, Billy de Wolfe	N/A
1949	May 20, 1970	Buddy Hackett, Billy de Wolfe, Alan King, Claudia Jennings	N/A
1950	May 21, 1970	TBA	N/A
1951	May 22, 1970	Vikki Carr (guest host), Danny Kaye, Sandy Baron, David Winters, Joe Kapp	N/A
1952	May 25, 1970	Tom Seaver	Della Reese
1953	May 26, 1970	Michael Caine, Marian Mercer, Dr. David Reuben	Little Richard
1954	May 27, 1970	Virginia Vestoff, Charlie Callas, Alan King, Sander Vanocur	N/A
1955	May 28, 1970	David Smith	Kim Weston, Melba Moore, Shocking Blue
1956	May 29, 1970	Della Reese (guest host)	N/A

=== June ===
No.	Original release date	Guest(s)	Musical/entertainment guest(s)
1957	June 1, 1970	Tony Randall	N/A
1958	June 2, 1970	David Susskind	B.B. King, June Valli, Louis Armstrong
1959	June 3, 1970	Crew of Apollo 13: Jim Lovell, Fred Haise, Jack Swigert	N/A
1960	June 4, 1970	Truman Capote, Lynn Kellogg, Herbert Philbrick	Stiller and Meara
1961	June 5, 1970	Corbett Monica (guest host), Dick Shawn, Jim Fowler	Eydie Gorme, The Three Degrees
1962	June 8, 1970	Lily Tomlin	Gloria Loring, Hines, Hines, and Dad
1963	June 9, 1970	David Steinberg, Fran Allison, Burr Tillstrom	Dana Valery, Gary Puckett
1964	June 10, 1970	Danny Thomas	Ray Stevens, Ace Trucking Company
1965	June 11, 1970	James Coco, Jo Ann Pflug, Dick Gregory	N/A
1966	June 12, 1970	David Steinberg (guest host), Elliott Gould, Gene Wilder	N/A
1967	June 15, 1970	Red Buttons, Herbert Philbrick	Buddy Rich, Sarah Vaughan
1968	June 16, 1970	James Coco, Phyllis Diller, Vic Perry	Trini Lopez
1969	June 17, 1970	Zsa Zsa Gabor, Michael Constantine	Phyllis Newman
1970	June 18, 1970	Rodney Dangerfield, Jaye P. Morgan, Martin Rackin, Shari Lewis, Diahn Williams	N/A
1971	June 19, 1970	Peter Lawford (guest host), Carol Lawrence, Vic Perry	Cass Elliot, Sandler & Young
1972	June 22, 1970	Jerry Lewis (guest host), Louis Nye	N/A
1973	June 23, 1970	Jerry Lewis (guest host), Dino De Laurentiis, Jan Murray, Jose Greco	Marsh & Adams
1974	June 24, 1970	Jerry Lewis (guest host), Henny Youngman	N/A
1975	June 25, 1970	Jerry Lewis (guest host), Clement Freud, Sidney Miller, Steve Franken, Ossie Davis, Jan Murray	Connie Stevens, Merry Clayton
1976	June 26, 1970	Jerry Lewis (guest host), Charles Nelson Reilly, Dame Judith Anderson	Mac Davis
1977	June 29, 1970	Jerry Lewis (guest host), Forrest Tucker, Mickey Rooney	Esther Phillips
1978	June 30, 1970	Jerry Lewis (guest host), Bob Hope, Marty Brill, Judith Lowry, Jacqueline Susann	Abbe Lane, Buddy Rich

=== July ===
No.	Original release date	Guest(s)	Musical/entertainment guest(s)
1979	July 1, 1970	Jerry Lewis (guest host), Clement Freud	Lesley Gore, Monti Rock
1980	July 2, 1970	Jerry Lewis (guest host), Joe Garagiola, Dr. Leonard Kurland	Della Reese
1981	July 3, 1970	Jerry Lewis (guest host), Dr. Joyce Brothers	Della Reese, Irving Fields, Melba Moore
1982	July 6, 1970	Bob Hope, Lily Tomlin	B.J. Thomas
1983	July 7, 1970	Zsa Zsa Gabor, Robert Klein, Otto Preminger	Freda Payne
1984	July 8, 1970	Shelley Winters, James Coco, Erich Segal	Ace Trucking Company
1985	July 9, 1970	Myron Cohen, Otto Preminger, Dick Shawn	Ike & Tina Turner
1986	July 10, 1970	Della Reese (guest host), Peter Lawford, Rich Little, Noel Harrison, Pamela Mason	Sarah Vaughan
1987	July 13, 1970	TBA	Donna Theodore
1988	July 14, 1970	Charles Nelson Reilly, Graham Kerr	Mahalia Jackson, Phyllis Newman
1989	July 15, 1970	TBA	N/A
1990	July 16, 1970	Truman Capote, Mitzi Gaynor	Sergio Franchi
1991	July 17, 1970	Arnold Palmer (guest host), Spiro Agnew, Rod Laver	Vic Damone
1992	July 20, 1970	Rodney Dangerfield	Lana Cantrell
1993	July 21, 1970	Joan Rivers, Lynn Kellogg	N/A
1994	July 22, 1970	Anthony Perkins, Jaye P. Morgan, Irwin C. Watson	N/A
1995	July 23, 1970	Jim Fowler, Jackie Bright, Marvin Kitman	Melba Moore, Monti Rock
1996	July 24, 1970	Vikki Carr (guest host)	N/A
1997	July 27, 1970	James Coco, Judith Lowry, Marty Brill	Helen O'Connell
1998	July 28, 1970	Zsa Zsa Gabor, Lee Trevino, Elaine Stritch, Alan King	Helen Reddy
1999	July 29, 1970	Willie Mays, Joe Garagiola, Lee Meredith, Carol Wayne	Helen Reddy
2000	July 30, 1970	Paul Harvey	N/A
2001	July 31, 1970	Della Reese (guest host), Cleavon Little, Rex Reed, Jack LaLanne	Richie Havens

=== August ===
No.	Original release date	Guest(s)	Musical/entertainment guest(s)
2002	August 3, 1970	Gene Wilder, Erich Segal	N/A
2003	August 4, 1970	Steve Allen, Rodney Dangerfield, Dr. David Reuben	N/A
2004	August 5, 1970	Peter Boyle	N/A
2005	August 6, 1970	Warren Mauley, Elaine Stritch	N/A
2006	August 7, 1970	Bob Newhart (guest host), Danny Kuchinski	N/A
2007	August 10, 1970	Corbett Monica (guest host), Judy Carne	N/A
2008	August 11, 1970	Sen. Charles Percy, Ron Carey	N/A
2009	August 12, 1970	Kreskin	Bette Midler
2010	August 13, 1970	Buddy Hackett, Dr. Paul Ehrlich (author)	N/A
2011	August 14, 1970	Dr. Paul Ehrlich, Lada Edmund, Jr., Ben J. Wattenberg	Aretha Franklin
2012	August 17, 1970	Joan Rivers (guest host), Debbie Reynolds, Milt Kamen, Dr. Lendon Smith	Edie Adams, Peter Allen
2013	August 18, 1970	Joan Rivers (guest host), Minnie Pearl	Donna Theodore, Peter Marshall
2014	August 19, 1970	Joan Rivers (guest host), Charles Nelson Reilly, Jacqueline Susann, Shirley Eder, Ron Carey.	Tiny Tim
2015	August 20, 1970	Joan Rivers (guest host), James Coco, Gore Vidal	Sons of Dawn
2016	August 21, 1970	Joan Rivers (guest host), Marty Brill, Rip Taylor, Michael Dunn, Jeane Dixon, Peter White	Freda Payne, Mac Davis
2017	August 24, 1970	David Steinberg (guest host), Mr. Blackwell, Carol Wayne	N/A
2018	August 25, 1970	Phyllis Diller (guest host), Jerry Hartwell	N/A
2019	August 26, 1970	Della Reese (guest host), Pat Morita, Jim Fowler	Billy Daniels
2020	August 27, 1970	David Steinberg (guest host), Paul Williams, Rex Reed	Cass Elliot, John Phillips
2021	August 28, 1970	Della Reese (guest host), Soupy Sales	Melba Moore
2022	August 31, 1970	Red Buttons	Bette Midler

=== September ===
No.	Original release date	Guest(s)	Musical/entertainment guest(s)
2023	September 1, 1970	Elaine Stritch, Jackie Vernon, Jaye P. Morgan, Wes Stern	N/A
2024	September 2, 1970	Warren Mauley	N/A
2025	September 3, 1970	Alvin Toffler, Wes Stern	N/A
2026	September 4, 1970	Zsa Zsa Gabor, Jerry Lewis, Norman Wisdom, Joe Garagiola	Carla Thomas
2027	September 7, 1970	Kreskin	Skiles and Henderson
2028	September 8, 1970	James Whitmore, Charlie Callas	Julie Budd
2029	September 9, 1970	Joel Grey	Bernadette Peters, Ethel Merman
2030	September 10, 1970	Rich Little, Maximilian Schell, Dick Shawn, Frank Sinatra	N/A
2031	September 11, 1970	Don Rickles, Dr. Lendon Smith, Jacqueline Susann, DuVal and Trina	Randy Newman, Little Richard
2032	September 14, 1970	Milton Berle, Don Rickles, Alan King, Anthony Perkins, Dody Goodman	N/A
2033	September 15, 1970	George Kirby, Cy Howard	Dana Valery
2034	September 16, 1970	Totie Fields, Madeleine Collinson, Mary Collinson	Jose Molina, Don Cherry
2035	September 17, 1970	James Coco, Sen. Mike Gravel, Gloria Vanderbilt	Phyllis Newman
2036	September 18, 1970	James Coco	The Carpenters
2037	September 21, 1970	Jerry Lewis (guest host)	Marilyn Maye
2038	September 22, 1970	Jerry Lewis (guest host), Jacqueline Susann	N/A
2039	September 23, 1970	Jerry Lewis (guest host), Jimmy Breslin	Pat Boone
2040	September 24, 1970	Jerry Lewis (guest host)	Eloise Laws
2041	September 25, 1970	Jerry Lewis (guest host), Mr. Blackwell	Esther Phillips
2042	September 28, 1970	Joan Rivers (guest host), Dr. Irwin Maxwell Stillman	N/A
2043	September 29, 1970	Joan Rivers, Cliff Gorman, Helen Hayes, Pamela Mason	Melba Moore, Ronnie Dyson, Bob & Ray
2044	September 30, 1970	Gore Vidal, Jaye P. Morgan	Jose Feliciano

=== October ===
No.	Original release date	Guest(s)	Musical/entertainment guest(s)
2045	October 1, 1970	Paula Prentiss, Dean Martin, Don Rickles, Charlton Heston, Sammy Davis, Jr., Jack Webb, Ed Ames, Bob Hope, George Gobel	N/A
8th Anniversary Show
2046	October 2, 1970	Carol Wayne, Rodney Dangerfield, Shelley Winters	Buddy Greco
2047	October 5, 1970	Cass Elliot (guest host), Lee Marvin, Peter Lawford, Dr. Irwin Maxwell Stillman, Jeanne Moreau, Amanda Ambrose	Dave Mason
2048	October 6, 1970	Carol Channing, James Whitmore, Sandy Baron	Bette Midler
2049	October 7, 1970	Maurice Chevalier, Jacqueline Susann, Brian Kelly, Charlie Manna	N/A
2050	October 8, 1970	Pat Morita, Albert Almoznino, Charlie Manna, Dick Shawn	Phyllis Newman
2051	October 9, 1970	Kaye Hart, Ron Carey, Cliff Gorman	N/A
2052	October 12, 1970	Sammy Davis, Jr. (guest host), Jerry Lewis, Suzanne Charny	Aretha Franklin, Gene Chandler
2053	October 13, 1970	David Steinberg, Janos Prohaska, Jerry Lewis, Allan Blye, Melanie Henderson	Buddy Rich
2054	October 14, 1970	Bob Uecker	Little Richard, Ace Trucking Company
2055	October 15, 1970	Marilyn Michaels, Johnny Valente	Charles Aznavour, George Barnes and Bucky Pizzarelli
2056	October 16, 1970	Robert Mitchum, Mary Travers	Shirley Bassey, Bob & Ray
2057	October 19, 1970	Ruth Gordon, George Segal, Carl Reiner, Frank Robinson	Cass Elliot, Mac Davis
2058	October 20, 1970	John V. Lindsay, London Lee	The 5th Dimension, Carolyn Daye
2059	October 21, 1970	Lenny Schultz, Dr. Irwin Maxwell Stillman	Phyllis Newman
2060	October 22, 1970	James Coco, Marty Brill, Richard Harris	Rita Moreno, Woody Herman
2061	October 23, 1970	Barbara Walters, Myron Cohen	Erroll Garner
2062	October 26, 1970	Bob Newhart (guest host), Gig Young, Elaine Stritch, Ricky Jay, Rex Reed	Dana Valery
2063	October 27, 1970	Bob Newhart, Mel Brooks, Truman Capote	Nancy Ames
2064	October 28, 1970	Shari Lewis, Mr. Blackwell, David Frye	N/A
2065	October 29, 1970	Muhammad Ali, Bill Cosby, Kreskin, Louise Huebner	Harlem Globetrotters
2066	October 30, 1970	Bill Cosby (guest host)	Mac Davis, Miles Davis

=== November ===
No.	Original release date	Guest(s)	Musical/entertainment guest(s)
2067	November 2, 1970	Tony Randall	N/A
(11/3/70 pre-empted for NBC News mid-term election night coverage)
2068	November 4, 1970	Phyllis Diller, Clement Freud, Lenny Schultz	Lana Cantrell
2069	November 5, 1970	Richard Chamberlain	N/A
2070	November 6, 1970	Rodney Dangerfield, Jack Klugman, Dr. Leopold Bellak	Malcolm Roberts
2071	November 9, 1970	Joe Namath (guest host), Phyllis George	N/A
2072	November 10, 1970	Burt Bacharach (guest host), Bill Shoemaker	Dizzy Gillespie, James Brown, Mac Davis, Melba Moore
2073	November 11, 1970	Danny Thomas, Marlo Thomas, James Brolin, Carol Burnett	Glen Campbell
2074	November 12, 1970	Don Rickles, Lily Tomlin, Dick Shawn	Vikki Carr
2075	November 13, 1970	Gig Young, Carol Wayne	The Carpenters
2076	November 16, 1970	Lucille Ball, Doug McClure, Alan Sues	Della Reese, Roger Miller
2077	November 17, 1970	Goldie Hawn, Jaye P. Morgan, Alex Karras, Carrie Snodgress	N/A
2078	November 18, 1970	Walter Matthau, Billy de Wolfe	N/A
2079	November 19, 1970	Dan Rowan, Dick Martin, Judy Carne, George Gobel	N/A
2080	November 20, 1970	Charles Nelson Reilly, George Burns	N/A
2081	November 23, 1970	Paul Newman, Buddy Hackett, Rose Marie	N/A
2082	November 24, 1970	Bob Hope, Jack Lemmon, George Carlin	Lulu
2083	November 25, 1970	James Stewart, Peter Lawford	Ike & Tina Turner
2084	November 26, 1970	Flip Wilson	N/A
2085	November 27, 1970	Gov. Ronald Reagan, Flip Wilson, David Steinberg	Cass Elliot
2086	November 30, 1970	Jerry Lewis (guest host), James Coco, Trevor Howard, London Lee	Della Reese, Peter Nero

=== December ===
No.	Original release date	Guest(s)	Musical/entertainment guest(s)
2087	December 1, 1970	Jerry Lewis (guest host), Henry Gibson, Jimmy Breslin	N/A
2088	December 2, 1970	Jerry Lewis (guest host), Muhammad Ali, Suzanne Charny, Rex Reed	Sandler & Young
2089	December 3, 1970	Jerry Lewis (guest host), Sandy Baron	N/A
2090	December 4, 1970	Jerry Lewis (guest host), Corbett Monica	N/A
2091	December 7, 1970	Jerry Lewis (guest host), John Cassavetes	Phyllis Newman
2092	December 8, 1970	Joan Rivers, Clement Freud, John Byner	Hines, Hines and Dad
2093	December 9, 1970	Albert Brooks, Otto Preminger, William Redfield, Donna Theodore	N/A
2094	December 10, 1970	James Coco, David Steinberg, Rev. Ellwood Kieser	Bette Midler
2095	December 11, 1970	Rodney Dangerfield	N/A
2096	December 14, 1970	Dick Shawn (guest host), Elaine Stritch, Erich Segal	Bernadette Peters
2097	December 15, 1970	David Frost, Alan King, Derek Sanderson	Buddy Greco
2098	December 16, 1970	Dick Shawn, Kreskin	Bette Midler
2099	December 17, 1970	Elliott Gould, Nancy Grigor, Bob Kaufman	Dick Jensen, Lana Cantrell
2100	December 18, 1970	Tony Randall, Robert Klein, Angel Tompkins	Richie Havens
2101	December 21, 1970	Jerry Lewis (guest host), Richard Boone, Larry Best, Dr. Leopold Bellak	Enzo Stuarti, Monti Rock
2102	December 22, 1970	Jerry Lewis (guest host)	N/A
2103	December 23, 1970	Jerry Lewis (guest host)	Helen O'Connell
2104	December 25, 1970	Jerry Lewis (guest host), Jose Greco, Ashley Montagu	Tiny Tim
2105	December 28, 1970	Eli Wallach, Anne Jackson	N/A
2106	December 29, 1970	Joe Frazier, Julius Sumner Miller, Kenneth Nelson, Roz Kelly	Los Indios Tabajaras
2107	December 30, 1970	Dustin Hoffman, Heywood Hale Broun	Mac Davis
2108	December 31, 1970	James Coco, Maureen Stapleton, Mary Harper	Ronnie Dyson
