= List of The Tonight Show Starring Johnny Carson episodes (1969) =

- No. of episodes: 259

Release
- Original network: NBC

Season chronology
- ← Previous; 1968 episodes Next → 1970 episodes

The following is a list of episodes of the television series The Tonight Show Starring Johnny Carson which aired in 1969. In October, 1962 Johnny Carson took over as host of the show from the previous host Jack Paar.

== 1969 ==
=== January ===
No.	Original release date	Guest(s)	Musical/entertainment guest(s)
1592	January 1, 1969	Godfrey Cambridge, Pat McCormick, Alejandro Rey	N/A
1593	January 2, 1969	Flip Wilson, David Susskind, Parker Fennelly	N/A
1594	January 3, 1969	James Garner, Charlie Callas	Pearl Bailey
1595	January 6, 1969	Joan Rivers (guest host), Marty Allen, Phyllis Newman	N/A
1596	January 7, 1969	Irwin Corey, The Amin Brothers (Egyptian acrobatic balancing act)	Biff Rose
1597	January 8, 1969	Stan Freberg, Jean-Paul Vignon	N/A
1598	January 9, 1969	Jack E. Leonard	N/A
1599	January 10, 1969	Vaughn Monroe, Jose Greco	The Romano Brothers
1600	January 13, 1969	Shelley Berman	Newport Jazz Festival All-Stars: George Wein, Red Norvo, George Lamond, Ruby Braff, Larry Ridley, Luba Lisa
Durwood Kirby replaces Ed McMahon for the first of three nights so that McMahon could work as co-producer of the presidential inaugural gala.
1601	January 14, 1969	New York City mayor John Lindsay, Britt Eklund, Linda Bennett	Tommy Leonetti
1602	January 15, 1969	TBA	Lana Cantrell
1603	January 16, 1969	Harry Belafonte, Britt Eklund	Andre Previn, The Craig Hundley Trio
1604	January 17, 1969	Dick Cavett (guest host), Otto Preminger, Alan Burke	N/A
January 20 Tonight Show was preempted by NBC coverage of the Presidential Inaugural Ball
1605	January 21, 1969	Peter Lawford (guest host), Gina Lollobrigida, Rich Little, Milt Kamen	Ted Neely
1606	January 22, 1969	Buddy Rich	Sandler & Young
1607	January 23, 1969	TBA	Bobby Vinton, The Tamba Four
1608	January 24, 1969	David Susskind, Yvette Mimieux	Marilyn Maye, Homer and Jethro
1609	January 27, 1969	Alan King (guest host), Donald Pleasence, Bishop Shane Ajamian	Georgia Gibbs
Durwood Kirby handled announcing duties for the week in place of vacationing Ed McMahon
1610	January 28, 1969	John Davidson, etiquette expert Elizabeth Post	Eydie Gorme
1611	January 29, 1969	Shari Lewis, Shelley Berman, Gloria LeRoy	U.S. Naval Air Training Command choir, Cole and Param
1612	January 30, 1969	Dance team Bud and Cece Robinson	N/A
A laser beam demonstration is presented.
1613	January 31, 1969	Steve Lawrence, Roman Polanski, Topol	N/A

=== February ===
No.	Original release date	Guest(s)	Musical/entertainment guest(s)
1614	February 3, 1969	Flip Wilson (guest host), Elke Sommer, boxer Harlan Marbley	Biff Rose
1615	February 4, 1969	Flip Wilson (guest host), Redd Foxx, Vince Edwards, Bob Gibson, Tina Louise	Peter Lind Hayes
1616	February 5, 1969	Flip Wilson (guest host), Don Francks, Phil Foster, Linda Lavin	N/A
1617	February 6, 1969	Flip Wilson (guest host), Bob & Ray	B.B. King, Jackie and Roy
1618	February 7, 1969	Flip Wilson (guest host), Lara Parker, soul food expert Sanford Wolf, John Fisher	The Staple Singers, Monti Rock
1619	February 10, 1969	John Davidson (guest host)	Erroll Garner, Lana Cantrell
1620	February 11, 1969	Jack Benny, New York City ballet director George Balanchine and dancers Suzanne Farrell and Arthur Mitchell, Frank Buxton	N/A
1621	February 12, 1969	Anita Douval, surfer Rodney Sumpter	Blood Sweat and Tears, O.C. Smith, Paula Kelly
1622	February 13, 1969	David Susskind, Chita Rivera, Kitty Falger	Ray Price
1623	February 14, 1969	Orson Bean (guest host), Paul Krassner, Ronnie Dyson	N/A
1624	February 17, 1969	(FROM LOS ANGELES) Sammy Davis Jr., Carol Wayne, the cast of Laugh-In	N/A
1625	February 18, 1969	(FROM LOS ANGELES) Don Adams, Richard Harris, Buddy Rogers, Kaye Ballard	N/A
1626	February 19, 1969	(FROM LOS ANGELES) Kirk Douglas, The Smothers Brothers, John Byner	Craig Hundley
1627	February 20, 1969	(FROM LOS ANGELES) Stan Freberg, Sharon Tate, Jana Mason, Dave Barry	Tiny Tim
1628	February 21, 1969	(FROM LOS ANGELES) Bob Hope, Dean Martin, George Gobel, Judy Carne, Robert Wagner	N/A
1629	February 24, 1969	(FROM LOS ANGELES) Raquel Welch, Jack Carter, Frank Sutton	Vic Damone
1630	February 25, 1969	(FROM LOS ANGELES) Jerry Lewis, James Garner	N/A
1631	February 26, 1969	(FROM LOS ANGELES) Bob Newhart, Dean Jones, Billy de Wolfe	Roslyn Kind
1632	February 27, 1969	(FROM LOS ANGELES) George Burns, Mickey Rooney, Mark Wilson	N/A
1633	February 28, 1969	(FROM LOS ANGELES) Tony Curtis, Barbara McNair, Carl Reiner, Jill St. John	N/A

=== March ===
No.	Original release date	Guest(s)	Musical/entertainment guest(s)
1634	March 3, 1969	Charlie Callas	N/A
1635	March 4, 1969	Peter Ustinov	Robert Goulet
1636	March 5, 1969	Tony Randall, Garry Moore, Gloria Loring	Sandler and Young
1637	March 6, 1969	Bob Hope, Dean Martin, Buddy Rich, Carol Wayne, George Gobel, Judy Carne	Biff Rose, Don Ho
Sketch- "Black Shield of Fromen"
1638	March 7, 1969	Woody Allen	N/A
1639	March 10, 1969	Bob Crane, Maximilian Schell	N/A
1640	March 11, 1969	Dick Cavett, Al Freeman Jr.	Anthony Newley, Paula Kelly
1641	March 12, 1969	Buddy Hackett, Robert Montgomery	Jimmie Rodgers
Montgomery's reference to television station WBBM was bleeped out.
1642	March 13, 1969	Jack E. Leonard	N/A
A report on the splashdown of Apollo 9 was shown during the program.
1643	March 14, 1969	Peter Lawford (guest host)	Nancy Ames
1644	March 17, 1969	Bill Cosby (guest host), Allan Sherman, Jim Brown, Satchel Paige	Vikki Carr
1645	March 18, 1969	Bill Cosby (guest host), James Earl Jones, Artie Shaw	Diana Ross & The Supremes, Rhetta Hughes
1646	March 19, 1969	Bill Cosby (guest host), Gloria Steinem, Willie Tyler, Robert Hooks	N/A
1647	March 20, 1969	Bill Cosby (guest host), Julian Bond, Heywood Hale Broun	Tom Paxton
1648	March 21, 1969	Bill Cosby (guest host), Hal Holbrook	Roslyn Kind, Bola Sete
1649	March 24, 1969	Jerry Lewis (guest host), Robert Morse, Phil Foster, Stiller and Meara	Monti Rock
Lewis would apologize the next night for a joke that involved using the bathroom while flying over Mississippi.
1650	March 25, 1969	Jerry Lewis (guest host), Charlie Callas, George Carlin	Mason Williams, Patrice Munsel
1651	March 26, 1969	Jerry Lewis (guest host), Sally Ann Howes, London Lee, ski instructor Kitty Falger	N/A
1652	March 27, 1969	Jerry Lewis (guest host), Lynn Redgrave, Gore Vidal, Anita Gillette, Guy Marks	Honey Ltd.
1653	March 28, 1969	Jerry Lewis (guest host), Charlie Callas, Peter Lawford, Buddy Rich, Herschel Bernardi, Ina Balin	N/A
1654	March 31, 1969	Dick Cavett, Glenn Ford	Max Morath, Saki Tumi

=== April ===
No.	Original release date	Guest(s)	Musical/entertainment guest(s)
1655	April 1, 1969	Louisa Moritz	Marilyn Maye
1656	April 2, 1969	TBA	The New Zealand Trading Company
1657	April 3, 1969	Oscar de la Renta, Dr. Robert Baird	N/A
1658	April 4, 1969	Neil Simon, Jack Lemmon, Sandy Dennis	N/A
1659	April 7, 1969	Alan King (guest host), Dick Shawn	N/A
1660	April 8, 1969	David Susskind	Sergio Franchi
1661	April 9, 1969	Dick Cavett, Kenneth Tynan, Michael Grando	Nancy Wilson
1662	April 10, 1969	Dinah Shore, Allen Bruce	N/A
1663	April 11, 1969	Tony Randall, Beatrice Lillie	Gerry Mulligan
1664	April 14, 1969	Ted Williams, Rodney Dangerfield, Jack LaLanne	N/A
1665	April 15, 1969	Victor Buono, Steve Brandt	Peggy Lee
1666	April 16, 1969	George Jessel	N/A
1667	April 17, 1969	Beatrice Lillie, Shecky Greene, Bob & Ray	Leslie Uggams
1668	April 18, 1969	Joan Rivers (guest host), Soupy Sales, Gwen Verdon, Elizabeth Post	Anthony Newley
1669	April 21, 1969	Vice President Spiro Agnew, Phyllis Diller, Ali MacGraw, Leonard Spigelgass	Just Us
1670	April 22, 1969	Bud Collyer, William Redfield, Marian Mercer, Frank Buxton	N/A
1671	April 23, 1969	Norman Mailer, Corbett Monica, Senta Berger, magician Milbourne Christopher	The Treniers
1672	April 24, 1969	Oleg Cassini, Donna McKechnie, Tom Wicker, Ronnie David	N/A
1673	April 25, 1969	Alan King (guest host), Garry Moore, Heywood Hale Broun, Savario Seridis	N/A
1674	April 28, 1969	Connie Stevens, Zack Norman	N/A
Durwood Kirby served as the show's announcer for the week, in place of vacationing Ed McMahon
1675	April 29, 1969	Don Rickles, Victor Borge	Just Us
1676	April 30, 1969	Allen Funt, Mamie Van Doren	Sergio Franchi

=== May ===
No.	Original release date	Guest(s)	Musical/entertainment guest(s)
1677	May 1, 1969	Rodney Dangerfield, Ronnie David	N/A
1678	May 2, 1969	Shari Lewis, Sander Vanocur, The Ace Trucking Company	Biff Rose
1679	May 5, 1969	Peter Lawford (guest host), Jack Lemmon, Stiller and Meara, Peter Nero	N/A
1680	May 6, 1969	Peter Lawford (guest host), Lee Marvin, Pat Henry, George Kirby	Monti Rock
1681	May 7, 1969	Bob Newhart (guest host), Richard Benjamin, Paula Prentiss, Arthur Schlesinger, Alejandro Rey, Sandy Baron	Ray Stevens
1682	May 8, 1969	Bob Newhart (guest host), James Coburn, Robert Ryan, Rod McKuen, Bob and Ray, Katharine Houghton	N/A
1683	May 9, 1969	Carl Reiner (guest host), David Janssen, Gabriel Dell, Dick Carter	N/A
1684	May 12, 1969	Don Rickles (guest host), Ann-Margret, Roger Smith, Ernie Terrell	Tiny Tim, Jean Terrell
Jean Terrell was the sister of Ernie Terrell
1685	May 13, 1969	Don Rickles (guest host), Iris Adrian, David and Goliath	Bobby Vinton
1686	May 14, 1969	Don Rickles (guest host), Ed Sullivan, Kraft Music Hall producers Dwight Hemion and Gary Smith, Elizabeth Post, Lore Dana and her Venetian doves	Jerry Vale, Angel Pablo
1687	May 15, 1969	Bob Newhart (guest host), James Coburn, Marty Allen, Heywood Hale Broun	Johnny Mathis, Betty Walker
1688	May 16, 1969	Bob Newhart (guest host), David Steinberg, Hines, Hines and Dad, Jim Fowler, Lee Meredith	Bobby Russell
1689	May 19, 1969	Nicol Williamson, George Lindsay	N/A
1690	May 20, 1969	Orson Bean, Charlie Callas	N/A
1691	May 21, 1969	Tony Randall, Shecky Greene	N/A
1692	May 22, 1969	Robert Wagner, Marian Mercer, psychologist George Bach	N/A
1693	May 23, 1969	Woody Allen, Joey Heatherton	N/A
1694	May 26, 1969	Jack Lemmon, Joan Rivers	Sue Raney
1695	May 27, 1969	Lynn Redgrave, George Segal	Pete Seeger, Arlo Guthrie
1696	May 28, 1969	Truman Capote	Judy Collins
1697	May 29, 1969	Allard Lowenstein	John Hartford
1698	May 30, 1969	Peter Lawford (guest host), Marty Allen, Pat Henry, José Greco	N/A

=== June ===
No.	Original release date	Guest(s)	Musical/entertainment guest(s)
1699	June 2, 1969	Howard Da Silva	N/A
1700	June 3, 1969	Polly Bergen	N/A
1701	June 4, 1969	Bob & Ray	Trini Lopez
1702	June 5, 1969	Buffalo Bob Smith	N/A
1703	June 6, 1969	Mary Hopkin, Gordon MacRae	N/A
1704	June 9, 1969	Flip Wilson (guest host), George Carlin, Chuck Jackson	N/A
1705	June 10, 1969	TBA	N/A
1706	June 11, 1969	TBA	N/A
1707	June 12, 1969	Sen. Edmund Muskie	N/A
1708	June 13, 1969	Joan Rivers, Dana Valery, Stan Freberg, Jim Fowler	N/A
"Split Billboards"
1709	June 16, 1969	David Frye, Chuck Barris, David Susskind	N/A
1710	June 17, 1969	John Byner	The Monkees
1711	June 18, 1969	Bernadette Peters, Jimmy Breslin	N/A
1712	June 19, 1969	Harry Nilsson, Bennett Cerf, Morey Amsterdam	N/A
1713	June 20, 1969	Woody Allen (guest host), Muhammad Ali	N/A
1714	June 23, 1969	Orson Bean (guest host), Gloria Steinem	N/A
1715	June 24, 1969	Gov. Nelson Rockefeller	N/A
1716	June 25, 1969	Sen. George Murphy	Tiny Tim
1717	June 26, 1969	Kaye Ballard, Cliff Robertson, Ann-Margret, Ace Trucking Company	N/A
1718	June 27, 1969	George Segal (guest host), Eva Marie Saint	N/A
1719	June 30, 1969	Tony Randall	Ray Charles
William Redfield serves as the show's announcer

=== July ===
No.	Original release date	Guest(s)	Musical/entertainment guest(s)
1720	July 1, 1969	Phyllis Newman, Jack Newfield, comedian Bob King	N/A
William Redfield serves as the show's announcer
1721	July 2, 1969	Bob Crane, The Golddiggers, Stanley Myron Handelman	Lynn Mink
Durwood Kirby serves as the show's announcer
1722	July 3, 1969	Shari Lewis, Rodney Dangerfield	The What For
Durwood Kirby serves as the show's announcer
1723	July 4, 1969	Corbett Monica (guest host)	N/A
Durwood Kirby serves as the show's announcer
1724	July 7, 1969	Flip Wilson (guest host), Claire Bloom	N/A
1725	July 8, 1969	Flip Wilson (guest host), Lew Alcindor, Rip Taylor	N/A
1726	July 9, 1969	Flip Wilson (guest host), Henny Youngman, Stiller and Meara	Kenny Rankin and Jerry Merrick
1727	July 10, 1969	Flip Wilson (guest host), Jacqueline Susann, Nina Simone, Jerry Shane	Jimi Hendrix, Wilson Pickett, Joe Tex
1728	July 11, 1969	Flip Wilson (guest host), Milton Berle	N/A
1729	July 14, 1969	Carl Reiner (guest host), Buddy Hackett, Jerome Weidman	N/A
1730	July 15, 1969	Carl Reiner (guest host), Neil Simon, Marilyn Michaels, Arthur Hailey	N/A
1731	July 16, 1969	Carl Reiner (guest host), Ruth Gordon, Gwen Davis, Jamie Carr	N/A
1732	July 17, 1969	Carl Reiner (guest host), Jackie Vernon, Claire Bloom, Elizabeth Hubbard	N/A
1733	July 18, 1969	Carl Reiner (guest host), Godfrey Cambridge, Judy Pace	London Lee
1734	July 21, 1969	Buddy Rich, Buddy Hackett	Gerri Granger
1735	July 22, 1969	Burt Lancaster, Bob & Ray, Lenny Price	Jeannie C. Riley
1736	July 23, 1969	Truman Capote, Red Buttons, Robert Klein	Linda Ronstadt
1737	July 24, 1969	Jan Murray (guest host), Rich Little, Peter Fonda	Anita Bryant, Sergio Mendes and Bossa Ria
1738	July 25, 1969	Rodney Dangerfield	N/A
1739	July 28, 1969	Shecky Greene, Theodore White, Richard Ryder, Nancy Cherry, Judy Shackleford	What Four
1740	July 29, 1969	Orson Bean, Corbett Monica, Jay Richard Kennedy	Richie Havens
1741	July 30, 1969	TBA	N/A
1742	July 31, 1969	Charlie Callas, Phyllis Newman	N/A

=== August ===
No.	Original release date	Guest(s)	Musical/entertainment guest(s)
1743	August 1, 1969	Jack Albertson, Bob and Ray, Mimi Hines and Phil Ford	Duke Ellington, Bobby Hebb
1744	August 4, 1969	Flip Wilson (guest host)	The Chambers Brothers, Irving Fields
1745	August 5, 1969	Flip Wilson (guest host), Pat Morita, Gordon Parks, John Fairfax	Joe Tex; Hines, Hines and Dad
1746	August 6, 1969	Flip Wilson (guest host), Dr. Joyce Brothers, Barbara Walters, Dody Goodman, Rosalind Cash	Nina Simone
1747	August 7, 1969	Bob Newhart (guest host), Jack Cassidy	Joan Baez, Kole and Param
1748	August 8, 1969	Bob Newhart (guest host), Dave Garroway, Polly Bergen, Ashley Montagu	Monti Rock III
1749	August 11, 1969	(FROM LOS ANGELES); Judy Carne, George Burns, Don Knotts, Gene Barry	N/A
Mighty Carson Art Players skit
1750	August 12, 1969	(FROM LOS ANGELES); Bob Newhart, Ozzie Nelson, Harriet Nelson, Jill St. John	Sarah Vaughan
1751	August 13, 1969	(FROM LOS ANGELES); Kaye Ballard	N/A
1752	August 14, 1969	(FROM LOS ANGELES); Debbie Reynolds, Rose Marie, John Byner, George Lindsey, Carl Reiner	N/A
1753	August 15, 1969	(FROM LOS ANGELES); Shari Lewis, Red Buttons, Irv Benson	Tiny Tim
1754	August 18, 1969	(FROM LOS ANGELES); Bob Hope, Eva Gabor	N/A
1755	August 19, 1969	(FROM LOS ANGELES); Joe DiMaggio, Raquel Welch, Shecky Greene	Marilyn Maye
1756	August 20, 1969	(FROM LOS ANGELES); Lucille Ball, Flip Wilson	The Friends of Distinction
1757	August 21, 1969	(FROM LOS ANGELES); Phyllis Diller, Dan Rowan, Dick Martin	Bobby Darin, The Unusual We
1758	August 22, 1969	(FROM LOS ANGELES); Bill Cosby, Anne Baxter, Ricardo Montalbán, Andy Devine	N/A
1759	August 25, 1969	Robert Stack, Barbara Rush, Wally Cox, Kaye Ballard, Stanley Myron Handelman, magician Albert Goshman	The First Edition
1760	August 26, 1969	Clare Boothe Luce, Bernadette Devlin McAliskey	N/A
1761	August 27, 1969	Joan Rivers, Don DeFore	Lana Cantrell
1762	August 28, 1969	David Susskind, Charlie Callas, Donna Jean Young	Arlo Guthrie
1763	August 29, 1969	Jerry Lewis (guest host), multiple Miss America contestants	Ricky Nelson, Leon Bibb, Hines, Hines and Dad
Peter Lawford served as the show's announcer

=== September ===
No.	Original release date	Guest(s)	Musical/entertainment guest(s)
1764	September 1, 1969	Tony Randall, William Holden, Pat Morita	Marilyn Maye, Turley Richards
1765	September 2, 1969	Jaye P. Morgan, John Byner, Orson Bean, Adela Rogers St. Johns	N/A
1766	September 3, 1969	Phyllis Newman, Corbett Monica	Mel Tormé, The People Tree
1767	September 4, 1969	Dana Valery	The Youngbloods, Jimmie Rodgers
1768	September 5, 1969	David Frye, Linda Bennett	Gary Lewis and the Playboys
1769	September 8, 1969	Alan King, Peter Fonda, Jacqueline Susann, Suzanne Charny	N/A
1770	September 9, 1969	Jay Silverheels, Charlie Callas, Dody Goodman	N/A
1771	September 10, 1969	Robert Merrill, Bob and Ray	N/A
1772	September 11, 1969	Peter Lawford (guest host), Sammy Davis Jr.	Monti Rock III, The Checkmates
1773	September 12, 1969	Eartha Kitt	N/A
1774	September 15, 1969	Woody Allen, Bennett Cerf, Dody Goodman	N/A
1775	September 16, 1969	Joseph Cotten, Jaye P. Morgan, Ashley Montagu	N/A
1776	September 17, 1969	Dina Merrill, Mitzi Gaynor	Jimmy Slyde
1777	September 18, 1969	Helen Hayes, Cliff Robertson, Robert Downey Sr.	Tiny Tim, Nick Lucas
1778	September 19, 1969	Zsa Zsa Gabor, Robert Culp, David Steinberg	Monti Rock III
1779	September 22, 1969	Dick Cavett, Pamela Mason	Gloria Loring, Sergio Franchi
1780	September 23, 1969	Janet Leigh, Troy Donahue, Robert Klein	Pat Boone,
1781	September 24, 1969	Florence Henderson, Dick Tuck, Toots Shor, Danny Stradella, Robert Kreindler, Hy Uethtel	N/A
Shor, Stradella, Kreindler and Uethtel were all New York City restaurateurs
1782	September 25, 1969	Ozzie Nelson, Harriet Nelson, Tom Seaver, Cleon Jones, Stanley Kramer	Jane Morgan
1783	September 26, 1969	Jill St. John, Richard Loo, Alan Lee	N/A
Lee was known as "The Human Sandwich"
1784	September 29, 1969	Tony Randall, Shecky Greene	Frank Sinatra Jr.
1785	September 30, 1969	Roger Caras, Albert Goshman, Pat Collins	N/A

=== October ===
No.	Original release date	Guest(s)	Musical/entertainment guest(s)
1786	October 1, 1969	Bob Hope, Carl Reiner, Dean Martin, Debbie Reynolds, Don Rickles	N/A
7th Anniversary Show
1787	October 2, 1969	Joe Namath, Joan Bennett, Bob & Ray, Keye Luke	N/A
1788	October 3, 1969	Otto Preminger, Suzanne Charny	N/A
1789	October 6, 1969	Mr. Wizard, Rich Little, Ashley Montagu	Gloria Loring
1790	October 7, 1969	Lillian Hellman, Shecky Greene, Jaye P. Morgan, Gabe Pressman	N/A
1791	October 8, 1969	Lon Chaney Jr., Pamela Tiffin, Shani Wallis	Melanie
1792	October 9, 1969	Dick Cavett (guest host), Biff Rose, ESP specialist Marc Reymont	Sandler & Young
1793	October 10, 1969	Dick Cavett (guest host), Muhammad Ali, Rodney Dangerfield	Anthony Newley
1794	October 13, 1969	Peter Lawford (guest host), Lee Marvin, Pat Henry, Herman Levine	Jeannie C. Riley, Monti Rock
1795	October 14, 1969	Peter Lawford (guest host), Marty Allen, Desmond Morris, Nai Bonet	N/A
The October 15 show was pre-empted by NBC in order to show the program "Vietnam Moratorium: A Day in October"
1796	October 16, 1969	Alan King (guest host), Sen. George McGovern, Robert Ryan, Mac Robbins	Peter Nero, Yafa Yarkoni
1797	October 17, 1969	Alan King (guest host), Muhammad Ali, Heywood Hale Broun, Lambs Club president Jack Waldron	N/A
1798	October 20, 1969	Carl Reiner (guest host), Godfrey Cambridge, Herschel Bernardi, Peggy Cass, comedy team Edmonds and Curley	N/A
1799	October 21, 1969	Carl Reiner (guest host), Albert Brooks, Yaphet Kotto	Marilyn Maye
1800	October 22, 1969	Carl Reiner (guest host), Stanley Myron Handelman, Heather MacRae	Boyce and Hart
1801	October 23, 1969	Joan Rivers (guest host), John Davidson, Adolph Green and wife Phyllis Newman, Playboy fashion editor, Robert Greene	N/A
1802	October 24, 1969	Joan Rivers (guest host), Phyllis Diller, Ward Donovan	The Bobby Short Trio
1803	October 27, 1969	Joan Rivers, David Susskind, George Kirby	Shirley Bassey
1804	October 28, 1969	George C. Scott, Maureen Stapleton, Truman Capote, Jack DeLeon, Herb Klein	N/A
1805	October 29, 1969	Phyllis Diller, Sal Mineo, Allen Funt, Soupy Sales, Robert Downey, Sr., magician Ricky Jay	N/A
1806	October 30, 1969	Tony Randall, Bob & Ray, Toots Shor, Salome Jens	N/A
1807	October 31, 1969	Maximillian Schell, Orson Bean, E.J. Peaker, Charlie Manna	Johnny Mathis, Andre Previn

=== November ===
No.	Original release date	Guest(s)	Musical/entertainment guest(s)
1808	November 3, 1969	Steve Lawrence (guest host), Peter Max, Boni Enten, Michael Myer	Carlos Santana, Oliver
1809	November 4, 1969	Alan King (guest host), Jimmy Breslin, Pete Hamill, Heywood Hale Broun	N/A
1810	November 5, 1969	(FROM LOS ANGELES); Bob Hope, Bill Cosby, Rose Marie	Bobby Darin
1811	November 6, 1969	(FROM LOS ANGELES); Carol Wayne, George Raft, Robert Strauss	N/A
1812	November 7, 1969	(FROM LOS ANGELES); Eva Gabor, Edgar Bergen	Cass Elliott
1813	November 10, 1969	(FROM LOS ANGELES); David Steinberg, Bill Dana, Jill St. John, Gypsy Rose Lee	Tennessee Ernie Ford
1814	November 11, 1969	(FROM LOS ANGELES); Eddie Albert, Jonathan Winters, Jaye P. Morgan	Diana Ross & the Supremes
1815	November 12, 1969	(FROM LOS ANGELES); Bob Newhart, Billy de Wolfe	Lou Rawls
1816	November 13, 1969	(FROM LOS ANGELES); Kaye Ballard, Carl Reiner, Peter Lawford	Sergio Mendes
1817	November 14, 1969	(FROM LOS ANGELES); Bob Hope, George Lindsey	Roger Miller, Lynn Kellogg
1818	November 17, 1969	(FROM LOS ANGELES); Jack Benny, Steve Allen, Barbara Eden, Jayne Meadows, Ann Blyth	Vic Damone
1819	November 18, 1969	(FROM LOS ANGELES); Lucille Ball, Red Buttons, Louie Nye, Ozzie Nelson, Harriet Nelson	Della Reese, Trini Lopez
1820	November 19, 1969	(FROM LOS ANGELES); Suzanne Charny	Leslie Uggams
1821	November 20, 1969	(FROM LOS ANGELES); Charlton Heston, Goldie Hawn, Fernando Lamas, George Chakiris	Jane Powell
Limerick Contest
1822	November 21, 1969	(FROM LOS ANGELES); Mickey Rooney, Agnes Moorehead, Anne Howard	Wayne Cochran
1823	November 24, 1969	(FROM LOS ANGELES); Kirk Douglas, Debbie Reynolds, Karen Jensen	N/A
1824	November 25, 1969	(FROM LOS ANGELES); George Burns, Gov. Ronald Reagan, Nancy Reagan, George Gobel, Diahann Carroll, Anjanette Comer	N/A
1825	November 26, 1969	Joe Garagiola (guest host), Pat Henry	N/A
1826	November 27, 1969	Joe Namath (guest host), Jackie Vernon, Louisa Moritz, Don Maynard, Matt Snell, Jim Turner, Bake Turner	N/A
1827	November 28, 1969	Peter Lawford (guest host)	Cass Elliott

=== December ===
No.	Original release date	Guest(s)	Musical/entertainment guest(s)
1828	December 1, 1969	David Frye	N/A
1829	December 2, 1969	Shelley Winters, David Susskind	N/A
1830	December 3, 1969	Marty Brill, Willis Reed	N/A
1831	December 4, 1969	Jane Fonda, David Steinberg	James Brown
1832	December 5, 1969	Peter Lawford (guest host), Dick Cavett	N/A
1833	December 8, 1969	George Kirby, Julie London	Tiny Tim
1834	December 9, 1969	Tony Randall, Yves Montand, Linda Bennett	Irene Papas
1835	December 10, 1969	Robert Klein, Phyllis Diller, Ellen Peck	Buddy Greco
1836	December 11, 1969	Alfred Hitchcock, Rodney Dangerfield, Biff Rose	N/A
1837	December 12, 1969	Dick Cavett (guest host), Earl Wilson Jr., Buck Henry, Milt Kamen	N/A
1838	December 15, 1969	Ingrid Bergman, Gig Young, Jaye P. Morgan	N/A
1839	December 16, 1969	Charlie Callas	Barbara Tai-Sing
1840	December 17, 1969	The wedding of Tiny Tim and Miss Vicki, Phyllis Diller, Florence Henderson, Rudy Vallee	Nick Lucas
Do's and Don't's for Weddings
1841	December 18, 1969	Bob & Ray, Biff Rose, artist Jan de Ruth	Hines, Hines and Dad
1842	December 19, 1969	Peter Lawford (guest host), George Carlin, Ted Sorensen, Tammy Grimes	N/A
1843	December 22, 1969	Hugh Downs (guest host), Robert Ryan, Bernadette Peters	N/A
1844	December 23, 1969	Orson Bean (guest host), Jonathan Frid	N/A
1845	December 25, 1969	Florence Henderson (guest host), The Ritts Puppets	N/A
1846	December 26, 1969	Corbett Monica (guest host), Victor Buono, Ellen Peck, Noel Behn, Ronnie Martin	N/A
1847	December 29, 1969	New York City mayor John Lindsay	N/A
1848	December 30, 1969	Marty Brill, John Lahr	N/A
1849	December 31, 1969	Jim Backus, Hugh Hefner, Woody Allen, Charlie Callas, George Raft	N/A
