= List of The Tonight Show Starring Johnny Carson episodes (1968) =

Release
- Original network: NBC

Season chronology
- ← Previous; 1967 episodes Next → 1969 episodes

The following is a list of episodes of the television series The Tonight Show Starring Johnny Carson which aired in 1968. In October, 1962 Johnny Carson took over as host of the show from the previous host Jack Paar.

== 1968 ==
=== January ===
No.	Original release date	Guest(s)	Musical/entertainment guest(s)
1336	January 1, 1968	Bart Starr, Daryle Lamonica, Don Meredith, Pete Beathard	N/A
1337	January 2, 1968	TBA	N/A
1338	January 3, 1968	Margaret Mead, David Steinberg, Bosley Crowther	Spanky and Our Gang
1339	January 4, 1968	Barbara Walters, Ron Carey	N/A
1340	January 5, 1968	Tony Randall	N/A
1341	January 8, 1968	Rich Little, Adela Rogers St. Johns, bird calling expert	N/A
1342	January 9, 1968	NASA scientist Robert Jastrow	Liza Minnelli
1343	January 10, 1968	John Glenn	Al Hirt
Members of the Ice Follies performed.
1344	January 11, 1968	Stella Stevens	N/A
1345	January 12, 1968	Don Rickles (guest host), Robert Culp, Sammy Davis Jr.	Connie Francis
1346	January 15, 1968	TBA	Cab Calloway
1347	January 16, 1968	Bob Hope, Pat Paulsen	Tony Darryl
1348	January 17, 1968	Bennett Cerf, Norm Crosby, Don Herbert	Marilyn Maye
1349	January 18, 1968	TBA	The Koehler Brothers
1350	January 19, 1968	Dirk Bogarde, Maharishi Mahesh	N/A
1351	January 22, 1968	David Frost, Sebastian Cabot, Leonard Marks, director of the United States Information Agency	The First Edition
1352	January 23, 1968	Fannie Flagg, Orson Bean, Clifton Fadiman	Wes Montgomery
1353	January 24, 1968	Mort Sahl, David Merrick, Betty Furness	John Fred and His Playboy Band
1354	January 25, 1968	Dick Cavett, George Kirby, Secretary of the Interior Stewart L. Udall, Lee Beery	N/A
1355	January 26, 1968	Peggy Cass, George Kirby, Jim Fowler	N/A
1356	January 29, 1968	Rod Steiger, Flip Wilson, The Jose Molina Dancers, Madam Irene Quo, Chinese expert in Chinese foods and customs	N/A
1357	January 30, 1968	Ron Carey, Pat McCormick, Desmond Morris	Roger Miller
1358	January 31, 1968	Jim Garrison	Melanie

=== February ===
No.	Original release date	Guest(s)	Musical/entertainment guest(s)
1359	February 1, 1968	Mark Tendler	Richie Havens
1360	February 2, 1968	Albert Finney, Eddy Arnold, Robert Klein, Joan Rivers	N/A
1361	February 5, 1968	Harry Belafonte (guest host) Senator Robert F. Kennedy, The Smothers Brothers, Bill Cosby	Lena Horne
1362	February 6, 1968	Harry Belafonte (guest host), Zero Mostel, Diahann Carroll	Petula Clark
1363	February 7, 1968	Harry Belafonte (guest host)	N/A
1364	February 8, 1968	Harry Belafonte (guest host) Nipsey Russell, Dunja Rajter, Paul Newman, Martin Luther King Jr.	N/A
1365	February 9, 1968	Harry Belafonte (guest host)	N/A
1366	February 12, 1968	(FROM LOS ANGELES) Nancy Sinatra, Liberace, Douglas Fairbanks Jr.	N/A
1367	February 13, 1968	(FROM LOS ANGELES) James Drury, Doug McClure, Ray Bolger	Shirley Jones
Mighty Carson Art Players- "Bar Room Brawl Sketch".
1368	February 14, 1968	(FROM LOS ANGELES) Mickey Rooney, Danny Thomas	N/A
1369	February 15, 1968	(FROM LOS ANGELES) Sid Caesar, Richard Pryor, Bobby Darin	N/A
1370	February 16, 1968	(FROM LOS ANGELES) Don Rickles, Don Adams, Sherry Jackson	Sonny & Cher
Japanese Bath Sketch.
1371	February 19, 1968	(FROM LOS ANGELES) James Garner, Milton Berle, Richard Crenna	The King Cousins
1372	February 20, 1968	(FROM LOS ANGELES) Steve Allen, Jack Webb, Shecky Greene, Spanky Wilson	N/A
Mighty Carson Art Players- "Copper Clappers".
1373	February 21, 1968	(FROM LOS ANGELES) George Carlin, Eva Gabor, Richard Benjamin, Paula Prentiss	N/A
1374	February 22, 1968	(FROM LOS ANGELES) Jerry Lewis	Lennon Sisters
1375	February 23, 1968	(FROM LOS ANGELES) Tony Curtis, Richard Pryor, Bill Cosby, April Taten	N/A
1376	February 26, 1968	Eydie Gorme	The Cowsills
1377	February 27, 1968	Orson Bean	N/A
1378	February 28, 1968	TBA	N/A
1379	February 29, 1968	Vincent Price, Joey Heatherton	N/A

=== March ===
No.	Original release date	Guest(s)	Musical/entertainment guest(s)
1380	March 1, 1968	Art Carney, Susan Strasberg	The Serendipity Singers
1381	March 4, 1968	Adela Rogers St. Johns	Sonny and Cher
1382	March 5, 1968	Richard Pryor, Robert Blake, Gayle Hunnicutt	N/A
1383	March 6, 1968	Buddy Hackett, Sen. Charles Percy	N/A
1384	March 7, 1968	Darryl Zanuck, Ron Carey, Pat McCormick	N/A
1385	March 8, 1968	Peggy Cass	Andre Previn, The Critters
1386	March 11, 1968	Richard Harris, Rich Little, archery Hall of Famer Gail Martin	N/A
1387	March 12, 1968	Alan King, Art Linkletter	N/A
1388	March 13, 1968	Author John D. MacDonald	N/A
1389	March 14, 1968	Gore Vidal, Isaac Asimov	Bobby Scott
1390	March 15, 1968	Joan Rivers, Sammy Cahn, Malcolm Muggeridge, Larry Arcuri	N/A
1391	March 18, 1968	Lord Louis Mountbatten, Robert Klein, Jerome Gould	N/A
1392	March 19, 1968	Bergen Evans	N/A
A men's fashion show is presented.
1393	March 20, 1968	S.I. Hayakawa	Glen Campbell
1394	March 21, 1968	Robert Goulet, Carol Lawrence, Stiller and Meara, Clifton Fadiman	N/A
1395	March 22, 1968	George C. Scott, Ron Carey, Pat McCormick	Marilyn Maye
1396	March 25, 1968	Sammy Davis Jr. (guest host), Leslie Uggams, Red Buttons, Vice President Hubert Humphrey	N/A
1397	March 26, 1968	Sammy Davis Jr. (guest host), Lady Carolyn Townshend, Ralph Pope	Sonny & Cher, Bobby Vinton
1398	March 27, 1968	Sammy Davis Jr. (guest host), Ron Karenga, Carl Barry	James Brown, Lola Falana
1399	March 28, 1968	Sammy Davis Jr. (guest host); Eydie Gorme, Bob Melvin	Louis Armstrong, Josephine Premice
1400	March 29, 1968	Sammy Davis Jr. (guest host), Gloria DeHaven, Keir Dullea, Emily Yancy	Steve Lawrence

=== April ===
No.	Original release date	Guest(s)	Musical/entertainment guest(s)
1401	April 1, 1968	Phil Foster	Flatt and Scruggs
1402	April 2, 1968	Jack Douglas and wife Reiko, Mike Todd Jr., trapeze artist Tito Gaona	N/A
1403	April 3, 1968	Rich Little, Rex Reed	Richie Havens
1404	April 4, 1968	Neil Simon, George Carlin, Peggy Fleming, Phil Leeds	Tiny Tim, Kim Weston
1405	April 5, 1968	Patricia Neal, attorney James F. Neal, Bill Moyers, Sammy Davis Jr.	Diana Ross & the Supremes
Carson forgoes monologue, opting to sit on the front of his desk and talk about the assassination of Martin Luther King Jr., who had been a guest on the show eight weeks earlier. Later in the program, King's appearance from February 8, 1968 is replayed.
1406	April 8, 1968	Alan King, Flip Wilson, Art Buchwald	Liza Minnelli, The Irish Rovers
1407	April 9, 1968	Orson Bean, Cyril Ritchard, Jimmy Breslin, Janis Paige	The Mills Brothers
1408	April 10, 1968	Don Rickles, Madalyn Murray O'Hair, Mita	Peter and Chris Allen
1409	April 11, 1968	Cyril Ritchard, Bergen Evans, Fred Smoot	Nancy Wilson, George Shearing
1410	April 12, 1968	Art Carney, Janis Paige	Hello People
1411	April 15, 1968	Orson Bean, Betty Furness, James Beard	N/A
1412	April 16, 1968	Richard Benjamin, Paula Prentiss, Dan Kuchinski (horseshoe champion)	N/A
1413	April 17, 1968	Alan King, Jack Douglas and wife Reiko; Don Herbert	N/A
1414	April 18, 1968	John Byner, Barbara Ferris, Harvard astronomy professor Dr. William Liller	N/A
1415	April 19, 1968	Marlon Brando,John Davidson, Colleen Moore, Frank Field	Linda Ronstadt and The Stone Poneys
1416	April 22, 1968	Bob Hope, Jack Benny	Louis Armstrong
1417	April 23, 1968	George Kirby, Pat Paulsen	N/A
1418	April 24, 1968	Madalyn Murray O'Hair, circus juggler Fudi	N/A
1419	April 25, 1968	Eva Gabor, Norm Crosby	N/A
1420	April 26, 1968	Shecky Greene, Clive Barnes, David Merrick	Leslie Uggams
1421	April 29, 1968	Flip Wilson, Truman Capote	The Petticoat Junction Girls
1422	April 30, 1968	Bob Newhart	Tiny Tim

=== May ===
No.	Original release date	Guest(s)	Musical/entertainment guest(s)
1423	May 1, 1968	Joan Rivers, Criswell, Jon Lindbergh	N/A
A fashion show of future clothing is presented.
1424	May 2, 1968	Richard Benjamin, Paula Prentiss, Ron Carey	The Beach Boys
1425	May 3, 1968	Paul Newman, Robert Klein	Peter and Chris Allen
1426	May 6, 1968	Steve Lawrence (Guest Host); Totie Fields, Sammy Cahn, Debbie Drake	Billy Eckstine
1427	May 7, 1968	Steve Lawrence (Guest Host); Neil Simon, Burt Bacharach, Florence Henderson, Charlie Manna	Julius La Rosa
1428	May 8, 1968	Steve Lawrence (Guest Host); Robert Merrill, Don Franks, Rich Little	Little Richard, Jan Peerce
1429	May 9, 1968	Steve Lawrence (Guest Host); Gig Young, Godfrey Cambridge, Mark Traynor, Johnny Mercer, Sam Levenson	Bobby Goldsboro
1430	May 10, 1968	Steve Lawrence (Guest Host); Jackie Mason, Eydie Gorme, Stiller and Meara, Jim Fowler	N/A
1431	May 13, 1968	Joe Garagiola (guest host), Jack Paar, Tony Conigliaro, Mike and Bryan	Herb Alpert and the Tijuana Brass
Jack Paar's first appearance on the Tonight Show since leaving as host. He would not appear again until 1986.
1432	May 14, 1968	Joe Garagiola (guest host), John Lennon, Paul McCartney, Tallulah Bankhead, Soupy Sales, Tony Scotti, Jack Twyman, Lou Thesz	N/A
1433	May 15, 1968	Joe Garagiola (guest host), Slappy White, John Scarne, Miss Indian America Sarah Johnson, pickpocketing expert Vic Perry	N/A
A fashion show featuring football players is presented.
1434	May 16, 1968	Joe Garagiola (guest host), Yogi Berra, Robert Goulet, Bill Dana, Art Buchwald	Toni Carroll
1435	May 17, 1968	Joe Garagiola (guest host), Nipsey Russell, Barbara Walters, Dizzy Dean; 92-year-old baseball pitcher, Amazing Randy	N/A
Dizzy Dean sings.
1436	May 20, 1968	Bob Hope, Sid Caesar, Imogene Coca, Norman Jewison	N/A
1437	May 21, 1968	Bette Davis, Scott Carpenter, Jacqueline Bisset, Pigmeat Markham	N/A
1438	May 22, 1968	Flip Wilson, Zsa Zsa Gabor	Joe Tex
A bathing suit fashion show is presented.
1439	May 23, 1968	Irene Ryan, Clair and McMahon	N/A
1440	May 24, 1968	John Byner, Juliet Prowse, Noel Harrison	N/A
"War and Beets" sketch (Spoof of "War and Peace")
1441	May 27, 1968	Slappy White, Erika Pinske performs a circus rope ballet	Tiny Tim
1442	May 28, 1968	TBA	The Four Freshmen
1443	May 29, 1968	TBA	N/A
1444	May 30, 1968	Richard Harris, Phyllis McGuire, Peggy Moffitt	N/A
1445	May 31, 1968	James Garner, Jane Elliott	The Box Tops

=== June ===
No.	Original release date	Guest(s)	Musical/entertainment guest(s)
1446	June 3, 1968	Bob Hope	N/A
6/4/68 pre-empted by NBC News coverage of California and South Dakota primaries.
N–A	June 5, 1968	Preempted by coverage of the Assassination of Robert F. Kennedy	N/A
Scheduled guests were Clifton Fadiman, Joe E. Lewis and Trini Lopez
N–A	June 6, 1968	Preempted by coverage of the Assassination of Robert F. Kennedy	N/A
Scheduled guests were Victor Borge and Joey Heatherton
1447	June 7, 1968	Entire show was devoted to memorializing Robert F. Kennedy.	N/A
1448	June 10, 1968	Doug McClure	N/A
1449	June 11, 1968	Oskar Werner	N/A
1450	June 12, 1968	Dan Rowan and Dick Martin, Peggy Cass	N/A
1451	June 13, 1968	Joe E. Lewis	Trini Lopez
1452	June 14, 1968	Magician Don Alan	Jimmy Webb
1453	June 17, 1968	New York City Mayor John Lindsay, Marilyn Maye	Boots Randolph
1454	June 18, 1968	George Carlin, Oskar Werner	N/A
1455	June 19, 1968	Raquel Welch, Alan King, Pigmeat Markham, Cleve Backster	N/A
Cleve Backster demonstrates plant perception; Answers to Famous Quotes (featuring Johnny, Alan King, and Raquel Welch); Alan King talks about his son's bar mitzvah.
1456	June 20, 1968	Walter Matthau, Ed Sullivan	James Brown, Nancy Wilson
1457	June 21, 1968	Steve McQueen, David Frye, Pat McCormick	N/A
1458	June 24, 1968	Bennett Cerf, Monti Rock III	Judy Garland, The Mummers
Jack Haskell replaced a vacationing Ed McMahon.
1459	June 25, 1968	Victor Borge, Margaret Hamilton, Clair and McMahon	N/A
1460	June 26, 1968	Vidal Sassoon, Perle Mesta	Aretha Franklin
1461	June 27, 1968	Norm Crosby, Heywood Hale Broun, Jean Paul Vignon, Alexandra Hay	N/A
1462	June 28, 1968	Buddy Hackett	The University of Iowa Bagpipe Band
Excerpts from the Broadway musical, Hair.

=== July ===
No.	Original release date	Guest(s)	Musical/entertainment guest(s)
1463	July 1, 1968	Billy Graham, David Frye	N/A
1464	July 2, 1968	Buddy Hackett, Margaret Hamilton, David Frost	N/A
1465	July 3, 1968	William Schutz	Homer and Jethro
1466	July 4, 1968	David Frost guest host; Jimmy Breslin	Mel Torme
1467	July 5, 1968	David Frost guest host; Joel Grey	N/A
1468	July 8, 1968	(FROM LOS ANGELES) Jack Lemmon, April Tatro	N/A
1469	July 9, 1968	(FROM LOS ANGELES) Bob Newhart, Janet Leigh	Sonny and Cher
1470	July 10, 1968	(FROM LOS ANGELES) Tom Smothers, The Committee, Eva Gabor	Tiny Tim
Part of a sketch by The Committee was censored by NBC.
1471	July 11, 1968	(FROM LOS ANGELES) Lucille Ball, James Garner, Richard Pryor	N/A
1472	July 12, 1968	(FROM LOS ANGELES) Don Rickles, Don Adams, Phyllis Diller	N/A
1473	July 15, 1968	(FROM LOS ANGELES) Jerry Lewis, David Janssen, Kaye Ballard	N/A
1474	July 16, 1968	(FROM LOS ANGELES) Dinah Shore, Pat Paulsen, Sebastian Cabot	Glen Campbell
1475	July 17, 1968	(FROM LOS ANGELES) Bill Cosby, Vincent Price, Eva Gabor, Bill Dana	Roger Miller
1476	July 18, 1968	(FROM LOS ANGELES) Carol Wayne, Lana Wood, Ralph Williams	N/A
1477	July 19, 1968	(FROM LOS ANGELES) George Burns, Debbie Reynolds, Carl Reiner, Karl Malden, Don Davis	N/A
1478	July 22, 1968	Alan King guest host; Ed Begley, Jackie Vernon	N/A
1479	July 23, 1968	Alan King guest host; Pat Henry	N/A
1480	July 24, 1968	Alan King guest host; Rod Serling	Paul Anka
1481	July 25, 1968	Flip Wilson	Ray Price
1482	July 26, 1968	Godfrey Cambridge	N/A
1483	July 29, 1968	Richard Pryor	N/A
1484	July 30, 1968	Joan Fontaine	N/A
1485	July 31, 1968	Cyril Ritchard, Clifton Fadiman	N/A

=== August ===
No.	Original release date	Guest(s)	Musical/entertainment guest(s)
1486	August 1, 1968	Harold Glasson of the National Rifle Association	Jean-Paul Vignon
1487	August 2, 1968	New York City mayor John Lindsay, Jill St. John, Ricardo Montalbán	N/A
1488	August 5, 1968	Tony Randall	Lou Rawls, The Golddiggers
1489	August 6, 1968	Pat Paulsen, Helen O'Connell, model Veruschka	N/A
1490	August 7, 1968	Ricardo Montalbán, Robert Ettinger, Irwin C. Watson	Hello People
1491	August 8, 1968	Joel Grey, William Mooney, Myron Cohen, Robert Klein	N/A
1492	August 9, 1968	TBA	The Bee Gees
1493	August 12, 1968	Don Rickles, Barbara Walters, Robert Ettinger, Al Hansen	Liberace
1494	August 13, 1968	Jimmy Breslin, Jack E. Leonard	The Beach Boys, Kaye Stevens
A gas-powered unicycle won't start!
1495	August 14, 1968	Vice President Hubert Humphrey, Alan King, Peter Finch, Robert David Lion Gardiner	Arthur Prysock
1496	August 15, 1968	Fannie Flagg, Peter Max, Students from a clown school	N/A
1497	August 16, 1968	Allen Funt, Charlie Callas	N/A
1498	August 19, 1968	Jerry Lewis guest host; The Smothers Brothers, Pat Paulsen, Connie Stevens	N/A
1499	August 20, 1968	Jerry Lewis guest host; Cornel Wilde, Charlie Callas, Harry Goz	N/A
1500	August 21, 1968	Jerry Lewis guest host; Joanne Woodward, Jose Ferrer, Dr. Joyce Brothers	N/A
1501	August 22, 1968	Jerry Lewis guest host; Cliff Robertson, Davis & Reese	Robert Goulet, Barry Gray
1502	August 23, 1968	Jerry Lewis guest host; Paul Newman, Allan Sherman, Bob Fletcher, Vicki Lano	Mel Torme
1503	August 26, 1968	Bob Newhart guest host; Shecky Greene, Clive Barnes	Leslie Uggams
1504	August 27, 1968	Bob Newhart guest host; Godfrey Cambridge, Michael Allen	Marilyn Maye, The Times Square Two
1505	August 28, 1968	Bob Newhart guest host; Scoey Mitchell	N/A
1506	August 29, 1968	Bob Newhart guest host; Dick Roman	Dick Roman, Jackie and Roy
1507	August 30, 1968	Bob Newhart guest host; Bob Crane, Steven Birmingham	The Geezinslaw Brothers

=== September ===
No.	Original release date	Guest(s)	Musical/entertainment guest(s)
1508	September 2, 1968	TBA	The Craig Hundley Trio
1509	September 3, 1968	Raymond Burr, Gloria Steinem	The Golddiggers, The Muppets
1510	September 4, 1968	Yonley	N/A
1511	September 5, 1968	Connie Von Hagen	N/A
1512	September 6, 1968	David Frye	N/A
1513	September 9, 1968	Polly Bergen	Sandler & Young
Johnny Carson Rides a Unicycle
1514	September 10, 1968	Rene Carpenter	N/A
1515	September 11, 1968	Ruth Montgomery	James Brown
1516	September 12, 1968	Mickey Mantle, Veruschka	N/A
1517	September 13, 1968	Alan King (guest host), Matt Monro, Bill Moyers	N/A
1518	September 16, 1968	Billy Eckstein, Joseph W. Barr	Sandler & Young
1519	September 17, 1968	Slappy White, Lesley Gore, Cere Robinson	N/A
1520	September 18, 1968	Marilyn Maye	N/A
1521	September 19, 1968	Joe Tex	N/A
1522	September 20, 1968	Peter Ustinov	N/A
1523	September 23, 1968	John Davidson (guest host), George Carlin	N/A
1524	September 24, 1968	Alan King, Mamie Van Doren	N/A
1525	September 25, 1968	Buddy Hackett, Herb Tarr	N/A
1526	September 26, 1968	George Carlin	N/A
1527	September 27, 1968	David Frye, Henry Trefflich	N/A
1528	September 30, 1968	David Frost (guest host), Phyllis Newman, Dr. Julian Fast	N/A

=== October ===
No.	Original release date	Guest(s)	Musical/entertainment guest(s)
1529	October 1, 1968	Clips of past highlights and special guests visit	N/A
6th Anniversary Show
1530	October 2, 1968	Twiggy, Trevor Howard, Mario Andretti, Adela Rogers St. Johns	N/A
1531	October 3, 1968	Leonard Whiting, Olivia Hussey, The Pickle Brothers	N/A
1532	October 4, 1968	Shelley Winters	Marilyn Maye, Joao Gilberto
1533	October 7, 1968	Bob Crane (guest host), Pamela Mason, Irwin Corey, David Hemmings, Dave Barry	N/A
1534	October 8, 1968	Bob Crane (guest host), Patricia Neal, Gig Young, Jack Valenti	Engelbert Humperdinck
1535	October 9, 1968	Bob Crane (guest host), Cliff Robertson, Sheila MacRae	N/A
1536	October 10, 1968	Dinah Shore (guest host), Dina Merrill, Rich Little, Jack Albertson, Arthur Ashe, Pancho Gonzalez	N/A
1537	October 11, 1968	Dinah Shore (guest host), Shecky Greene, Oscar de la Renta	Jack Jones
1538	October 14, 1968	David McCallum, Chet Huntley, Alice Faye, Dr. Nauricio Obregon	N/A
An "eatable" fashion show is presented.
1539	October 15, 1968	Jill St. John, Bob Gibson, Kay Reid	N/A
1540	October 16, 1968	Tony Curtis, William Bradford Huie, Rita Smith	N/A
1541	October 17, 1968	Allen Funt, Melvin Belli	N/A
1542	October 18, 1968	Victor Borge, Thalassa Cruso	N/A
1543	October 21, 1968	Phyllis Diller (guest host), Rip Taylor, Norm Crosby, Ward Donovan	N/A
1544	October 22, 1968	Mia Farrow, Ronnie Dyson, Gilbert Becaud	N/A
1545	October 23, 1968	Gerald Scarfe, Roberta Quinlan	The Ramsey Lewis Trio
1546	October 24, 1968	Carol Wayne, Rita Smith, Dennis Rudalawicz	Jack Jones
1547	October 25, 1968	Don Rickles, William Shatner, Barbara Eden, Clare Conley	Buddy Rich
1548	October 28, 1968	Eddy Arnold (guest host), Liberace, Phyllis Newman	Robert Merrill
1549	October 29, 1968	Jack Cassidy, Shirley Jones, The Muppets	N/A
1550	October 30, 1968	Joan Rivers, Alistair Cooke, Phyllis McGuire	N/A
American Federation of Musicians went on strike, meaning that there was no band for the show.
1551	October 31, 1968	Monique Wilson	Kaye Stevens, Jack Haskell

=== November ===
No.	Original release date	Guest(s)	Musical/entertainment guest(s)
1552	November 1, 1968	Woody Allen (Guest Host), Muhammad Ali, James Earl Jones, Viva	N/A
1553	November 4, 1968	Pearl Bailey (Guest Host), Anthony Quinn, Jackie Mason, Bunny Briggs	Cab Calloway, Louie Bellson
(11/5/68 pre-empted for NBC News election night coverage)
1554	November 6, 1968	(FROM LOS ANGELES) Bill Cosby, Carol Burnett, Dick Fosbury	N/A
1555	November 7, 1968	(FROM LOS ANGELES) Kirk Douglas, Bob Hope, Bob Newhart, Ed Ames	N/A
1556	November 8, 1968	(FROM LOS ANGELES) David Frye, David Janssen	N/A
1557	November 11, 1968	(FROM LOS ANGELES) Mickey Rooney, Barbara Feldon, Carol Wayne	N/A
A sketch involving Carson, Feldon and Wayne was erased due to complaints from NBC censors.
1558	November 12, 1968	(FROM LOS ANGELES) Don Rickles, Don Adams, Dan Blocker, Kaye Ballard	N/A
1559	November 13, 1968	(FROM LOS ANGELES) Dan Rowan, Dick Martin, Robert Wagner, Dinah Shore, Carol Lynley, Bill Toomey	N/A
1560	November 14, 1968	(FROM LOS ANGELES) Peter Lawford, Jonathan Winters, Rose Marie, Shecky Greene	Tiny Tim
1561	November 15, 1968	(FROM LOS ANGELES) Jack Benny, Nancy Kwan	The Golddiggers, Tennessee Ernie Ford
1562	November 18, 1968	(FROM LOS ANGELES) Bob Crane, Phyllis Diller, Darren McGavin, John Byner	N/A
1563	November 19, 1968	(FROM LOS ANGELES) Jane Fonda, Roger Vadim, Flip Wilson, The Smothers Brothers	N/A
1564	November 20, 1968	(FROM LOS ANGELES) Lucille Ball, Steve Allen	N/A
1565	November 21, 1968	(FROM LOS ANGELES) Jane Wyman, Bill Dana, Paul Lynde, Tony Curtis	N/A
November 22 show was cancelled when Johnny Carson developed a virus
1566	November 25, 1968	Peter Lawford (Guest Host), Pierre Salinger, The Committee	N/A
1567	November 26, 1968	Peter Lawford (Guest Host), Lucille Ball, Ann-Margret, Roger Smith, Richard Pryor	Bobbie Gentry
1568	November 27, 1968	Peter Lawford (Guest Host), Jack Lemmon, Jerry Lewis, Otto Preminger, Vic Perry	N/A
1569	November 28, 1968	Peter Lawford (Guest Host), George Hamilton	N/A
1570	November 29, 1968	Peter Lawford (Guest Host), Milton Berle, Dick Cavett	Steve Lawrence

=== December ===
No.	Original release date	Guest(s)	Musical/entertainment guest(s)
1571	December 2, 1968	O. J. Simpson, Ted Hendricks, Bill Stanfill, Terry Hanratty, Leroy Keyes, Jerry Levias	N/A
All of the football players were members of the Look Magazine All-American Football Team
1572	December 3, 1968	Shari Lewis, John Cassavetes, Gena Rowlands	N/A
1573	December 4, 1968	Charlie Callas	Astrud Gilberto
1574	December 5, 1968	Ann Landers, Irwin C. Watson	N/A
1575	December 6, 1968	George Segal	N/A
1576	December 9, 1968	Orson Bean (Guest Host); George Kirby, Beryl Reid	N/A
1577	December 10, 1968	Polly Bergen, Alan Bates, Alan Alda	Gloria Loring
1578	December 11, 1968	Rod Steiger	N/A
1579	December 12, 1968	Susannah York, Jack Carter	N/A
1580	December 13, 1968	James Garner	Tiny Tim
1581	December 16, 1968	Woody Allen (guest host), Shari Lewis	Turk Murphy
1582	December 17, 1968	Judy Garland, Slappy White, Jerry Kramer	Judy Garland performed ("It's All For You" and "Till After The Holidays")
Judy sings "It's All For You" and "After The Holidays".
1583	December 18, 1968	James Mason, Sheldon Leonard	Tiny Tim
1584	December 19, 1968	Simone Signoret	Liza Minnelli
1585	December 20, 1968	Vanessa Redgrave, David Frye, Hines, Hines & Dad, painter Jan De Ruth	N/A
1586	December 23, 1968	Alan King (guest host); Maureen Stapleton	N/A
1587	December 25, 1968	Jack Jones (guest host), Sammy Cahn, Chuck McCann, Ivan Sanderson, Irwin C. Watson	Jane Morgan
1588	December 26, 1968	Jack Jones (guest host), Milt Kamen, Phyllis Newman, Don Murray, Hines, Hines & Dad	N/A
1589	December 27, 1968	Jack Jones (guest host), Dick Cavett, Henry Borovik	N/A
1590	December 30, 1968	Rod Steiger, Harry Belafonte, Sander Vanocur, E.J. Peaker	N/A
1591	December 31, 1968	Tony Randall, Joan Rivers, Joel Grey, Jimmy Breslin	Jan Peerce
