= Marty Brill =

Marty Brill may refer to:

- Marty Brill (American football) (1906–1973), American football coach
- Marty Brill (comedian) (1932–2021), American comedian
