= The Gambler (1974 film) =

1974 film

- Theatrical release poster
- Directed by: Karel Reisz
- Written by: James Toback
- Produced by: Irwin Winkler; Robert Chartoff
- Starring: James Caan; Paul Sorvino; Lauren Hutton; Morris Carnovsky; Burt Young
- Cinematography: Victor J. Kemper
- Edited by: Roger Spottiswoode
- Music by: Jerry Fielding
- Production companies: Chartoff-Winkler Productions, Inc.
- Distributed by: Paramount Pictures
- Release date: October 2, 1974
- Running time: 111 minutes
- Country: United States
- Language: English

The Gambler is a 1974 American crime drama film written by James Toback and directed by Karel Reisz. It stars James Caan, Paul Sorvino, and Lauren Hutton. Caan's performance was widely lauded and was nominated for a Golden Globe.

== Plot ==
Axel Freed is a literature professor in New York City with a gambling addiction that begins to spiral out of control. In the classroom, Freed inspires his college students with his interpretations of Fyodor Dostoevsky's work. In his personal life, Axel has the affection of his beautiful girlfriend Billie and the admiration of his family, including his mother, Naomi, who is a doctor, and his grandfather, a wealthy businessman.

Axel's gambling has left him with a huge debt. His bookie, a mafioso known as Hips, likes the professor personally but threatens grave consequences if he does not pay it soon. When Billie, having been informed by Axel that he owes $44,000, questions the wisdom of her associating with him, Axel confidently tells her she loves his life's dangers, including "the possibility of blood".

After obtaining the $44,000 from his disapproving mother, Axel goes with Billie to Las Vegas and wins a small fortune, only to lose back his last $50,000 on a last-second, incredibly lucky shot in a Lakers game.

After winning $12,000 on a fixed Lakers game—a gift from another gambler—and paying it to the bookmaker, Axel is abducted by associates of the latter. The boss asks Axel if he has family who might help him pay. Axel mentions his grandfather and mother. The boss says he had asked the grandfather, who said no.

Acting on an offer from the mob, Axel lures one of his students, a star on the college's basketball team, into shaving points in his next game, so the mob can bet big on the game to cover Axel's debt. The student accepts his offer of $5,000. Having set that up, Axel visits his grandfather, who, near the end of their conversation, asks if Axel needs his help. Saying he has taken care of it, Axel leaves.

Watching the game from the stands with three of the mob's bookmakers, Axel is saved by the bribed player's point shaving in the final minutes, which causes the team to win by only six points and thus not cover an eight-point spread. Nixing a night of post-game celebration with Hips, Axel wanders off into a neighboring black ghetto, as Hips warns him the place is a "jungle."

At a ghetto bar, Axel meets a prostitute, and they go to an upstairs room of a hotel. Threatened by her pimp after refusing to pay her when she refuses to take off all her clothes, Axel eggs the pimp to cut him with his switchblade. The pimp, thinking Axel crazy, backs off, and Axel repeatedly punches him, knocks him to the floor, and kicks him over and over. Frantic, the prostitute picks up the fallen blade and slashes Axel across the face.

Bleeding from his facial wound, Axel staggers down the stairs, looks at himself in a mirror, and smiles enigmatically at his slashed cheek.

== Cast ==
- James Caan as Axel Freed
- Paul Sorvino as Hips
- Lauren Hutton as Billie
- Morris Carnovsky as A.R. Lowenthal
- Jacqueline Brookes as Naomi Freed
- Burt Young as Carmine
- Carmine Caridi as Jimmy
- Vic Tayback as One
- Steven Keats as Howie
- London Lee as Monkey
- M. Emmet Walsh as Las Vegas Gambler
- James Woods as Bank Officer
- Carl W. Crudup as Spencer
- Allan Rich as Bernie
- Stuart Margolin as Cowboy
- Ric Mancini as Sal
- Beatrice Winde as Hospital Receptionist
- Antonio Fargas as Pimp
- Richard Foronjy as Donny
- Frank Sivero as Donny's Driver
- Frank Adonis as Man in Park with Donny
- Philip Sterling as Sidney
- Patricia Fay as Bank Teller

== Production ==
The film was the first produced screenplay by James Toback. Toback had worked as an English lecturer at the City College of New York and had a gambling problem. He originally wrote The Gambler as a semi-autobiographical novel but halfway through started envisioning it as a film and turned it into a screenplay.

Toback completed it in 1972 and showed it to his friend Lucy Saroyan, who introduced Toback to Robert De Niro. Toback became enthused about the possibility of De Niro playing the lead. He showed the script to his literary agent who gave it to Mike Medavoy who attached director Karel Reisz. Reisz did not want to use De Niro and cast James Caan instead.

"Caan became a great Axel Freed, although obviously different from the character De Niro would have created", wrote Toback later. It was filmed at a time when leading actor James Caan was battling his own addiction to cocaine. Caan says the film is one of his favorites. "It's not easy to make people care about a guy who steals from his mother to pay gambling debts."

Some see the film as a loose adaptation of the short 1866 novel The Gambler by Fyodor Dostoyevsky.

== Reception ==
Roger Ebert awarded his top grade of four stars and wrote that the film "begins as a portrait of Axel Freed's personality, develops into the story of his world, and then pays off as a thriller. We become so absolutely contained by Axel's problems and dangers that they seem like our own." Vincent Canby of The New York Times was less impressed, writing, "The movie follows Axel's downward path with such care that you keep thinking there must be some illuminating purpose, but there isn't ... Mr. Reisz and Mr. Toback reportedly worked a couple of years putting the screenplay into this shape, which is lifeless." Gene Siskel of the Chicago Tribune gave the film three-and-a-half stars out of four and said that director Karel Reisz "is most successful in presenting Axel as a true sickie and his adversaries as genuinely ruthless. The latter is no mean feat, inasmuch as ruthless movie mobsters are a dime-a-dozen in these post-'Godfather' days ... We know that the film is a success, because it doesn't really matter whether Axel is a winner or a loser as the film ends. 'The Gambler' is a personality study, and like 'California Split,' its story does not hang on its ending." Arthur D. Murphy of Variety, presumably also drawing a comparison with California Split, called The Gambler "way ahead as the better of two current films about the gambling compulsion. Director Karel Reisz has one of his most compelling and effective films. Title star James Caan is excellent and the featured players are superb." Charles Champlin of the Los Angeles Times declared it "a cool, hard, perfectly cut gem of a movie, as brilliant and mysteriously deep as a fine diamond. At its center is an hypnotically absorbing performance, at once charming and dismaying, by James Caan, who must certainly have an Academy Award nomination for it." Pauline Kael of The New Yorker stated, "At 'The Gambler,' we're trapped at a maniacal lecture on gambling as existential expression. And, as almost always happens when a movie is predictable and everything is analyzed and labelled, the actions and the explanations aren't convincing. Gambling is too easy a metaphor for life; as metaphor, it belongs to the world of hardboiled fiction." Gary Arnold of The Washington Post agreed, calling it "a well-made movie invalidated at every turn by a script with big, literary pretensions but little if any dramatic credibility." Jonathan Rosenbaum of The Monthly Film Bulletin wrote that his problem with the film "is not so much a surfeit of psychological analysis—the script offers hints, not explicit causes explaining Axel's condition—as too little to account for his behaviour naturalistically, and too much to permit any sustained acceptance of the character on an allegorical or mythical level ... there is nothing in Axel that suggests hidden depths; indeed, despite Caan's consistent professionalism, the actor seems to be as disinterested in his character as Axel seems to be in himself."

After Caan's death, Filmink described the film as "peak ‘70s Caan with the star at his swaggering charming curly haired best."

The film holds a score of 83% on Rotten Tomatoes based on 12 reviews.

== Remake ==
In August 2011, Paramount Pictures announced a remake of the 1974 film The Gambler with the original producers, Irwin Winkler and Robert Chartoff. Intended as a new directorial project for Martin Scorsese, it was reported that Leonardo DiCaprio was attached as the star and William Monahan would write the screenplay. Toback criticized the announcement of the remake, revealing that the original had an autobiographical background.

Scorsese left the project after which filmmaker Todd Phillips was in talks to take over, before the film was made by director Rupert Wyatt with Mark Wahlberg in the lead role. It was released on December 25, 2014.

== See also ==
- List of American films of 1974
