= That's All I Want from You =

Single by Jaye P. Morgan
- B-side: "Dawn"
- Published: 1955
- Released: November 1954
- Recorded: 1954
- Genre: Traditional pop
- Length: 2:37
- Label: RCA Victor
- Songwriter: Fritz Rotter a.k.a. M. Rotha
- Lyricists: Jerry Livingston, Mack David

Jaye P. Morgan singles chronology
"I Ain't Got the Man" (1954)	"That's All I Want from You" (1954)	"Danger! Heartbreak Ahead" (1955)

"That's All I Want from You" is a popular song by Fritz Rotter (writing as "M. Rotha"), published in 1955.

The song was recorded by a number of artists, but became a major hit for Jaye P. Morgan, reaching No. 3 on the Billboard chart in the United States. The Silva-Tones re-charted the song in 1957, utilizing a somewhat bizarre arrangement blending rockabilly and doo-wop.

== Recorded versions ==
- Larry Darnell recorded on January 20, 1955, released by Savoy Records as catalog number 1151
- Dean Martin recorded on November 26, 1954
- Jaye P. Morgan with Hugo Winterhalter's orchestra recorded on October 2, 1954, released by RCA Victor as catalog number 20-5896
- Bing Crosby recorded the song in 1955 for use on his radio show and it was subsequently included in the box set The Bing Crosby CBS Radio Recordings (1954-56) issued by Mosaic Records (catalog MD7-245) in 2009.
- Bobby Bare with Skeeter Davis recorded in 1965, for the album Tunes for Two
- Etta James recorded December 1966, for the album Call My Name
- Nina Simone recorded January 17–21, 1978, released by CTI Records as catalog number 7084 for her 1978 album Baltimore
- Dinah Washington recorded on January 11, 1955, released by Mercury Records as catalog number 70537
- Audrey Williams released by MGM Records as catalog number 11935
- The York Brothers released by King Records as catalog number 1434
- David Box and The Shamrocks recorded "That's All I Want From You" in August 1961, in Ben Hall's Studio, Big Spring.
- Aretha Franklin in 1970 and included on the Atlantic Records LP Spirit in the Dark
- Sachal Vasandani in 2011 on his Hi-Fly CD.
- Barbara McNair in 1961
- Oscar Toney Jr
- Ernestine Anderson
- Jimmy London
- Mr. Vegas
