= Just Us (duo) =

American pop duo

Just Us was an American pop duo, consisting of songwriter Chip Taylor and session musician, Al Gorgoni. They released an album for Kapp Records in 1966 entitled I Can't Grow Peaches on a Cherry Tree. The title track was a hit single in the US, peaking at #3 on the Adult Contemporary chart and #34 on the Billboard Hot 100.

== Discography ==
=== Albums ===
- 1966: I Can't Grow Peaches on a Cherry Tree
  - Tracklist:
- Side A
1. "I Can't Grow Peaches on a Cherry Tree" (2:34)
2. "Let It Be Me" (2:09)
3. "I Keep Changing My Mind" (2:28)
4. "Only If You Love Me" (2:30)
5. "Wait By the Fire" (3:30)
6. "Reason to Believe" (2:07)
- Side B'
1. "Sorry" (2:32)
2. "Pretty Colors" (2:11)
3. "Run, Boy Run" (2:06)
4. "I'm Not Sure What I Wanna Do" (2:19)
5. "Listen to the Drummer" (2:37)
6. "You've Got Your Troubles" (2:51)

=== EPs ===
- 1967: What Are We Gonna Do
  - Tracklist
1. "What Are We Gonna Do"
2. "Sorry"
3. "Run, Boy Run"
4. "Wait By the Fire"

=== Singles ===
- 1966: "I Can't Grow Peaches on a Cherry Tree" (#3 Adult Contemporary chart; #34 Billboard Hot 100)/"I Can Save You"
- 1966: "I Keep Changing My Mind"
