= Jaye P. Morgan =

American actress and singer (1931–2026)

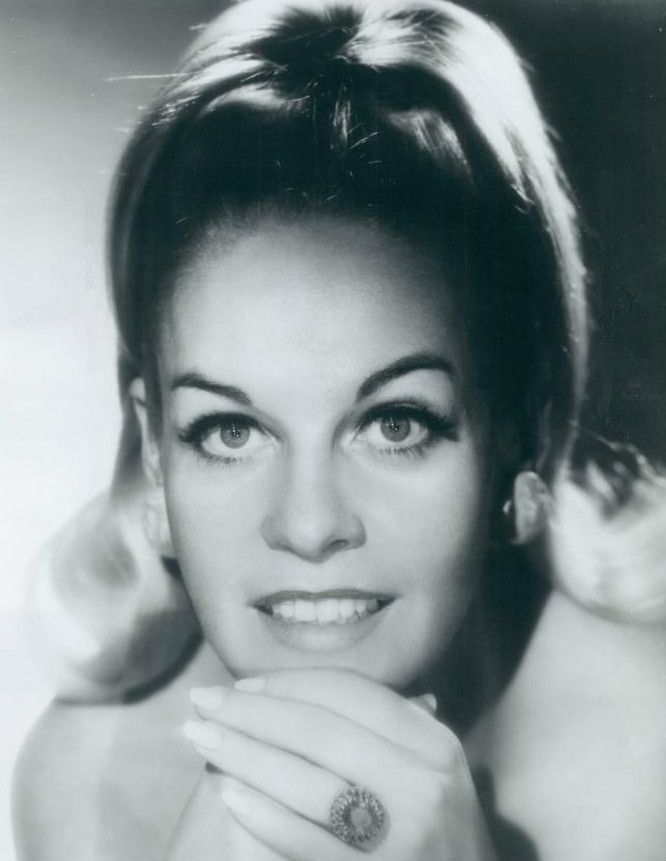
- Morgan in 1968
- Born: Mary Margaret Morgan; December 3, 1931; Mancos, Colorado, U.S.
- Died: August 24, 2026 (aged 94); Longview, Washington, U.S.
- Occupations: Singer, actress
- Years active: 1951–1992

Mary Margaret Morgan (December 3, 1931 – August 24, 2026), known professionally as Jaye P. Morgan, was an American singer, actress and game show panelist.

== Early life ==
Mary Margaret Morgan was born in Mancos, Montezuma County, in far southwestern Colorado on December 3, 1931. Her family moved to California by the time she was in high school. Morgan had six siblings; five brothers and one sister. In the late 1940s, at Verdugo Hills High School in the Tujunga neighborhood of Los Angeles, she served as class treasurer (and got the nickname Jaye P. after the banker J. P. Morgan) and sang at school assemblies, accompanied by her brother on guitar.

== Career ==
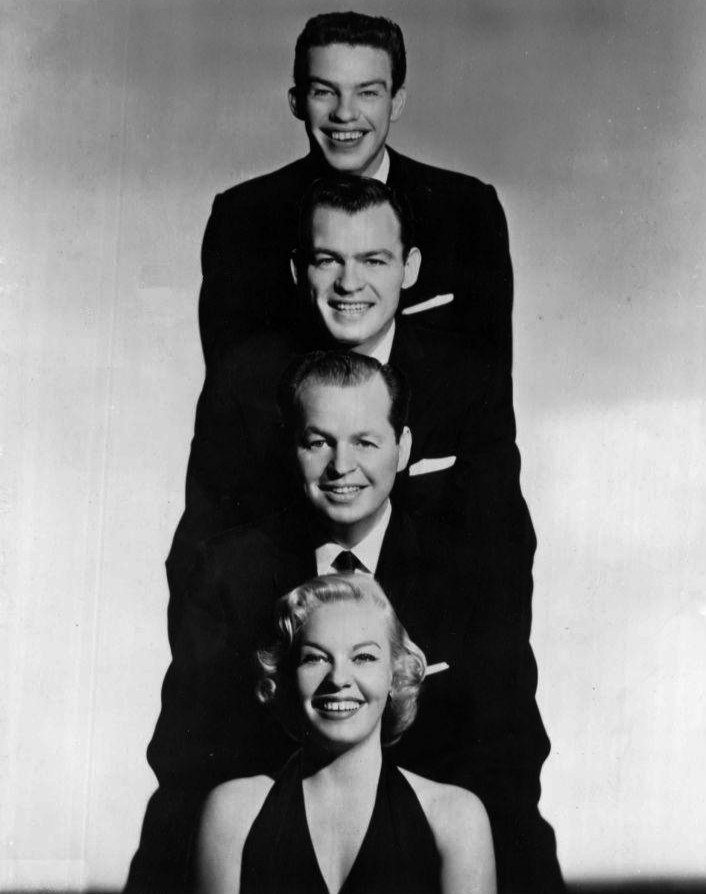
Morgan was not the only vocalist in her family. Three of her brothers were also singers. From top: Duke, Dick, and Charlie with Jaye P., for a 1959 appearance on The Jimmy Dean Show.

In 1953, Morgan made a recording of "Life Is Just a Bowl of Cherries" issued by Derby Records, which made it to #26 on the U.S. Billboard record chart. Soon after, she received an RCA Victor recording contract, and she had five hits in one year, including her biggest hit "That's All I Want from You", which reached #3 on the chart. Her other notable hits included "There's a Dream in My Heart" by Rolande Maxwell Young, "The Longest Walk", and "Pepper Hot Baby". After spending six years with RCA Victor, Morgan joined MGM Records in 1959.

From 1954 to 1955, Morgan was a vocalist on the ABC television series show Stop the Music. In November 1955, the British music magazine, NME, reported that Morgan was the top female vocalist in the U.S. Cash Box poll. Beginning January 11, 1954, she was a featured singer on the Robert Q. Lewis Show on CBS-TV.

In 1956, she had her own show, The Jaye P. Morgan Show, and made guest appearances on a number of other variety shows. She was a charter member of the Robert Q. Lewis "gang" on Lewis's weekday program on CBS, and was featured on a special episode of The Jackie Gleason Show in which Lewis's entire company substituted for the vacationing Gleason. In 1958, Morgan appeared on ABC's Pat Boone Chevy Showroom. On October 6, 1960, she guest starred on NBC's The Ford Show, Starring Tennessee Ernie Ford.

In 1961, Morgan was cast as Sally Dwight in the episode "Money and the Minister" of the CBS anthology series, General Electric Theater, hosted by Ronald Reagan. In 1962, she played Patty Maxwell in "Patti's Tune" of the CBS military sitcom-drama Hennesey, starring Jackie Cooper. That same year, she was cast as Kitty Flanders in "That's Showbiz" on NBC's The Joey Bishop Show. In 1964, she portrayed the character Ruth Evans in the episode "Sunday Father" of the NBC medical drama The Eleventh Hour.

Although Morgan continued to spend considerable time in the 1960s and 1970s performing in nightclubs, she also continued to make additional appearances on television as well as in films. In 1964, she guest-starred on CBS's My Three Sons as Susan Duvall in the episode "Second Chorus" and in 1966 "A Falling Star", playing the fading singer Claudia Farrell. Later, in 1973, Morgan played herself in the episode "The Songwriter" of the sitcom The Odd Couple. That year she also appeared as Magda Valentine in the film The All-American Boy. She performed the theme song, "Coming into My Own", of the short-lived NBC situation comedy Fay, starring Lee Grant, which aired from 1975 to 1976.

In 1978, Morgan guest-starred on The Muppet Show and sang "That Old Black Magic" as a duet with Dr. Teeth. Morgan made numerous appearances on The Tonight Show Starring Johnny Carson during this period, and in the 1980s and into the early 1990s she performed again in movies, working in supportive roles in films such as Loose Shoes (1980), Night Patrol (1984), and Home Alone 2: Lost in New York (1992).

== Game show panelist ==
One of Morgan's first appearances as a game show panelist was on the 1970 pilot for "The Honeymoon Game" (a re-working of earlier pilots for The Joker's Wild). She represented the category of Music on the show, asking questions of the contestants in that category.

From 1976 to 1978, Morgan was a regular panelist on The Gong Show, in which she achieved notoriety for flashing her breasts while on live camera during a Gene, Gene, the Dancing Machine performance. NBC banned her from the program for the flashing incident.

Morgan appeared as herself in Confessions of a Dangerous Mind, a 2003 semi-biographical film about the life of Chuck Barris, creator of The Gong Show, The Dating Game, and The Newlywed Game.

== Personal life and death ==
Morgan was married three times. She was married briefly to Michael Baiano from 1954 to 1955; then to Chuck Kelly, and lastly to Artie Kane, a musician. She had one son, who died in 2020. Morgan died from injuries sustained in a fall at a hospital in Longview, Washington, on August 24, 2026, at the age of 94.

== Discography ==
=== Albums ===
Year	Title	Label and Number
1953	Jaye P. Morgan and Orchestra (10")	Royale 18122
1954	Jaye P. Morgan and Orchestra (10")	Royale 18147
1954	Jaye P. Morgan and Orchestra (10")	Royale 18162
1955	Jaye P. Morgan Sings with Frank DeVol's Orchestra	Allegro Royale 1604
1956	Jaye P. Morgan	RCA Victor LPM-1155
1958	Just You, Just Me	RCA Victor LSP-1682
1959	Slow & Easy	MGM E3774
1960	Up North	MGM E3830
1960	Down South	MGM E3867
1961	That Country Sound	MGM E3940
1962	Life Is Just a Bowl of Cherries	Tops Mayfair 9739
1970	What Are You Doing the Rest of Your Life	Beverly Hills BHS-24
1976	Jaye P. Morgan	Candor C-1001
1983	Lately!	Palace PLP-S6540
1995	Jaye P. Morgan & Kaye Ballard – Long Time Friends	AVL-95320

=== Singles ===
Year	Single (A-side, B-side) Both sides from same album except where indicated	Chart positions			Album
Year	Single (A-side, B-side) Both sides from same album except where indicated	^{U.S.}	^{US Cashbox}	^{U.S. AC}	Album
1953	"Just a Gigolo" b/w "Wasted Tears"	22			Jaye P. Morgan (Rondo-Lette label)
1954	"Life Is Just a Bowl of Cherries" b/w "Operator 299"	26	45		Jaye P. Morgan (Rondo-Lette label)
1954	"Ring Telephone Ring" b/w "Don't Tell Him"				Jaye P. Morgan (Rondo-Lette label)
1954	"Nobody Met the Train" b/w "Life Was Made for Living"				Jaye P. Morgan (Rondo-Lette label)
1954	"I Ain't Got the Man" b/w "Baby Don't Do It"				Jaye P. Morgan (Rondo-Lette label)
1954	"That's All I Want from You" b/w "Dawn"	3	6		Non-album tracks
1955	"Danger! Heartbreak Ahead" /	12	14		Non-album tracks
1955	"Softly Softly"	flip	42		Non-album tracks
1955	"Have You Ever Been Lonely?" b/w "Life Was Made for Living"				The House Of Jaye P. Morgan
1955	"Chee Chee-oo Chee" (with Perry Como) /	12	17		Non-album tracks
1955	"Two Lost Souls" (with Perry Como)	18	26		Non-album tracks
1955	"The Longest Walk" /	6	12		Non-album tracks
1955	"Swanee"	flip	48		Non-album tracks
1955	"Life Is Just a Bowl of Cherries" b/w "Just a Gigolo"				The House of Jaye P. Morgan
1955	"Baby Don't Do It" b/w "Nobody Met the Train"				The House of Jaye P. Morgan
1955	"If You Don't Want My Love" /	12	33		Non-album tracks
1955	"Pepper Hot Baby"	14	19		Non-album tracks
1955	"Not One Goodbye" /	48			Non-album tracks
1955	"My Bewildered Heart"		47		Non-album tracks
1956	"Get Up! Get Up!" /	83			Non-album tracks
1956	"Sweet Lips"	85			Non-album tracks
1956	"Lost in the Shuffle" /	69			Non-album tracks
1956	"Play for Keeps"	79			Non-album tracks
1956	"Johnny Casanova" b/w "The West Point Dress Parade"	81			Non-album tracks
1956	"Just Love Me" b/w "The Call of the Wild"	97			Non-album tracks
1956	"Mutual Admiration Society" b/w "If'n"; Both sides with Eddy Arnold	47	24		Non-album tracks
1957	"I Thought It Was Over" b/w "Pledge Allegiance to Your Heart"				Non-album tracks
1957	"Graduation Ring" b/w "You, You Romeo"				Non-album tracks
1957	"There's a Dream in My Heart" b/w "Take a Chance"				Non-album tracks
1958	"Tell Me More" b/w "My Blind Date"				Non-album tracks
1958	"I Know, I Know, I Know" b/w "I Love You So Much It Hurts"; Both sides with The Morgan Brothers				Non-album tracks
1958	"Star Dust" (with The Morgan Brothers) b/w "Easy Does It"				Non-album tracks
1959	"Are You Lonesome Tonight?" /	65	67		Non-album tracks
1959	"Miss You"	78	63		Non-album tracks
1959	"(It Took) One Kiss" b/w "My Reputation"		70		Non-album tracks
1959	"Somebody Else Is Taking My Place" b/w "Somebody Loses, Somebody Wins"				Non-album tracks
1959	"That Funny Feeling" b/w "Left My Gal in the Mountains"		112		Non-album tracks
1959	"My Darling, My Darling" b/w "Thoughts of Love"				Non-album tracks
1960	"Half as Much" b/w "I Don't Want to Walk Without You"				That Country Sound
1960	"I Wish I Didn't Love You So" b/w "I Understand"				Non-album tracks
1960	"I Walk the Line" b/w "Wondering Where You Are" (Non-album track)	66	55		That Country Sound
1960	"When You Get What You Want" b/w "A World I Can't Live In"				That Country Sound
1961	"Catch Me a Kiss" b/w "Close Your Eyes"				Non-album tracks
1962	"A Heartache Named Johnny" b/w "He Thinks I Still Care"	119			Non-album tracks
1965	"Put a Ring on My Finger" b/w "Life Is Just a Bowl of Cherries"				Non-album tracks
1970	"Love of a Gentle Man" b/w "Billy Sunshine"			37	What Are You Doing the Rest of Your Life
1970	"What Are You Doing the Rest of Your Life" b/w "Applause"			40	What Are You Doing the Rest of Your Life
1970	"I've Got an Awful Lot of Losing You to Do" b/w "He's Too Good For Me"				What Are You Doing the Rest of Your Life
1971	"A Song for You" b/w "Do You Really Have a Heart" (from What Are You Doing the Rest of Your Life)	105	108		Non-album track
