= London Lee =

American comedian (1935–2015)

- Born: Alan Levine; February 4, 1935; United States
- Died: September 29, 2015 (aged 80); Deerfield Beach, Florida, U.S.
- Other names: "Poor Little Rich Kid"
- Occupations: Comedian, TV personality
- Known for: Comedy

London Alan Levine (February 4, 1935 – September 29, 2015), better known as London Lee, was an American stand-up comedian and actor.

== Early life ==
Lee grew up in Closter, New Jersey. He claimed that he was born in London, England while his parents were on vacation, and that he was named after that city. His father was Mike Levine, a wealthy New York garment manufacturer.

After graduating from New York University with a degree in psychology, he began work as a dress salesman for his father's company. He disliked the work and started his own record company, U.S.A. Records, which failed.

After the record venture ended he took a succession of other jobs, including music publisher, personal manager and clothing manufacturer, interspersed with working for his father.

He moved to Los Angeles, working as a cab driver by day and a dishwasher by night. One night he told jokes to a group of friends, and was encouraged to perform on-stage.

== Career ==
His comedy routines were based on his being a kid from a wealthy family, He used to joke that his father was so wealthy that he bought a new yacht "when the old one got wet," that he "wrote out a check so big the bank bounced," and that his house was so large that "when it was 3 o'clock in the kitchen it was 12 o'clock in the bedroom."

Another of his favorite lines was "I was a lonely kid, so my father bought me a German shepherd to play with. Not a dog."

He appeared on The Ed Sullivan Show, in the early 1960s and in 1965, he was signed by United Artists Records to record three comedy albums and a number of singles, the first of which was to be "The Teenage Defender's Marching Song." Lee made more than 200 TV appearances, including 32 on the Sullivan program.

Lee was a favorite guest on the talk-show circuit, appearing 82 times on The Merv Griffin Show, as well as with Johnny Carson, Steve Allen, David Frost, Della Reese, Mike Douglas, Joey Bishop, and Sammy Davis Jr.

In the 1970s, he released a comedy album, The Rich Kid. Some of his material was written by comedy writer, Bob Ellison. He was the comedian hired for the Baldwin, N.Y. Class of 1971 Senior Prom In the 1960s Lee played in celebrity golf tournaments, including the WNEW/Billboard International in 1968.

In his stage appearances, Lee shared the stage with Diana Ross, Ella Fitzgerald, Lou Rawls, Sammy Davis Jr., and other major performers.

Lee had a supporting role in the 1974 film The Gambler, starring James Caan.

He claimed that he was cast in the Woody Allen film Broadway Danny Rose but that his scenes were cut out.

== Personal life and death ==
Lee was divorced three times. In his final years he resided in Deerfield Beach, Florida, where he died in 2015, aged 80. He had at least one daughter, Stacey Lee, who - at one time - lived in Harrington Park, NJ.
