= Suzanne Charny =

American actress and dancer

- Education: High School of Performing Arts
- Occupations: Actress; dancer; sculptor
- Awards: Gypsy Robe
- Website: charnysculptures.com

Suzanne Charny is an American actress, dancer, and sculptor.

== Early years ==
Charny was raised in Brooklyn and attended the High School of Performing Arts in New York City.

== Career ==
When she was 15, Charny skipped school to go to an audition, gaining a role as a "Shark" girl in a production of West Side Story that toured Australia. Her first big break came in early 1965, when she was cast as one of the featured dancers in the weekly NBC musical variety series Hullabaloo, which aired until spring of 1966. In 1967, she guest starred on That Girl as Donald's computer-match "date". She was the lead female dancer in "The Rich Man's Frug" sequence in the original Broadway production of Sweet Charity and reprised the role in the movie version (1969). From 1970 to 1986, she frequently appeared on television shows including The Night Stalker, Kojak, The Rockford Files, Starsky & Hutch, The Incredible Hulk and others.

In 1969, Charny danced in productions for military personnel as part of Bob Hope's annual tour to entertain U. S. troops overseas.

Charny is also a sculptor. Her figural work is based on her career as a dancer and includes representations of dancers in motion. She notes that growing up in Brooklyn, she was inspired to model the human form by watching her father build larger-than-life nude sand sculptures at Brighton Beach.

== Awards and honors ==
Charny was a 2004 recipient of the Professional Dancers Society's Gypsy Robe in honor of her contributions to the field of dance.

== Filmography ==
=== Film ===
Year	Title	Role	Notes
1969	Sweet Charity	Dancer	Musical
1971	The Steagle	Marcy	Comedy film
1986	Hollywood Harry	Marcy (as Suzanne Charney)	Neo-noir
1986	Vasectomy: A Delicate Matter	Mildred (as Suzanne Charnoy)	

=== Television ===
Year	Show	Character	Episode
1967	That Girl	Lisa Stevens	Episode 4 S2 “To Each Her Own “
1970	Bracken's World	Alex Hunter	Episode 5 S2: "Preview in Samarkand"
1973	The Rookies	Boat Owner	Episode 17 S1 "Snow Job"
1973	Emergency!	Mrs. Butler	Episode 18 S2: "Seance"
1973	Ironside	Bev	Episode 23 S6: "A Game of Showdown"
1973	Marcus Welby, M.D.	Luisa Renatti	Episode 4 S5: "Blood Kin"
1974	Toma	Pepper	Episode 18 S1: "The Madam"
1974	Kolchak: The Night Stalker	Catherine Rawlins	Episode 4 S1: "The Vampire"
1974	The Manhunter	Melissa	Episode 12 S1: "The Lodester Ambush"
1975	The Rookies	Linda	Episode 18 S3: "Angel"
1975	Starsky & Hutch	Ginger	Episode 6 S1: "Death Notice"
1975	Barbary Coast	Conchita	Episode 10 S1: "Sharks Eat Sharks"
1976	Kojak	Nina Bruno	Episode 17 S3: "A Wind from Corsica"
1976	The Blue Knight	Adelle	Episode 6 S1: "The Creeper"
1976	The Streets of San Francisco	Sunny Malone	Episode 18 S4: "Underground"
1976	The Rockford Files	Paulette DiMinna	Episode 17 S2: "Joey Blue Eyes"
1977	The Six Million Dollar Man	Dr Tamara Batalova	Episode 20 S4: "The Privacy of the Mind"
1977	The Six Million Dollar Man	Maureen Wright (as Susanne Charny)	Episode 7 S5: "Rollback"
1977	Tabitha	Kathy	Episode 5 S1: "Minerva Goes Straight"
1978	The Bionic Woman	Waitress; Nurse	Episode 14 S3: "The Antidote"
1978	Starsky & Hutch	Gina	Episode 2 S4: "The Game"
1980	Fantasy Island	Marlene McQueen	Episode 17 S3: "PlayGirl / Smith's Valhalla
1981	Quincy M.E.	Nancy Marsala	Episode 10 S6: "Headhunter"
1981	The Incredible Hulk	Barbara Davis	Episode 2 S5: "Two Godmothers"
1986	Capitol	Leslie	(1986)
