= Lana Cantrell =

American lawyer

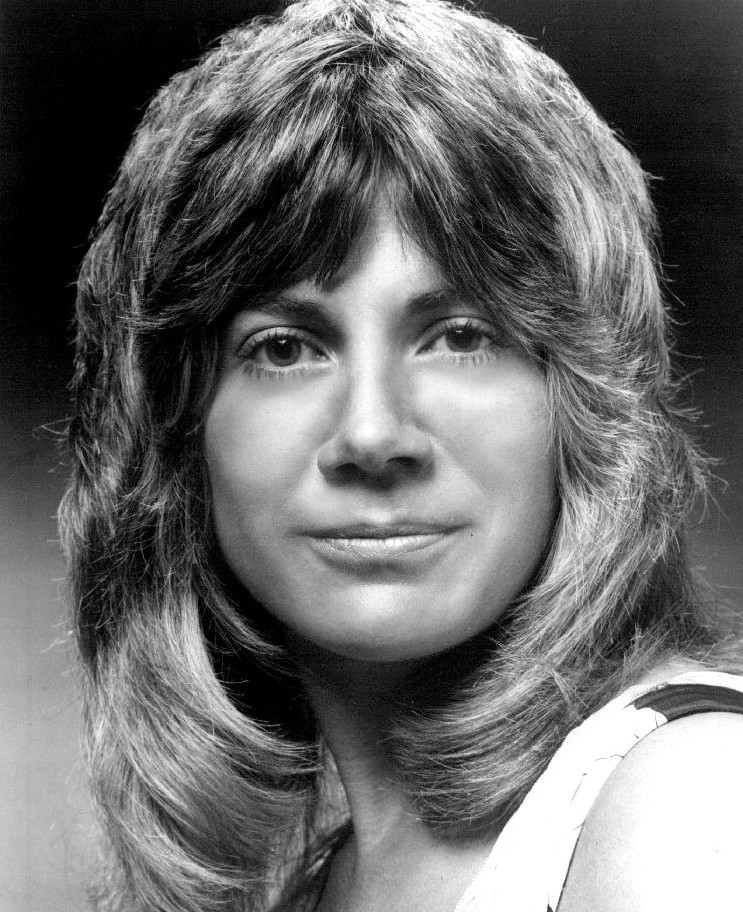
- Cantrell c. 1970s
- Born: Lana Eleanor Cantrell; 7 August 1943 (age 83); Sydney, New South Wales, Australia
- Education: Marymount Manhattan College; Fordham University
- Occupations: Musician; lawyer

Lana Eleanor Cantrell AM (born 7 August 1943) is an Australian-American singer and entertainment lawyer. She was nominated for the Grammy Award for Best New Artist in the Grammy Awards of 1968.

== Music career ==
Cantrell recorded six albums for RCA Victor during the 1960s. Her preferred style of music was pop standards, but she later made contemporary pop rock a significant part of her performances. Cantrell commented in a 1994 profile, "Think of how few people can still make their careers by singing standards.... There's Tony Bennett and Barbra Streisand, and I don't know anyone else."

Cantrell was a frequent guest on television shows including The Ed Sullivan Show, The Tonight Show Starring Johnny Carson, and The Mike Douglas Show. However, she never had a top 40 hit in the Billboard Hot 100, hitting #63 in 1975 with "Like a Sunday Morning".

=== Television ===
Year	Title	Role	Type
1961-1963; 1966	Bandstand	Guest - Herself/Performer	TV series Australia, 5 episodes
1965	Gypsy	Herself	TV series US, 2 episodes
1966	The Pat Boone Show	Herself - Singer/Performer	TV series US, 2 episodes
1966-1971	The Ed Sullivan Show	Guest - Herself/Singer	TV series US, 13 episodes
1966-1977	The Mike Douglas Show	Guest Singer	TV series US, 7 episodes
1967; 1970	The Hollywood Palace	Herself - Singer	TV series US, 2 episodes
1967	The Steve Allen Comedy Hour	Herself - Musical Guest	TV series US, 1 episode
1967	Spotlight	Herself	TV series US, 1 episode
1967; 1968	The Red Skelton Show	Herself - Guest Singer	TV series US, 2 episodes
1967-1977	The Tonight Show with Johnny Carson	Guest - Herself/Singer	TV series US, 24 episodes
1968; 1972	The Dick Cavett Show	Guest - Herself	TV series US, 2 episodes
1968	The Jonathan Winters Show	Herself - Guest	TV series US, 1 episode
1968	The Joey Bishop Show	Herself	TV series US, 2 episodes
1968	The Kraft Music Hall	Herself	TV series US, 2 episodes
1969	The John Davidson Show	Guest Singer	TV series UK, 1 episode
1970	The Engelbert Humperdinck Show	Guest - Herself	TV series UK, 1 episode
1972	The Bob Braun Show	Herself - Guest Singer	TV series US, 1 episode
1973	The Graham Kennedy Show	Guest - Herself sings	TV series Australia, 1 episode
1973; 1975	The Mike Walsh Show	Guest Singer	TV series Australia, 2 episodes
1975	The Don Lane Show	Guest - Herself/Singer	TV series Australia, 1 episode
1975	The Merv Griffin Show	Guest - Herself	TV series US, 1 episode
1976	Dinah!	Guest - Herself	TV series US, 1 episode
1977	This Is Your Life: Peter Allen	Guest - Herself	TV series Australia, 1 episode
1981	Ryan's Hope	Herself	TV series US, 1 episode
1982	Cabaret with Martin Schaffer	Guest - Herself	TV series US, 1 episode
1992	Peter Allen: The Boy from Oz	Herself	TV special US/Australia
1996	The South Bank Show	Herself	TV series UK, 1 episode
2001	This Is Your Life: Trisha Noble	Guest - Herself	TV series Australia, 1 episode

== Transition to law career ==
Cantrell eventually decided to make a transition out of music in the 1980s due to a decline in the number of venues where she could sing in her preferred style, the size of her audiences, and her working conditions. Although she had once been able to tour at supper clubs that would furnish a 20-piece orchestra for her and her conductor, in later years she toured with only a five-piece band that she had to pay herself. She decided to pursue a law career in part because a former manager had spent much of her earnings over the years and she wanted to protect other performers from similar experiences.

In 1986, Cantrell enrolled at Marymount Manhattan College, where she majored in history. After receiving her bachelor's degree, she attended Fordham University School of Law. After graduation, she began practicing law with the firm of Ballon Stoll Bader & Nadler in New York City.

In 2019, Cantrell's license to practice law in the state of New York was suspended due to an undisclosed medical condition. Before having her license suspended, she operated a private practice in Mattituck, NY.

== Honours and awards ==
In 1966, Cantrell won the Amber Nightingale award for singing at a festival in Sopot, Poland.

In 2003, Cantrell was named a member of the Order of Australia. The honour was conferred for "service to the entertainment industry, and for assistance to the Australian community in New York."

== Personal life ==
It was reported in 1973 that Cantrell was engaged to Australian television personality Graham Kennedy. This turned out to be a hoax. Kennedy later claimed that his romance with Cantrell was purely an invention of the Sunday Observer, although Kennedy himself had confirmed publicly at the time that the relationship was real. Judy Carne, of Rowan & Martin's Laugh-In claimed she had a love affair with Cantrell.

== Discography ==
=== Albums ===
- And Then There Was Lana, RCA Victor LSP-3755, 1967
- Another Shade of Lana, RCA Victor LSP-3862, 1967
- Act III, RCA Victor LSP-3947, 1968
- Lana!, RCA Victor LSP-4026, 1968 (No. 166 US)
- The Now of Then, RCA Victor LSP-4121, 1969
- The 6th of Lana, RCA Victor LSP-4263, 1969
- The Best of Lana Cantrell, RCA ANL1-1049, 1975

=== Eps ===
- Introducing Lana Cantrell, REX, 1961
- Australia’s Great Talent, FESTIVAL FX-11,327, ????

== Reissues ==
Beginning in 2017, Lana Cantrell's RCA Victor albums have been reissued for the first time on compact disc in Hi-Res audio, replacing years of poor quality bootlegs on YouTube. Her six studio albums have been reissued from 2017 to 2019. All reissues were published by the RCA-Legacy label. Singles or B-sides that did not appear on her albums are not available at the moment.
