= Marty Brill (comedian) =

American comedian (1932–2021)

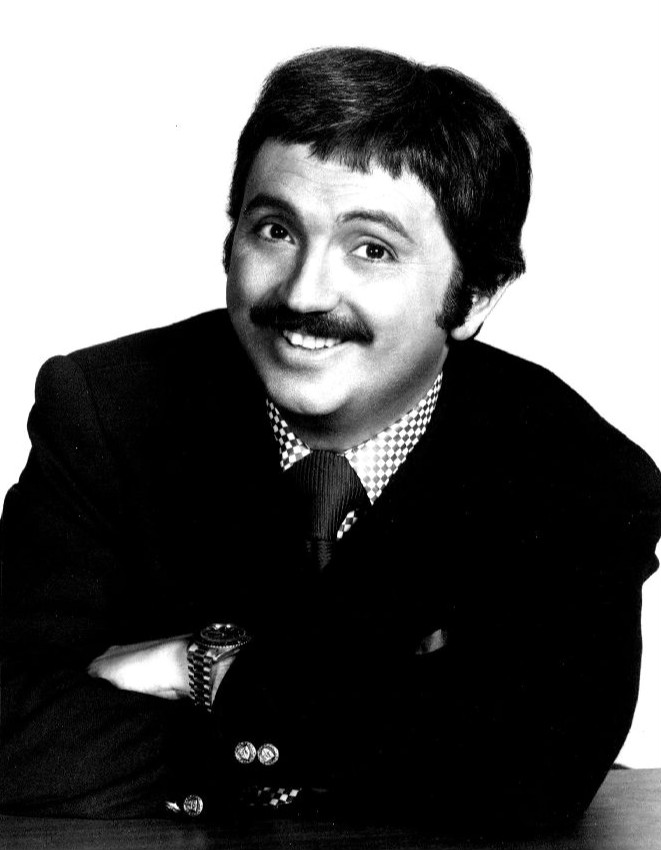
- Brill in 1971 publicity photo
- Born: May 6, 1932; Chicago, Illinois, U.S.
- Died: January 23, 2021 (aged 88)
- Occupations: Actor, comedian, comedy writer, musician
- Years active: 1951–2021
- Spouse: Olina Brill

Martin S. Brill (May 6, 1932 – January 23, 2021) was an American comedian, writer, actor and musician who appeared regularly on 1960s and 1970s TV in both variety shows (The Ed Sullivan Show, The Merv Griffin Show, The Tonight Show) and sitcoms (The New Dick Van Dyke Show, The Mary Tyler Moore Show). In the late 1970s, Marty Brill did some writing in the 1970s for the "New Soupy Sales Show," also occasionally playing characters on the show, especially after Soupy's longtime sidekick (Clyde Adler) took ill during production of the series.

Brill was the lyricist for the short-lived 1964 Broadway musical Cafe Crown. For the 1977 film Raggedy Ann & Andy: A Musical Adventure he voiced King Koo Koo and sang one of the film's songs.

Brill was born in Chicago, Illinois, on May 6, 1932, and died on January 23, 2021, at the age of 88.

== Discography ==
- The Roving Balladeer
- "Timber"
- James Blonde ("The Man From T.A.N.T.E.") (No. 93 US)

He was involved with a comedy album called "The Other Family". This was a take-off on "The First Family" but about the Khrushchevs in the Kremlin.

He dubbed The Six Shooter into Japanese - mentioned on SiriusXM Radio Classics.

== Filmography ==
Year	Title	Role	Notes
1969	Angel, Angel, Down We Go	Maitre D'	
1977	Raggedy Ann & Andy: A Musical Adventure	King Koo Koo	Voice
1984	The Pope of Greenwich Village	Mel	
1985	Basic Training	General Strombs	
1987	Talking Walls	Floyd	(final film role)
