= Carol Wayne =

American actress (1942–1985)

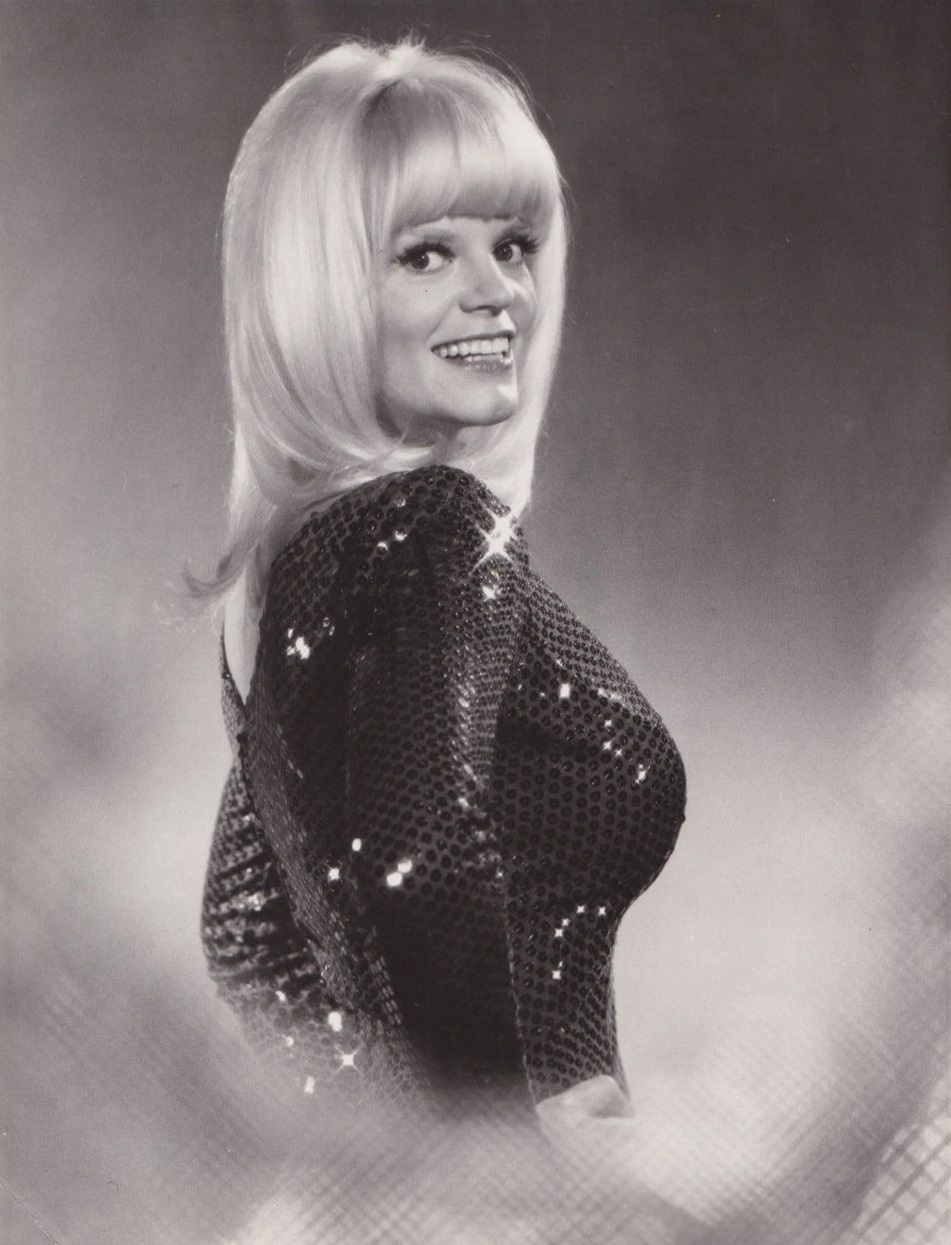
- Wayne in The Tonight Show Starring Johnny Carson, 1973
- Born: Carol Marie Wayne; September 6, 1942; Chicago, Illinois, U.S.
- Died: January 13, 1985 (aged 42); Manzanillo, Colima, Mexico
- Occupation: Actress
- Years active: 1966–1985
- Spouses: Loreto Cera (m. 1965; div. 1967) Barry Feinstein (m. 1969; div. 1974) Burt Sugarman (m. 1975; div. 1980)
- Children: 1 (1970)
- Relatives: Nina Wayne (sister)

Carol Marie Wayne (September 6, 1942 – January 13, 1985) was an American television and film actress. She appeared regularly on The Tonight Show Starring Johnny Carson as the Matinee Lady in the Art Fern's Tea Time Movie sketches.

== Early life ==
Born in Chicago, Wayne began her show business career as a teenaged figure skater in the Ice Capades, along with her younger sister, Nina.

== Career ==
Wayne did television guest shots on The Man from U.N.C.L.E., I Spy (as the title character in the episode "Trouble with Temple"), Bewitched (as a rabbit turned into a cocktail bunny), I Dream of Jeannie (as dim-witted starlet Bootsie Nightingale), Love American Style, Emergency! and The Fall Guy, and appeared on The Midnight Special and in many sketches on The Red Skelton Show.

Wayne said she was "discovered" at a Hollywood party and auditioned for The Tonight Show after appearances as a Las Vegas chorus line dancer.

She gained her greatest fame for appearances (1967–1984) on The Tonight Show, including 100-plus appearances (1971–1984) as the buxom Matinée Lady on The Tonight Show in Johnny Carson's popular Art Fern's Tea Time Movie sketches, which were filled with sexual double entendres. After her death (which occurred exactly one year after her last appearance on The Tonight Show), Carson kept the Art Fern character off the air for most of the next year. He eventually hired Danuta Wesley and later Teresa Ganzel to be his new Matinée Lady.

Wayne made appearances on several game shows during the 1970s including Mantrap and Hollywood Squares. She was a regular panelist on Celebrity Sweepstakes. She landed roles in several films, including Gunn, The Party (both directed by Blake Edwards), Scavenger Hunt, Savannah Smiles and Surf II. Her final onscreen appearance came in the 1984 drama Heartbreakers, for which she received the best reviews of her career. Critic Roger Ebert wrote, "Her performance is so good, so heartbreaking, if you will, that it pulls the whole movie together."

In February 1984, Wayne appeared nude in a pictorial for Playboy magazine. The same year, she filed for bankruptcy.

== Personal life ==
Wayne was married three times. She married her first husband, Loreto "Larry" Cera, on May 1, 1965; they divorced in June 1967. In 1969, Wayne married her second husband, rock-music photographer Barry Feinstein, with whom she had a son, Alex Feinstein (b. 1970). The couple divorced in 1974. A year later, she married television and film producer Burt Sugarman, who served as producer on Celebrity Sweepstakes. They divorced in 1980.

Wayne told Johnny Carson in an interview on April 30, 1974, one of 38 appearances, that she enjoyed gardening and growing bonsai trees, and in another interview, breeding Andalusian horses.

== Death ==
In January 1985, Wayne vacationed at the Las Hadas Resort in Manzanillo, Colima, Mexico, with companion Edward Durston, a car salesman. After an argument, Wayne reportedly took a walk on the beach. (See also Diane Linkletter.) Three days later, a local fisherman found Wayne's body in a shallow bay. An autopsy performed in Mexico revealed no signs of alcohol or other drugs in her body, and her death was ruled "accidental."

== Filmography ==
Film
Year	Title	Role	Notes
1967	Gunn	Ernestine	
1968	The Party	June Warren	
1979	Scavenger Hunt	Nurse	
1980	Gypsy Angels	Waitress	
1982	Savannah Smiles	Doreen	
1984	Surf II	Mrs. O'Finlay	Alternative title: Surf II: The End of the Trilogy
1984	Heartbreakers	Candy	
1984	E. Nick: A Legend in His Own Mind	Regine	

Television
Year	Title	Role	Notes
1966	The Man from U.N.C.L.E	Ginger LaVeer	Episode: "The Super-Colossal Affair"
1966	The Girl from U.N.C.L.E.	Shelia	Episode: "The Faustus Affair"
1967	I Spy	Temple	Episode: "The Trouble with Temple"
1967	Occasional Wife	Miss Orange Grove	Episode: "The New Secretary"
1967	I Dream of Jeannie	Bootsie Nightingale	Episode: "Here Comes Bootsie Nightingale"
1969	Bewitched	Bunny	Episode: "A Bunny for Tabitha"
1970	The Red Skelton Show	NBC Soundstage Tour Guide; Chambermaid	Episodes: "The Magic Act" "The Private Detective"
1970–1972	Love, American Style	Various	6 episodes
1971	Sarge	Receptionist	Episode: "Psst! Wanna Buy a Dirty Picture?"
1971	The Bold Ones: The Lawyers	Christie Mullins	Episode: "The Letter of the Law"
1971–1984	The Tonight Show Starring Johnny Carson	Art Fern's Tea-Time Movie Lady	Multiple appearances at irregular intervals.
1972	Mannix	Bobbi	Episode: "A Puzzle for One"
1972	Every Man Needs One	Nancy	ABC Movie of the Week
1973	The Girl with Something Extra	Mimi	Episode: "John & Sally & Fred & Linda"
1974	Medical Center	Blanche	Episode: "Adults Only"
1974	Emergency!	Renee, Miss October	Episode: "The Screenwriter"
1974–1976	Celebrity Sweepstakes	Herself (regular panelist)	Television game show
1979	Whew!	Herself (celebrity player)	Television game show
1979	Heaven on Earth		Television movie
1981	The Big Black Pill	Allegra Farrenpour	Television movie
1981	The Fall Guy	Rose	Episodes: "The Meek Shall Inherit Rhonda" "Japanese Connection"
