= David Frye =

American comedian (1933–2011)

- David Frye featured on his album, Richard Nixon: A Fantasy
- Born: David Shapiro; November 21, 1933; New York City, United States
- Died: January 24, 2011 (aged 77); Las Vegas, Nevada
- Notable work: I Am the President; Richard Nixon: A Fantasy

Comedy career
- Years active: 1956−2010

David Frye (born David Shapiro, November 21, 1933 – January 24, 2011) was an American comedian, specializing in comic imitations of famous political figures, most of whom were based on notable Americans, including former U.S. Presidents Lyndon B. Johnson and Richard Nixon, Vice Presidents Hubert Humphrey, Spiro Agnew, and Nelson Rockefeller, and Senator Bobby Kennedy, as well as film celebrities, e.g., George C. Scott, Henry Fonda, Kirk Douglas, Robert Mitchum, Jack Nicholson, Jack Palance and Rod Steiger, and media figures, e.g., William F. Buckley Jr. and Larry King.

However, as eerily accurate and subtle as his impersonations were, the comedic narratives spoken by those depicted by Frye were outrageously à propos as well as politically savvy and au courant. For example, in one narrative, Frye had newly elected Nixon and his wife visit the White House just prior to assuming residency there in 1969. The incumbent Johnson answers the doorbell, oblivious as to the identity of his unannounced visitors, misidentifying them even after introductions have been made:

[Doorbell rings]
Johnson: "I'll get it, Lady Bird! Who's there?"
Nixon: "It's Dick and Pat."
Johnson (shouting): "It's Pick 'n Pat!"
Nixon: "No, it's Dick and Pat: The President Elect ... and Mrs. Elect."
Johnson: "I understand."
Johnson (shouting back): "Company comin' up, Lady Bird! Beautify yourself!"

Another, from a February 1971 appearance on NBC's Kraft Music Hall, had him appearing in two segments. In the first, he portrayed Humphrey as a drug store owner (harkening back to Humphrey's original vocation) being interviewed by show host Eddy Arnold. The latter segment had Frye impersonating Nixon, William F. Buckley, Jr., George Jessel, Truman Capote and Liberace at a Valentine's Day party. Frye often keyed off President Nixon's own catchphrases ("Let me make one thing perfectly clear", or Kennedy's ("Let me say this about that".)

In 1973, Frye's album, Richard Nixon: A Fantasy, which dealt with Nixon's Watergate troubles, developed marketing problems when all three network affiliates in New York City (WNBC-TV, WABC-TV and WCBS-TV) rejected commercials promoting the album, citing questions of taste. In addition, the Woolworth's department store chain decided not to stock the record because, in their words, "some of our customers might be offended."

Although his heyday was in the 1960s and early 1970s, when his Nixon and Lyndon B. Johnson impersonations were definitive, Frye continued to create masterful new impressions and evolve old ones. His 1998 album Clinton: An Oral History featured riffs on Bill Clinton, Al Gore, Pat Buchanan, and John McLaughlin, plus that of an older Nixon (complete with pauses and phrasing more typical of the ex-President as he sounded in the 1980s and 1990s).

== Death ==
David Frye died on January 24, 2011, at his home in Las Vegas, Nevada of cardiopulmonary arrest according to the Clark County Coroner.

== Discography ==
As featured artist:

- Clinton: An Oral History (1998)
- Frye Is Nixon (1996)
- David Frye Presents The Great Debate (1980)
- Richard Nixon: A Fantasy (1973)
- Richard Nixon Superstar (1971)
- Radio Free Nixon (1971) (re-released in compilation 2006)
- I Am The President (1969) (re-released in compilation 2006)

As player:

- Bob Booker & George Foster Present The New First Family, 1968: A Futuristic Fairy Tale (1966)

== Impersonated public figures ==
- Spiro Agnew
- Muhammad Ali
- John B. Anderson
- Humphrey Bogart
- Marlon Brando
- David Brinkley
- Tom Brokaw
- Pat Buchanan
- William F. Buckley, Jr.
- Raymond Burr
- Richard Burton
- George H. W. Bush
- George W. Bush
- James Cagney
- James Callaghan
- Truman Capote
- Al Capp
- Jimmy Carter
- Dick Cheney
- Jean Chrétien
- Bill Clinton
- Howard Cosell
- Walter Cronkite
- Richard J. Daley
- Sammy Davis, Jr.
- Bob Dole
- Kirk Douglas
- Michael Dukakis
- Dwight D. Eisenhower
- Gerald Ford
- William Fulbright
- Henry Fonda
- Al Gore
- Billy Graham
- Edward Heath
- Hubert Humphrey
- Wolfman Jack
- Jesse Jackson
- Peter Jennings
- George Jessel
- Lyndon Johnson
- Boris Karloff
- Bobby Kennedy
- John F. Kennedy
- Ted Kennedy
- Larry King
- Henry Kissinger
- James Mason
- George McGovern
- John McLaughlin
- Robert Mitchum
- Walter Mondale
- Brian Mulroney
- Ed Muskie
- Jack Nicholson
- Richard Nixon
- Jack Palance
- Lester B. Pearson
- Gregory Peck
- Ross Perot
- Dan Quayle
- Dan Rather
- Ronald Reagan
- Don Rickles
- Pat Robertson
- Nelson Rockefeller
- George C. Scott
- O. J. Simpson
- Rod Steiger
- David Susskind
- Jimmy Swaggart
- Pierre Trudeau
- George Wallace
- Harold Wilson
- Walter Winchell
