= Milt Kamen =

American actor (1921–1977)

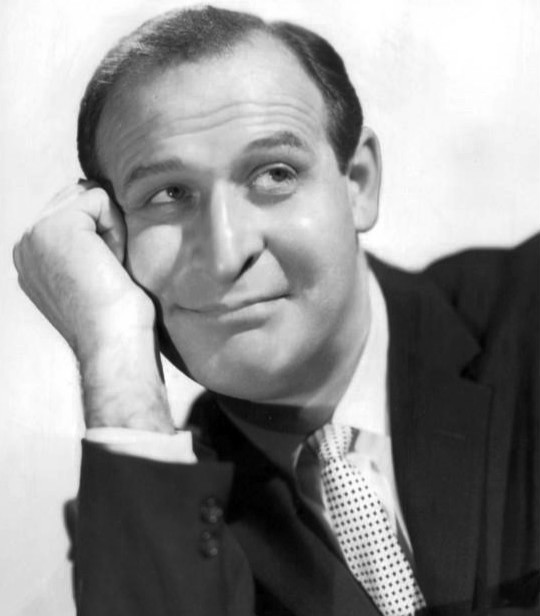
- Kamen in 1966.
- Born: Milton Kaiman; March 5, 1921; Hurleyville, New York
- Died: February 24, 1977 (aged 55); Beverly Hills, California
- Occupation: Comedian
- Spouse: Margot Bankoff (m. 1969)

Milton Kaiman (March 5, 1921 – February 24, 1977), better known as Milt Kamen, was an American stand-up comic and actor with numerous television credits. As a stand-up comic, Kamen was a favorite of Mel Brooks, Groucho Marx and Woody Allen. According to writer Kliph Nesteroff, Kamen worked as a stand-in for Sid Caesar on Caesar's Hour, inventing bits of business that Caesar claimed for his own.

== Life and career ==
Born in Hurleyville, New York, his family moved to the Brownsville neighborhood in Brooklyn, New York when he was two years old. Kamen began his comedy career as a regular on Caesar's Hour in 1954. He frequently performed his comedy routines on shows hosted by Ed Sullivan, Steve Allen, Perry Como, Merv Griffin, Mike Douglas, and Johnny Carson and made guest appearances on Funny You Should Ask (1968), What's My Line?, The Match Game, Tattletales, Pantomime Quiz, The Gong Show, Personality, Password, Missing Links, You're Putting Me On, To Tell the Truth, The $10,000 Pyramid and The Hollywood Palace. While performing at a resort in the Catskills, Kamen discovered Woody Allen.

As an actor, Kamen appeared in Route 66, Naked City, Ben Casey, McMillan & Wife, Love, American Style, The Partridge Family, Mannix, The Streets of San Francisco, and Quincy M.E., among others. His feature film credits include Me, Natalie, The Out-of-Towners, Mother, Jugs & Speed and W.C. Fields and Me.

Kamen's Broadway theatre credits were as a garrulous waiter in an Off Broadway production of William Saroyan's “Across the Board on Tomorrow Morning;” “A Thurber Carnival,” Murray Schisgal's “The Typist and The Tiger,” and in “The Passion of Josef D.” the 1964 Paddy Chayefsky play, in which he played opposite Luther Adler and Peter Falk. It closed after one preview and 16 performances.

Before beginning his comedy career, Kamen was a Juilliard-trained French Horn player and played in the Metropolitan Opera Orchestra.

Kamen died of a heart attack at the age of 55 in Beverly Hills.

== Filmography ==
Year	Title	Role	Notes
1969	Me, Natalie	Plastic Surgeon	
1970	The Out-of-Towners	Counterman	Uncredited
1971	Believe in Me	Physician	
1973	Group Marriage	Justice of the Peace	
1973	This Is a Hijack	Phillips	
1976	W.C. Fields and Me	Dave Chasen	
1976	Mother, Jugs & Speed	Barney	
