= List of The Tonight Show Starring Johnny Carson episodes (1980) =

- No. of episodes: 197

Release
- Original network: NBC

Season chronology
- ← Previous; 1979 episodes Next → 1981 episodes

The following is a list of episodes of the television series The Tonight Show Starring Johnny Carson which aired in 1980: In October, 1962 Johnny Carson took over as host of the show from the previous host Jack Paar.

== 1980 ==
=== January ===
No.	Original release date	Guest(s)	Musical/entertainment guest(s)
4333	January 2, 1980	Karl Malden, Teri Garr	Eubie Blake, Mel Tillis
Desk - "Most Intriguing People"
4334	January 3, 1980	George Burns, David Horowitz	Johnny Mathis
Desk - "Tonight Show Time Capsule"
4335	January 4, 1980	Robert Blake, Martin Mull, Dorothy Mays, Tom Wolfe	N/A
Desk - "Veteran Personalities Who Are Still Employed"
4336	January 7, 1980	Richard Dawson (guest host), Jack Klugman, Barbi Benton, Pete Barbutti, Dr. Michael Fox	N/A
4337	January 8, 1980	none	N/A
4338	January 9, 1980	Cloris Leachman, Robby Benson, Argus Hamilton, Sydney Goldsmith	N/A
Desk - "The Book of Failures"
4339	January 10, 1980	Phyllis George, Mike Farrell, Sean Morey, Jerzy Kosinski	N/A
Carnac the Magnificent
4340	January 11, 1980	Lauren Bacall, David Steinberg	Eubie Blake
Commercial Blackouts: "Paul Gasson Wine", "Beritol Vitamins", "V-8 Juice" and "Circle One, Two, Three, And Four Dog Food".
4341	January 14, 1980	Martin Mull (guest host), Bea Arthur, Billy Crystal	Rita Moreno
4342	January 15, 1980	Tony Randall, Joe Namath, Stephanie Faracy	N/A
4343	January 16, 1980	Tony Randall	N/A
Edge of Wetness
4344	January 17, 1980	Tom Snyder, James Woods, Bert Convy	Benny Goodman
Desk - "1980 Psychics Predictions"
4345	January 18, 1980	Bob Hope, Angie Dickinson, Bud Greenspan	Melissa Manchester
Sketch - "Super Bowl Interview"
4346	January 21, 1980	Kenny Rogers (guest host), Bob Hope, Gallagher, Sandy Duncan	Larry Gatlin
4347	January 22, 1980	David Letterman (guest host), Vince Ferragamo, Marvin Hamlisch, Wayne Rogers	Rupert Holmes
4348	January 23, 1980	David Letterman (guest host), Jose Feliciano, Meadowlark Lemon	Ben Vereen, Linda Lavin
4349	January 24, 1980	David Letterman (guest host), Ralph Nader	Sarah Vaughan, Jim Stafford
4350	January 25, 1980	George Carlin (guest host), Ricky Schroder	Bernadette Peters, Donna Summer
4351	January 28, 1980	Bill Cosby (guest host), Arnold Schwarzenegger, George Gobel	Lola Falana
4352	January 29, 1980	none	N/A
4353	January 30, 1980	Candice Bergen	Mac Davis
Desk - "The Rule Book"
4354	January 31, 1980	Michael Landon, Jim Fowler, Dr. Paul Ehrlich	Donna Theodore
Desk - "Who's in Charge Here?"

=== February ===
No.	Original release date	Guest(s)	Musical/entertainment guest(s)
4355	February 1, 1980	Bob Hope, Teri Garr	Ray Charles
Floyd R. Turbo- "Against Televised Presidential Debates"
4356	February 4, 1980	Bill Cosby (guest host), Valerie Harper	N/A
4357	February 5, 1980	McLean Stevenson, Tom Dreesen, Henry T. Smith	Natalie Cole, Peabo Bryson
Desk- "Unusual Expenditures Made by The Government"
4358	February 6, 1980	Mariette Hartley, Rodney Dangerfield, Dr. Lendon Smith	Robert Goulet
Desk- "Famous People with February Birthdays"
4359	February 7, 1980	Lucille Ball, Kelly Monteith, Dick Enberg	N/A
Sketch- "Groundhog Interview"
4360	February 8, 1980	Bob Hope, Marsha Mason, Merie Earle	Nell Carter ("Mean to Me", "Cash for Your Trash")
Desk- "NBC Newsline"
4361	February 11, 1980	Rich Little (guest host), Dick Shawn, Natalie Wood	N/A
4362	February 12, 1980	Patrick Duffy, Red Buttons, Ann Reinking, William F. Buckley Jr.	N/A
Desk- "Sayings of the Ayatollah Khomeini"
4363	February 13, 1980	Steve Martin, Lynn Redgrave, Bob Newhart	Linda Hopkins
Desk- "Valentine's Cards"
4364	February 14, 1980	Ali MacGraw, Doug Henning, Phil Donahue	Pat Boone
Sketch- "Dan Cupid Interview"
4365	February 15, 1980	Beau Bridges, Calvin Trillin	Dionne Warwick
Desk- "Edison's Less Famous Inventions"
4366	February 18, 1980	Roy Clark (guest host), Suzanne Somers, Kreskin	Tammy Wynette
4367	February 19, 1980	Alan King, George Segal	Beverly Hills Unlisted Jazz Band
Desk- "How To Throw a Party"
4368	February 20, 1980	Dom DeLuise, Johnny Yune, Lauren Hutton	Mel Tillis
Carnac the Magnificent
4369	February 21, 1980	Loni Anderson, Steve Landesberg, Bill Underwood	Engelbert Humperdinck
Sketch- "Waiting For a Bus at Olympics"; 'Who Is Bert Parks?' Letters
4370	February 22, 1980	Dean Martin, Florence Henderson, Kurt Thomas	N/A
Sketch- "George Washington Press Conference"
4371	February 25, 1980	David Letterman (guest host), John Ritter, Irving Wallace	N/A
4372	February 26, 1980	William Devane, Sydney Goldsmith, David Horowitz	Buddy Rich
Edge of Wetness
4373	February 27, 1980	David Steinberg, Oliver Reed	Anita O'Day, Jim Stafford
Desk- "Celebrities' Baby Pictures"
4374	February 28, 1980	Robert Blake, Charlie Callas, Bambi Lin Finney / Ray Johnson	James Galway
4375	February 29, 1980	Joan Embery, Helen Shaver, Jerry Weissman	Anthony Newley
Political Blackouts- (Johnny as Brezhnev with a new Afghanistan leader- a ventriloquist dummy, as Carter, as a Congressman, and Walter Cronkite.)

=== March ===
No.	Original release date	Guest(s)	Musical/entertainment guest(s)
4376	March 3, 1980	David Brenner (guest host), Diana Canova, Vincent Price	N/A
4377	March 4, 1980	David Brenner (guest host), Milton Berle, Steve Guttenberg	Pink Lady
4378	March 5, 1980	David Brenner (guest host), Stephanie Faracy, Pete Hamill	Charo
4379	March 6, 1980	David Brenner (guest host), Susan Anton, William Conrad, Dr. Michael Fox	The Hudson Brothers
4380	March 7, 1980	David Brenner (guest host), Bob Hope, Ricardo Montalbán	N/A
4381	March 17, 1980	Martin Mull (guest host), Rob Reiner, Betty White, Joseph Wambaugh	N/A
4382	March 19, 1980	Sammy Davis Jr., Tim Conway, Julia Child	Pete Fountain
4383	March 20, 1980	Suzanne Somers, Billy Crystal	Loretta Lynn
Desk- "The Celebration of Spring"
4384	March 21, 1980	Bert Convy, Jean Marsh, Erma Bombeck	The Manhattan Transfer
Floyd R. Turbo- "Spending Tax Dollars on HEW"
4385	March 24, 1980	Rich Little (guest host), Kip Addotta	N/A
4386	March 26, 1980	Henry Fonda, Fernando Lamas, Lacey Neuhaus	Crystal Gayle
Carnac the Magnificent
4387	March 27, 1980	Joe Namath, Andy Lipkins	Judith Blegen, Mac Davis
4388	March 28, 1980	William Holden, Carl Reiner	Steve Lawrence
4389	March 31, 1980	David Letterman (guest host), tax expert Paul Strassels	N/A

=== April ===
No.	Original release date	Guest(s)	Musical/entertainment guest(s)
4390	April 2, 1980	Teri Garr	Buddy Rich, Tony Bennett
Desk- "Tips When Being Audited"
4391	April 3, 1980	Joan Rivers, Dick Van Patten, Byron Allen, Stephanie Faracy	N/A
Desk- "Spring Cleaning"; Johnny also reads an April Fools' Day joke from a newspaper from Iowa which had a story about the construction of a Johnny Carson Retirement Center.
4392	April 4, 1980	Tony Randall, Lou Ferrigno, Bill Underwood	Melissa Manchester
Mighty Carson Art Players- "Census Blackouts"
4393	April 7, 1980	David Letterman (guest host), Don Rickles, Bob Uecker	N/A
4394	April 9, 1980	Suzanne Pleshette, Wally Lattimer	N/A
Desk- "Questions From The Long Census Form"
4395	April 10, 1980	Jack Klugman, David Letterman, Tom Wolfe	N/A
Desk- "Reader's Poll"
4396	April 11, 1980	Angie Dickinson, George Miller, Nedra Volz	Liza Minnelli ("I'm Old-Fashioned")
Stump the Band
4397	April 14, 1980	Bob Newhart (guest host), Richard Benjamin, Betty White	N/A
Desk- "Oscars Predictions"
4398	April 15, 1980	Bob Newhart (guest host), Walter Matthau, Charles Nelson Reilly	Larry Gatlin
4399	April 16, 1980	George Carlin (guest host), Valerie Harper, Phyllis Diller	N/A
4400	April 17, 1980	George Carlin (guest host), Carol Lawrence, Sal Viscuso	Marlene Ricci
4401	April 18, 1980	George Carlin (guest host), Roger Moore, Bonnie Franklin	Pat Boone
4402	April 21, 1980	Richard Dawson (guest host), Shecky Greene, Sandy Duncan	Bill Anderson (singer)
4403	April 22, 1980	Richard Dawson (guest host), Steve Allen, Judy Collins	Orson Bean
4404	April 23, 1980	Richard Dawson (guest host), Debralee Scott	Robert Goulet
4405	April 24, 1980	Richard Dawson (guest host), Dr. Joyce Brothers	Bernadette Peters, Mel Tormé
Desk- "Stopper Questions"
4406	April 25, 1980	Bert Convy (guest host), Harvey Korman	Lola Falana
4407	April 28, 1980	Joan Rivers (guest host), Judd Hirsch, Loni Anderson, Judd Hirsch	N/A
4408	April 30, 1980	Wally Mohrman, Charlton Heston, Bobby Kelton, Dorothy Stratten	N/A
Desk- "101 Ways To Save Money"

=== May ===
No.	Original release date	Guest(s)	Musical/entertainment guest(s)
4409	May 1, 1980	Shelley Winters, Susan George, Eric Heiden	N/A
4410	May 2, 1980	Michael Landon, Steve Landesberg, Dr. Lendon Smith	Phyllis Hyman
Mighty Carson Art Players- "Big D" (Dallas parody)
4411	May 5, 1980	Bill Cosby (guest host), Norm Crosby	Charo
4412	May 6, 1980	James Garner, Joe Garagiola	Larry Adler
Desk- "Presidential Tidbits and Trivia"
4413	May 7, 1980	James Coburn	Johnny Cash
Edge of Wetness
4414	May 8, 1980	David Steinberg, Elizabeth Ashley, Peter Strauss	N/A
Mighty Carson Art Players- "Raul Ruiz- Marathon Runner"
4415	May 9, 1980	Robert Blake, Madeline Kahn	Hiroshima
Desk- "Mother's Day Cards"
4416	May 12, 1980	Bert Convy (guest host), Gallagher	N/A
4417	May 13, 1980	Omar Sharif, Sharon Gless, Kareem Abdul-Jabbar	Chuck Mangione
Desk- "Self Help Book Titles"
4418	May 14, 1980	James Stewart, Don Adams	The Manhattan Transfer
Carnac the Magnificent
4419	May 15, 1980	Bill Cosby, Howard Hesseman, Maxie Anderson	Leonard Waxdeck & The Birdcallers
Desk- "Weird Photographs"
4420	May 16, 1980	Sammy Davis Jr., Mariette Hartley, Merie Earle	Sammy Davis Jr. ("Through to the Bitter End", "Omaha Honey", "Ain't Misbehavin'"), Bob & Ray
Floyd R. Turbo- "Against the Census"
4421	May 19, 1980	Richard Benjamin (guest host), Fernando Lamas, Teri Garr, Johnny Yune	Richie Havens
4422	May 20, 1980	Tom Brokaw, Charles Nelson Reilly, Pete Barbutti, Victor Buono	N/A
Desk- "Trivia"
4423	May 21, 1980	Cloris Leachman, Argus Hamilton, Gay Talese	Barbara Mandrell
Desk- "Fortune Cookies"
4424	May 22, 1980	Dinah Shore, Arnaud de Borchgrave	Hoyt Axton
Desk- "Pyramid Clubs"
4425	May 23, 1980	Calvin Trillin	Natalie Cole, Jim Stafford
Mighty Carson Art Players- "Tea-Time Movie"
4426	May 26, 1980	Martin Mull (guest host), Betty White, George Gobel	N/A
4427	May 27, 1980	Bob Hope, Linda Gray, Jack Riley	Gladys Knight & The Pips
Desk- "New Comic Books"
4428	May 28, 1980	Joan Embery, Richard Benjamin, Red Buttons, Dick Enberg	N/A
Desk- "Foreign Commercials"
4429	May 29, 1980	David Brinkley	Beverly Sills, Buddy Rich
Desk- "Little Known Probabilities"
4430	May 30, 1980	Dr. Carl Sagan	Luciano Pavarotti, Sarah Vaughan
Mighty Carson Art Players- "Commercial Blackouts (on sleeping pills, hair coloring, beer, financial services, and coffee)"

=== June ===
No.	Original release date	Guest(s)	Musical/entertainment guest(s)
4431	June 2, 1980	David Letterman (guest host), Florence Henderson	Ben Vereen
4432	June 3, 1980	David Letterman (guest host), Dick Shawn, Robert Mandan, Erich Segal	Neil Sedaka
4433	June 4, 1980	David Steinberg (guest host)	Anthony Newley, Sister Sledge
4434	June 5, 1980	Joan Rivers (guest host), Mike Connors	Mac Davis, Rita Moreno
4435	June 6, 1980	Joan Rivers (guest host), Barbara Walters, Milton Berle, Dick Van Patten	Donna Theodore
4436	June 9, 1980	George Carlin (guest host), Orson Bean, Peter Fonda, Peter Benchley	Patrice Rushen
4437	June 16, 1980	Bob Newhart (guest host), Paul Williams, Sydney Goldsmith	N/A
4438	June 18, 1980	Carl Reiner, Peter Ustinov, Steve Martin	N/A
Desk- "Johnny and Ed Talk"
4439	June 19, 1980	Suzanne Pleshette, David Steinberg, Mare Winningham	Stéphane Grappelli
Desk- "Hospital Snapshots"; Mighty Carson Art Players- "Cainine Vs. Cainine"
4440	June 20, 1980	Buddy Hackett, Martin Mull	N/A
Desk- "Weird Phobias"
4441	June 23, 1980	Burt Reynolds (guest host), Angie Dickinson, Charles Nelson Reilly, Dom DeLuise	Anne Murray
4442	June 25, 1980	Lee Marvin, Buck Henry	Kenny Rogers, Kim Carnes
Edge of Wetness
4443	June 26, 1980	Elizabeth Ashley, Neil Simon, Bob Uecker	Pat Boone
Floyd R. Turbo- "Sexual Harassment"
4444	June 27, 1980	Diahann Carroll, Robert Klein, Teri Garr, Robert Truax	N/A
Desk- "Foods Banned By The NBC Commissary"
4445	June 30, 1980	Rich Little (guest host), Cleveland Amory	Robert Goulet

=== July ===
No.	Original release date	Guest(s)	Musical/entertainment guest(s)
4446	July 7, 1980	Bill Cosby (guest host), Steve Martin, Richard Benjamin, Kreskin	Aretha Franklin
4447	July 21, 1980	Robert Klein (guest host), Kareem Abdul-Jabbar, June Havoc, Pat Paulsen	Anthony Newley, Itzhak Perlman
4448	July 23, 1980	Dyan Cannon, Jim Fowler, Rodney Dangerfield, Arnaud de Borchgrave	N/A
Desk - Johnny gives a firsthand account of the Björn Borg-John McEnroe championship match at the 1980 Wimbledon Championships. He also describes an ill-fated sailing trip to Portofino, Italy.
4449	July 24, 1980	Charlton Heston, Charlie Callas	Rosemary Clooney
Desk- "Souvenirs from Johnny's Vacation"
4450	July 25, 1980	Robert Blake, Steve Landesberg	Carol Neblett
4451	July 28, 1980	Bert Convy (guest host), Orson Bean	Jim Stafford
4452	July 30, 1980	Angie Dickinson, Charles Nelson Reilly	Melissa Manchester
Desk- "Psychic Predictions"
4453	July 31, 1980	Bruce Dern	June Carter Cash performed ("Ring of Fire" and "San Antonio Rose"), Joe Williams
Sketch- "Mr. Coger's Neighborhood"

=== August ===
No.	Original release date	Guest(s)	Musical/entertainment guest(s)
4454	August 1, 1980	Sammy Davis Jr., Shelley Winters, Michelle Pfeiffer	N/A
Stump the Band
4455	August 4, 1980	Bill Cosby (guest host), Charles Grodin	Rita Moreno
4456	August 6, 1980	Tony Randall, Victoria Principal	Barbara Mandrell ("Crackers")
Carnac the Magnificent
4457	August 7, 1980	Dick Cavett, Margot Kidder	Roy Clark
Sketch- "Bucky Lincoln"
4458	August 8, 1980	Ann-Margret, George Miller, David Horowitz	Pete Fountain
Desk- "Little Known Statistics"
4459	August 25, 1980	Joan Rivers (guest host), Mariette Hartley, George Gobel, Dr. Wayne Dyer	Bernadette Peters
4460	August 27, 1980	George Segal, Elizabeth Ashley, Conrad Janis, Sheriff Katherine Crumbley	Johnny Mathis
Desk- "Summer Vacation Pictures"
4461	August 28, 1980	David Steinberg, Sydney Goldsmith, Sy Kramer	Jim Stafford
Desk- "The Trivia Dispatch"; Desk- "This Is Your Life, Tommy Newsom"

=== September ===
No.	Original release date	Guest(s)	Musical/entertainment guest(s)
4462	September 1, 1980	Joan Rivers (guest host), James Coco, Phyllis Diller, Frank Abagnale	Nell Carter ("Honeycomb", "Wild Women Don't Get the Blues" and "Moonglow")
4463	September 3, 1980	Mayor Tom Bradley, Robert Klein	David Grisman Quintet, Dionne Warwick
The New Set
4464	September 4, 1980	Gabriel Kaplan, Fred Rogers	Andy Williams, Buddy Rich
Edge of Wetness
4465	September 5, 1980	Bob Hope, Richard Pryor, Randi Oakes	David Bowie ("Life on Mars", "Ashes to Ashes")
Commercial Blackouts: "Norton Sound", "Custer- Basketball", "Drugs- Carter", "Brezhnev- Sinatra", and "Chrysler".
4466	September 8, 1980	David Steinberg (guest host), Dick Shawn, Mary Kay Place, Helen Gurley Brown	George Shearing, Hoyt Axton
4467	September 10, 1980	Joan Embery, Joe Namath, Dr. Lendon Smith	Stephane Grappelli
Desk- "Platforms Rejected by Major Parties"
4468	September 11, 1980	Charles Nelson Reilly, Argus Hamilton, Michelle Pfeiffer	Judith Blegen
Desk- "Patents That Didn't Make It"
4469	September 12, 1980	Robert Blake, Erma Bombeck, George Wallace, Jeff Greenfield	N/A
Floyd R. Turbo - "Against Imported Cars" (Final 90-minute show)
4470	September 16, 1980	David Brenner	Bette Midler
Desk - "Extension Courses" (First One Hour Show)
4471	September 17, 1980	Michael Landon	Tony Bennett
Carnac the Magnificent
4472	September 18, 1980	Tim Conway, Eve Marie Shahoian	N/A
Desk- "Political Pix's"
4473	September 19, 1980	James Garner, Suzanne Somers	N/A
Commercial Blackouts: "Turgrin", "Louie", "J.R. Jeans", and "Colonel".
4474	September 22, 1980	Robert Klein (guest host), Gary Coleman, Christopher Reeve	N/A
4475	September 23, 1980	Walter Matthau, Martin Mull	N/A
Aunt Blabby
4476	September 24, 1980	Ron Lieske and his pig Ed	Crystal Gayle
Desk- "Carson's Believe It or Stuff It"
4477	September 25, 1980	Charlie Callas	Mac Davis
Desk- "Little Known Facts About Japan"
4478	September 26, 1980	Steve Martin, Dr. Carl Sagan	N/A
Sketch- "Archaeologist"
4479	September 29, 1980	Don Rickles	N/A
18th Anniversary Show
4480	September 30, 1980	David Brenner (guest host), Marty Feldman	Joe Williams, Rita Moreno

=== October ===
No.	Original release date	Guest(s)	Musical/entertainment guest(s)
4481	October 1, 1980	David Brenner (guest host), Erin Gray	Pat Boone
4482	October 2, 1980	David Brenner (guest host), George Burns, Bob Uecker	N/A
Desk- David reads an article about a shortage of human bones and items made out of bones.
4483	October 3, 1980	David Brenner (guest host), Eric Idle, John Cleese	Mel Tillis
4484	October 6, 1980	Bill Cosby (guest host), Wayne Rogers	George Benson
4485	October 7, 1980	Bill Cosby (guest host), Diahann Carroll, Howard Hesseman, Rip Taylor	N/A
4486	October 8, 1980	David Steinberg (guest host), James Woods	Jim Stafford
4487	October 9, 1980	Robert Klein (guest host), Steve Allen	Linda Hopkins
4488	October 10, 1980	Gabriel Kaplan (guest host), Vicki Lawrence, Fred Travalena	N/A
4489	October 14, 1980	Dom DeLuise, Brooke Shields	N/A
Desk- "NBC Shows Ready to Go"
4490	October 15, 1980	Goldie Hawn, Maureen Murphy, Judge Richard Roylston, Judge Robert Roylston	N/A
Mighty Carson Art Players- "G. Walter Schneer- D.M.V."
4491	October 16, 1980	Buddy Hackett, Dr. Morris W. Goldberg	N/A
New Products
4492	October 17, 1980	David Steinberg	Steve Lawrence
Commercial Blackouts: "Toxic Waste", "Los Angeles Smog", "Gambler", and "Operating Room".
4493	October 27, 1980	Martin Mull (guest host), Elizabeth Ashley, Smothers Brothers	The Manhattan Transfer
4494	October 28, 1980	Loni Anderson	Buddy Rich
Desk- "Presidential Trivia"; Desk- "Presidential Poll"
4495	October 29, 1980	Robert Mitchum	Larry Gatlin
Desk- "Political Poll"; Mighty Carson Art Players- "Consumer Supporter"
4496	October 30, 1980	George Carlin, Joe Garagiola	N/A
Desk- "What The Politician Really Means"
4497	October 31, 1980	Bob Hope, Steve Landesberg, Gore Vidal	N/A
Desk- "Political Poll"

=== November ===
No.	Original release date	Guest(s)	Musical/entertainment guest(s)
4498	November 5, 1980	Angie Dickinson	Elton John ("Sorry Seems To Be The Hardest Word")
Edge of Wetness; Sketch- "Jimmy Carter's Concession Speech" (11/4/80 pre-empted for NBC News election night coverage)
4499	November 6, 1980	Tony Randall, Rona Barrett	N/A
Desk- "Lesser Known Politicians"
4500	November 7, 1980	Charlton Heston, Professor John Rassias	N/A
Desk- "Hints from Heloise"
4501	November 11, 1980	David Letterman, Michael Pritchard	Pete Fountain
Carnac the Magnificent
4502	November 12, 1980	Sammy Davis Jr., Jim Fowler	N/A
Desk- "Saturn Photos"
4503	November 13, 1980	Tim Conway, Mare Winningham	N/A
Talk with Ed
4504	November 14, 1980	Jean Marsh, Thom Sharp	Joe Williams
Mighty Carson Art Players- "The Big Gamble"
4505	November 18, 1980	Calvin Trillin	Dolly Parton
Desk- "Blue Cards"
4506	November 19, 1980	Ricky Schroder, Sean Morey, Jeana Tomasino	N/A
Desk- "Whatchamacallit Words"
4507	November 20, 1980	James Coco, Joe Newton	Chet Atkins
Mighty Carson Art Players- "Interview with Carl Sagan"
4508	November 21, 1980	Carl Reiner, Raquel Welch	N/A
Desk- "Horror Movies"
4509	November 24, 1980	Joan Rivers (guest host), Minnie Pearl	Linda Lavin
4510	November 25, 1980	Harry Garrison, Maureen Murphy	Eydie Gormé
Desk- "Vacation Destinations"
4511	November 26, 1980	Don Rickles, George Heap	N/A
Desk- "1981 Calendars"
4512	November 27, 1980	McLean Stevenson, Charles Grodin	N/A
Floyd R. Turbo- "In Favor of Junk Food for Schools"
4513	November 28, 1980	Shelley Duvall, Bobby Kelton	Jim Stafford
Desk- "Ultimate Gifts"

=== December ===
No.	Original release date	Guest(s)	Musical/entertainment guest(s)
4514	December 1, 1980	David Letterman (guest host), Pete Barbutti, Marilu Henner	N/A
4515	December 2, 1980	David Letterman (guest host), Jack Lemmon	Hoyt Axton
Desk- "People Who Will Not Be On The Tonight Show"
4516	December 3, 1980	David Letterman (guest host), Rich Hall	Crystal Gayle
Desk- "Lesser Known Art Works by Famous Artists"
4517	December 4, 1980	David Letterman (guest host), Teri Garr, Victor Buono	N/A
4518	December 5, 1980	David Letterman (guest host), Steve Allen	N/A
4519	December 9, 1980	Bill Cosby, Susan George	N/A
Desk- "Christmas Television Specials"
4520	December 10, 1980	Jane Fonda, Pete Barbutti	N/A
Edge of Wetness; Desk- Johnny reads a letter sent in by a teacher from Niagara Falls, New York with examples of student test answers.
4521	December 11, 1980	James Stewart, Hodding Carter III	N/A
Desk- "Letters to Santa Claus"
4522	December 12, 1980	Richard Pryor, Richard Benjamin	N/A
Stump the Band
4523	December 15, 1980	Joan Rivers (guest host), Bob Hope, Charlton Heston	N/A
4524	December 16, 1980	Buddy Hackett	Johnny Mathis
Sketch- "Dickie the Stick"
4525	December 17, 1980	Johnny Yune	B.B. King
New Products
4526	December 18, 1980	Suzanne Somers, Robert Klein	N/A
Desk- "Christmas Cards"
4527	December 19, 1980	Bob Newhart, Frank Sinatra	St. Matthews School Choir ("Here We Come A-Caroling", "I Saw Three Ships", "How Far Is It To Bethlehem?" and "God Rest Ye Merry, Gentlemen"), Mac Davis ("Hooked On Music")
Desk- "Frank Sinatra Walk-On"
4528	December 30, 1980	Angie Dickinson, Professor Andrew Levine	Eddie Harris
Desk- "How to Beat Those Holiday Blues"
4529	December 31, 1980	Maureen Murphy	Sahara Girls, The Manhattan Transfer
News Years' Eve in Burbank
