= List of The Tonight Show Starring Johnny Carson episodes (1981) =

Episodes in 1981

- No. of episodes: 178

Release
- Original network: NBC

Season chronology
- ← Previous; 1980 episodes Next → 1982 episodes

The following is a list of episodes of the television series The Tonight Show Starring Johnny Carson which aired in 1981. In October, 1962 Johnny Carson took over as host of the show from the previous host Jack Paar.

== 1981 ==
=== January ===
No.	Original release date	Guest(s)	Musical/entertainment guest(s)
4530	January 1, 1981	Marie Osmond, Charles Nelson Reilly	N/A
Desk- "New Year's Resolutions"
4531	January 2, 1981	David Letterman, Susan Sarandon	Linda Hopkins
Desk- "Eulogy for Baby"
4532	January 6, 1981	Peter O'Toole, Victoria Principal	The Pointer Sisters
Desk- "25 Least Intriguing People of 1980"
4533	January 7, 1981	Sugar Ray Leonard, Erma Bombeck	Joe Williams
Desk- "Blue Cards"
4534	January 8, 1981	McLean Stevenson, James Woods, Bum Phillips	N/A
Sketch- "G. Walter Schneer- Insurance"
4535	January 9, 1981	Burt Reynolds, Argus Hamilton	Doobie Brothers
Desk- "Psychic Predictions"
4536	January 13, 1981	Shelley Winters, Martin Mull, Juanita Booker	N/A
4537	January 14, 1981	Peter Strauss, George Gobel	Oak Ridge Boys
Carnac the Magnificent
4538	January 15, 1981	David Steinberg, William Conrad	N/A
Edge of Wetness
4539	January 16, 1981	Bob Hope, Argus Hamilton	N/A
Desk- "La Brea Tar Pits Remnants"
4540	January 26, 1981	George Carlin (guest host), Debbie Reynolds, Kip Addotta, Dr. Joyce Brothers	N/A
4541	January 27, 1981	David Letterman (guest host), Franklyn Ajaye	Ricky Nelson
4542	January 28, 1981	David Letterman (guest host), Pete Barbutti	Aretha Franklin
4543	January 29, 1981	David Letterman (guest host), Kelly Monteith, Marilu Henner	N/A
Desk- "Program Reminder"
4544	January 30, 1981	David Letterman (guest host), Lily Tomlin	N/A
Desk- "Olympic Sports"

=== February ===
No.	Original release date	Guest(s)	Musical/entertainment guest(s)
4545	February 2, 1981	Joan Rivers (guest host), Larry Hagman, Ricky Schroder	Bobby Vinton
4546	February 3, 1981	Rodney Dangerfield	Irene Cara
Desk- "Inaugural Trivia"
4547	February 4, 1981	Charlie Callas	N/A
Talk with Ed
4548	February 5, 1981	Jon Walter	Tony Bennett
Stump the Band
4549	February 6, 1981	Michael Landon, Tanya Roberts	Jean-Pierre Rampal
Desk- "T.V. Guide"
4550	February 10, 1981	Bill Cosby, Jack Klugman	N/A
4551	February 11, 1981	Charles Grodin	Loretta Lynn
Floyd R. Turbo- "Editorial Reply Against Funding For The Arts"
4552	February 12, 1981	George Segal, Lorna Patterson	N/A
4553	February 13, 1981	Doug Henning	Bob & Ray
Desk- "Superstitions"
4554	February 17, 1981	Robert Blake, Calvin Trillin	Linda Hopkins
Desk- "Blue Cards"
4555	February 18, 1981	Lee Trevino	Pete Fountain
Desk- "First Photographs"
4556	February 19, 1981	Rich Hall, Dr. Lawrence Kuznetz	Jim Stafford
Desk- "Guide to Los Angeles"
4557	February 20, 1981	Tony Randall	Sarah Vaughan
4558	February 23, 1981	Rich Little (guest host), Charlton Heston, Paul Williams, Peter Cook	N/A
4559	February 24, 1981	Carl Reiner, Catherine Deneuve	N/A
Carnac the Magnificent
4560	February 25, 1981	Barbara Eden, Bobby Kelton, Arnold Roth	N/A
Desk- "Crimebusters Bulletin"
4561	February 26, 1981	Mickey Rooney, Priscilla Barnes	N/A
Stump the Band
4562	February 27, 1981	David Letterman, Sydne Rome	N/A
Commercial Blackouts: "Alpo", "Static Gone", "Citi Corp Travelers Checks", "Kelvins" and "Harry's Bristol Cream"

=== March ===
No.	Original release date	Guest(s)	Musical/entertainment guest(s)
4563	March 2, 1981	Martin Mull (guest host), Morgan Fairchild, Bob Uecker	Mac Davis
4564	March 3, 1981	Joan Rivers	Barbara Mandrell
Desk- "Library Questions"
4565	March 4, 1981	David Brenner, Christie Brinkley	N/A
Mighty Carson Art Players- "Cronkite Sketch"; Brooke Shields is in the audience.
4566	March 5, 1981	Charles Nelson Reilly	Slim Whitman
Mighty Carson Art Players- "Carl Sagan Sketch"
4567	March 6, 1981	Steve Landesberg	Melissa Manchester
Edge of Wetness
4568	March 17, 1981	Sally Field	Mel Tillis
Desk- "National Enquirer"
4569	March 18, 1981	Richard Benjamin, Garry Shandling, Jan Stephenson	N/A
Desk- "Silliness with Ed: The Snit Never Stops Flying and Sharks Never Stop Swimming"
4570	March 19, 1981	David Steinberg, Lois Areno	Peabo Bryson
Desk- "Movies That Didn't Get Nominated for an Oscar"
4571	March 20, 1981	Suzanne Somers, Dr. Warren Thomas	N/A
Mighty Carson Art Players- "Marharishi Psychic"
4572	March 24, 1981	none	B.B. King, Phyllis Newman
Desk- "Blue Cards"
4573	March 25, 1981	Peter Strauss, Gore Vidal	N/A
Desk- "Chapter Two of Dot Riddle"
4574	March 26, 1981	Patrick Macnee, Pete Barbutti	N/A
Desk- "Homework School of The Air"
4575	March 27, 1981	Charles Nelson Reilly, Richard Lewis, Cathy Moriarty	N/A
Mighty Carson Art Players- "Commercial Actor School"

=== April ===
No.	Original release date	Guest(s)	Musical/entertainment guest(s)
4576	April 6, 1981	Joan Rivers (guest host), David Brenner, James Coco, Rip Taylor	N/A
4577	April 7, 1981	Suzanne Pleshette, Dick Cavett	N/A
Desk- "Talk with Ed"
4578	April 8, 1981	Angie Dickinson	Joe Williams
Desk- "Library Questions"
4579	April 9, 1981	Albert Brooks, Susan Sarandon	N/A
Carnac the Magnificent, Desk- Johnny, citing information from the International Oceanographic Foundation, states there are sharks who don't need to swim at all times.
4580	April 10, 1981	Robert Blake, Calvin Trillin	N/A
Desk- Johnny talks with Ed about staying up for the aborted inaugural launch of the Space Shuttle Columbia. It took off 2 days later. The Mighty Carson Art Players present G. Walter Schneer defending the IRS.

=== May ===
No.	Original release date	Guest(s)	Musical/entertainment guest(s)
4581	May 5, 1981	Thalassa Cruso	Jimmy Buffett ("Margaritaville" and "Stars Fell on Alabama")
Desk- "What Writers Really Want Out Of The Strike"; Desk- "Foreign Commercials"
4582	May 6, 1981	Ringo Starr, Jerry Seinfeld, Barbara Bach	Oak Ridge Boys
4583	May 7, 1981	Richard Harris, Mariette Hartley	N/A
Edge of Wetness
4584	May 8, 1981	David Letterman, Charles Haid	N/A
Desk- "Foreign Commercials"; Desk- "Letters from Children: Rules for Marriage Partners"
4585	May 12, 1981	Lorna Patterson	Jim Stafford
Desk- "Durations Book: How Long Certain Things Take to Do"
4586	May 13, 1981	Martin Mull, Joe Garagiola	N/A
Desk- "What Famous People Will Look Like 25 Years From Now"
4587	May 14, 1981	Joan Rivers, William & Amos Caulfield	N/A
Floyd R. Turbo- "Editorial Reply on High-Salaried Baseball Players"
4588	May 19, 1981	Alan Alda, David Brenner	N/A
Desk- "People Magazine Poll"
4589	May 20, 1981	George Carlin, Richard Pryor	N/A
Desk- "Whatchamacallit Words"
4590	May 21, 1981	George Segal, Rich Hall	N/A
Carnac the Magnificent
4591	May 22, 1981	Carol Wayne	Leonard Waxdeck & The Birdcallers, Larry Gatlin
Mighty Carson Art Players- "Tea-Time Movie"
4592	May 26, 1981	Dr. Paul Ehrlich	Liza Minnelli ("New York, New York")
Desk- "Bride's Book of Etiquette"
4593	May 27, 1981	Shelley Winters, Robert Klein	N/A
Stump the Band
4594	May 28, 1981	Maureen Murphy	Steve Lawrence
Desk- "Tree Falling from a Forest Question"
4595	May 29, 1981	Kathryn Harrold	Eydie Gormé
Desk- "Famous High School Graduates"

=== June ===
No.	Original release date	Guest(s)	Musical/entertainment guest(s)
4596	June 1, 1981	Rich Little (guest host)	Charo
4597	June 2, 1981	David Brenner (guest host)	Connie Stevens, Linda Hopkins
4598	June 3, 1981	David Letterman (guest host), Charles Grodin	Tina Turner performed ("Crazy in the Night" and "Take a Little Pain")
Desk- "International Signs"
4599	June 4, 1981	David Letterman (guest host), Bert Convy, Teri Garr	N/A
4600	June 5, 1981	David Letterman (guest host), Joan Embery, Dr. Lendon Smith	Hoyt Axton
4601	June 9, 1981	Buddy Hackett, Dr. Richard Archer	N/A
Desk- "Free Things to Do This Summer in South California"
4602	June 10, 1981	Madeline Kahn, Pete Barbutti	N/A
Desk- "Blue Cards"
4603	June 11, 1981	Peter Cook, Garry Shandling	Chet Atkins
Desk- "Homework School of The Air"
4604	June 12, 1981	Steve Landesberg, Shelley Long	Pete Fountain
Commercial Blackouts: "Like Cereal", "Gullo Wine", "Flab Cola", and "Shanka Coffee".
4605	June 16, 1981	Arnold Schwarzenegger	Dionne Warwick
Desk- "Library Questions"
4606	June 17, 1981	Gerald Lawton, Myrtle Whitcher, Terry Rich	Tom Jones
Edge of Wetness
4607	June 18, 1981	Jim Fowler, David Steinberg	N/A
Carnac the Magnificent
4608	June 19, 1981	Lou Holtz, Dr. Carl Sagan	Ross Tompkins
Mighty Carson Art Players- "David Horitzer- Consumer Supporter"
4609	June 23, 1981	Robert Blake	Kenny Rankin
Desk- "Doublespeak"
4610	June 24, 1981	Franklyn Ajaye, David Horowitz	Nicolette Larson
Desk- "Possible Vacation Trips People Might Take"
4611	June 25, 1981	McLean Stevenson, Bob Uecker	N/A
Floyd R. Turbo- "Editorial Reply on Air Traffic Controllers"
4612	June 26, 1981	Suzanne Somers, William Holden	N/A
Stump the Band
4613	June 29, 1981	Joan Rivers (guest host), Gary Coleman, Dick Van Patten	N/A
4614	June 30, 1981	Joan Rivers (guest host), George Hamilton, George Gobel	Mac Davis

=== July ===
No.	Original release date	Guest(s)	Musical/entertainment guest(s)
4615	July 1, 1981	David Letterman (guest host), Bess Armstrong, Joe Garagiola	N/A
Desk- "Program Reminder"
4616	July 2, 1981	David Letterman (guest host), Richard Lewis	Jim Stafford
4617	July 3, 1981	David Letterman (guest host), Margot Kidder, Richard Simmons	Natalie Cole
4618	July 21, 1981	Suzanne Pleshette, Dr. Robert Altman with the opera singing bird named Nino	N/A
Talk with Ed
4619	July 22, 1981	Jerry Seinfeld, Rona Barrett	The Angels Ensemble of California
Desk- "Behavior Book: Manual for Ladies"
4620	July 23, 1981	George Segal, Mariette Hartley	The Beverly Hills Unlisted Jazz Band ("Ain't Nobody's Business" and "Bill Bailey, Won't You Please Come Home?")
Desk- "What Americans Are Doing During the Baseball Strike"
4621	July 24, 1981	Michael Landon, Bo Derek	Doc Severinsen & The NBC Orchestra
Mighty Carson Art Players- "Mediterranean Fruit Fly"
4622	July 28, 1981	James Stewart	Mac Davis
Desk- "Dental Charts of Prince Charles and Lady Diana"; Desk- "Memorabilia from England"
4623	July 29, 1981	Robert Klein	Johnny Mathis
Desk- "Facts About The Royal Wedding by Sir Eton Crumpet"
4624	July 30, 1981	Sylvester Stallone	B.B. King
Desk- "Blue Cards"
4625	July 31, 1981	Angie Dickinson, Tommy Lasorda, Dom DeLuise	N/A
G. Walter Schneer, Hospital Skopesman

=== August ===
No.	Original release date	Guest(s)	Musical/entertainment guest(s)
4626	August 4, 1981	Charles Nelson Reilly	Loretta Lynn
Stump the Band
4627	August 5, 1981	Alan King	Sheena Easton
Carnac the Magnificent, famous for the Sis Boom Bah joke.
4628	August 6, 1981	John Travolta, Erma Bombeck	N/A
Desk- "Famous Persons' Last Words"; Johnny asks Fred de Cordova about his involvement shooting the film The King of Comedy with Robert De Niro & Jerry Lewis.
4629	August 7, 1981	Dudley Moore, Franklyn Ajaye, Laurene Landon	N/A
Aunt Blabby
4630	August 11, 1981	Betty Thomas, Marge Carlson	Andy Williams ("New York, New York" and "The More I See You")
Desk- "Odds and Ends"
4631	August 12, 1981	William Devane, Pat McCormick	The Manhattan Transfer
Desk- "Library Questions"
4632	August 13, 1981	Richard Benjamin, Paula Prentiss, Henny Youngman	N/A
Edge of Wetness
4633	August 14, 1981	Peter Strauss, Betty White, Victor Buono	N/A
Sketch- "Tarzan And The Apes"
4634	August 17, 1981	David Steinberg (guest host), Charles Grodin	Bernadette Peters
4635	August 18, 1981	David Steinberg (guest host), Joan Embery, Margot Kidder	N/A
4636	August 19, 1981	David Letterman (guest host), Steve Allen, Sydney Goldsmith, Michael Keaton	N/A
Desk- "Program Reminder"
4637	August 20, 1981	David Letterman (guest host), Elke Sommer	Al Jarreau
4638	August 21, 1981	David Letterman (guest host), John Ritter, Andrea Martin	N/A
Desk- "Public Service Announcement"
4639	August 24, 1981	Bill Cosby (guest host), Sugar Ray Leonard, Robert Culp	N/A
4640	August 25, 1981	Bill Cosby (guest host), Norm Crosby, Richard Simmons	N/A
4641	August 26, 1981	Bill Cosby (guest host), James Coco, Shelley Long	George Shearing
4642	August 27, 1981	Bill Cosby (guest host), Dr. Lendon Smith	Tina Turner
4643	August 28, 1981	Bill Cosby (guest host), Lynn Redgrave, James Hampton	Aretha Franklin

=== September ===
No.	Original release date	Guest(s)	Musical/entertainment guest(s)
4644	September 1, 1981	David Brenner	Tony Bennett
Talk with Ed
4645	September 2, 1981	Joan Rivers, George Segal	Conrad Janis and the Beverly Hills Unlisted Jazz Band
Desk- "Boy Scout Hand Book"
4646	September 3, 1981	Dom DeLuise	Steve Lawrence
Desk- "Whatchamacallit Words"
4647	September 4, 1981	David Letterman, David Naughton	Linda Hopkins
Stump the Band
4648	September 8, 1981	Neil Simon, Sean Morey, Marsha Mason	The Oak Ridge Boys
Desk- Johnny explains that he is feeling a bit 'dippy' because he has been to a dentist this morning for deep cleaning. Tommy Newson was the next patient to see the dentist so Johnny dressed up as the dentist and checked over Tommy's charts and moaned.
4649	September 9, 1981	Smothers Brothers, Brooke Shields	N/A
4650	September 10, 1981	Tony Randall, Maureen Murphy	N/A
Desk- "Disaster Guide"
4651	September 11, 1981	David Steinberg, Morgan Fairchild	Joe Williams
Commercial Blackouts: Spoofs on 'James Bond', 'Gone With The Wind', 'Casablanca' and 'The Elephant Man'.
4652	September 15, 1981	Steve Landesberg	Larry Gatlin
Carnac the Magnificent
4653	September 16, 1981	Margot Kidder, David Frank with his singing parrot Poncho	Al Jarreau
Desk- "Blue Cards"
4654	September 17, 1981	Bert Convy, Rich Hall	N/A
Desk- "Unusual College Courses"
4655	September 18, 1981	Robert Blake, Franklyn Ajaye	The Dixie Belles
4656	September 22, 1981	Burt Reynolds, Charles Nelson Reilly	N/A
Edge of Wetness
4657	September 23, 1981	Mariette Hartley	The 5th Dimension
Desk- "Shortcuts"
4658	September 24, 1981	Robert Klein	Ann Jillian
Sketch- "The Entomologist"
4659	September 25, 1981	Kelly Monteith	Eydie Gormé
Desk- "Library Questions"
4660	September 28, 1981	Joan Rivers (guest host), Richard Simmons	Tony Orlando
4661	September 29, 1981	Joan Rivers (guest host), James Coco, Erma Bombeck, Elizabeth Ashley	N/A
4662	September 30, 1981	Joan Rivers (guest host), Cher, Charles Grodin, Helen Gurley Brown	N/A

=== October ===
No.	Original release date	Guest(s)	Musical/entertainment guest(s)
4663	October 1, 1981	David Steinberg (guest host), Phyllis Diller, Beverly D'Angelo, Peter Cook	N/A
4664	October 2, 1981	David Letterman (guest host), Steve Allen	N/A
Desk- "Test Market Food"
4665	October 7, 1981	Maureen Stapleton, Elliott Gould	Sarah Vaughan
Desk- "What's In a Name"
4666	October 8, 1981	Peter Billingsley, Martin Mull, James Woods	N/A
Desk- "Corporate Mergers"
4667	October 9, 1981	Candice Bergen, Doug Henning	N/A
Desk- "Blue Cards"
4668	October 13, 1981	David Brenner, Elizabeth Tashjian	B.B. King
Desk- "Burbank Visitors Guide"
4669	October 14, 1981	Robin Williams, Jean Marsh	N/A
Blackouts: Takeoff of 'Patton' and Takeoff of a 'Chess Match'.
4670	October 15, 1981	Sammy Davis, Jr., Alan Alda, Alan King	N/A
Carnac the Magnificent
4671	October 16, 1981	Bruce Dern, Andrea Martin	N/A
Mighty Carson Art Players- "Carl Sagan Sketch"
4672	October 27, 1981	Tony Randall	Jim Stafford
Desk- "Quiz on Famous Quotes"
4673	October 28, 1981	Dick Cavett, Lance Burton	Reba McEntire ("You Lift Me Up to Heaven")
4674	October 29, 1981	Angie Dickinson, Garry Shandling	Pilobolus
Edge of Wetness
4675	October 30, 1981	Michael Landon	Sheena Easton
Desk- "Odds and Ends"; Commercial Blackouts: 'Polaroid Camera', 'Roach Hotel', 'Michelob Beer', and 'Yodell Hills'.

=== November ===
No.	Original release date	Guest(s)	Musical/entertainment guest(s)
4676	November 3, 1981	Shelley Winters, Pete Barbutti	L.A. Dodgers Blue Wrecking Crew
4677	November 4, 1981	Gabriel Kaplan, Teri Garr	Ronnie Milsap
Desk- "Euphemisms"
4678	November 5, 1981	Smothers Brothers, Frank Nelson, Joan Dornemann	N/A
Sketch- "Mailman Sketch with Frank Nelson"
4679	November 6, 1981	Robert Klein, Calvin Trillin	N/A
Sketch- "Russian Submarine Commander Interview"
4680	November 10, 1981	David Niven	Barbara Mandrell
Desk- "Tonight Show Guest During Sweeps Week"
4681	November 11, 1981	TBA	Buddy Rich, Dionne Warwick
Desk- "Blue Cards"
4682	November 12, 1981	Dom DeLuise, Jerry Seinfeld, Betty White	N/A
Sketch- "Video Untouchables"
4683	November 13, 1981	George Burns, Lorna Patterson	N/A
Desk- "Phobias"
4684	November 17, 1981	Joan Rivers, David Horowitz	Linda Hopkins
Desk- "Golden Fleece Award"
4685	November 18, 1981	Cassie Yates, Elizabeth Tashjian	Mel Tillis
Carnac the Magnificent
4686	November 19, 1981	Suzanne Pleshette	Luciano Pavarotti
Desk- "Library Questions"
4687	November 20, 1981	Ricky Schroder, Bob Hope, Susan Sarandon	N/A
Desk- Johnny and Ed Discuss the Riddle from Last Night.
4688	November 24, 1981	David Brenner, Wally Lattimer	Aretha Franklin
Stump the Band
4689	November 25, 1981	Louis and Bernice Eisenberg	Kenny Rogers
Desk- "Thanksgiving Letters from Kids"
4690	November 26, 1981	Buddy Hackett, Bud Greenspan	The Angels Ensemble of California
Desk- "Blue Cards"
4691	November 27, 1981	James Garner, Regis Philbin	N/A
Aunt Blabby
4692	November 30, 1981	David Letterman (guest host), Mariette Hartley	Anne Murray

=== December ===
No.	Original release date	Guest(s)	Musical/entertainment guest(s)
4693	December 1, 1981	David Letterman (guest host), Rona Barrett, Dave Thomas	N/A
4694	December 2, 1981	David Letterman (guest host), Dick Enberg, Jane Pauley	Natalie Cole
This was Letterman's final turn as the guest host of The Tonight Show.
4695	December 3, 1981	George Carlin (guest host), Victor Buono	Della Reese
4696	December 4, 1981	George Carlin (guest host), Sandy Duncan	Helen Reddy
4697	December 8, 1981	Buddy Hackett, Rocky Graziano	N/A
Desk- "Euphemisms"
4698	December 9, 1981	Elizabeth Ashley, Charlie Callas	N/A
Desk- Johnny talks about drunk driving, warning not to drive intoxicated, then reads an article sent in from a viewer regarding the penalties in foreign countries for drunk driving (ex. Execution for First Offenses).; Desk- "Foreign Commercials"
4699	December 10, 1981	Jack Lemmon, Walter Matthau	N/A
Desk- "Who's In Charge Here?"
4700	December 11, 1981	Chevy Chase	Diana Ross
Desk- "Christmas Television Specials"
4701	December 15, 1981	Jim Fowler, Gore Vidal	N/A
Desk- "Letters to Santa"
4702	December 16, 1981	Stewart Granger	N/A
New Products
4703	December 17, 1981	Robert Blake, Donna Dixon	B.B. King
Mighty Carson Art Players- "Bruce Lee's Fists of Christmas"
4704	December 18, 1981	Bob Hope, Jane Fonda, Frank Nelson	Sarah Vaughan
Sketch- "Frank Nelson as Santa"
4705	December 29, 1981	James Stewart, Steve Martin	N/A
Desk- "Things to Do on New Year's Eve"
4706	December 30, 1981	Martin Mull, Bryant Gumbel	The Manhattan Transfer
Desk- "Less Intriguing People"
4707	December 31, 1981	Lance Burton, Maureen Murphy	The Manhattan Transfer
Sketch- "Father Time"
