= List of The Tonight Show Starring Johnny Carson episodes (1982) =

Episodes in 1982

- No. of episodes: 204

Release
- Original network: NBC

Season chronology
- ← Previous; 1981 episodes Next → 1983 episodes

The following is a list of episodes of the television series The Tonight Show Starring Johnny Carson which aired in 1982. In October, 1962 Johnny Carson took over as host of the show from the previous host Jack Paar.

== 1982 ==
- This is the last season where Ed McMahon didn't wear any glasses.

=== January ===
No.	Original release date	Guest(s)	Musical/entertainment guest(s)
4708	January 1, 1982	McLean Stevenson, Eddie Murphy	N/A
Desk- "Predictions"
4709	January 5, 1982	David Steinberg, Rich Hall	Nell Carter ("Never Been So Glad")
Desk- "Blue Cards"
4710	January 6, 1982	Alan King, Charles Nelson Reilly	N/A
Carnac the Magnificent
4711	January 7, 1982	George Carlin, Colleen Camp	Ray Price
Desk- "Referee Signals"
4712	January 8, 1982	Mimi Kennedy, Pete Barbutti	Oak Ridge Boys
Commercial Blackouts: 'Aldo Cello Wine', 'Remington Razors', 'Mueller Beer' and 'John Mouseman'.
4713	January 12, 1982	Sally Field, Cathy Moriarty	Lionel Hampton
Desk- "Library Questions"
4714	January 13, 1982	Charles Grodin	Itzhak Perlman
Desk- "Little Known Ailments"
4715	January 14, 1982	Bert Convy, Tillie Abrahamson	N/A
Edge of Wetness
4716	January 15, 1982	David Letterman	Melissa Manchester
Desk- "Greats Moments in History"
4717	January 25, 1982	Joan Rivers (guest host), Angie Dickinson, Rich Little	N/A
4718	January 26, 1982	Joan Rivers (guest host), Jean Marsh, Rip Taylor	N/A
4719	January 27, 1982	Joan Rivers (guest host), John Ritter	Charo
4720	January 28, 1982	David Brenner (guest host), Joan Embery, Susan Saint James, Gallagher	N/A
4721	January 29, 1982	David Brenner (guest host), Sugar Ray Leonard, Kate Jackson	N/A

=== February ===
No.	Original release date	Guest(s)	Musical/entertainment guest(s)
4722	February 2, 1982	Dom DeLuise, Brooke Shields	N/A
Desk- "List of New Responsibility of The States"
4723	February 3, 1982	Gregory Hines, Peter Cook	N/A
Desk- "English Slang Expressions"
4724	February 4, 1982	Lynn Redgrave, Franklyn Ajaye, Tom Hanks	N/A
Desk- "Blue Cards"
4725	February 5, 1982	Dick Cavett, John Byner, Thalassa Cruso	N/A
4726	February 9, 1982	Peter Ustinov	Nell Carter ("Leave Me My Heart")
Desk- "Library Questions"
4727	February 10, 1982	Wayne Rogers, Eddie Murphy, Albert Hague	N/A
Stump the Band
4728	February 11, 1982	Burt Reynolds, Richard Lewis	N/A
Mighty Carson Art Players- "This Is Your Life... Burt Reynolds" featuring a surprise appearance by Dom DeLuise
4729	February 12, 1982	Michael Landon, Gore Vidal	N/A
4730	February 16, 1982	Tony Randall, Smothers Brothers	N/A
Sketch- "Wright Brothers- Save the Sketch"
4731	February 17, 1982	Gallagher	Steve Lawrence
Desk- "Bush Tapes"; Desk- "George Washington Trivia"
4732	February 18, 1982	Rodney Dangerfield, Mimi Kennedy	B.B. King
Desk- "Movies That Didn't Get Oscar Nominations"
4733	February 19, 1982	Suzanne Somers, Calvin Trillin	N/A
Desk- "Aerobicise"; Hamlet Sketch
4734	February 23, 1982	Swoosie Kurtz, David Brenner	Jimmy Buffett
Desk- "Blue Cards"
4735	February 24, 1982	Diahann Carroll, Steve Landesberg	N/A
Edge of Wetness
4736	February 25, 1982	Rich Little, Irena Ferris	Gregg Burge
Sketch- "Andy Rooney"
4737	February 26, 1982	Bob Hope	Pete Fountain
Desk- "Sweeps Week"

=== March ===
No.	Original release date	Guest(s)	Musical/entertainment guest(s)
4738	March 2, 1982	Paul Sorvino, Garry Shandling	Joe Williams ("8 to 5 I Lose" and "I Had Someone Else Before I Had You")
Desk- "Odds and Ends"
4739	March 3, 1982	Harvey Korman, Jane Pauley, Ronn Lucas	N/A
Carnac the Magnificent
4740	March 4, 1982	Michael Caine, Dana Hill	N/A
Stump the Band
4741	March 5, 1982	Dyan Cannon, Walter Cronkite	N/A
Mighty Carson Art Players- "Fernando Valenzuela Interview"
4742	March 8, 1982	Bill Cosby (guest host), Dick Van Patten, Teri Garr	N/A
4743	March 9, 1982	Bill Cosby (guest host), Morgan Fairchild, Pete Barbutti	N/A
4744	March 10, 1982	Bill Cosby (guest host), Dr. Joyce Brothers	N/A
4745	March 11, 1982	George Carlin (guest host), Paul Williams, Regis Philbin	Jose Molina
4746	March 12, 1982	George Carlin (guest host), Richard Belzer, Jean Marsh, James Garner	N/A
4747	March 16, 1982	Richard Pryor, Jack Arak and wife Lillian	Woody Herman
Desk- "Blue Cards"
4748	March 17, 1982	Carl Reiner, Bob Uecker	N/A
Desk- "St. Patrick's Day Legends"
4749	March 18, 1982	Jack Lemmon, Maureen Murphy, Janet Hillis	N/A
Mighty Carson Art Players- "G. Walter Schneer- I.R.S." & Desk - Johnny shares how Albuquerque 3rd & 4th graders complete proverbs.
4750	March 19, 1982	David Steinberg, James M. Whitney	Linda Hopkins
Desk- "Fabulous Fallacies"
4751	March 23, 1982	Ricky Schroder, Walter Matthau	N/A
Desk- "Celebrating Spring"
4752	March 24, 1982	Shelley Winters, Bill Cosby	N/A
Edge of Wetness
4753	March 25, 1982	Christopher Reeve, Albert Hague	N/A
Sketch- "Mr. Ronnie's Neighborhood"
4754	March 26, 1982	Cheryl Ladd	Scatman Crothers
Desk- "Carson's Believe It or Stuff It"
4755	March 30, 1982	Roger Moore, Maureen Stapleton	N/A
Desk- "Library Questions"
4756	March 31, 1982	Joan Rivers, Kim Lankford	Joey Lawrence
Desk- "Real Estate Ads and What the Terms Mean"

=== April ===
No.	Original release date	Guest(s)	Musical/entertainment guest(s)
4757	April 1, 1982	Kelly Monteith	Placido Domingo
Desk- "April Fool's Pranks"
4758	April 2, 1982	Robert Blake, Walter Casey Jones	N/A
Sketch- "Tea-Time Movie"
4759	April 6, 1982	Charles Grodin, Jerry Seinfeld, Victoria Principal	N/A
Desk- "Blue Cards"
4760	April 7, 1982	Robert Klein, Joe Garagiola	N/A
Stump the Band
4761	April 8, 1982	Jim Fowler, Tom Hanks	Gregg Burge
Carnac the Magnificent
4762	April 9, 1982	Lynn Redgrave, Paul Reiser, David Horowitz	N/A
Sketch- "Argentinian General"
4763	April 19, 1982	Bill Cosby (guest host), Mariette Hartley	Tony Orlando
4764	April 20, 1982	Bill Cosby (guest host), Marie Osmond, Steve Allen	N/A
4765	April 21, 1982	Bill Cosby (guest host)	Wynton Marsalis
4766	April 22, 1982	Joan Rivers (guest host), Robert Mitchum, Gallagher	N/A
4767	April 23, 1982	Joan Rivers (guest host), Betty White, David Brenner	Bernadette Peters
4768	April 27, 1982	Paul Sorvino	Andy Williams
Desk- "Nuclear Preparedness"
4769	April 28, 1982	Mimi Kennedy, Teri Ann Linn	Loretta Lynn
Desk- "As The White House Turns"
4770	April 29, 1982	Bruce Weitz	Sheena Easton ("For Your Eyes Only" and "You Could Have Been With Me")
Desk- "Garbology"
4771	April 30, 1982	Bob Hope, Sammy Davis, Jr.	N/A
Desk- Johnny reads an article from the Hoosier News of a red dye banned in rat poison because it cause cancer in rats.; Sketch- "International Jokes Limitation Talks"

=== May ===
No.	Original release date	Guest(s)	Musical/entertainment guest(s)
4772	May 4, 1982	John and Donna Thompson	John Denver
Desk- "Blue Cards"
4773	May 5, 1982	Arnold Schwarzenegger, Franklyn Ajaye	Buddy DeFranco, Terry Gibbs
Desk- "Vacation Ideas"
4774	May 6, 1982	Tony Randall, Bill Kirchenbauer, Dr. Theodore Goldstein	N/A
Desk- "Letters from Kids"
4775	May 7, 1982	Smothers Brothers, Frank Hill	N/A
Mighty Carson Art Players- "Who's on First with Ronald Reagan"
4776	May 11, 1982	Steve Landesberg	Gerard Kenny
Desk- "Library Questions"
4777	May 12, 1982	Alex Karras, Wil Shriner, Ron Luciano	N/A
Desk- "T.V. Character Names"
4778	May 13, 1982	Dick Cavett	Oak Ridge Boys
Desk- "How to Pick Up a Man"
4779	May 14, 1982	McLean Stevenson, Bobby Kelton, Christie Brinkley	N/A
Sketch- "The Evening News with Zontar Rather on May 14, 2002"
4780	May 18, 1982	Tim Conway	Willie Nelson
Desk- "Television Magazine Ads"
4781	May 19, 1982	Alan King, Richard Harris	N/A
Carnac the Magnificent
4782	May 20, 1982	Carl Reiner, Bill Cosby	N/A
Desk- "Odds and Ends"
4783	May 21, 1982	Sylvester Stallone, Steve Martin	N/A
Desk- "Pilots That Didn't Make It"
4784	May 25, 1982	Suzanne Pleshette, Argus Hamilton, Frank Thomas, Ollie Johnston	N/A
Desk- "Blue Cards"
4785	May 26, 1982	Sandahl Bergman, Dennis Spinney	Johnny Mathis
Edge of Wetness
4786	May 27, 1982	Diahann Carroll, Bob Uecker, Michelle Pfeiffer	N/A
Floyd R. Turbo- "Editorial Against Young People Playing Video Games in Arcades"
4787	May 28, 1982	Danny Thomas, Leonard Waxdeck & The Birdcallers	Glen Campbell ("There Are Blues", "An American Trilogy")
4788	May 31, 1982	David Brenner (guest host), Richard Simmons, Calvin Trillin	N/A

=== June ===
No.	Original release date	Guest(s)	Musical/entertainment guest(s)
4789	June 1, 1982	David Brenner (guest host), Dick Shawn	Nell Carter ("Take It Home", "Stormy Weather" and "Since I Fell for You")
4790	June 2, 1982	Joan Rivers (guest host), Joan Embery, William Shatner	Peter Allen
4791	June 3, 1982	Joan Rivers (guest host), Lynn Redgrave, Pete Barbutti, Mimi Kennedy	N/A
4792	June 4, 1982	Joan Rivers (guest host), Lucille Ball, Steve Guttenberg	Anthony Newley
4793	June 8, 1982	Peter Strauss	Buddy Rich
4794	June 9, 1982	Cassandra Peterson	Dionne Warwick
Desk- "New Woman's Guide to Getting Married"
4795	June 10, 1982	Dana Hill, Patty Weaver, Mary Ellen Shaver	N/A
4796	June 11, 1982	Dyan Cannon, Dr. Ruth Westheimer	N/A
Sketch- "G. Walter Schneer- Banking Industry"
4797	June 15, 1982	Hulk Hogan, George Miller, Brooke Shields	N/A
Desk- "Yearbook Captions"
4798	June 16, 1982	Margot Kidder, Dar Robinson	N/A
Desk- "Father's Day Suggestions"
4799	June 17, 1982	James Stewart, Kaleena Kiff	N/A
Desk- "Summer Festivals Around The U.S.A."
4800	June 18, 1982	Dr. Robert Lewis	Dave Brubeck Quartet, Phyllis Newman
Commercial Blackouts- 'Henry the 8th', 'Vangogh', 'Abraham Lincoln' and 'Patton'
4801	June 22, 1982	Bill Cosby	Dimitris Sgouros
Desk- "Blue Cards"
4802	June 23, 1982	George Archibald, Shelley Winters	N/A
Desk- "Naming the Baby"
4803	June 24, 1982	Kathleen McCartney	Dolly Parton
Edge of Wetness
4804	June 25, 1982	Angie Dickinson, Thalassa Cruso	Linda Hopkins
Stump the Band

=== July ===
No.	Original release date	Guest(s)	Musical/entertainment guest(s)
4805	July 5, 1982	David Brenner (guest host), Elizabeth Ashley, Ricardo Montalbán	Al Jarreau
4806	July 6, 1982	David Brenner (guest host), Paul Sorvino, Jack Klugman	N/A
4807	July 7, 1982	David Brenner (guest host), Robert Easton	Connie Stevens
4808	July 8, 1982	Joan Rivers (guest host), Joan Collins, George Plimpton	Rita Moreno
4809	July 9, 1982	Joan Rivers (guest host), Andrea Martin, Wayne Rogers, Lorna Luft	N/A
4810	July 12, 1982	Joan Rivers (guest host), Arnold Schwarzenegger, Richard Simmons	N/A
4811	July 13, 1982	Joan Rivers (guest host), Shelley Winters, Morgan Fairchild	N/A
4812	July 14, 1982	Joan Rivers (guest host), James Coco, Garry Shandling, Dr. Lendon Smith	N/A
4813	July 15, 1982	David Steinberg (guest host), Martin Mull, Betty Thomas, Pete Barbutti	N/A
4814	July 16, 1982	David Steinberg (guest host), John Candy, Charles Grodin	Joe Williams
4815	July 20, 1982	none	James Galway, Steve Lawrence
Desk- "Snapshots of Johnny's Vacation"
4816	July 21, 1982	Steve Allen (guest host), Susan Sarandon, Charles Nelson Reilly	N/A
Desk- Blue Cards
4817	July 22, 1982	Robin Williams	N/A
Desk- "Summer Movies"; Desk- "Foreign Commercials"; Desk- "Johnny talks about getting a letter from the Republican Presidential Commission in which he is addressed Dear Mr. Inc."
4818	July 23, 1982	Björn Borg, Jean Marsh, Paul Tavilla	N/A
4819	July 27, 1982	Albert Hague	Liberace
Desk- "Summer Vacations"
4820	July 28, 1982	Drew Barrymore	Larry Gatlin
Edge of Wetness
4821	July 29, 1982	Blake Clark, Fred Grandy	Buddy DeFranco, Terry Gibbs
Stump the Band
4822	July 30, 1982	Eddie Murphy, Randall "Tex" Cobb	Angela Bofill
Sketch- "The Royal Intruder"

=== August ===
No.	Original release date	Guest(s)	Musical/entertainment guest(s)
4823	August 3, 1982	Henry Winkler	Andy Williams
Desk- "Little Known Laws"
4824	August 4, 1982	Raymond Smullyan, Jimmy Aleck	N/A
Sketch- "Reagan/Brezhnev Conference"
4825	August 5, 1982	Jason Hardman (12-year-old librarian in Utah), Martina Navratilova	Itzhak Perlman
4826	August 6, 1982	Steven Wright	Kenny Rogers
Carnac the Magnificent
4827	August 10, 1982	Dr. Ruth Westheimer	Roy Clark
Desk- "Do You Remember My Mother (It's Daddy)"
4828	August 11, 1982	Dana Hill, Argus Hamilton	N/A
Desk- "Carson's Believe It or Stuff It"
4829	August 12, 1982	Charles Grodin, Steven Wright	Gerard Kenny
Desk- "Little Known Superstitions"
4830	August 13, 1982	George Burns, Peter Strauss	N/A
Sketch- "Evening News of 2002 with Zontar Rather"
4831	August 16, 1982	Joan Rivers (guest host), Daniel J. Travanti, Dick Shawn	N/A
4832	August 17, 1982	Joan Rivers (guest host), Dinah Shore, Charles Nelson Reilly	N/A
4833	August 18, 1982	Joan Rivers (guest host), Rock Hudson, Paul Williams	N/A
4834	August 19, 1982	Joan Rivers (guest host), Suzanne Somers, Betty White, Michele Lee	N/A
4835	August 20, 1982	Joan Rivers (guest host), Carol Channing, Tom Dreesen	N/A
4836	August 23, 1982	George Carlin (guest host), William Shatner, Paul Sorvino, Pete Barbutti	N/A
4837	August 24, 1982	Dick Cavett (guest host), Lynn Redgrave, June Allyson	Charles "Honi" Coles
4838	August 25, 1982	Dick Cavett (guest host), Rich Little, Helen Gurley Brown	N/A
Desk- "Blue Cards"
4839	August 26, 1982	Martin Mull (guest host), Debbie Reynolds, Betty Thomas	B.B. King
4840	August 27, 1982	Bill Cosby (guest host), Aileen Quinn, Diahann Carroll, Tanya Roberts	N/A
4841	August 31, 1982	Neil Simon, Bill Maher, Joe Garagiola	N/A
Desk- Johnny talks about 24 bike riders cycling from Anchorage, Alaska to Los Angeles in 80 days to benefit the Mental Health Society. The bicyclists are shown in the audience.

=== September ===
No.	Original release date	Guest(s)	Musical/entertainment guest(s)
4842	September 1, 1982	Robert Klein	Luciano Pavarotti
Desk- "Things to Do Over Labor Day Weekend"
4843	September 2, 1982	Dom DeLuise, Franklyn Ajaye	Phyllis Hyman
Desk- "Items Left by The President of NBC"
4844	September 3, 1982	Charles Nelson Reilly, Susie Petrucci, Mack & Jamie (the comedy duo of Mack Dryden & Jamie Alcroft)	N/A
Mighty Carson Art Players - G. Walter Schneer defends the airlines.
4845	September 7, 1982	Steve Landesberg, Cindy Morgan, Elden & Barbara Hathaway	N/A
Desk- "Blue Cards"
4846	September 8, 1982	Jerry Seinfeld	Tony Bennett
Desk- "Valleytalk"
4847	September 9, 1982	Maureen Sullivan, George Segal	N/A
Desk- "University of Burbank's Coursebook"
4848	September 10, 1982	Bert Convy, Dr. Carl Sagan	N/A
Edge of Wetness
4849	September 14, 1982	Melanie Chartoff, Garry Shandling	N/A
Desk- "Life Prolonging Tips"
4850	September 15, 1982	Mimi Kennedy	N/A
Desk- "Pilots That Didn't Make It"
4851	September 16, 1982	Ron Zanini	Marilyn Horne
Desk- "Carson Classified Ads"
4852	September 17, 1982	Tony Randall, William F. Buckley, Jr.	N/A
Sketch- "Tea-Time Movie"
4853	September 21, 1982	Richard Harris, Charlie Callas	N/A
Carnac the Magnificent
4854	September 22, 1982	Richard Benjamin	The Manhattan Transfer
Desk- "Replacement Shows"
4855	September 23, 1982	Bob Uecker, David Brenner, Georgia Frontiere	N/A
Desk- "Chuck Donaldson Gag"
4856	September 24, 1982	Robert Blake	N/A
Desk- "Foreign Commercials"
4857	September 27, 1982	Joan Rivers (guest host), Victoria Principal, Lily Tomlin	N/A
4858	September 28, 1982	Joan Rivers (guest host), Lana Turner, Erma Bombeck, Sarah Purcell	N/A
4859	September 29, 1982	Roy Clark (guest host), Shelley Long	Ben Vereen, Skiles and Henderson
This was Shelley Long's first talk show appearance on the show.
4860	September 30, 1982	George Carlin (guest host), Joan Embery, Bob Hope	Leslie Uggams

=== October ===
No.	Original release date	Guest(s)	Musical/entertainment guest(s)
4861	October 1, 1982	David Steinberg (guest host), Teri Garr	Anthony Newley
Desk- "Blue Cards"
4862	October 5, 1982	Sammy Davis, Jr, Smothers Brothers	N/A
Kevin Quinn Plays the Congas
4863	October 6, 1982	Wil Shriner, Debra Maffett	N/A
Desk- "Quotes of Politicians Quotations"
4864	October 7, 1982	Angie Dickinson	N/A
Edge of Wetness
4865	October 8, 1982	David Steinberg	Tom Jones
Desk- "How to Handle Hecklers"
4866	October 12, 1982	Buddy Hackett	Jim Stafford
Desk- "Little Known Baseball Statistics"
4867	October 13, 1982	Tim Conway, Ray Hanson	Pilobolus
Desk- "Pop Ups"
4868	October 14, 1982	Richard Belzer, Barbara Woodhouse	Joe Williams
Desk- "Children's Essays"
4869	October 15, 1982	Joan Rivers, Tetsuko Kuroyanagi	N/A
Floyd R. Turbo- "Editorial Against Hunters"
4870	October 18, 1982	Bill Cosby (guest host), Richard Simmons, Robert Urich	N/A
4871	October 19, 1982	Bill Cosby (guest host), Phyllis Diller, Jerry Lewis, Dana Hill	N/A
4872	October 20, 1982	Bill Cosby (guest host), Marilu Henner, Kelly Monteith	Mel Tormé
4873	October 21, 1982	Bill Cosby (guest host), Bob Newhart, Gary Coleman, Cathie Shirriff	N/A
4874	October 22, 1982	Bill Cosby (guest host), Juliet Prowse, Randall "Tex" Cobb	Freddie Hubbard
Desk- "Celebrity Yearbook"
4875	October 26, 1982	Bill Cosby, Uwe Kind	Janis Siegel
Desk- "Obscure Candidates"
4876	October 27, 1982	William Shatner, Rich Hall	Al Hirt
Desk- "Happy Birthday, Fred"; Desk- "Blue Cards"
4877	October 28, 1982	Pete Barbutti, Jason Pipoly	Leata Galloway
Desk- "Specialty Pumpkins"
4878	October 29, 1982	Steve Allen (guest host), Darrell Porter	Steve Lawrence
Blue Cards; This is the last time Steve Allen guest hosted The Tonight Show.

=== November ===
No.	Original release date	Guest(s)	Musical/entertainment guest(s)
4879	November 3, 1982	Maureen Murphy	Roberta Flack
Sketch- "Truthful Press Conference"
4880	November 4, 1982	Kim Novak, Charles Nelson Reilly	N/A
Desk- "Newspaper Clips"; Desk- "Foreign Commercials"
4881	November 5, 1982	George Burns, Richard Dawson, Melanie Chartoff	N/A
Mighty Carson Art Players- "International Family Feud"
4882	November 8, 1982	Suzanne Pleshette, Bill Maher	Janie Fricke
Stump the Band
4883	November 9, 1982	Ricky Schroder, David Sayh, Tony Trabert	N/A
Desk- "Miss Manners' Guide to Excruciatingly Correct Behavior"
4884	November 10, 1982	Alan King, Blake Clark	N/A
Edge of Wetness
4885	November 11, 1982	Martin Mull, Margot Kidder	Michael Iceberg
Desk- "Weather Fact Sheet"
4886	November 12, 1982	Steven Callahan	Glen Campbell
Desk- "Joke Rivalry Between the States"
4887	November 16, 1982	Richard Benjamin	Oak Ridge Boys
4888	November 17, 1982	Brian Taylor	Dionne Warwick
Carnac the Magnificent
4889	November 18, 1982	Shelley Winters	Jerry Lee Lewis
Mighty Carson Art Players- "Blackouts"; Desk- "Letters from Kids"
4890	November 19, 1982	Julie Andrews, Bob Uecker	N/A
Desk- "Facts About Barstow"
4891	November 23, 1982	Steven Wright, Karen Austin	Lena Horne
4892	November 24, 1982	Paul Sorvino	Free Flight
Desk- "Tom Turkey Letters"
4893	November 25, 1982	Robert Blake, George Kirby	N/A
Desk- "Things to Do During the Holiday Season"
4894	November 26, 1982	Dana Hill, Jimmy Aleck	N/A
Desk- "Celebrity Yearbook"
4895	November 29, 1982	Joan Rivers (guest host), Pete Barbutti, Teri Garr	Mac Davis
4896	November 30, 1982	Joan Rivers (guest host), Kirk Douglas, Vincent Price, Nancy Dussault	N/A

=== December ===
No.	Original release date	Guest(s)	Musical/entertainment guest(s)
4897	December 1, 1982	Joan Rivers (guest host), Valerie Bertinelli, David Brenner	Andy Williams
4898	December 2, 1982	Joan Rivers (guest host), Betty White	Tony Orlando
4899	December 3, 1982	Joan Rivers (guest host), Orson Welles, Brooke Shields, Joan Collins	N/A
4900	December 7, 1982	James Stewart, Garry Shandling	N/A
Desk- "Expensive Christmas Gifts"
4901	December 8, 1982	Phil Garner, Franklyn Ajaye, Erin Gray	N/A
Stump the Band
4902	December 9, 1982	Mary Tyler Moore	Linda Hopkins
Desk- "Alternate Names"
4903	December 10, 1982	Robert Mitchum	Barry Manilow
Desk- "Letters to Santa Claus"
4904	December 14, 1982	Pete Barbutti	N/A
Desk- "Christmas Cards One Might Get"
4905	December 15, 1982	Burt Reynolds, Bert Convy	N/A
Desk- "Newspaper Clips"
4906	December 16, 1982	Dudley Moore	N/A
New Products
4907	December 17, 1982	Sally Field, Thalassa Cruso	N/A
Desk- "Specialty Snowmen", Thalassa Cruso discusses taking care of Christmas trees
4908	December 28, 1982	Charles Nelson Reilly, Tillie Abrahamson, Cory Carson	N/A
Desk- "How Were You Born? Letters"
4909	December 29, 1982	Jim Fowler, Steve Landesberg	Joe Williams
Desk- "Things to Do on New Year's Eve"
4910	December 30, 1982	Kaleena Kiff, Suzanne Somers	Suzanne Somers ("Take Back Your Mink" and "Breaking Up Is Hard To Do")
Desk- "Little Known Dubious Achievements"
4911	December 31, 1982	Bill Maher, Jonathan Neal Brown	Tina Turner performed ("Rock 'n' Roll Widow" and "Steel Claw")
Desk- "Coverage of New York's Time Square"; Mighty Carson Art Players- "Zontar Rather"
