= List of The Tonight Show Starring Johnny Carson episodes (1983) =

Episodes in 1983

- No. of episodes: 179

Release
- Original network: NBC

Season chronology
- ← Previous; 1982 episodes Next → 1984 episodes

The following is a list of episodes of the television series The Tonight Show Starring Johnny Carson which aired in 1983. In October, 1962 Johnny Carson took over as host of the show from the previous host Jack Paar.

== 1983 ==
- Ed McMahon wears glasses full time starting with this season.

=== January ===
No.	Original release date	Guest(s)	Musical/entertainment guest(s)
4912	January 4, 1983	Carl Reiner, Greg Louganis, Ron O'Brien	N/A
Desk - "Psychic Predictions"
4913	January 5, 1983	Teri Garr, Tom Noddy	B.B. King
Edge of Wetness
4914	January 6, 1983	Richard Benjamin, Kelly Monteith	Pete Fountain
Desk - "Calendars"
4915	January 7, 1983	Jack Lemmon	Tanya Tucker
Desk - "Blue Cards"
4916	January 11, 1983	Michael Landon, Patti & Leah Barton	Maureen McGovern
Desk - "Little Known Disasters"
4917	January 12, 1983	George Carlin, George Segal	Snooky Young
Desk - "Joke Rivalry Between States"
4918	January 13, 1983	David Brenner	Johnny Mathis ("But She Loves Me")
Carnac the Magnificent
4919	January 14, 1983	Harvey Korman, Bruce Schwartz, Randall "Tex" Cobb	N/A
Stump the Band
4920	January 24, 1983	Joan Rivers (guest host), Henry Winkler, Richard Simmons, Cher	N/A
4921	January 25, 1983	Joan Rivers (guest host), Angie Dickinson, Garry Shandling, Gregory Harrison	N/A
4922	January 26, 1983	Joan Rivers (guest host), Bill Cosby, Margot Kidder	N/A
4923	January 27, 1983	Joan Rivers (guest host), Drew Barrymore	Jim Nabors
4924	January 28, 1983	Joan Rivers (guest host), Victoria Principal	Jennifer Holliday ("And I Am Telling You I'm Not Going")

=== February ===
No.	Original release date	Guest(s)	Musical/entertainment guest(s)
4,924	February 1, 1983	Anita Gillette	Tom Jones
Desk- "Pilots That Didn't Make It"
4,925	February 2, 1983	Alan King, Florence Sperbeck	N/A
Sketch - "President Reagan's Press Conference"
4,926	February 3, 1983	Buddy Hackett, William Shatner	N/A
Stump the Band
4,927	February 4, 1983	Steve Martin, Ali MacGraw	Dave Frishberg
Desk - "800 Area Code Telephone Numbers"; Desk- "Ideas of How Government Can Cut Deficit"
4,928	February 7, 1983	Lynn Redgrave, Charles Osborne	Lee Greenwood
Desk - "Kids Letters"
4,929	February 8, 1983	Joe Theismann, Charles Grodin	N/A
Desk - "Celebrity Yearbook"
4,930	February 9, 1983	Bette Davis, Richard Pryor	N/A
Desk - "Blue Cards"
4,931	February 10, 1983	David Steinberg, Roberta Burger	Maureen McGovern ("I'm All Smiles" and "Right As The Rain")
Desk - "Fan Mail"
4,932	February 11, 1983	Charles Nelson Reilly, Rodney Dangerfield, Bob Uecker	N/A
Stump the Band
4,933	February 15, 1983	Dom DeLuise	Glen Campbell
Desk - "Boy Scout Test"
4,934	February 16, 1983	Bob Newhart, L.H. Frymire	Jack Jones
Sketch - "The Winds of War"
4,935	February 17, 1983	Teresa Ganzel, Joe Bolster	Mac Davis
Desk - "Movies That Didn't Get Nominated"
4,936	February 18, 1983	Bridgette Andersen	Ernie Watts, Eydie Gormé
Edge of Wetness
4,937	February 22, 1983	Robert Klein	Julio Iglesias ("Gone With the Wind" and "Hey")
Desk - "Television Listing During Sweeps Week"
4,938	February 23, 1983	Sigourney Weaver, John Moschitta, Jr.	Peter Allen
Desk - "Guidelines in Case You Meet The Queen"
4,939	February 24, 1983	Albert Brooks, Ellen Barkin	The Weather Girls
Stump the Band
4,940	February 25, 1983	Jon Walter, Victoria Jackson, Rex Smith	N/A
Sketch - "Evening News with Mr. Rogers"

=== March ===
No.	Original release date	Guest(s)	Musical/entertainment guest(s)
4,941	March 1, 1983	David Brenner	Lionel Richie
Carnac the Magnificent
4,942	March 2, 1983	James Mason	Tony Bennett
Desk - "MASH Epilogue"
4,943	March 3, 1983	Swoosie Kurtz	Linda Ronstadt
Desk - "Carson's Believe It or Stuff It"
4,944	March 4, 1983	Tim Conway, Maureen Murphy, Jodie Foster	N/A
Desk - "Ed's Birthday"
4,945	March 15, 1983	Pamela Bellwood	Jim Stafford
Desk - "Joke Rivalry Between States"
4,946	March 16, 1983	Joan Rivers, Neil Simon	Stephen Bishop
Desk - "As The White House Turns"
4,947	March 17, 1983	Mariette Hartley, Sandra Bernhard	N/A
Stump the Band
4,948	March 18, 1983	Louis Gossett Jr., Argus Hamilton, Richard Kline	N/A
Edge of Wetness
4,949	March 22, 1983	Lesley Ann Warren, Charlie Hill	James Galway
Desk - "Blue Cards"
4,950	March 23, 1983	Steven Wright, Ted Lange	Sheena Easton
Stump the Band
4,951	March 24, 1983	Marsha Mason	Janie Fricke
Desk - "Cycle of Life in Los Angeles"
4,952	March 25, 1983	Teri Garr, Paul Provenza, Jennifer O'Neill	N/A
Blackouts - 'Fantasy Island', 'Lassie', 'Twilight Zone', 'American Bandstand' and 'Gunsmoke'.
4,953	March 29, 1983	Sharon Gless, Jimmy Connors	Placido Domingo
Talk with Ed About His Boat
4,954	March 30, 1983	Lynn Redgrave, Bobby Kelton	Oak Ridge Boys
Desk - "Congressional Jobs Bill"
4,955	March 31, 1983	Jack Lemmon, Victoria Jackson	Ross Tompkins
Desk - "Easter Bonnets"

=== April ===
No.	Original release date	Guest(s)	Musical/entertainment guest(s)
4,956	April 1, 1983	Steve Landesberg, Ana Alicia	Ron McCroby
4,957	April 5, 1983	Franklyn Ajaye	Julio Iglesias
Carnac the Magnificent
4,958	April 6, 1983	Gregory Hines, Calvin Trillin	Sharon Robinson
Desk - "Upcoming Mini-Series"
4,959	April 7, 1983	Susan Sarandon	Roy Clark
Desk - "Tax Advice"
4,960	April 18, 1983	Joan Rivers (guest host), Joe Piscopo, Donna Mills	Rita Moreno ("Get Happy")
4,961	April 19, 1983	Joan Rivers (guest host), David Steinberg, Betty White	N/A
4,962	April 20, 1983	Joan Rivers (guest host), David Brenner	Bernadette Peters
4,963	April 21, 1983	Joan Rivers (guest host), Robert Blake, John James	Engelbert Humperdinck
4,964	April 22, 1983	Joan Rivers (guest host), George Peppard, Susan Saint James	Beverly Sills
4,965	April 26, 1983	Sammy Davis, Jr., James Sikking	N/A
Desk - "Cable Television Shows"
4,966	April 27, 1983	Nastassja Kinski	N/A
Desk - "Hitler's Diary"
4,967	April 28, 1983	Charles Nelson Reilly, Garry Shandling, Audrie J. Neenan	N/A
Mighty Carson Art Players - "Consumer Supporter with David Howitzer"
4,968	April 29, 1983	Samantha Smith, David Weiss, Jennifer Beals	Bob & Ray

=== May ===
No.	Original release date	Guest(s)	Musical/entertainment guest(s)
4,969	May 2, 1983	James Stewart	Ron McCroby
Desk - "'My Mother' Essays"
4,970	May 3, 1983	Buddy Hackett, Linda Shayne	Joe Williams
Carpet Samples; Desk - "As The White House Turns"
4,971	May 4, 1983	Harmon Baker, Rich Hall	N/A
Desk - "What the Next Fifty Years Would Be"
4,972	May 5, 1983	Emmanuel Lewis, David Steinberg, Mary Frann	N/A
Mighty Carson Art Players - "President Reagan's Letter To a Russian Girl"
4,973	May 6, 1983	Don Rickles, Kathleen Beller	N/A
Desk - "Famous Mothers"
4,974	May 10, 1983	Roy Scheider, Bill Maher	Louise Mandrell
Desk - "New Office Etiquette"
4,975	May 11, 1983	George Burns, Jacqueline Bisset	Conte Candoli
Edge of Wetness
4,976	May 12, 1983	David Brenner	The Barrett Sisters
Desk - "Pilots That Didn't Make It"
4,977	May 13, 1983	Donald Sutherland, Martin Mull	Leata Galloway
Blackouts - 'Hard's Collar', 'Telephone' and 'Great Masters'.
4,978	May 17, 1983	Albert Brooks, Brooke Shields	N/A
Desk - "Classified Ads"; Desk - "Fascinating Facts"; Desk - "List of Kids' Inventions"
4,979	May 18, 1983	Bob Newhart, Anthony Quinn, Julie Lynne Hayek	N/A
Talk with Ed About their First Girlfriends
4,980	May 19, 1983	Bert Convy, Jerry Seinfeld	Dave Brubeck Quartet
Desk - "Ways for Los Angeles to Raise Money"
4,981	May 20, 1983	Suzanne Somers, Blake Clark, Kathleen Beller	N/A
Stump the Band
4,982	May 24, 1983	Charles Grodin, Mary Denham	B.B. King
Location - "Burbank Bridge"
4,983	May 25, 1983	Sunny Haws & Jennifer Watson	Buddy Rich, Martina Arroyo
Sketch - "Johnny La Lonne"
4,984	May 26, 1983	Mel Blanc	Steve Lawrence
Desk - "Blue Cards"
4,985	May 27, 1983	Carl Reiner	Ellen Greene ("Somewhere That's Green", "Suddenly Seymour")
Stump the Band

=== June ===
No.	Original release date	Guest(s)	Musical/entertainment guest(s)
4,986	June 1, 1983	Patrick Macnee, Pete Barbutti	N/A
4,987	June 7, 1983	Christopher Reeve	Leonard Waxdeck & The Birdcallers
Desk - "International Symbol Signs"
4,988	June 8, 1983	Joan Rivers, Joe Garagiola	Sergio Mendes ("Never Gonna Let You Go")
Desk - "Summer Movies"
4,989	June 9, 1983	Richard Pryor, Ally Sheedy, Rod Hull	N/A
Sketch - "Harlequin Romances for Macho Guy"
4,990	June 10, 1983	Roger Moore, Teresa Ganzel	Donna Summer
Desk - "Blue Cards"
4,991	June 14, 1983	Bill Cosby, George Segal	N/A
Desk - "How to Be a Really Nice Person"
4,992	June 15, 1983	Dorothy Fuldheim, Tom Noddy	Maureen McGovern ("Mr. Paganini" and "The Promise")
Edge of Wetness
4,993	June 16, 1983	Robin Williams, Jim Brown III	cast of Dreamgirls
Desk - "As The White House Turns"
4,994	June 17, 1983	Michael Landon, Pete Barbutti	Michael Martin Murphey
Sketch - 'Early to Bed', 'Animal Cries', 'Old Dog', and 'Soldiers Never Die'.
4,995	June 21, 1983	Dyan Cannon	Tony Bennett
Desk - "Little Known Los Angeles Olympic Events"
4,996	June 22, 1983	Steve Landesberg, Sandra Bernhard	José Feliciano
Desk - "Phone Call to Space Shuttle"
4,997	June 23, 1983	Lauren Bacall, Jim Fowler	Pete Fountain
Sketch - "Commercial Actors School"
4,998	June 24, 1983	Eddie Murphy, Jennifer Richards, Reggie Joule	N/A

=== July ===
No.	Original release date	Guest(s)	Musical/entertainment guest(s)
4,999	July 4, 1983	Joan Rivers (guest host), Christopher Atkins, Richard Simmons	Charo
5,000	July 5, 1983	Joan Rivers (guest host), Elizabeth Ashley, Charles Nelson Reilly	Tom Jones
Joan Rivers celebrates Johnny Carson's 5,000th episode as the host of The Tonight Show.
5,001	July 6, 1983	Joan Rivers (guest host), Walter Matthau, Dick Shawn	N/A
5,002	July 7, 1983	Joan Rivers (guest host), Jerry Seinfeld, Mr. Rogers	N/A
5,003	July 8, 1983	Joan Rivers (guest host), Sylvester Stallone, Charlie Callas, Morgan Fairchild	N/A
5,004	July 19, 1983	Peter Strauss	Amanda McBroom
Talk with Ed About Surgery
5,005	July 20, 1983	Adriana Caselotti, David Brenner	Lee Greenwood
Desk - "Vacation Snapshots"
5,006	July 21, 1983	Suzanne Pleshette	Anthony Newley
Carnac the Magnificent
5,007	July 22, 1983	Chevy Chase, David Sayh, Karen Salkin	N/A
Desk - "Joke Rivalry Between the States"
5,008	July 26, 1983	David Steinberg, Linda Evans	Free Flight
Desk - "What's In and What's Out"
5,009	July 27, 1983	Lynn Redgrave	B.B. King
Desk - "F.B.I. Most Wanted Posters"
5,010	July 28, 1983	Samantha Smith, Joan Collins	N/A
Desk - "Unnecessary Products"
5,011	July 29, 1983	Carrie Fisher, Garry Shandling	David Grisman Quintet
Sketch - "Carter/Reagan Presidential Debate"

=== August ===
No.	Original release date	Guest(s)	Musical/entertainment guest(s)
5,012	August 2, 1983	John Davidson	N/A
Desk - "Blue Cards"
5,013	August 3, 1983	Robert Blake	Joe Williams, Nadja Salerno-Sonnenberg
Edge of Wetness
5,014	August 4, 1983	Diane Lane	Diana Ross, Ron McCroby
Desk - "Summer Lore"
5,015	August 5, 1983	Robert Klein, Cynthia Rhodes, Howard Finster	N/A
Stump the Band
5,016	August 9, 1983	Ana Alicia, Martina Navratilova	Itzhak Perlman
Desk - "Items That Washed Ashore"
5,017	August 10, 1983	Maureen Stapleton, Bill Maher	Buddy Rich
Sketch - "Telephone Operator Interview"
5,018	August 11, 1983	Charles Nelson Reilly, Ted Wass	Tanya Tucker
Desk - "New Products"
5,019	August 12, 1983	Michael Reagan, Rodney Dangerfield	Donna Theodore ("The House I Live In")
Floyd R. Turbo - "Opposed to Women Newscasters"
5,020	August 22, 1983	David Brenner (guest host), Shelley Long, Joe Garagiola	Rita Moreno
Desk - Talk with Doc
5,021	August 23, 1983	David Brenner (guest host), Richard Lewis	N/A
Desk - "Letters from Kids"
5,022	August 24, 1983	Garry Shandling (guest host), Joan Embery, Pete Barbutti	N/A
Garry Shandling makes his Tonight Show debut as guest host.
5,023	August 25, 1983	Barbara Mandrell (guest host), Patrick Duffy, George Lindsey, Helen Gurley Brown	N/A
5,024	August 26, 1983	John Denver (guest host), Pam Dawber, Tony Danza	N/A
5,025	August 30, 1983	Angie Dickinson, Rick Ducommun	Shelly West
Desk - "Special Interest Groups"
5,026	August 31, 1983	Teri Garr, Maureen Murphy	Charlie Byrd, The Great Guitars
Edge of Wetness

=== September ===
No.	Original release date	Guest(s)	Musical/entertainment guest(s)
5,027	September 1, 1983	Mariette Hartley, Karen Salkin	Mack & Jamie (comedy duo)
Desk - "Weather Cycle"
5,028	September 2, 1983	Dyan Cannon, Bob Uecker	Linda Hopkins
Sketch - "Weightlifter Who Use Steroids Interview"
5,029	September 6, 1983	Shelley Winters, Teri Copley	Amanda McBroom
Desk - "Pilots That Didn't Make It"
5,030	September 7, 1983	Shirley MacLaine, Betty White	N/A
Sketch - "Malibu Restaurant"
5,031	September 8, 1983	Bill Cosby, Victoria Jackson	Chuck Mangione
Carnac the Magnificent
5,032	September 9, 1983	Richard Benjamin	Linda Ronstadt
Desk - "Public Service Announcements"
5,033	September 13, 1983	Teddy Bergeron	Liberace
Desk - "Fan Mail"
5,034	September 14, 1983	Stephanie Zimbalist, Steven Wright	Lionel Richie ("All Night Long" and "Lady")
Desk - "The Good Side of Bad News"
5,035	September 15, 1983	Melinda Culea	Jennifer Holliday ("I Am Love" and "Let Me Wait")
Stump the Band
5,036	September 16, 1983	George Burns, Victoria Principal, Randall "Tex" Cobb	N/A
5,037	September 20, 1983	Dick Cavett, Rebecca Holden, Chris & Lisa Scott	N/A
Aunt Blabby
5,038	September 21, 1983	Michael Caine, Mary Kay Place	James Galway
5,039	September 22, 1983	Cybill Shepherd, Kelly Monteith	Manhattan Transfer
Sketch - "Burbank Wall and Burbank Stone"
5,040	September 23, 1983	Yul Brynner, Madeline Kahn	Joe Williams
Desk - "Homework School of The Air"
5,041	September 26, 1983	Joan Rivers (guest host), James Coco, David Hasselhoff, Shelley Winters	N/A
5,042	September 27, 1983	Joan Rivers (guest host), Kate Jackson	N/A
5,043	September 28, 1983	Joan Rivers (guest host), Larry Hagman, Betty White, Garry Shandling	N/A
5,044	September 29, 1983	Joan Rivers (guest host), David Brenner, Tony Danza, Erma Bombeck	N/A
5,045	September 30, 1983	Joan Rivers (guest host), Lorenzo Lamas, Eileen Brennan, Dr. Ruth Westheimer	N/A

=== October ===
No.	Original release date	Guest(s)	Musical/entertainment guest(s)
5,046	October 4, 1983	Peter Ustinov	Tony Bennett
Desk - "Blue Cards"
5,047	October 5, 1983	Sean Connery, Keenen Ivory Wayans	Tania Maria
Desk - "Mail Bag" - Johnny recounts a viewer's lengthy efforts to be removed from a computerized mailing list by posing as a dog
5,048	October 7, 1983	Bob Newhart, James Stephens, Ronnie Porter	N/A
Desk - "Tonight Show Scrapbook": Johnny shows photos depicting moments, supposedly from the show, which didn't make it into the recent anniversary special
5,049	October 11, 1983	Dudley Moore, Tom Baker, Harvey Fierstein	N/A
5,050	October 12, 1983	Charles Grodin	Peabo Bryson, Roberta Flack
Desk - "Tonight Show Quiz"
5,051	October 13, 1983	Tim Conway, Holly Palance	Martina Arroyo
Stump the Band
5,052	October 14, 1983	Bill Cosby, Calvin Trillin	Maureen McGovern ("Strike Up the Band")
Edge of Wetness
5,053	October 18, 1983	Stefanie Powers, Alan King	N/A
Desk - "Lies of The Eighties"
5,054	October 19, 1983	Bert Convy, Julie Walters	Pete Fountain
Desk - "How Do Dey Do Dat?"
5,055	October 20, 1983	Dom DeLuise, Deborah Shelton	Toots Thielemans
Desk - "Halloween Pumpkins"
5,056	October 21, 1983	Sammy Davis, Jr., Jeff Goldblum, Julie Walters	N/A

=== November ===
No.	Original release date	Guest(s)	Musical/entertainment guest(s)
5,057	November 1, 1983	Estelle Parsons, David Brenner	N/A
Desk - "Letters from Kids"
5,058	November 2, 1983	Steve Landesberg	Nadja Salerno-Sonnenberg
Desk - "Go to Bed With a Star"
5,059	November 3, 1983	Mariel Hemingway, Pete Barbutti	N/A
Desk - "Public Service Announcements"
5,060	November 4, 1983	Buddy Hackett, Elaine Stritch	N/A
Stump the Band
5,061	November 8, 1983	Barbara Walters, David Steinberg	N/A
Desk - "Fan Mail"
5,062	November 9, 1983	Robert Klein, Merie Earle	Nell Carter ("You Are")
Desk - "New York Blackout"
5,063	November 10, 1983	none	Bette Midler ("Beast of Burden" and "Come Back Jimmy Dean")
Band Number - "12 O'Clock"
5,064	November 11, 1983	Paul T. Kendall (1983 hollering contest champion), Thalassa Cruso	Marilyn Horne
Sketch - "Coldfinger"
5,065	November 15, 1983	Gilda Radner, Walter Cronkite	Karen Akers ("Nevertheless, I'm in Love with You" and "Maybe")
Desk - "Joke Rivalry Between the States"
5,066	November 16, 1983	Bob Uecker, Stepfanie Kramer	Vic Damone
Edge of Wetness
5,067	November 17, 1983	Ernest St. George, Jerry Seinfeld, Lynn Redgrave	N/A
Sketch - "Monday Night Football with William F. Buckley"
5,068	November 18, 1983	Tracy Scoggins, Argus Hamilton	Smokey Robinson
Stump the Band
5,069	November 21, 1983	Diahann Carroll, Dennis Quaid	N/A
Desk - "Kids Thanksgiving Letters"
5,070	November 22, 1983	George Peppard	Julio Iglesias
Carnac the Magnificent
5,071	November 23, 1983	James Stewart	Oak Ridge Boys
Desk - "Shower With a Star"
5,072	November 24, 1983	Robert Blake, Jim Carrey, Bud Greenspan	N/A
Desk - "Blue Cards"
5,073	November 25, 1983	Mariette Hartley, Ronnie Shakes	N/A
Singing Dog Contest
5,074	November 28, 1983	Joan Rivers (guest host), John Travolta, Olivia Newton-John, Peter Ustinov	N/A
5,075	November 29, 1983	Joan Rivers (guest host), Dick Cavett, Margot Kidder, Howie Mandel	N/A
5,076	November 30, 1983	Joan Rivers (guest host), Joan Collins, Jerry Seinfeld	Boy George

=== December ===
No.	Original release date	Guest(s)	Musical/entertainment guest(s)
5,077	December 1, 1983	Joan Rivers (guest host), Vincent Price, Linda Gray	N/A
5,078	December 2, 1983	Joan Rivers (guest host), Marilu Henner	Andy Gibb
5,079	December 6, 1983	Red Skelton, Sterling Hayden	Donna Theodore ("Memory")
Desk - "Words"
5,080	December 7, 1983	Carl Reiner, Julie Walters	N/A
Desk - "How Do Dey Do Dat?"
5,081	December 8, 1983	Michael Landon, Bill Maher	Joe Williams
Desk - "Ultimate Gifts"
5,082	December 9, 1983	Charles Grodin, Mike Rozier	Bob & Ray
Sketch - "Dr. Joyce Sisters"
5,083	December 13, 1983	Jack Lemmon, Wil Shriner	Buddy Rich
Desk - "Christmas Television Specials"
5,084	December 14, 1983	John Davidson, Alan King	N/A
Stump the Band
5,085	December 15, 1983	Mel Brooks, Teri Garr	N/A
Sketch - "David Howitzer- Consumer Supporter"
5,086	December 16, 1983	none	Andy Williams
Desk - "New Products"; Desk- "Letters from Kids"
5,087	December 27, 1983	Markie Post	Barry Manilow
Desk - "Cold Weather"
5,088	December 28, 1983	George Segal, Garry Shandling	N/A
Desk - "Dating Game"
5,089	December 29, 1983	Tony Randall, Father Guido Sarducci, Cyndi James-Reese	N/A
Desk - "New Year's Eve Toasts"
5,090	December 30, 1983	David Letterman, Jim Turner	Jeffrey Osborne
Desk - "Predictions"
