= Eve Marie Shahoian =

American singer-songwriter

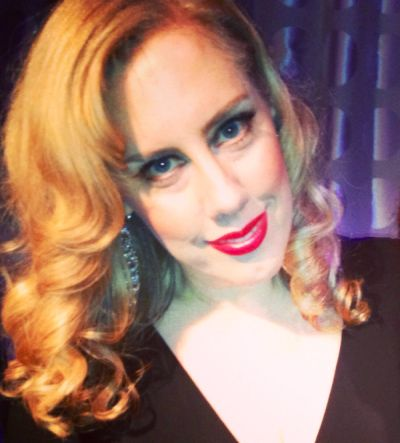
- Eve Marie Shahoian

Background information
- Born: Oakland, California, U.S.
- Genres: Jazz, classical crossover
- Occupation: Singer
- Instrument: Vocals
- Years active: 1980–present
- Labels: Heartsong
- Website: www.evemarieshahoian.com

Eve Marie Shahoian is an American classical crossover and jazz singer-songwriter. She performs as 'Eve Marie' or 'Eve Shahoian' and is the creator-composer of the album Waiting for You.

== Early life ==
Eve Marie Shahoian grew up in Oakland, California. She was considered a child vocal prodigy who began performing regularly in the 1980s on television, concerts, symphony, and musical theater. She attended Holy Names University in Oakland and graduated in 2004 with a master's degree in Vocal pedagogy.

== Career ==
During her early singing career, Shahoian appeared on The Tonight Show, The Mike Douglas Show, Just Kidding, San Francisco Press Club, French Club, and Circle Star Theater, and was a featured guest on TV and radio stations KGO, KPIX, KRON, KTVU, and KEMO. Shahoian has performed as a soloist several times with the Oakland Symphony. As a child, Shahoian performed with the Oakland Symphony under the direction of the late Calvin Simmons. As a teen, she performed with the Oakland Symphony's maestro Maxim Shostakovich. As an adult, she has performed at the Rrazz Room in San Francisco. She continues to compose, perform, and teach music in the San Francisco Bay area.

== Television appearances ==
- 1980 The Tonight Show with Johnny Carson (Episode 2405)
- 1980 The Mike Douglas Show
- 1980 Just Kidding
- 1981 That's Incredible
- 1983 The John Davidson Show

== Discography ==
Year	Album
2009	Waiting For You

== Recognition ==
Year	Award
2011	Billboard World Song Contest: "Honorable Mention" for original composition "Waiting For You"
2011	Delta Air Lines World Wide Featured Artist
