= A Lousy Ten Grand =

- Directed by: Kelly Monteith
- Written by: Kelly Monteith
- Produced by: Michael Dains
- Starring: Kelly Monteith; Bahar Soomekh
- Cinematography: Oktay Ortabasi
- Edited by: Leslie Ortabasi
- Distributed by: Phoenicia Pictures
- Release date: November 5, 2004
- Running time: 98 minutes
- Country: United States
- Language: English
- Budget: $100,000

A Lousy Ten Grand is a 2004 Vanguard Productions movie written by, directed and starring the stand-up comedian Kelly Monteith.

== Plot summary ==
Ted Beckerwith (Monteith) is an unsuccessful family man who finds himself in severe debt to a loan shark (Joey Travolta). In attempt to pay off his $10,000, he becomes involved in a plan to marry a foreigner for a price.
