= Sean Morey (comedian) =

American comedian

- Born: June 7, 1953 (age 72); Nyack, New York, United States
- Children: Megan Elizabeth Morey
- Website: www.seanmorey.com

Sean Morey (born June 7, 1953) is an American stand-up comedian and singer whose songs include "The Man Song", "A Hairy Ass" and "Dear Santa". Morey has made several television appearances, and has been called "The Godfather of Boston Comedy."

== Early life ==
Morey was born in Nyack, New York and grew up in Longport, New Jersey, on the south Jersey Shore, where he was a lifeguard for the Longport Beach Patrol and was senior class president at Atlantic City High School. He graduated from Northeastern University in Boston with a degree in Speech Communication.

== Career ==
Morey started his comedy career in Boston as a street entertainer on the Boston Common, at Faneuil Hall Marketplace, and in Harvard Square. In 1977 he opened Sean Morey's Comedy School and did a one-man show at Boston's Charles Playhouse that ran for nine months. He is largely credited with starting the Boston comedy scene. It was his work there that earned him the moniker, "The Godfather of Boston Comedy."

Morey moved to Los Angeles in 1978 and won the LA Comedy Contest in 1979. There he was spotted by Jim McCauley, the comedy talent-scout for Johnny Carson. Morey subsequently performed three times on the Tonight Show with Johnny Carson; and later three times with Jay Leno's version of the show.

Comic songs such as: "The Man Song;" "The Woman Song;" "A Hairy Ass;" "It's All About Me;" "The Toddler Song;" "Dear Santa;" "I Think it's Gonna be a Great Day;" "I Think it's Gonna be a Bad Day;" "The Man Who Doesn't Exist;" "Repo Man is Coming to Town;" and "Ghost Chicken in The Sky" (the latter being a parody of the classic country song "(Ghost) Riders in The Sky") are Morey's hallmark. He has appeared on dozens of other TV shows; and is a recurring guest on The Bob & Tom Show.

Morey has performed for over 37 years at comedy clubs, colleges, casinos, theaters and on cruise ships; and his comedy songs are played on English speaking radio stations around the world. The phrase "Reverse Life Cycle," which is often attributed to George Carlin or Andy Rooney, actually belongs to Sean Morey.

== Albums ==
=== Studio albums ===
- 1997 - He's The Man
- 1998 - I Did It Her Way
- 1999 - When a Man Loves a TV
- 2000 - I Think It's Gonna Be A Great Day!
- 2001 - The Man Who Doesn't Exist!
- 2005 - Sex Now

=== Compilations ===
- Sean Morey's Best Songs (Volume One)
- Sean Morey's Best Songs (Volume Two)

== Singles ==
Year	Single	Peak positions	Album
Year	Single	US Country	Album
1998	"The Man Song"	70	He's the Man
