= Steve Landesberg =

American actor (1936–2010)

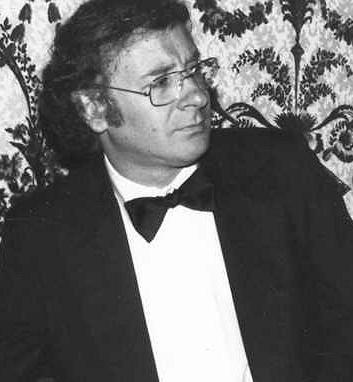
- Landesberg in 1979
- Born: Stephen Landesberg; November 23, 1936; New York, New York, U.S.
- Died: December 20, 2010 (aged 74); Los Angeles, California, U.S.
- Occupations: Actor; comedian
- Years active: 1971–2009
- Spouse: Nancy Ross (m. 1986)
- Children: 1

Steve Landesberg (November 23, 1936 – December 20, 2010) was an American actor and comedian known for his role as the erudite, unflappable police detective Arthur P. Dietrich on the ABC sitcom Barney Miller, for which he was nominated for three Emmy Awards. He appeared in 124 episodes, from the last episode of the 1975 season until the end of the series in 1982.

== Life and career ==
Stephen Landesberg was born on November 23, 1936, in New York City, in the Bronx, to Ann Landesberg, a milliner, and Abraham Landesberg, a grocery store owner. He was Jewish. He was part of improv group New York Stickball Team, which performed several shows that aired on cable television shortly after Barney Miller went off the air.

Landesberg had a successful career as a stand-up comedian, often appearing on Johnny Carson's The Tonight Show. He was fond of using celebrity impersonations and dialects in his monologues, and employed them for comic effect. A dramatic western story had Landesberg as Gregory Peck speaking with Belle Starr, who spoke with an incongruous accent: "Vell! Look vot de cat dragged in! De big, toff gon-slinger! I'm ronning away with Cochise."

Landesberg was a member of the cast of the 1974 CBS situation comedy Paul Sand in Friends and Lovers, and co-starred in the TV pilot Black Bart, a spin-off of Blazing Saddles. He made guest appearances on The Rockford Files, Law & Order, Saturday Night Live, The Golden Girls, Ghost Whisperer, That '70s Show and Everybody Hates Chris. He starred in Starz's original show Head Case as Dr. Myron Finkelstein. He appeared in the motion pictures Wild Hogs, Leader of the Band, and Forgetting Sarah Marshall.

He attempted a comeback to television playing a public defender in Seattle in an unsold sitcom pilot, The Best Defense, later aired on June 19, 1995, on ABC.

== Celebrity spokesman ==
In the mid-1980s, Landesberg was the spokesman in TV and print advertisements for Northwestern Bell's long-distance telephone services. He also was a TV spokesman for AAMCO Transmissions in the 1980s and early 1990s, for Canadian Airlines in 1990, and for Office Depot in the 1990s.

== Personal life ==
He and his wife, Nancy Ross Landesberg, had a daughter, Elizabeth.

During his years as a stand-up comedian, he pronounced his surname "Lands-berg", the first "e" being silent. Toward the end of his tenure on Barney Miller he amended the pronunciation to three syllables: "Lan-des-berg", to reflect the spelling of his name.

Throughout his career, Landesberg was noncommittal about his age and year of birth. At the time of his death, many news outlets mistakenly reported his age as 65; some never corrected that story. In acknowledging that he was actually nine years older than he had long claimed, his daughter Elizabeth said he had provided varying birth dates over the years. "He got kind of a late start in show business," she explained, "so he tried to straddle the generations. He fooled the whole world. People were surprised to think he was even 65." Landesberg commented on the issue in a 1979 Washington Post profile for which he refused to give his age:

Let's just say I started late. It hurts you with casting directors... If you tell them your age–let's say you're middle-aged–and they've never heard of you, they figure you're no good, or else they would've heard of you already. I tell my friends not to tell their ages.

== Death ==
Landesberg died from colon cancer on December 20, 2010, aged 74. He was cremated.

== Partial filmography ==
- Bewitched, Season 8, Episode 11: "The Warlock in the Grey Flannel Suit" (1971) - Beatnik
- You've Got to Walk It Like You Talk It or You'll Lose That Beat (1971) - Men's Room Attendant
- Blade (1973) - Debaum
- Black Bart (1975, TV Pilot) - Reb Jordan
- Barney Miller (1975–1982, TV Series) - Det. Sgt. Arthur Dietrich / Father Paul
- The Rockford Files, Season 3, Episode 12: "There's One in Every Port" (1977) - Kenny Hollywood
- Sports Fan (1985) - Himself (Host)
- Leader of the Band (1987) - Eddie Layton
- Doubles (1991) - George
- The Golden Girls - Dr. Halperin, psychiatrist (3 episodes)
- Ladybugs (1992) - Dr. Von Kemp (uncredited)
- Little Miss Millions (1993) - Harvey Lipschitz
- Marsupilami (1993) - Eduardo (voice)
- The Crazysitter (1994) - Detective Bristol
- The Souler Opposite (1998) - Himself
- Puppet (1999) - Charles
- Gas (2004) - Sam
- A Lousy 10 Grand (2004) - Prosecutor
- That 70s Show (2006), Season 8, Episode 19: "Sheer Heart Attack" - Cal
- Wild Hogs (2007) - Accountant
- Forgetting Sarah Marshall (2008) - Dr. Rosenbaum
- Everybody Hates Chris (2009, TV Series) - Mr. Levine
