= David Brenner =

American comedian and actor (1936–2014)

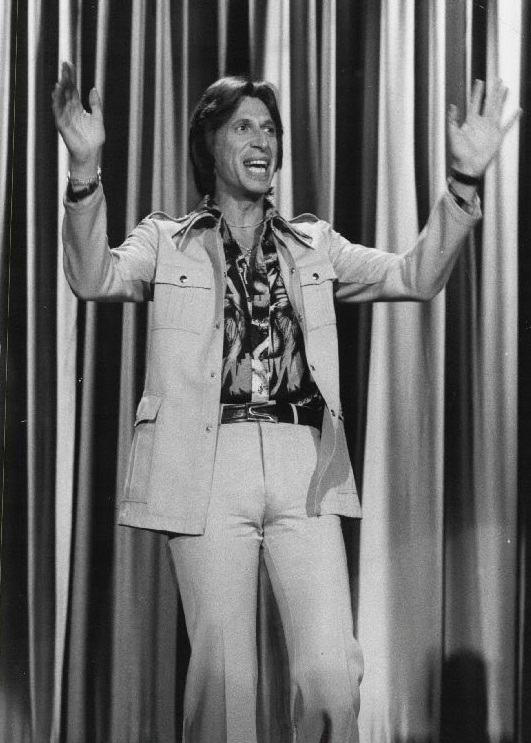
- Brenner in June 1976 on The Tonight Show Starring Johnny Carson
- Born: David Norris Brenner; February 4, 1936; Philadelphia, Pennsylvania, U.S.
- Died: March 15, 2014 (aged 78); New York City, U.S.
- Education: Temple University
- Occupations: Standup comedian, actor, author and filmmaker
- Spouses: Geraldine Judith Leno (m. 1964; div. 1967) Elizabeth Slater (m. 2000; div. 2003) Ruth Brenner (m. 2011)
- Partner(s): Charisse Brody; Tai Babilonia (2002–2009)

Comedy career
- Years active: 1969–2013
- Medium: Stand-up, television
- Genres: Observational comedy, self-deprecation, topical comedy

David Norris Brenner (February 4, 1936 – March 15, 2014) was an American stand-up comedian, actor and author. The most frequent guest on The Tonight Show Starring Johnny Carson in the 1970s and 1980s, Brenner "was a pioneer of observational comedy". His friend, comedian Richard Lewis, described Brenner as "the king of hip, observational comedy".

== Early life ==
Brenner was born to Jewish parents in 1936 and raised in South and West Philadelphia. His father, Louis, was a vaudeville comedian, singer and dancer, performing under the stage name of Lou Murphy, who gave up his career and a film contract to please Brenner's grandfather, a rabbi, who objected to his working on the Sabbath. Once David became successful, he regularly sent his parents on cruises, and both of Brenner's parents would eventually die at advanced ages while on cruises aboard the Queen Elizabeth 2, approximately two years apart.

After high school, Brenner spent two years in the U.S. Army, serving in the 101st Airborne and as a cryptographer of the 595th Signal Corps in Böblingen, Germany. After being discharged, he attended Temple University, where he majored in mass communication and graduated with honors.

== Career ==
Brenner was a writer, director or producer of 115 television documentaries and headed the documentary units of Westinghouse Broadcasting and Metromedia, winning nearly 30 awards including an Emmy, before moving to comedy. His first paid gig was at The Improv in June 1969, and following that he frequently performed at clubs in Greenwich Village. Brenner was ranked No. 53 on Comedy Central Presents: 100 Greatest Stand-Ups of All Time. At one point, he had appeared more often on major TV talk shows than any other entertainer. He also wrote five books, and starred in four HBO Specials.

=== Books ===
Brenner released the comedy album Excuse Me, Are You Reading That Paper? on MCA Records in 1983. The title arose from a gag in the album wherein a fellow passenger on a subway asked Brenner if he was reading a newspaper on which he was sitting. Brenner stood up, turned the page, sat down and said, "Well, yes I am." Brenner also penned five books including Soft Pretzels With Mustard (1983), Revenge is the Best Exercise (1984), Nobody Ever Sees You Eat Tuna Fish (1986), If God Wanted Us to Travel... (1990), and I Think There's a Terrorist in My Soup: How to Survive Personal and World Problems with Laughter—Seriously (2003), which was also released as an audiobook.

=== Television ===
After making his national television debut on The Tonight Show Starring Johnny Carson in 1971, Brenner became one of the program's most frequent guests, making 158 appearances. He also guest-hosted for Johnny Carson 75 times between 1975 and 1984.

Brenner was the star of the 1976 TV series Snip, which was inspired by the film Shampoo and set in a hair dressing salon. The situation comedy was shelved by NBC shortly before its broadcast premiere, because network executives became nervous about a supporting character who would have been one of the first gay characters on television in an American sitcom. Years later, Brenner said, "They made up all kinds of excuses, but the reason Snip was pulled is we had an actor who was gay and who played a gay part. They were afraid to have a gay on television."

In 1986, King World Entertainment gave Brenner his own 30-minute syndicated late-night talk show, Nightlife, in an attempt to compete with Carson, but it was cancelled after one season. The show premiered September 8, 1986, on 102 stations and was touted as "alternative". Filmed in Manhattan and featuring a casually dressed Brenner, it was unique among the late night talk genre for not having a monologue. It gave some comedians, such as Bobby Slayton, their national television premieres.

In addition to the Tonight Show, Brenner also appeared on The Ed Sullivan Show, The David Frost Show, The Merv Griffin Show, The Mike Douglas Show, Late Night with David Letterman and the Late Show With David Letterman, Real Time With Bill Maher and The Daily Show and was a frequent guest on The Howard Stern Show. In later years he appeared on both MSNBC and Fox News Channel shows commenting on current events.

=== Film ===
Brenner portrayed a charity ball auctioneer in the 1989 romantic comedy Worth Winning (with Mark Harmon, Madeleine Stowe, and Lesley Ann Warren, who was also Brenner's co-star on Snip). He also starred in his own workout video, David Brenner's I Hate to Work Out Workout.

=== Radio ===
From 1994 to 1996, Brenner hosted a talk-radio program, inheriting the 3 p.m. to 6 p.m. timeslot of the daytime Larry King Show on the Mutual Broadcasting System. He had earlier hosted a syndicated weekly radio show, David Brenner Live, for three months in 1985. The Broadcast Pioneers of Philadelphia named Brenner their Person of the Year in 1984 and inducted him into their Hall of Fame in 2003.

== Personal life ==
Brenner had three children: Cole, Slade, and Wyatt. He and the mother of Cole, his first son, fought a custody battle for several years. Brenner finally won child custody in 1992. Because family courts would have regarded him as an absentee father if he were away from home more than 50 nights a year, Brenner substantially reduced the number of appearances in his stand-up comedy work, including performances on the Tonight Show, in order to secure and maintain custody of his son. Brenner married Elizabeth Slater of New York, the mother of his sons Slade and Wyatt, in the closing minutes of his David Brenner: Back with a Vengeance! HBO Special recorded in Las Vegas, on February 19, 2000. They divorced a little over a year later with Brenner claiming their first year of marriage was "the best year I had in my whole life ... I was the happiest man in the world" but then she grew "into this new person" and he didn't fit into her new lifestyle. They fought two custody battles, both of which Brenner won. Brenner was engaged to Tai Babilonia in 2005, but they never married. For a while in the 2000s, Brenner lived in Las Vegas.

== Death ==
Brenner died on March 15, 2014, at age 78, from pancreatic cancer at his Manhattan home.
