= Linda Hopkins =

American actress and singer (1924–2017)

- Born: Melinda Helen Matthews; December 14, 1924; New Orleans, Louisiana, U.S.
- Died: April 10, 2017 (aged 92) Milwaukee, Wisconsin, U.S.
- Genres: Blues
- Occupation: Singer
- Instrument: Vocals
- Years active: 1951–2017

Linda Hopkins (born Melinda Helen Matthews; December 14, 1924 – April 10, 2017) was an American actress and blues and gospel singer. She recorded classic, traditional, and urban blues, and performed R&B and soul, jazz, and show tunes.

== Biography ==
Hopkins was born in New Orleans, Louisiana, United States, the second child of the Reverend Fred Matthews, Sr. and Hazel Smith, Hopkins grew up in the section of New Orleans known by the locals as "Zion City". She went to school in "Gert Town" which bordered the Xavier University of Louisiana.

Known as "Lil Helen Matthews" as a child, she was discovered at the age of eleven by Mahalia Jackson when she persuaded Jackson to perform at a fundraiser at her home church, St. Mark's Baptist Church. Lil Helen opened the children's fundraising program with a rendition of Jackson's gospel hit, "God Shall Wipe Your Tears Away". Jackson was reportedly so impressed by Helen's determination and talent that she arranged for the young girl to join the Southern Harp Spiritual Singers in 1936. Hopkins remained with the group for a decade.

She first saw Bessie Smith perform Empty Bed Blues at The New Orleans Palace Theatre in 1936. Hopkins greatly admired Smith and later won critical plaudits for her rendition of Smith in the 1959 theatrical presentation Jazz Train. Matthews left New Orleans in the 1950s, and, in 1951, began performing at Slim Jenkins' Night Club in the Oakland/Richmond area. There she met Johnny Otis and Little Esther Phillips who created her stage name, Linda Hopkins. In 1952, Hopkins toured Hawaii and Japan for two years which included a stint with Louis Armstrong at The Brown Derby in Honolulu. She recorded for the Savoy, Crystalette, Forecast, Federal and Atco labels and often appeared at the Apollo Theatre in Harlem.

In 1960, Hopkins first toured Europe in the Broadway Express, the restaged production of Jazz Train. She recorded "Shake a Hand" with Jackie Wilson on the Brunswick label, which is her sole hit single reaching #21 on the US Billboard R&B chart. She also recorded "I Found Love" and "There's Nothing Like Love" with him on Brunswick in early 1962. She attended Stella Adler's Acting School in New York City.

During the 1970s, Hopkins performed in the Broadway musical, Purlie, and with Sammy Davis Jr. for nine months. In addition, she performed at President Jimmy Carter's 1977 inaugural ball. In 1972 she was awarded a Tony and Drama Desk Award for her performance in Inner City. She sang "Do You Believe" at the political event Star-Spangled Women for McGovern–Shriver, bringing 19,000 people to their feet.

Hopkins starred in Me and Bessie, a one-woman show paying homage to blues singer Bessie Smith, conceived and written by Hopkins and Will Holt. The world premiere was in Washington, D.C., in 1974. After a run in Los Angeles it transferred to the Ambassador Theatre on Broadway. The critically acclaimed show ran for thirteen months and 453 performances, and Hopkins was nominated for the Drama Desk Award for Unique Theatrical Experience.

In 1985, Black and Blue, written by Claudio Segovia and Hector Orezzoli, premiered in Paris at the Théâtre Musical Paris. The musical revue opened on Broadway in 1989 and ran for 829 performances. Hopkins received a Tony Award nomination for Best Performance by an Actress in a Musical. Wild Women Blues, conceived by Hopkins and produced by Mel Howard and created by Hopkins and William Lipscomb, premiered in Berlin in 1997. In 1998 Hopkins celebrated 50 years in show business.

In 2005, Motherin' The Blues: Linda Hopkins — The Continuing Legacy of The Blues Woman, researched and written by Erany Barrow-Pryor, Ph.D. through the Department of English at University of California, Los Angeles, was published.

In October 2005, Hopkins received a star on the Hollywood Walk of Fame.

Hopkins died in Milwaukee, Wisconsin, on April 10, 2017, at the age of 92.

== Discography ==
- Shake a Hand with Jackie Wilson (Brunswick, 1963)
- Linda Hopkins (RCA Victor, 1972)
- Me and Bessie (Columbia, 1976)
- How Blue Can You Get (Palo Alto, 1983)
- Here's the Kid: Live in Sesjun (Jazz Between the Dikes, 1994)
- Mel Howard Presents: Wild Women Blues (DRG, 1999)
- The Living Legend Live! (FreeHam, 2006)

== Filmography ==
- 2002: Cool Cat Theme Song with Derek Savage Productions
- 2003: Trolly the Trout Theme Song with Derek Savage Productions
- 2009: Linda Hopkins: Deep in the Night with Eddie Harris and Paul Smith
