= Pete Barbutti =

American comedian and musician

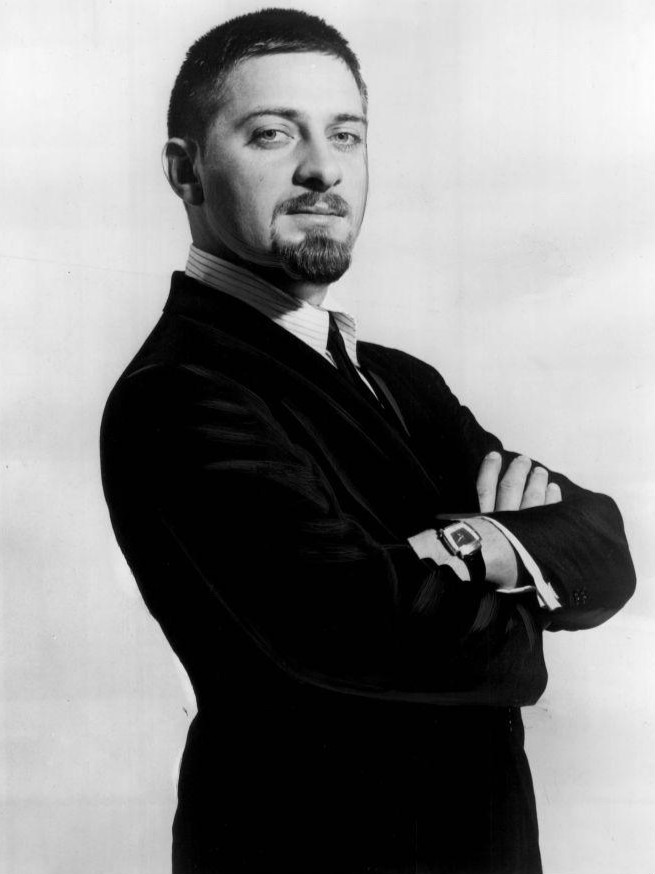
- Barbutti in 1966
- Born: Pete Rocco Barbuti; May 4, 1934 (age 92); Scranton, Pennsylvania, U.S.
- Other name: Pete Barbutti
- Occupations: Comedian, musician
- Years active: 1951-present
- Known for: Appearances on The Tonight Show
- Television: Pete's Place
- Musical career
- Genres: Polka
- Instruments: Accordion

Pete Barbutti (born Pete Rocco Barbuti, May 4, 1934) is an American comedian and musician. He made 38 appearances on The Tonight Show Starring Johnny Carson from 1971 through 1992. In 1983 he also hosted a short-lived variety show called Pete's Place. Originally starting in the entertainment industry as a polka accordionist as a teenager, he switched to comedy, but still used his musical talents in his comedy routines, such as the "cordeen teacher".

Barbutti has lived in Las Vegas since 1960; he currently performs as one-fourth of the comedy troupe "The Four Jokers", which is based in Nevada.

== Early life ==
Barbuti was born in Scranton, Pennsylvania. His mother, Mary Barbuti ( née Kating") was of Irish descent and worked as a cleaner. His father was a laborer. His grandfather, who was called Rocco (which is also Pete's middle name), emigrated to the US from Naples, Italy. He has two sisters.

Barbutti went to New York but soon relocated to Scranton. He was in his high school's marching band. During his early career, he took inspiration from vocal groups such as The Four Others, The Four Freshman, Four Jacks and a Jill, The Modernaires, and The Pied Pipers. He started teaching accordion in schools at age seventeen, teaching in two schools, one in Carbondale and one in Honesdale.

His first band was in high school called "The Polka Dots". Later in high school, he moved from one band to another, performing with "The Millionaires" and "Glass Hat"; the latter included Mike Wofford.

== Career ==
Barbutti is known for often incorporating his musicianship into his comedy routines. He plays piano, accordion, and trumpet. His surname is legally spelled "Barbuti" with only one "t", but for most of his career, he has spelled his surname with two "T"s. According to him in 2008:

It's legally spelled with one T. That's the way my family spelled it. When I started doing The Steve Allen Show in 1962, I think it was, the videographer who put the name across the bottom (of the screen) he spelled it with two T's. That wasn't visible on the monitor. So I never knew about it and I never saw the show because I was working at night when the shows played. I was in Seattle at the time. So it was like two or three months later. I had done the show a bunch of times. Two or three months later somebody noticed it and told me about it. When I told the agency I was with to correct it, they said it's too late; you better use the second T in there.

Among his better-known routines are "Cordeen School," about an accordion teacher who sells a lot of accordions, but whose students never seem to learn much; "The Mustang Ranch," about legalized prostitution in Nevada; and a number of piano-based gags (such as "tuning the piano stool" and using the business-end of a plumber's helper, stuck to the side of the piano as a cigar holder). Among his better known jokes is the story of the pig with the wooden leg.

His best known television works include "Celebrity Microwaves" as the host as well as The New Liars Club and The Next Line as a regular panelist. He performed on many talk show/variety shows in the late 1960s through 1980s, including The Alan Thicke Show, The Alan Hamel Show, The Mike Douglas Show, The Merv Griffin Show, The Joey Bishop Show, Dinah!, The John Davidson Show, and The Steve Allen Playhouse. In 1985, he guest starred on season 6 episode 17 "solid gold" of Benson playing Pete (a card dealer).

Barbutti became a recurring guest on The Tonight Show Starring Johnny Carson from 1971 to 1992, making 38 appearances. His first appearance on the show was on April 26, 1971 and his last was on March 12, 1992. Carson retired as host three months after Barbutti's last appearance. There was a six year gap between his debut and second performance on the show, 1971 and 1977; for the next decade from his second appearance onwards, he appeared on the show at least once every year for the next decade, being on the show the most in 1983 with eight appearances. After being on the show in 1987, he was not on the Tonight Show again until 1991.

Many editions of the Tonight Show with Johnny Carson made prior to May 1, 1972 are lost as a result of the tapes being junked and wiped. That includes Barbutti's debut appearance in 1971. In 1983, he hosted a short-lived variety show called Pete's Place. The show included guests such as Howie Mandel and John Candy.

Barbutti is still active in the industry, and is currently touring as a member of a comedy troupe called "The Four Jokers", that also includes Jay Johnson, Mark Schiff, and Scott Wood.

== Personal life ==
Barbutti married Mary Ann Barbuti in 1953, and moved to Las Vegas in 1960. They have three children. Barbutti still lives in Las Vegas as of 2024; he owns a small night club there.

== The Tonight Show appearances ==
1971

- April 26

1977

- December 19

1978

- February 9
- July 5
- October 30
- December 11

1979

- January 1
- November 13

1980

- January 7
- May 20
- December 1
- December 10

1981

- January 28
- March 26
- June 10
- November 3

1982

- January 8
- March 9
- June 3
- July 15
- August 23
- October 28
- November 29
- December 14

1983

- June 1
- June 17
- August 24
- November 3

1984

- February 7
- May 16
- October 3

1985

- January 15
- June 25
- November 19

1986

- October 2

1987

- May 20

1991

- October 2

1992

- March 12
