= Jim Fowler =

American zoologist and television host (1930–2019)

- Born: James Mark Fowler; April 9, 1930; Albany, Georgia, U.S.
- Died: May 8, 2019 (aged 89); Norwalk, Connecticut, U.S.
- Education: Earlham College
- Occupations: Zoologist, host
- Years active: 1963–2000
- Spouse: Betsey Fowler
- Children: 2

James Mark Fowler (April 9, 1930 – May 8, 2019) was an American professional zoologist and host of the acclaimed wildlife documentary television show Mutual of Omaha's Wild Kingdom.

== Early years ==
Born in Albany, Georgia, Fowler spent his youth in the town of Falls Church, Virginia, exploring all things in nature in the stream valley of Four Mile Run near his family home. He graduated from Westtown School in 1947, a Quaker college preparatory school in Chester County, Pennsylvania, and Earlham College in 1952.

== Career ==
Fowler first served as co-host of Wild Kingdom with Marlin Perkins, and became the main host in 1985 following Perkins' retirement. During this time he received four Emmy awards and an endorsement by the National PTA for family viewing.

Fowler was the official wildlife correspondent for NBC's The Today Show starting in 1988 and made forty appearances on The Tonight Show Starring Johnny Carson, bringing various wild animals on the show.

In 1997, Fowler joined Discovery Communication's Animal Planet channel as a wildlife expert and appeared as himself in the Seinfeld episode “The Merv Griffin Show”. Fowler later launched the television program Jim Fowler's Life in the Wild in 2000.

== Death ==
Fowler died on May 8, 2019, at the age of 89 at his home in Norwalk, Connecticut, from complications of heart disease. The Silvermine Fowler Preserve of the New Canaan Land Trust lies on the site of the former family home in New Canaan, Connecticut.

== Awards ==
- In 1991, Earlham College recognized Fowler for his distinguished career with an Outstanding Alumni Award.
- In 1995, the Global Communications for Conservation (GCC) organization presented Fowler with the 1995 Safari Planet Earth award for his "outstanding achievements in caring for our The National Council of State Garden Clubs, Inc., also awarded him with its highest achievement award, the Gold Seal, in recognition of his contributions to environmental causes.
- In 1998, the Environmental Media Association (EMA) presented Fowler with their first-ever Lifetime Achievement award in recognition of his strong support and on-going commitment to the environment.
- In 2003, Fowler was the recipient of the Lindbergh Award for his 40 years of dedication to wildlife preservation and education.

== Quotes ==
"The continued existence of wildlife and wilderness is important to the quality of life of humans. Our challenge for the future is that we realize we are very much a part of the Earth's ecosystem, and we must learn to respect and live according to the basic biological laws of nature." — Jim Fowler

"Almost all of the social tragedies occurring around the world today are caused by ignoring the basic biological laws of nature ... The quicker we humans learn that saving open space and wildlife is critical to our welfare and quality of life, maybe we'll start thinking of doing something about it." — Jim Fowler
