= Charlie Callas =

American actor, comedian and jazz drummer (1927–2011)

- Callas in 1966
- Born: Charles Callias; December 20, 1927; Brooklyn, New York, U.S.
- Died: January 27, 2011 (aged 83); Las Vegas, Nevada, U.S.
- Spouse: Evelyn Callas (1952–2010; her death)
- Children: 2

Comedy career
- Years active: 1950s–2011
- Genres: Stand-Up, Dark Comedy
- Subjects: Nervous Chattering, Rubber Face

Charlie Callas (born Charles Callias; December 20, 1927 – January 27, 2011) was an American actor and comedian. He was most commonly known for his work with Mel Brooks, Jerry Lewis, and Dean Martin, and his many stand-up appearances on television talk shows in the 1970s. He was also known for his role as Malcolm Argos, the restaurant owner and former con man, on the Eddie Albert and Robert Wagner television series Switch (1975–1978). Callas was also known as the voice of Elliott the Dragon in Disney's live-action/animated musical film Pete's Dragon (1977).

== Life and career ==
Callas was born on December 20, 1927, in Brooklyn, New York, as Charles Callias, the son of a Greek father and German mother. He served in the United States Army during World War II. He began his career as a drummer playing in groups with Bernie Cummins, Tommy Dorsey, Claude Thornhill, and Buddy Rich. He dropped a vowel from his legal name, Callias, when he took to the stage.

Callas was known for his facial expressions, trademark nervous chattering, and dark comedy. His first television appearance was in 1963 on The Hollywood Palace, and he soon was opening for Frank Sinatra in nightclubs around the country. In 1965 he played Lefty in a gambling parlor/laundry in The Munsters, season 2, episode 16, "Herman Picks a Winner." He made nearly 50 appearances on The Tonight Show Starring Johnny Carson. One of his best remembered routines was his account of two men -- "they're both nuts"—duck hunting with a shotgun. Callas repeatedly punctuated the simple conversation with strange, nervous sounds and nonsense syllables; "Fert, fert! WOW! Ga-digga-digga..." As the conversation became more frantic, Callas began flailing his arms, twitching his face, and writhing with extreme anxiety. By the end of the routine, Callas had worked himself into a frenzy. During certain extreme gyrations he would pause and ask the audience, "Did'ja ever see a guy tryin' to make a buck this way?"

Callas did the shotgun bit countless times on talk shows. He ran through the act on an episode of The Merv Griffin Show in 1965, and one of the guests, Jerry Lewis, practically fell off his chair in hysterics. Lewis turned to Griffin and said he had to use Callas in his current project. That one appearance on the Griffin show landed Callas a role in the 1967 Lewis film The Big Mouth. Lewis recalled the story on his short-lived 1984 talk show, in which Callas served as his sidekick and performed the shotgun routine.

He was a regular guest on The Dean Martin Celebrity Roast where he was called on to poke fun at celebrities, including Frank Sinatra and Don Rickles. Occasionally Callas showed up in an Army uniform, impersonating vaudeville comic George Jessel, much to the celebrities' amusement.

Callas had met and befriended Bobby Vinton in Las Vegas and when Vinton hit it big with a new TV show in 1975 Callas agreed to make a special appearance on The Bobby Vinton Show in October of that year. He also appeared on The Andy Williams Show at various times as "Captain Weird", a parody of superheroes. Callas's only known dramatic role was that of a restaurant owner, Malcolm Argos, in the 1970s show, Switch. He was also a regular performer on The ABC Comedy Hour in 1972. He was a semiregular on The Flip Wilson Show and co-host of The Joey Bishop Show. His last television appearances were on Larry The Cable Guy's Christmas Spectacular (2007) and Larry The Cable Guy's Star-Studded Christmas Extravaganza (2008).

== Death ==
On January 27, 2011, Callas died of natural causes, in his home in Las Vegas, Nevada. He was survived by his sons, Mark and Larry. His wife, Evelyn, had died six months earlier at the age of 80.

Tony Belmont, executive director of the National Comedy Hall of Fame in St. Petersburg, Florida, said of Callas upon his death: "There were two things he did that made his career. He could think very fast on his feet, and he had an unbelievable number of sounds that he made with his voice. He would tell a joke about two guys hunting. If you or I told it, the joke wasn't so funny. But Charlie made it hysterical by sticking in these sounds; so you would hear the gun cocking, the duck flying overhead, the explosion of the shotgun, and then the duck falling and screaming all the way to the ground."

== Filmography ==
- The Monkees (1966 TV Series) Season 1, Episode 6: “Success Story” - Ice Cream Man
- The Big Mouth (1967) — Rex
- The Wacky Weeki Wachee and Silver Springs Singing and Comedy Thing! (1973 TV Special) — Himself
- Switch (1975–1978, TV Series) — Malcolm Argos
- Silent Movie (1976) — Blind Man
- Pete's Dragon (1977) — Elliott the Dragon (voice)
- High Anxiety (1977) — Cocker Spaniel
- The Carpenters...Space Encounters (1978) — Himself
- Legends of the Superheroes (1979, TV Series) — Sinestro
- History of the World, Part I (1981) — Soothsayer - The Roman Empire
- Rooster (1982, TV Movie) — Francis A. Melville
- Hysterical (1983) — Count Dracula
- Gallavants (1984) — Azor (voice)
- The Dom DeLuise Show (1987, TV Series) — Charlie
- Amazon Women on the Moon (1987) — Himself
- Silk Stalkings (1993, TV Series) — El Cid
- Dracula: Dead and Loving It (1995) — Man in Straitjacket
- Vampire Vixens from Venus (1995) — Bartender
- Crooks (2002) — Sol solzberg
- Horrorween (2010) — Himself (final film role)
