= Argus Hamilton =

American screenwriter

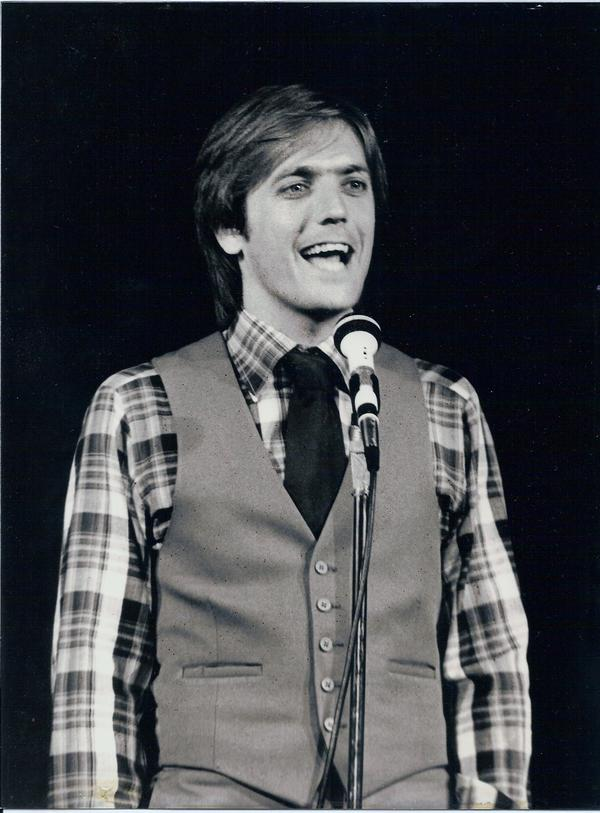
- Lord Argus Hamilton
- Born: Argus James Hamilton III; Poteau, Oklahoma, United States

Comedy career
- Years active: 1980–present
- Medium: Stand-up, television, writing
- Genres: Character comedy, observational comedy, wit, satire, political satire, black comedy, sarcasm
- Subjects: American culture, American English, everyday life, philosophy, human behavior, American politics, religion, psychology, pop culture, family
- Website: http://www.argushamilton.com/argus.htm

Argus Hamilton is an American stand-up comedian, writer, and host of The Comedy Store Tonight starring Argus Hamilton. Hamilton began his stand-up comedy career at The Comedy Store. His specialty was comments on the news of the day.

Robin Williams called him "the Will Rogers of the Baby Boom".

== Biography ==
The son of Dr. Argus James Hamilton, whose Hamilton ancestors arrived in South Carolina after losing the English Civil Wars, Hamilton is the son, grandson, and great-grandson of Methodist ministers, He has called his father “a wonderful man, a terrible golfer and a spellbinding preacher” and quotes him as saying “The church has seen a lot of changes over the last four hundred years, and the Hamiltons have been against every one of them.” Hamilton studied at the University of Oklahoma and started his career as a stand-up comedian in 1976.

In the summer of 1979, Hamilton was the first comedian to move into the iconic Cresthill house in Beverly Hills (the house where many comedians from the Comedy Store would crash), and lived there until 1982, when he went into rehab and Thomas F. Wilson took his room in Cresthill. During the 1980s, he struggled with addictions to drugs and alcohol.

Hamilton has made a number of appearances on The Tonight Show (some 15 or 20 appearances) and has written for television series such as The Richard Pryor Show and Laugh-In. Hamilton is also a syndicated comedy columnist. He is the host of The Comedy Store Tonight starring Argus Hamilton, a talk show introducing young comics from the Comedy Store.
