= Maureen Murphy (comedian) =

Australian comedian, actress, and celebrity

Maureen "Mauro" Murphy (20 January 1940 – 13 December 2018) was a British-born Australian comedian, actress, and celebrity who enjoyed some popularity in the United States during the 1980s, where she made several appearances on The Tonight Show Starring Johnny Carson. She also appeared on HBO, An Evening at the Improv and on Dom DeLuise's television show.

An article written at the time of her rise in popularity states Murphy was "born in England and raised in Rhodesia and Australia". Murphy was born to her parents Gladys Florence (née Norman) and John Murphy on 20 January 1940. She had a sister, Eileen Norma Murphy, with whom she formed an act known as the "Digeridoo sisters" upon arriving in Hollywood.

In later years she worked on a film project directed and written with her mother, Gladys Florence (1913-2013), eventually released in 2018 as Caravaggio and My Mother the Pope.

== Career ==
Murphy's early career started off in Australia where she would perform an act of bringing an audience member up on stage and doing a charcoal sketch of them. Though her act evolved upon her arrival to the states, she incorporated multiple forms of entertainments into her acts, such as the charcoal sketches, to the point where other performers would complain about the dust she left behind.

Throughout her career, Maureen Murphy performed under an extensive list of stage names. Murphy would often use different names for different acts. Most notably she did impressions under the names Daphne Davis, Cynthia Norman and Diana West. Murphy gained popularity and relative acclaim for her impressions as Daphne Davies, but decided to switch to standup because "there was no one left to do impressions of". Other stage names included Diane West, Cynthia Norman, and Slate Wilson.

A key factor in her success was her relation with Johnny Carson. After her first appearance, she was met with "shock waves of recognition" by the audience, and signed by the Carson Production Company. Her Carson canonization would solidify her role in the comedic sphere for the time, performing fourteen times and making the famed trip to the couch after her first. There were talks of her receiving her own show, but nothing came of it.

In the latter half of the 80's, Murphy would pursue minor roles in film and television and even dipped into writing and directing. She appeared in the movies Tall, Dark, and Handsome, as well as Return to Green Acres, with her most notable film acting credit in Roxanne. Her writing credits include the first episode of The Shape of Things, (1982) and she even went on to pursue directing in the film Caravaggio and My Mother the Pope, where she cast her own mother.

== Comedy ==
Murphy's style was "demure". She used her slightly outsider perspective as an Australian woman that became very anglicized to critique American culture through a feminist lens. Though her overall appearance was very buttoned up and proper, she would talk about such rambunctious topics such as the female libido. She grounded her humor in feminism, but did so in a non-offensive way. She appeared over fifteen times on The Merv Griffin Show.
