= Kelly Monteith =

American comedian (1942–2023)

- Born: Kelly Norton Monteith; October 17, 1942; St. Louis, Missouri, U.S.
- Died: January 1, 2023 (aged 80); Los Angeles, California, U.S.
- Occupations: Comedian, actor, writer, producer
- Years active: 1976–2020
- Television: The Kelly Monteith Show; Kelly Monteith
- Spouse: Caroline R. Alexander (divorced)
- Children: 2

Kelly Norton Monteith (October 17, 1942 – January 1, 2023) was an American comedian, actor, writer and producer. He was best known for writing and starring in the BBC comedy show Kelly Monteith.

== Early life ==
Kelly Norton Monteith was born in St. Louis, Missouri, on October 17, 1942.

== Career ==
During the early 1970s, Monteith performed as a guest comedian on various talk shows, including The Tonight Show Starring Johnny Carson, The Merv Griffin Show and The Mike Douglas Show.

In 1976, Monteith had a short-lived variety show on CBS, The Kelly Monteith Show. After successful guest appearances on British talk shows, he was offered his own series by the BBC. Montieth was given his break in the UK by Des O'Connor in 1977 on his show Des O'Connor Tonight and featured as regular guest comedian thereafter. Kelly Monteith was broadcast in 1979 and ran for six seasons. It was noted for often breaking the fourth wall by showing Monteith in his dressing room before and after a scene. Kelly Monteith won the Silver Rose for the BBC at the Montreux Television Festival in Switzerland during the series' run. In the United States the BBC series was rerun on the fledgling Arts and Entertainment Network.

In 1983, Monteith performed at the Royal Variety Performance, before a nation-wide tour.

From 2014 to 2020, Monteith co-hosted Brit Flix with Kelly, Paul and Two-Buck Chuck.

In 2015, Monteith and Paul Bland were awarded the National Arts and Entertainment Journalism Award for Best Television Anchor/Host by the Los Angeles Press Club.

From 2019 to 2020, Monteith worked again with The Anglophile Channel in Kelly Monteith's BBC Memories. The series looked back at Monteith's groundbreaking BBC series, Kelly Monteith.

== Personal life ==
Monteith resided in Los Angeles, California.

In February 2021, Monteith suffered two strokes that left him with aphasia. He was hospitalized for two months at Cedars-Sinai Medical Center.

On January 1, 2023, Monteith died at his home in Los Angeles, at the age of 80. His death was announced on January 2 in a social media statement by The Anglophile Channel, a LA-based production company he worked with in later years. He is survived by his two children with Caroline Alexander. Monteith's Kelly Monteith co-star Lisa Vanderpump led tributes on social media. Many comedians, including Bennett Arron, Al Murray and John Wing Jr. also paid tribute.

== Filmography ==
=== Film and television ===
| Year | Title | Notes |
|---|---|---|
| 1976 | The Kelly Monteith Show | |
| 1980 | No Holds Barred | Host |
| 1979–1982 | The Love Boat | 3 episodes |
| 1979–1984 | Kelly Monteith | 36 episodes |
| 1985 | Kelly Monteith in One | |
| 1985 | New Love, American Style | 1 episode |
| 1987 | Isabel's Honeymoon Hotel | 1 episode |
| 1988 | Screwball Hotel | Mr. Ebbel |
| 1990 | Hollywood Boulevard II | Zwing Zwiner |
| 1991 | Out of this World | 1 episode |
| 1991 | The Joe Longthorne Show | 4 episodes |
| 2004 | A Lousy 10 Grand | Ted |
| 2009 | Fuel | Scout |
| 2015 | Too Hip for the Room | Jake |
| 2019 | 64th Man | Podcast series; Old Michael |
| 2019 | The Real Geezers of Beverly Hills, Adjacent | 6 episodes |

=== As writer ===
| Year | Title | Notes |
|---|---|---|
| 1976 | The Kelly Monteith Show | 1 episode |
| 1980 | No Holds Barred | 1 episode |
| 1979–1984 | Kelly Monteith | 36 episodes |
| 1985 | Kelly Monteith in One | 2 episodes |
| 1990 | Out of this World | 1 episode |
| 2004 | A Lousy 10 Grand | |
| 2015 | Too Hip for the Room | Co-writer |
| 2019 | The Real Geezers of Beverly Hills, Adjacent | 6 episodes |
| 2019–2020 | Kelly Monteith's BBC Memories | 20 episodes |

=== As producer ===
| Year | Title | Notes |
|---|---|---|
| 2015 | Too Hip for the Room | |
| 2019 | The Real Geezers of Beverly Hills, Adjacent | 6 episodes |
| 2014–2020 | Brit Flix with Kelly, Paul and (Two Buck) Chuck | 23 episodes |
| 2019–2020 | Kelly Monteith's BBC Memories | 21 episodes |

== Discography ==
In 1984, Lettuce Be Cool, a non-music comedy album by Monteith was released in the United Kingdom by Chrysalis Records — CHR 1436. The album is available to purchase on Vinyl.
