= Canton of Évreux-Nord =

Coordinates: 49°01′28″N 1°09′04″E

The canton of Évreux-Nord is a former canton situated in the Eure département, France. It had 27,246 inhabitants (2012). It was disbanded following the French canton reorganisation which came into effect in March 2015. It included a part of Évreux and the communes of: Aviron, Bacquepuis, Bernienville, Le Boulay-Morin, Brosville, La Chapelle-du-Bois-des-Faulx, Dardez, Émalleville, Gauville-la-Campagne, Graveron-Sémerville, Gravigny, Irreville, Le Mesnil-Fuguet, Normanville, Parville, Quittebeuf, Reuilly, Sacquenville, Sainte-Colombe-la-Commanderie, Saint-Germain-des-Angles, Saint-Martin-la-Campagne, Le Tilleul-Lambert, Tournedos-Bois-Hubert and Tourneville.
