= Ryley (name) =

Ryley is a given name and a surname. Notable people with the name include:

== Surname ==
- Bryan Ryley, a Canadian artist and educator
- Charles Reuben Ryley (1752?–1798) an English painter
- George Urquhart Ryley (1853–1927), Land Commissioner of the Grand Truck Pacific Railway, known for giving his surname to the town Ryley in Alberta
- Henry Ryley (died 1586), English priest
- John Ryley (born 1961), British television producer and head of Sky News
- J. H. Ryley (c.1841–1922), an English singer and actor
- John Rutherford Ryley (1837-1884), Australian surgeon
- Kian Ryley (born 2005), English footballer
- Madeleine Lucette Ryley (1858-1934), English actress and playwright
- Samuel William Ryley (1759-1837), English actor and author
- Sarah Ryley (Born In Toledo, Ohio), American journalist
- Violet Ryley (1884–1949), Canadian dietitian
- William Ryley (c. 1610-1667), Officer of arms

== Given name ==
=== Female ===
- Ryley Bugay (born 1996), Filipino footballer
- Ryley Miller (born 1992), Canadian ice hockey player

=== Male ===
- Ryley Barnes (born 1993), Canadian volleyball player
- Ryley Batt (born 1989), Australian wheelchair rugby player
- Ryley Dunn (born 1985), Australian football player
- Ryley Jacks (born 1992), Canadian rugby player
- Ryley Kraft (born 1998), American soccer player
- Ryley Reynolds (born 2005), English football
- Ryley Sanders (born 2005), Australian rules footballer
- Ryley Smith (born 2003), Australian rugby league footballer
- Ryley Stoddart (born 1999), Australian football player
- Ryley Towler (born 2002), English footballer
- Ryley Walker (born 1989), American guitarist'

== Middle Name ==
- Colin Ryley Shepherd (1938-2024), British Conservative Party politician
- Courtney Ryley Cooper (1886-1940), American screenwriter
- Edward Ryley Langworthy (1797-1874), businessman and an independent but Whig-leaning politician
- George Ryley Scott (1886-1955), British author

== See also ==
- Riley (given name)
- Riley (disambiguation)
