= Reiley =

Surname

Reiley is a surname. Notable people with the surname include:

- Amy Reiley, American aphrodisiac foods authority and author
- Carol E. Reiley (born 1982), American business executive, computer scientist, and model
- John Reiley Guthrie (1921–2009), United States Army four-star general
- Mame Reiley (1952–2014), president of The Reiley Group, a consulting, fundraising and events communication agency
- Reiley McClendon (born 1990), American actor
- Robert J. Reiley, AIA, (1878–1961), American architect in New York City
- Sean Patrick Reiley (born 1976), American writer known for his comedy website
- Reiley (singer) (born 1997), Faroese singer, real name: Rani Petersen

== See also ==
- O'Reilly
- O'Riley
- Reilly (disambiguation)
- Reuilly (disambiguation)
- Riley (disambiguation)
