= Frank L. Anderson =

American animator, director, author, and musician

Frank L. Anderson (born January 19, 1957) is an American animator, director, author, and musician.

Anderson was born on Basilan Island and raised in Zamboanga City and Manila, the Philippines. At the age of 11, he moved to the town of Deerfield, Wisconsin with his family.

By the age of 17, he was a musician playing pedal steel guitar in bars and beer halls around Wisconsin. In 1978, Anderson moved to San Francisco and worked as a West Coast musician for country western performers such as Rose Maddox. As a session musician in the 1990s for producer Butch Vig's Smart Studios, he played accordion and pedal steel guitar on recordings for grunge and punk rock bands such as Killdozer (band) ("Twelve Point Buck", 1991) and Paw (band) (Dragline, 1994).

He has worked as a commercial Director/Animator since 1986. In 2006, he directed (with Barry Poltermann) the critically acclaimed feature film, The Life of Reilly, based on the life of comedian Charles Nelson Reilly. Anderson also scored and animated the film. The Life of Reilly was Rotten Tomatoes best-reviewed film of 2007.

== Filmography ==
- Aswang (1994) – Story
- The Life of Reilly (2007) – Director, Music, Animation

== Books ==
- Wicked Fox Cities: The Dark Side of the Valley. Charleston, South Carolina: The History Press, 2010.
