= Reily =

Reily may refer to:

== People ==
- Emmet Montgomery Reily (1866–1954), American politician
- Hugh Reily (c. 1630 – 1695), Irish Member of Parliament
- John Reily (1763–1850), soldier in the American Revolution and Ohio civil servant
- Kate Reily, British dressmaker, active in the late 19th- and early 20th-century
- Luther Reily (1794–1854), American politician
- Robert Reily (c. 1820 – 1863), American Civil War soldier, son of John Reily

== Places ==
- Reily Township, Butler County, Ohio, named for John Reily

== Other uses ==
- Reily Foods Company, American food and beverage company

== See also ==
- Riley (disambiguation)
- Reilly (disambiguation)
- O'Reilly (disambiguation)
