= Riley =

Riley may refer to:

== Businesses ==
- Riley (brand), British sporting goods brand founded in 1878
- Riley Motor, British motorcar and bicycle manufacturer 1890–1969
- Riley Technologies, American auto racing constructor and team, founded by Bob Riley in 2001
- Riley & Scott, former American racing constructor and racing team founded by Bob Riley and Mark Scott in 1990
- Riley & Son, a British railway locomotive engineering and refurbishment company

== People and fictional characters ==
- Riley (given name), including a list of people and fictional characters with the given name
- Riley (surname), including a list of people and fictional characters with the surname

== Places ==
=== United States ===
- Riley, Illinois
  - Riley Township, Illinois
- Riley, Indiana
  - Riley Township, Vigo County, Indiana
- Riley, Hancock County, Indiana
- Riley Township, Ringgold County, Iowa
- Riley County, Kansas
  - Riley, Kansas
- Riley Township, Clinton County, Michigan
- Riley Township, St. Clair County, Michigan
- Riley, New Mexico
- Riley, North Carolina
- Riley Township, Putnam County, Ohio
- Riley Township, Sandusky County, Ohio
- Riley, Oregon
- Riley, West Virginia
- Riley, Wisconsin, an unincorporated community

=== Elsewhere ===
- Riley Park, Vancouver, a neighborhood in Vancouver, British Columbia, Canada
- Riley Creek (Ontario), a tributary of the Black River in Central Ontario, Canada
- Riley (crater), on Venus

== Other uses ==
- Riley (film), a 2023 American drama
- Riley (horse) (1887–1910), an American racehorse

== See also ==
- Justice Riley (disambiguation)
- Life of Riley (disambiguation)
- O'Reilly (disambiguation)
- Riley Creek (disambiguation)
- Reilly (disambiguation)
- Ryley, a village in Alberta, Canada
- Ryley (name)
- Florida v. Riley, a US Supreme Court decision
- Riley v. California, 573 U.S. 373 (2014),[1] is a landmark United States Supreme Court
- Fort Riley, US Army post in northeast Kansas
  - Fort Riley (CDP), Kansas, a part of the post designated by the United States Census Bureau
- March 1–3, 2018 nor'easter, informally Winter Storm Riley
