= Riley Township, Michigan =

Riley Township may refer to the following places in the U.S. state of Michigan:

- Riley Township, Clinton County, Michigan
- Riley Township, St. Clair County, Michigan

== See also ==
- Riley Township (disambiguation)
