= Paul Linke =

American actor (born 1948)

- Born: May 6, 1948 (age 78); New York City, New York, U.S.
- Occupation: Actor
- Years active: 1970–present
- Spouses: Francesca Draper (m. 1978; died 1986) Christine Healy (m. 1991)
- Children: 4

Paul Linke (born May 6, 1948) is an American actor, known for his role as Officer Arthur "Artie" Grossman in the television series CHiPs. Linke has worked in film and extensively in television, mostly portraying mild-mannered everyman roles.

== Career ==
Linke was born in New York, New York, the son of Richard O. Linke, a personal manager, producer, and partner of Andy Griffith. After roles in films such as The Baby Maker (1970), Big Bad Mama (1974), The Strongest Man in the World (1975) and Moving Violation (1976), Linke appeared in the 1977 movie Grand Theft Auto. During the timeframe of his character on the television series CHiPs, Linke played a similar role as Sheriff Bruce Smith in the slasher film parody Motel Hell (1980). He also appeared in another Ron Howard-directed movie, the film Parenthood (1989). His other film credits have included roles in Space Rage (1985), LAFD Battalion Chief Powers in Fire, Trapped on the 37th Floor (1991), Shrunken Heads (1994) and K-PAX (2001).

His career has included appearances on many television series, including The Waltons, Laverne & Shirley, Happy Days, M*A*S*H, Knots Landing, St. Elsewhere, Quantum Leap and Lois & Clark: The New Adventures of Superman.

He appeared in a 1985 episode of Three's a Crowd, a short-lived television sitcom spinoff of Three's Company starring John Ritter. Three years later, Linke would work with Ritter again when he joined the cast of Hooperman, the ABC dramedy series that Ritter subsequently headlined. In 2003, Linke spoke at Ritter's memorial service.

In 2000 Linke co-wrote and directed the stage play "Save it for the Stage: The Life of Reilly" with actor Charles Nelson Reilly, which was later made into the 2006 film "The Life of Reilly".

Linke also appeared in the 2016 family-drama film An American Girl Story - Maryellen 1955: Extraordinary Christmas, playing the role of Maryellen Larkin's grandfather.

== Personal life ==
Linke met his first wife, Francesca "Chex" Draper, a musician and composer, at a party in Los Angeles in 1976. They married in 1978 and had three children together, Jasper, Ryan and Rose. When his wife died of cancer in 1986, Linke channeled his grief into writing and performing a play called Time Flies When You're Alive. First presented as a one-man show in Los Angeles and HBO drama, the work was then developed into the book Time Flies When You're Alive: A Real-Life Love Story. In 2016, he did a follow-up one-man show It's Time, continuing with the theme of tragedy, death and coping.

Linke later married Christine Healy in 1991. They have one child together, a daughter named Lily.
