= Hartford circus fire =

1944 mass fatality fire disaster in Hartford, Connecticut

- Tent on fire
- Date: July 6, 1944; 82 years ago
- Location: Hartford, Connecticut, U.S.; 41°47′41.9″N 72°40′28.0″W
- Cause: Unknown
- Deaths: 167+
- Injuries: 700+
- Accused: Robert Dale Segee (Note: Never formally charged, but accusations exist, and Segee once confessed to committing arson, but later recanted his confession.)
- Convicted: George W. Smith; Leonard S. Aylesworth; James A. Haley; Edward R. Versteeg; William Caley; David W. Blanchfield
- Verdict: Guilty (all later pardoned)
- Convictions: Involuntary manslaughter
- Sentence: Smith and Aylesworth: 2 to 7 years in prison Haley: 1 to 5 years in prison Versteeg and Caley: 1 year in jail Blanchfield: 6 months in jail
- Litigation: $5 million (Note: Equal to around $52.7 million in 2022.) given to victims' families in 1954 settlement

A circus fire occurred on July 6, 1944, in Hartford, Connecticut, killing at least 167 people and leaving more than 700 injured. It was one of the worst fire disasters in United States history. The fire broke out during an afternoon performance of the Ringling Bros. and Barnum & Bailey Circus that was attended by 6,000 to 8,000 people. It was the deadliest disaster ever recorded in Connecticut.

== Background ==
In mid-20th century United States, a typical circus traveled from town to town by train, performing under a huge canvas tent commonly called a "big top". The Ringling Brothers and Barnum & Bailey Circus was no exception, but stood out as the largest circus in the country.

The circus had been experiencing shortages of personnel and equipment as a result of the United States' involvement in World War II. Delays and malfunctions in the ordinarily smooth order of the circus had become commonplace. On August 4, 1942, while the circus was in Cleveland, Ohio, a fire had broken out in the menagerie, killing a number of animals. When the circus arrived in Hartford, Connecticut, on July 5, 1944, the trains were so late that one of the two shows scheduled for that day had been canceled. In circus superstition, missing a show is considered extremely bad luck, and although the July 5, 1944, evening show ran as planned, many circus employees may have been on their guard, half-expecting an emergency or catastrophe.

The next day was a Thursday; the crowd at the 2:15 afternoon performance was dominated by women and children. The size of the audience that day has never been established with certainty, but the best estimate is about 7,000.

=== Big top layout ===
The big top could seat 9,000 spectators around its three rings and measured 200 feet (61 m) wide by 450 feet (140 m) long. It had 15-foot-high (4.6 m) sidewalls and its roof was 48 feet (15 m) high. The tent's canvas had been coated with 1,800 pounds (820 kg) of paraffin wax dissolved in 6,000 US gallons (23,000 L) of gasoline, a common waterproofing method of the time; like all hydrocarbons, both substances are hydrophobic but also highly flammable. The big top had been erected over freshly mowed grass and exposed dirt that had been watered down and then covered with hay and wood shavings. Inside the tent there were three rings and two stages with a 25-foot-wide (7.6 m) oval shaped track separating the performance area and seating, which could be either bleacher or un-secured folding chairs. One could exit the tent by either a main entrance or eight other smaller exits; however, during the fire many of the alternative exits were blocked by circus wagons or other items.

== The fire ==
The fire began as a small flame after the lions performed, on the southwest sidewall of the tent, while The Flying Wallendas were performing. Circus bandleader Merle Evans was said to have been the first to spot the flames and immediately directed the band to play "The Stars and Stripes Forever" by John Philip Sousa, a march that traditionally signaled distress to all circus personnel. Ringmaster Fred Bradna urged the audience not to panic and to leave in an orderly fashion, but the fire had shorted out the power and he could not be heard. Bradna and the ushers unsuccessfully tried to maintain some order as the panicked crowd tried to flee the big top. The ushers also worked to attempt to douse the fire with water jugs that had been stationed in the big top and to pull down the canvas sections that were on fire; after realizing their attempts were futile they began to help evacuate the crowds.

The only animals in the big top at the time were the big cats trained by May Kovar and Joseph Walsh that had just finished performing when the fire started. The big cats were herded through the chutes leading from the performing cages to several cage wagons and were unharmed except for a few minor burns. Though most spectators were able to escape the fire, many people were caught up in the hysteria. Witnesses said some simply ran around in circles trying to find their loved ones rather than try to escape from the burning tent. Some escaped but ran back inside to look for family members. Others stayed in their seats until it was too late, assuming that the fire would be put out promptly. Because at least two of the exits were blocked by the chutes used to bring the show's big cats in and out of the tent, people trying to escape could not bypass them.

Aftermath of Hartford Circus Fire
- https://www.youtube.com/watch?v=zHlB8FLqR9Q

Survivor Maureen Krekian was 11 at the time of the fire and lived on the same road on which the circus was held. On the day of the event, she was supposed to go to the circus with a neighbor and her daughter. When she went to their house, she found that they had already left without her. She decided to go to the circus on her own, where she seated herself in the bleachers.

I remember somebody yelling and seeing a big ball of fire near the top of the tent. And this ball of fire just got bigger and bigger and bigger. By that time, everybody was panicking. The exit was blocked with the cages that the animals were brought in and out with. And there was a man taking kids and flinging them up and over that cage to get them out. I was sitting up in the bleachers and jumped down — I was three-quarters of the way up. You jump down and it was all straw underneath. There was a young man, a kid, and he had a pocketknife. And he slit the tent, took my arm and pulled me out.

As she was being pulled out, Krekian grabbed another little girl's arm and pulled her out as well. Frieda Pushnik, who performed with the circus as the "Armless and Legless Wonder", was rescued by a minstrel show performer who rushed on stage, picked up Pushnik's chair and carried her to safety. Pushnik continued to perform with the circus until 1955. Others, such as Judith Shapiro [Cohen], who was about seven years old, were taken higher up into the stands and instructed to jump off the bleachers. Being afraid to do so, Judith refused to jump and instead was pushed off, landing on a chair underneath.

Because of the highly flammable paraffin wax waterproofing of the tent, the flames spread rapidly, helped by the wind. Many people were badly burned by melting paraffin raining down from the roof. The fiery tent collapsed in about eight minutes according to eyewitness survivors, trapping hundreds of spectators beneath it. Because of a picture that appeared in several newspapers of sad tramp clown Emmett Kelly holding a water bucket, the event became known as "the day the clowns cried".

== Victims ==
While many people burned to death, others died as a result of the ensuing chaos. Sources and investigators differ on how many people were killed and injured. Various people and organizations say it was 167, 168, or 169 persons (the 168 figure is usually based on official tallies that included a collection of body parts that were listed as a "victim") with official treated injury estimates running over 700 people. The number of actual injuries is believed to be higher than those figures, since many people were seen that day heading home in shock without seeking treatment in the city. It is commonly believed that the number of fatalities is higher than the estimates given, due to poorly kept residency records in rural towns, and the fact that some smaller remains were never identified or claimed. Additionally, free tickets had been handed out that day to many people in and around the city, some of whom appeared to eyewitnesses and circus employees to be drifters who would never have been reported missing.

Some died from injuries sustained after leaping from the tops of the bleachers in hopes they could escape under the sides of the tent, though that method of escape ended up killing more than it saved. Others died after being trampled by other spectators, with some asphyxiating underneath the piles of people who fell over each other. Most of the dead were found in piles, some three bodies deep, at the most congested exits. A small number of people were found alive at the bottoms of these piles, protected by the bodies on top of them when the burning big top ultimately fell down.

Notable survivors included; Eunice Groark (first female lieutenant governor of Connecticut), The Flying Wallendas, Charles Nelson Reilly (actor, comedian, and director, who was thirteen at the time), actress Jan Miner, (best known for portraying "Madge the Manicurist" in advertising for Palmolive dishwashing detergent), drummer Hal Blaine and Emmett Kelly (renowned circus clown). Some who survived carried the trauma for decades. Seventy years after the fire, Carol Tillman Parrish, who was six at the time, said that "until this day, I can smell the stench of human flesh" as the blaze consumed its victims.

=== Little Miss 1565 ===
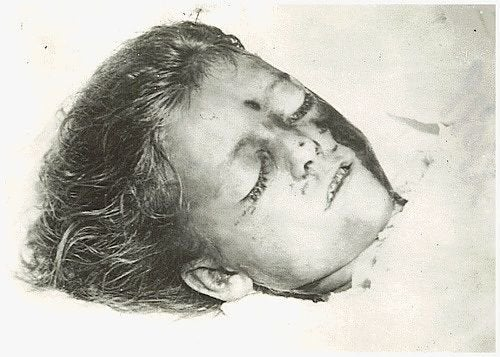
Connecticut State Police photo

The best-known victim of the circus fire was a young blond girl wearing a white dress. She is known only as "Little Miss 1565", named after the number assigned to her body at the city's makeshift morgue. Oddly well-preserved even after her death, her face has arguably become the most familiar image of the fire. Her true identity has been a topic of debate and frustration in the Hartford area since the fire occurred. She was buried without a name in Hartford's Northwood Cemetery, where a victims' memorial also stands. Two police investigators, Sgts. Thomas Barber and Edward Lowe, photographed her and took fingerprints, footprints, and dental charts. Despite massive publicity and repeated displays of the famous photograph in nationwide magazines, she was never claimed. Barber and Lowe spent the rest of their lives trying to identify her. They decorated her grave with flowers each Christmas, Memorial Day and July 4. After their deaths, a local flower company continued to decorate the grave.

==== Proposed identifications ====
In 1981, Lowe's widow announced that Lowe had identified the child and contacted her family, but they had requested no publicity. In 1987, someone left a note on the 1565 gravestone reading Sarah Graham is her Name! 7-6-38 DOB, 6 years, Twin. Notes on nearby gravestones indicated that her twin brother and other relatives were buried close by.

In 1991, arson investigator Rick Davey (along with co-writer Don Massey) published A Matter of Degree: The Hartford Circus Fire and Mystery of Little Miss 1565, in which he claims the girl was Eleanor Emily Cook and from Massachusetts. Davey also contends that there was a conspiracy within the judicial system to convict the Ringling defendants, and that Segee was the arsonist. Before writing the book, Davey spent six years researching the case and conducting his own experiments as to how the fire really may have started. He described the original investigation as both "flawed and primitive", though he did not work on the original case. Eleanor Cook's brother, Donald Cook, had contacted authorities in 1955, insisting that the girl was his sister, but nothing came of it, and Donald later worked with Davey to establish her identity. Donald believes that family members were shown the wrong body in the confusion at the morgue. In 1991, the body was declared to be that of 8-year-old Eleanor Emily Cook, though Cook's aunt and uncle had examined the body and it did not fit the description they provided. The Connecticut State Police forensics unit compared hair samples and determined they were probably from the same person. The body was exhumed in 1991 and buried next to her brother, Edward, who had also died in the fire.

==== Ongoing questions ====
Various assertions put forth in A Matter of Degree have been fiercely disputed by investigators who worked on the case, as well as by other writers, most notably Stewart O'Nan, who published The Circus Fire: A True Story of an American Tragedy in 2001. O'Nan points to the fact that Little Miss 1565 had blond hair while Eleanor Cook was a brunette. The shape of Little Miss 1565's face and that of Eleanor Cook are dissimilar, and the heights and ages of the two girls do not match. Perhaps most significantly, when shown a photograph of Little Miss 1565, Eleanor's mother Mildred Corintha Parsons Cook immediately stated that it was not that of her daughter. She firmly maintained that stance until her death in 1997, age 91. Badly injured in the fire, Mrs. Cook had been unable to claim her two dead children and was too emotionally traumatized to pursue it later. She had been told that Eleanor was not in any of the locations where bodies were kept for identification. She believed that Eleanor was one of two children who had been burned beyond recognition and remained unidentified. O'Nan thinks that Eleanor Cook may be body number 1503. He further points to the differences in the dental records of Eleanor Cook and the records made of Little Miss 1565 after her death.

As O'Nan and others have pointed out, the most likely scenario is that a family claiming a body early on mistakenly identified Eleanor Cook as their own child and that she is buried under that child's name. Even when Little Miss 1565's picture ran in the papers, the family failed to recognize her as their own because they wished to put the traumatic event behind them. While DNA analysis could end this debate definitively, the logistics of exhuming all of the likely candidates for this potential mix-up make such an undertaking unlikely.

With the true identity of Little Miss 1565 still unresolved for many, the body was exhumed after the release of A Matter of Degree and buried in Southampton, Massachusetts, next to the body of Edward Cook, the brother of Eleanor Cook and a victim of the circus fire himself. In 1992, her death certificate was officially changed from the previous identification of "1565". Since then, the Cook family has raised questions about whether the body is indeed that of Eleanor Cook, and some investigators have come to believe that Eleanor's body may have been among the fire's unclaimed bodies and was not that of Little Miss 1565.

== Investigations into possible causes ==
The cause of the fire remains unsolved. At the time, circus employees and three Hartford policemen who witnessed its origins reported it had apparently been started by an unknown man who had been smoking in the men's toilet, a canvas enclosure placed against the main tent, and who had thrown his cigarette against a sidewall, which then ignited; the flames had then spread to the highly flammable paraffin-coated roof. In 1969, detective Thomas Barber, one of the three officers, expressed his view the fire had originated with an individual attempting to extinguish a cigar or cigarette against the tent roof, where he had first seen the fire. In August 1993, following a two-year reexamination by the Connecticut State Police and its chief forensic scientist, Dr. Henry Lee, the cause was officially deemed "undetermined" and most likely accidental; based on his examination of burn damage and experimental results, Lee considered arson unlikely.

Others, however, suspected arson. In 1950, while being investigated on other arson charges, Robert Dale Segee (1929–1997), who was an adolescent at the time of the fire, confessed to starting the blaze. He was never tried for the crime and later recanted his confession.

=== Segee's confession ===
In 1950, Robert Dale Segee of Circleville, Ohio, claimed during a police interview that he was responsible for setting the fire. Following the interview, Segee signed a statement admitting to setting the circus fire, a series of other fires, and several murders since his youth. Segee, a 14-year-old roustabout for the show from June 30 to July 14, 1944, claimed that he had a nightmare in which an American Indian riding on a "flaming horse" told him to set fires. According to police authorities, Segee further stated that after this nightmare his mind went blank, and by the time it cleared the circus fire had been set. Some of Segee's hand-drawn images of his bizarre dreams, and images depicting his claimed murders, appeared in Life on July 17, 1950.

In November 1950, Segee was convicted in Ohio of unrelated arson charges and sentenced to 44 years of prison time. However, Hartford investigators raised doubts over his confession, as he had a history of mental illness and it could not be proven that he was in Connecticut when the fire occurred. Connecticut officials were also not allowed to question Segee, even though his alleged crime had occurred in their state. Segee, who died in 1997, denied setting the fire as late as 1994 during an interview. Because of this, many investigators, historians and victims believe that the true arsonist—if it had indeed been arson—was never found.

== Legal outcomes ==
On July 7, 1944, charges of involuntary manslaughter were filed against five officials and employees of Ringling Bros. Within the ensuing days, the circus reached an agreement with Hartford officials to accept full financial responsibility and pay whatever amount the city requested in damages. The circus paid almost $5,000,000 to the 600 victims and families who had filed claims against them by 1954. All circus profits from the time of the fire until then had been set aside to pay off these claims.

Although the circus accepted full responsibility for the financial damages, it did not accept responsibility for the disaster itself. The five men charged were brought to trial in late 1944, and four were convicted. Although the four were given prison terms, they were allowed to continue with the circus to its next stop, Sarasota, Florida, to help the company set itself up again after the disaster. Shortly after their convictions, they were pardoned entirely. One of the men, James A. Haley, went on to serve in the U.S. House of Representatives for 24 years.

== Aftermath ==
In 2002, the Hartford Circus Fire Memorial Foundation was established to erect a permanent memorial to the people killed in the fire. Ground was broken for the monument on July 6, 2004, at the site where the fire occurred.

Ringling Bros. and Barnum & Bailey visited Hartford during its final tour, putting on its final performance there on April 30, 2017.

== Depiction in media ==
- The Circus Fire: A True Story of an American Tragedy by Stewart O'Nan.
- Worlds Afire written by Paul B. Janeczko, a collection of poems in which victims, survivors, circus workers and rescuers give their various perspectives of the disaster and events preceding and following it.
- Masters of Illusion: A Novel of the Great Hartford Circus Fire by Mary-Ann Tirone Smith
- Silenced on Barbour Street, a dramatized play of the events of the fire by Ellington, Connecticut, drama teacher William Prenetta, based on interviews with the survivors and their descendants.
- July 6th, a song on Victory Gardens, the debut album by John & Mary, tells the story of the fire.
- Actor and theater director Charles Nelson Reilly, who was 13 years old at the time, survived the fire and dramatized it in the film of his stage show, The Life of Reilly. In a 1997 interview, Reilly said that he rarely attended the theater, despite being a director, as the sound of a large audience in a theater reminded him of the large crowd at the circus before the disaster. He also said during his latter show that his mother, whom he had disobeyed after she had told him not to go to the circus that day with his friend, caught them sneaking out of her sight and scolded them, saying "I hope it burns to the ground!"
- Black Raven and the Great Hartford Circus Fire. 1994 documentary by Heather Lyon Weaver. The documentary includes interviews with Robert Segee in Columbus, Ohio, research at the Connecticut State Library and The Hartford Courant. The Great Hartford Circus Fire includes archival footage and re-creations of events. Jonathan Selsley starred as Robert Segee in re-creations.
- Circus Fire by Janet Munsil is a one-act play inspired by the fire. It follows the story of 4 circus goers: An unattended, nonverbal little girl (Emily Cook, A.K.A Little Miss 1565), a soldier, a military mother whose husband is currently in the war, and her hyperactive son.

== Cited works and further reading ==
- Ahearn, James (May 9, 1990). "The Ghost of Fires Past". The Record. [Bergen County NJ]. p. B-7. (Eyewitness account.)
- Cohn, Henry S.; Bollier, David (1991). The Great Hartford Circus Fire: Creative Settlement of Mass Disasters. Yale University Press. ISBN 978-0-300-05012-7.
- Massey, Donald; Davey, Rick (2001). A Matter of Degree: The Hartford Circus Fire and Mystery of Little Miss 1565. Willow Brook Press. ISBN 978-1-930-60124-6.
- O'Nan, Stuart (2008). The Circus Fire: A True Story of an American Tragedy. Knopf Doubleday Publishing Group. ISBN 978-0-307-48298-3.
- Skidgell, Michael (2014). The Hartford Circus Fire: Tragedy Under the Big Top. The History Press. ISBN 978-1-625-84522-1.
