= Rileys =

British sports bar chain

- Industry: Hospitality, sports
- Founders: Edward James Riley
- Headquarters: Milton Keynes, England, United Kingdom
- Area served: United Kingdom
- Key people: Steve Hooper (General Manager)
- Parent: Valiant Sports
- Website: www.rileys.co.uk

Rileys is a British sports bar chain. Once a division of the Riley sporting goods company, it currently is an independent entity with headquarters in Milton Keynes, Buckinghamshire.
At its peak, the chain boasted 165 locations. Historically known as a pool hall operation, it went through several restructurings, with recent marketing efforts emphasizing the sports watching component.

In snooker, the chain has hosted a developmental tournament endorsed by Ronnie O'Sullivan, called Future Stars of Snooker. In darts, some locations hold amateur qualifiers for the UK Open, a Professional Darts Corporation tournament. Table tennis is another featured activity, with several locations registered with Table Tennis England's Ping! discovery programme.
