= Reuilly =

Reuilly may refer to the following communes in France:

- Reuilly, Eure, in the Eure département
- Reuilly, Indre, in the Indre département
- Reuilly-Sauvigny, in the Aisne département

See also

- 12th arrondissement of Paris - also known as "Arrondissement de Reuilly"
  - Reuilly - Diderot (Paris Metro), a station on the Paris Metro.
- Reuilly AOC, Wine
