= Life of Riley =

"The life of Riley" is an expression meaning a luxurious, carefree life.

Life of Riley may refer to:

== Art and entertainment ==
=== Music ===
==== Albums ====
- Life of Riley: The Lightning Seeds Collection, a 2003 compilation album by British band The Lightning Seeds
  - "The Life of Riley" (song), a single on the album, originally on the 1992 album Sense
- The Life of Riley (album), a 2011 album by Australian hip-hop artist Drapht
- The Life of Riley, a 1991 album by American band The A-Bones
- Life of Riley, a 2001 album by American musician Riley Baugus
- Life of Riley, a 2008 solo album by Dave Brewer, former member of the Australian band Dynamic Hepnotics

==== Songs ====
- "Life of Riley", a song on the 1989 album Instrument Landing by American guitarist Preston Reed
- "Life of Riley", a song on the 1991 album Worlds in Collision by American band Pere Ubu
- "Life O'Riley", a song on the 1989 album S&M Airlines by American punk rock band NOFX
- "Life of Riley", a song on the 2011 album The Stellas by Canadian duo The Stellas
- "Life of Riley", a 2014 song by Kevin MacLeod

==== Bands ====
- Life of Riley, a band headed by American musician Riley Smith

=== Stage and film ===
- The Life of Riley (1927 film), a 1927 American silent film directed by William Beaudine
- The Life of Riley (1949 film), an American comedy film
- Save It for the Stage: The Life of Reilly, a 2004 one-man show by Charles Nelson Reilly
- The Life of Reilly, a 2006 film based on the stage show by Charles Nelson Reilly
- Life of Riley (play), a 2010 play by Alan Ayckbourn
- Life of Riley, a 2011 pornographic film starring Stormy Daniels
- Life of Riley (2014 film), a 2014 French film of Ayckbourn's play, directed by Alain Resnais
- B.B. King: The Life of Riley, a 2012 documentary directed by English Jon Brewer

=== Broadcasting ===
- The Life of Riley, an American 1940s radio show, 1949 film, both starring William Bendix, a 1949 TV series starring Jackie Gleason and 1950s TV series starring William Bendix
- Life of Riley (British TV series), a 2009–2011 comedy series
- "Life of Riley", an episode of Birdz, an animated American-Canadian television series
- "Life of Riley", an episode of the American television series The Client List
- "The Life of Riley", a 1985 episode of the American television series The Fall Guy

=== Writing ===
- The Life of Riley, a 1937 novel by American writer Harvey Fergusson
- The Life of Riley, a 1964 novel by Irish writer Anthony Cronin
- The Life of Riley, a 1990 novel by Australian writer Jack Hibberd
- "Life of Reilly", a regular column in Sports Illustrated by Rick Reilly, 1997–2007

== Other ==
- Life of Riley, horse who won the 1999 Australian Hall Mark Stakes

== See also ==
- Riley (disambiguation)
