= Margaretta Riley =

British botanist (1804–1899)

Margaretta Riley (also known as Meta, née Hopper; May 4, 1804 – July 16, 1899), was an English botanist. She studied ferns cultivation and was the first British pteridologist of her sex. Riley presented to the Botanical Society of London "a complete dried collection of every species and variety of fern represented in the British flora".

== Life ==
Margaretta Riley, who was also known as Meta, was born in Castle Gate, Nottingham on 4 May 1804 to Richard and Margaretta Hopper. She married John Riley in 1826, agent for the Montague family in Papplewick, north of Nottingham, where she lived for the rest of her life.

Margaretta Riley and her husband worked together as pteridologists collecting, cultivating and studying ferns. They were both members of the Botanical Society of London − he from 1838, and she from 1839 on. In 1840 Riley presented to the society "a complete dried collection of every species and variety of fern represented in the British flora". The Riley's presented a number of papers to the society, and Riley herself presented one on growing and cultivating ferns from seed in 1840. She and her husband presented a 'comprehensive monograph' on ferns in 1840, but when a 29-page octavo presumably based on the monograph was published a year later, only John Riley was listed as author.

John Riley died suddenly on 14 December 1846, aged 50. Riley gave up her own pteridology on his death, but assisted other botanists in their work. The Riley's 2,200 sheet herbarium has not been traced, but the living fern collection of 250 species was passed to general practitioner James Forbes Young in Lambeth, after which its fate is untraced.

Riley wrote poetry, took up watercolour painting, and wrote magazine articles and a small book, The Duties of Woman.

Riley died of bronchitis at the age of 95 on 16 July 1899.

== Legacy ==
The crater Riley on the planet Venus was named after her.

== Works ==
Publications by Margaretta Riley include:

- On the British Genus Cystea (1839)
- On growing ferns from seed, with suggestions upon their cultivations and preparing the speciments (1839)
- Polypodium, Dryopteris and calcareum (1841)
