= Aswang (1994 film) =

- DVD cover artwork for the film
- Directed by: Wrye Martin; Barry Poltermann
- Written by: Frank L. Anderson; Wrye Martin; Barry Poltermann
- Produced by: Wrye Martin; Barry Poltermann
- Starring: Norman Moses; Tina Ona Paukstelis
- Cinematography: Jim Zabilla
- Edited by: Barry Poltermann
- Music by: Ken Brahmstedt
- Production company: Young American Films
- Distributed by: Mondo Macabro (USA, DVD)
- Release date: 1994
- Running time: 82 minutes
- Country: United States
- Language: English
- Budget: $110,000

Aswang, also called The Unearthing, is a 1994 American horror film directed and written by Wrye Martin and Barry Poltermann. It is based on the mythical creature that feeds on the unborn in Philippine folklore, with the screenplay written following a story telling session by Frank L. Anderson, who was a friend of the filmmakers. The movie was written by amateur directors Wyre Martin and Barry Poltermann and shot with a low budget, while actors were paid just $50 a day with the expectation they would receive a cut of any future profit. Many of the actors were cast from Milwaukee theater group Theatre X, most of whom had never acted in a film before.

To achieve some of its effects, the film utilized reverse motion as well as hiring an effects technician and a mechanical tongue, despite the limited budget. Some people had mixed opinions on the film, with some believing it was too slow to start while others felt the opposite, that it started well but were disappointed with the ending; critic Emanuel Levy considered it was "more gruesome and gross than really frightening". It was one of only 65 films selected to be shown at the Sundance Film Festival, to a mixed audience reception. Some people walked out part way through due to the use of blood and gore.

== Plot ==
Wealthy Peter Null, heir to his family's prosperous estate, is desperately in need of a child. An opportunity presents itself when he meets Katrina, a young and unmarried woman who is trapped with an unwanted pregnancy. Despite protestations from her boyfriend, Katrina meets Peter Null, who offers to pay her to bear the child; she agrees to sign over the rights for a large payment, in effect acting as a surrogate. In exchange for her payment, she must pose as his wife in order to convince Null's mother Olive, the family matriarch, that they are truly in love and that she is having his child, ostensibly to allow him to inherit his family's estate.

Heavily pregnant, Katrina is brought to the secluded estate deep within a menacing forest and is introduced to its residents; crippled Olive Null, mentally-ill reclusive sister Claire and their devoted Filipino maid Cupid, who Peter explains was once a midwife. Unbeknownst to Katrina, the residents are secret "Aswangs", vampires with mega-tongues that feed on living fetuses and they are planning to eat her unborn child. The Aswang kills and feeds via its endlessly long, flexible and strong tongue, nourishing on blood. It also has the ability to possess others.

An innocent but eccentric mushroom forager, Dr Harper, is caught trespassing on the property and senses early on that things may not be as they seem at the estate. He begins retrieving fetal corpses wrapped like cocoons from the estate grounds and realizes the Null family are actually sadistic vampires. Sensing his cover might be blown, Peter Null attacks Harper with his slimy tongue to disable him prior to wrapping him in a cocoon. Katrina then realizes the reality of the family's intentions and that her child's life is endangered. Katrina is then kept prisoner in the house with chains and drugs, preventing any possible escape. During a struggle, Peter Null, who by this time refers to the baby as his "property", senses Katrina's intentions to escape and knocks her over the head with an axe; while Katrina is temporarily disabled, he proceeds to feed on her blood. Upon awakening, Katrina uses the axe to cut off her hand in desperation and escapes the house, but is caught by Peter Null, briefly prior to Cupid appearing with the axe. Five years later, Cupid is seen with a young girl, implying that the child was born and became heir to the Null estate.

== Cast ==
- Tina Ona Paukstelis as Katrina
- Norman Moses as Peter Null
- Flora Coker as Olive Null
- Jamie Jacobs Anderson as Claire Null
- Mildred Nierras as Cupid the maid
- John Kishline as Dr Roger Harper
- Victor DeLorenzo as the Sheriff
- John Garekis as Lawyer
- Daniel Demarco as Paul
- Lee Worrell as Little Girl
- Rosalie Seifert as Nancy

== Production ==
=== Development ===
The film was based on a Filipino vampire legend and set in the northwoods of northern Wisconsin. Co-director Barry Poltermann had originally written another script and upon showing it to friend Frank L. Anderson, was advised they needed to "do something crazy that was going to break through and get attention", with Anderson believing that the script would amount to a "by-the-numbers" horror film. Anderson had grown up in the Philippines and told both Poltermann and co-director Wyre Martin a legend about a vampire "that would sit on rooftops and drop down its tiny thread-like tongue to suck out the blood of fetuses." Martin expressed that upon hearing about the legend, he was surprised that a film had not already been made about it. Poltermann believed the story was "totally screwed up", yet began brainstorming some ideas and had written a script within a week. When the script was read by Anderson, he thought it was "an interesting take on the myth" but it was not what he envisaged or expected having told the original story.

The limited budget of the film meant the cast and crew were unable to travel to the Philippines, so they instead opted to change the story to a family that grew up in the Philippines but moved to America.

Martin made his production debut with the film, which he believed was "such an arresting story" and provided the subtext they needed, as they did not want to do a "senseless, blood-letting slasher film." Co-director Poltermann noted there was a sense of "let's try this, let's try that" to determine what would work and would not and that it was deliberately shot in this manner, although he suggested that if he were to do another film he would "be more disciplined stylistically."

=== Filming ===
Filming took place during October and November 1992 at various locations around southeastern Wisconsin, including in Milwaukee, Lake Geneva, while some exterior shots were filmed along Wisconsin Highway 142 and Bong State Recreation Area in Kenosha County. Although the mansion in the film was supposed to be located in the countryside, it was actually in the middle of downtown Whitefish Bay. The cabin and estate were owned by the Buffett family, of whom Peter Buffett was a friend of the producers. The fight scene between Katrina and Claire was filmed in an abandoned house that was due to be demolished. The filmmakers had not found a suitable location just a week prior to shooting, as owners did not want their property to be destroyed, until Poltermann's brother suggested a house that was due to be burned down in a training exercise several weeks after the scene was filmed. The inclusion of a chainsaw in the scene was a last-minute decision by the directors.

According to Poltermann, the film, shot during the autumn with leaves decomposing, had a "secluded feel to it", making it look like it was "set in northern Wisconsin," despite being around 30 minutes away from Milwaukee. Filming was mostly outdoors, often starting at 8am each morning and would sometimes not finish until 11pm. Some scenes, according to Poltermann, were lifted from classic fright-flicks including The Shining and Rosemary's Baby, which he referred to as "visual sampling" in paying homage to great horror movies. A mechanical rubber tongue was created which was capable of complex movements, which required hiring an effects technician at a cost of $5,000, which used a large portion of the budget. However, it developed a cabling fault within the first few minutes of its first scene. With only one operational cable resulting in a one-sided limp tongue and limited to just small twitches, some scenes were adjusted to take in to account the limited operation. Scenes with the tongue were shot partially as reverse motion.

==== Budget ====
Despite trying to originally raise $125,000, the filmmakers were only able to raise $70,000. The filming budget did not exceed $70,000, while the remaining $40,000 to finish was made up from the filmmakers' personal finances. Actors received $75 a day for their participation, in anticipation of a greater sum once the film was released, a typically common arrangement for low-budget films employing inexperienced assistance.

=== Casting ===
The cast included university student Tina Ona Paukstelis and John Kishline, as well as Victor DeLorenzo, former drummer for rock group Violent Femmes. Paukstelis, who played Katrina, reflected on how fun, but exhausting it was to film, noting that she remembered "having to run around barefoot in a nightgown in November at night in the woods". She injured herself on several occasions but "handled it very well", according to co-star John Kishline. She auditioned for the role on the recommendation of her friend Joe DeLorenzo, who also was cast in the trailer. Paukstelis reflected on what was "a great experience" and judged the film as good, despite the five-week shooting schedule on a small budget. She felt one of the toughest challenges was trying to appear scared, as she considered that acting in front of a camera was more subtle than acting on stage. She was singled out by a critic as "a tough, independent heroine".

Poltermann described the casting of Norman Moses as Peter Null as interesting, as in his audition he redefined the character as one that would sing and dance, which writers did not envisage. Many of his character's elements were brought by the actor himself. The remaining members of the cast were from a Milwaukee theater group called Theater X. Although the characters were written as always being nude, this was changed in the film so that they would be clothed. Actors from Theater X were chosen particularly as they were locally available and known as risk-takers, alongside a view that being in a movie would be fun. John Kishline, a resident of Milwaukee and one of the founding members of the Theater X drama company, was cast as Dr Roger Harper. Kishline, who described the film as being "professionally done on a limited budget", spent most of his time on the film "ensnared from head to toe in a gooey cocoon".

== Post-production and release ==
Most of the cast and crew accepted deferred wage payments based on the eventual revenue the film would make. Although Martin and Poltermann planned for a direct-to-video release, they received numerous offers to run the film in theaters which would have put their movie on screens nationwide. The two producers had concerns about choosing an appropriate distributor, as they preferred choosing one who shared their vision of the film over how much revenue they could make from it.

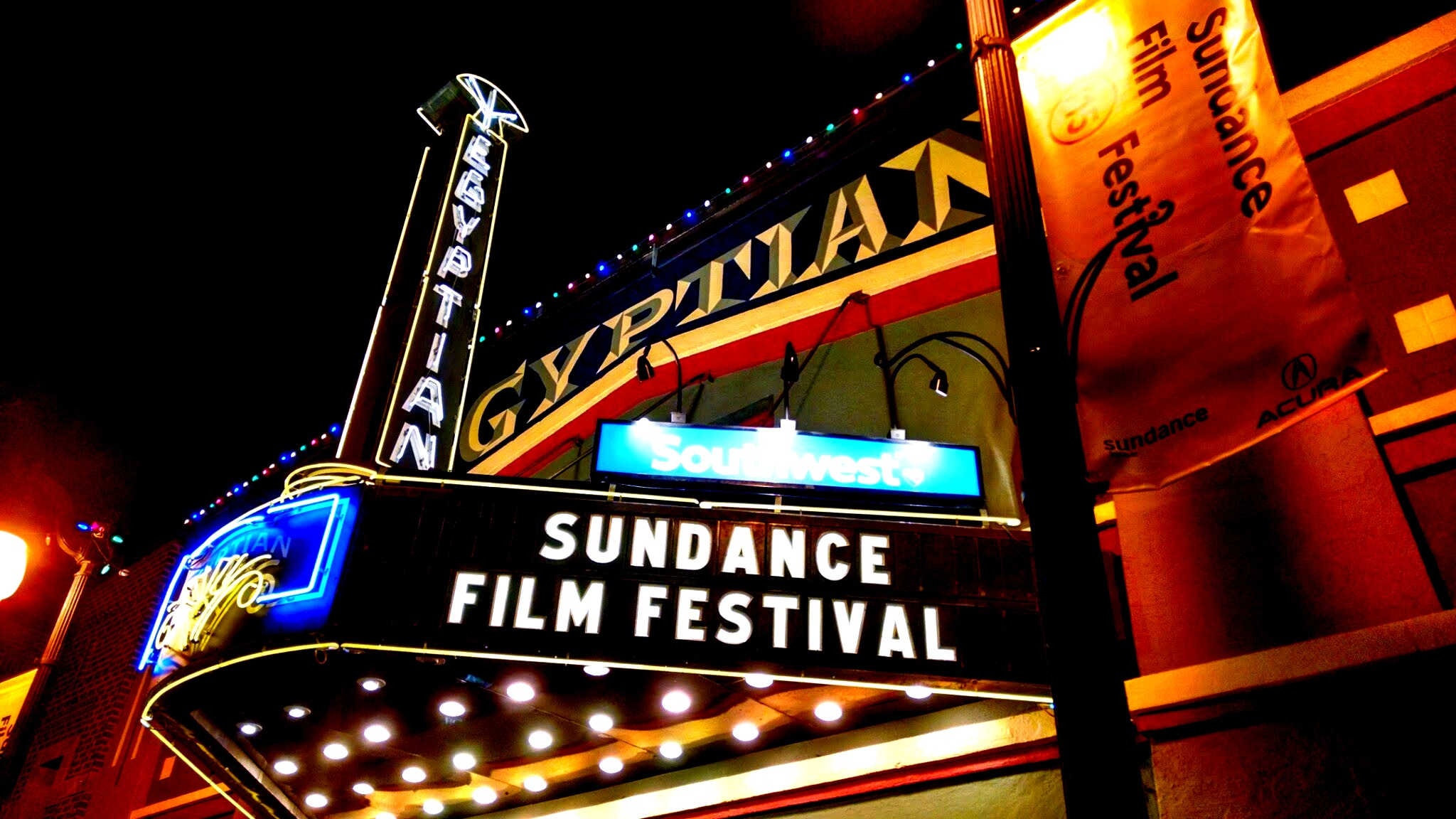
Sundance Film Festival sign

The film was made on a budget of around $110,000, although some sources say it was $150,000, which was expected to be made back from a video release. Profit was expected to come from overseas theatrical releases in countries such as Germany, Bulgaria and South Korea. Around 20,000 video units were produced with an expected sale price of $89 each, although Poltermann commented that he "wouldn't spend 89 dollars for it."

It was one of only 65 films selected to be shown at the Sundance Film Festival out of over 800 applicants and was regarded by The Daily Utah Chronicle as being "this year's most promising midnight attraction." On describing the film, Poltermann said "it was the idea that if you set out to make a cult film, you almost certainly won't", suggesting that they took an absurd premise and coupled it with equally absurd dialogue but played it out as straight and serious as was possible, noting that the film's humor comes from its absurdity. Poltermann considered the film "ridiculous and camp and over-the-top" and that both he and Martin did not take it too seriously as they wanted a film that was "ridiculous enough to be a form of escapism." It was given a rating of NC-17, adults only.

== Reception ==
Upon its original release reviews by mainstream critics were mixed. TV Guide wrote that "For much of its running time, 'The Unearthing' is a gripping and unsettling journey into fear. Towards the end, however, it abandons its aura of Cronenbergian repulsion, descends into camp, and blunts the impact of its memorably unpleasant build-up". According to director Poltermann, much criticism of the film was due to its uneven tone, with some people preferring the start but not the end, while others felt the start was "a drag until stuff starts happening a third of the way through." During its screening at the Sundance Film Festival, many audience members walked out "when the blood started flying."

Film Threat claimed that the uncut release was "completely loaded to the teeth with nerve-wracking suspense, an atmosphere of sheer dread, stomach turning gore and just a dash of black humor. Aswang is a very effective and nightmarish film that deserves far more attention than it has garnered over the past 11 years". The New York Daily News believed the film represented a rarity, noting that it succeeded in "capturing a legit nightmare quality and visceral intensity" and suggested that fans of fright films "would be well advised to snatch this obscure winner off the shelf." Film critic Steve Murray writing for The Atlanta Constitution regarded the film as "a horror flick that's not as outrageous as it wants to be", noting the film "does have its moments". Critic Emanuel Levy reviewed the film in Variety, noting that "the production lacks shrewd humor and visual style" and suggesting that it "is more gruesome and gross than really frightening".
