= O'Reilly (disambiguation) =

O'Reilly is a surname of Irish origin (the article includes a list of people and fictional characters with the surname).

O'Reilly may also refer to:

== Businesses and organisations ==
- O'Reilly Auto Parts, American automobile parts retailer
- O'Reilly Foundation, a personal charitable trust
- O'Reilly Media, American learning company

== Other uses ==
- O'Reilly (horse) (1993–2014), a New Zealand racehorse
- O'Reilly, Queensland, a place in Australia
- O'Reilly Open Source Convention, for the discussion of open source software

== See also ==
- Reily (disambiguation)
- Reilly (disambiguation)
- Riley (disambiguation)
- Lucas Oil Indianapolis Raceway Park, formerly O'Reilly Raceway Park
- The O'Reilly Factor, American political talk show
