= Riley Creek =

Riley Creek may refer to one of the following streams:

- Riley Creek (Ohio), a tributary of the Blanchard River in Ohio, United States
- Riley Creek (Ontario), a tributary of the Black River in Central Ontario, Canada
