= Normanville, Eure =

Normanville
- Commune
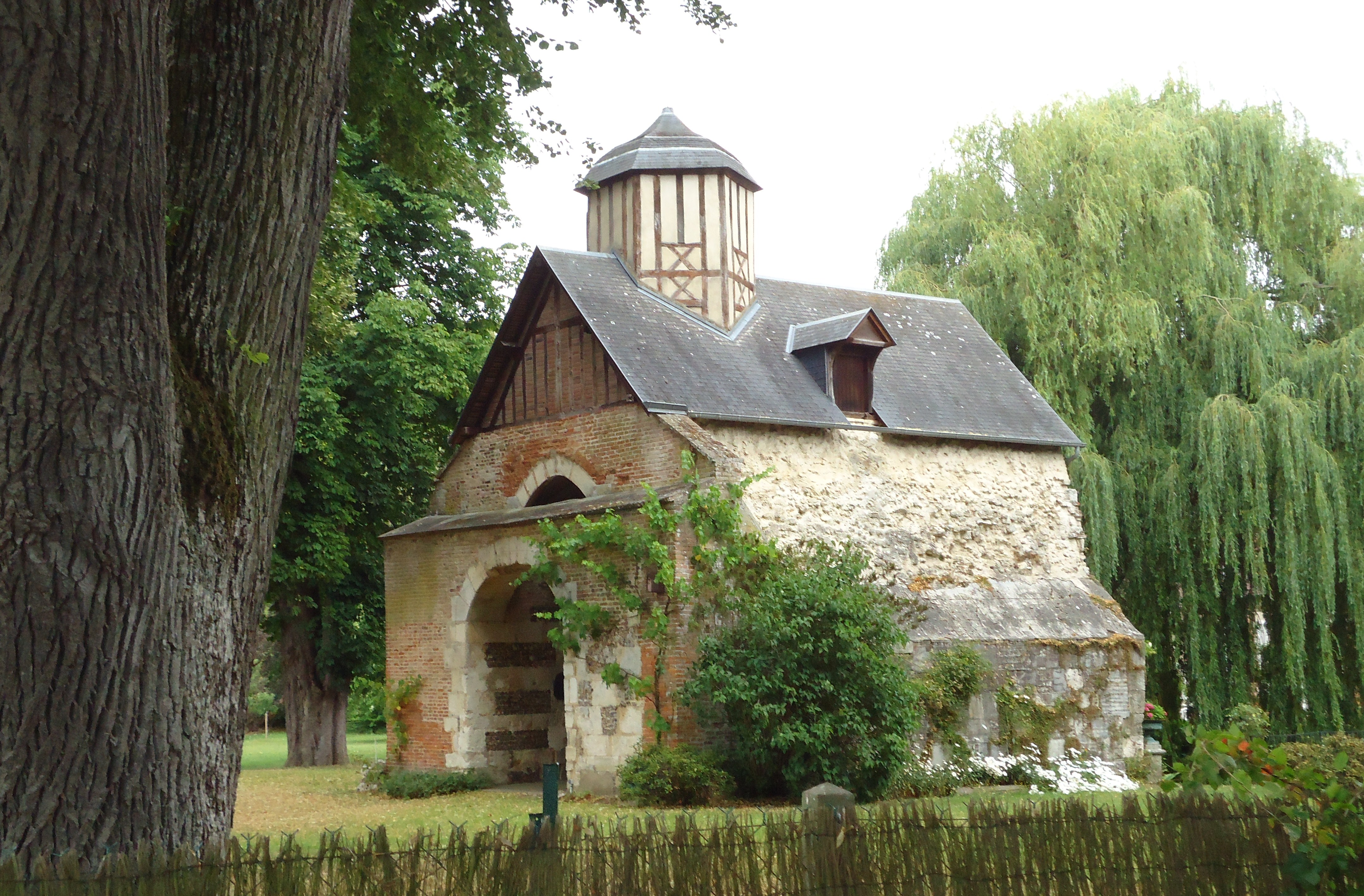
- An outbuilding of the old chateau
- Location of Normanville
- Location within France Location within Normandy
- Coordinates: 49°04′50″N 1°09′38″E
- Country: France
- Region: Normandy
- Department: Eure
- Arrondissement: Évreux
- Canton: Évreux-2
- Intercommunality: CA Évreux Portes de Normandie

Government
  - Mayor (2020–2026): Philippe Vivier
- Area^{1}: 9.14 km^{2} (3.53 sq mi)
- Elevation: 78 m (256 ft)
- Highest elevation: 142 m (466 ft)
- Lowest elevation: 42 m (138 ft)
- Population (2023): 1,176
  - Density: 129/km^{2} (333/sq mi)
- Time zone: UTC+01:00 (CET)
  - Summer (DST): UTC+02:00 (CEST)
- INSEE/Postal code: 27439 /27930
- ^{1} French Land Register data, which excludes lakes, ponds, glaciers > 1 km^{2} (0.386 sq mi or 247 acres) and river estuaries.

Normanville (French pronunciation: [nɔʁmɑ̃vil]) is a commune in the Eure department in Normandy in northern France.

== Population ==
Historical population
| Year | Pop. | ±% p.a. |
|---|---|---|
| 1968 | 305 | — |
| 1975 | 630 | +10.92% |
| 1982 | 790 | +3.29% |
| 1990 | 1,142 | +4.71% |
| 1999 | 1,255 | +1.05% |
| 2007 | 1,108 | −1.55% |
| 2012 | 1,078 | −0.55% |
| 2017 | 1,073 | −0.09% |
| 2023 | 1,176 | +1.54% |
Source: INSEE

== See also ==
- Communes of the Eure department
