= Gravigny =

- Commune
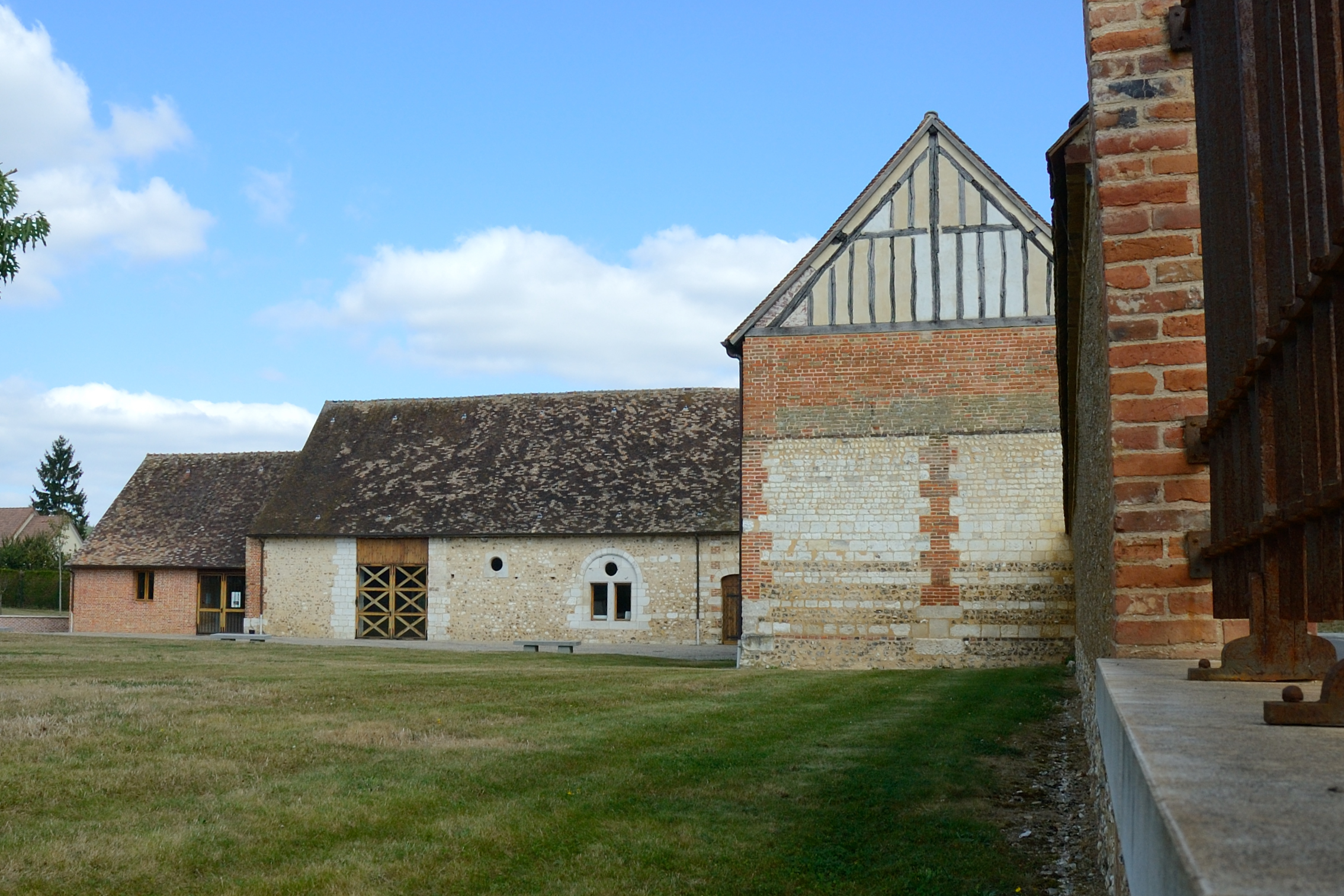
- The Maladrerie Saint-Nicolas
- Location of Gravigny
- Location within France Location within Normandy
- Coordinates: 49°02′54″N 1°09′52″E
- Country: France
- Region: Normandy
- Department: Eure
- Arrondissement: Évreux
- Canton: Évreux-2
- Intercommunality: CA Évreux Portes de Normandie

Government
  - Mayor (2020–2026): Didier Cretot
- Area^{1}: 9.98 km^{2} (3.85 sq mi)
- Elevation: 130 m (430 ft)
- Highest elevation: 138 m (453 ft)
- Lowest elevation: 51 m (167 ft)
- Population (2023): 4,012
  - Density: 402/km^{2} (1,040/sq mi)
- Time zone: UTC+01:00 (CET)
  - Summer (DST): UTC+02:00 (CEST)
- INSEE/Postal code: 27299 /27930
- ^{1} French Land Register data, which excludes lakes, ponds, glaciers > 1 km^{2} (0.386 sq mi or 247 acres) and river estuaries.

Gravigny (French pronunciation: [ɡʁaviɲi]) is a commune in the Eure department in northern France.

== Population ==
Historical population
Year	Pop.	±% p.a.
1968	2,437	—
1975	2,817	+2.09%
1982	2,540	−1.47%
1990	3,113	+2.58%
1999	3,598	+1.62%
2007	3,981	+1.27%
2012	4,034	+0.26%
2017	3,940	−0.47%
2023	4,012	+0.30%
Source: INSEE

== See also ==
- Communes of the Eure department
