= Violet Ryley =

Canadian dietitian

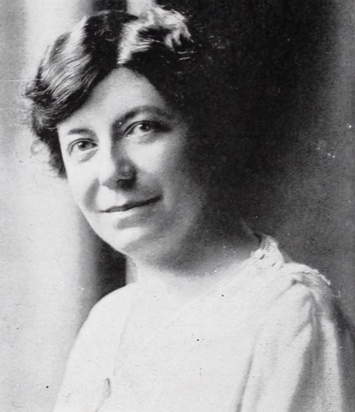
- Violet Ryley, from a 1919 publication
- Born: February 1, 1884; Bethany, Ontario, Canada
- Died: April 14, 1949 (age 65); Ontario, Canada
- Occupation: Dietitian

Violet Mildred Ryley (February 1, 1884 – April 14, 1949) was a Canadian dietitian, considered the "Dean of Canadian Dietitians" for her work during and after World War I.

== Early life and education ==
Ryley was born in Bethany, Ontario, the daughter of Thomas G. Ryley and Caroline Lee Ryley. She graduated in 1907 from the Lillian Massey School of Household Science in Toronto, and trained as a dietitian at New York City Hospital.

== Career ==
Ryley was a dietitian at Albany General Hospital for a year, and superintendent of the dining halls at the University of Toronto for nine years. After World War I, she spent four years as general organizer of dietitians for the Military Hospitals Commission. The success of her efforts ensured that dietitians would be appointed to forty military hospitals in Canada. "If the public once realized what a terribly monotonous diet, poorly cooked and wretchedly served, is given in many institutions, they would not tolerate conditions for a day, but would demand that conditions be improved," she said in 1921.

After her work with the military hospitals, Ryley became dietitian at the Toronto YWCA. She had charge of the kitchen at Eaton's Georgian Room, a Toronto restaurant, when it opened in 1924. She advised the Canadian military again during World War II. She was honorary president of the Canadian Dietetic Association and the Toronto Dietetic Association.

== Publications ==
- "The Work of the Dietitian in the Canadian Military Hospitals" (1918)

== Personal life ==
Ryley died from a heart attack in April 1949, at the age of 65. The Violet Ryley-Kathleen Jeffs Memorial Award, an annual honor bestowed by the Canadian Dietetic Association until 2023, was established in 1950 and named in her memory, and in the memory of her student and colleague, Kathleen Jeffs.
