= Émalleville =

- Commune
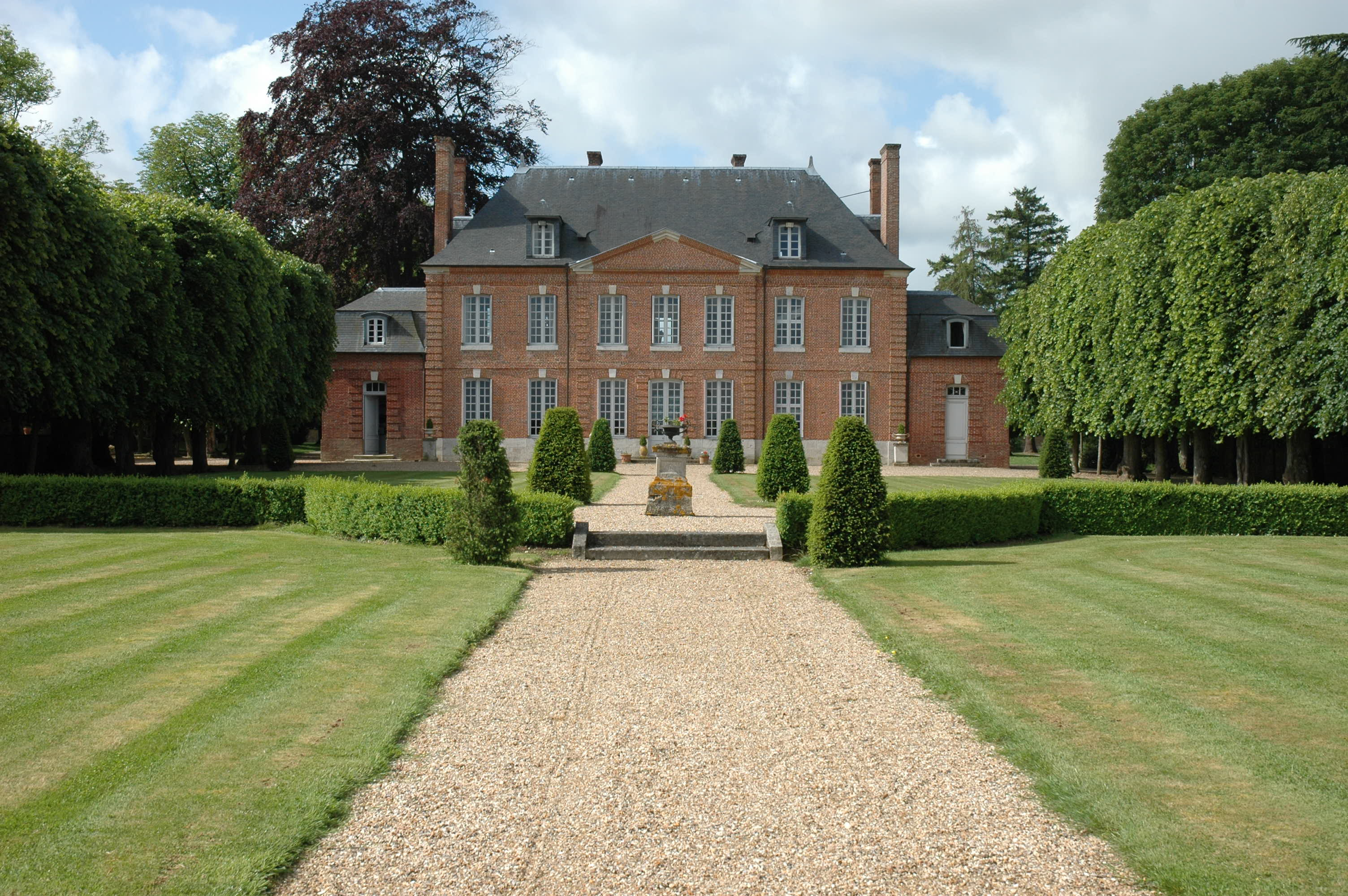
- The castle
- Location of Émalleville
- Location within France Location within Normandy
- Coordinates: 49°05′44″N 1°09′36″E
- Country: France
- Region: Normandy
- Department: Eure
- Arrondissement: Évreux
- Canton: Évreux-2
- Intercommunality: CA Évreux Portes de Normandie

Government
  - Mayor (2020–2026): Patrick Pattyn
- Area^{1}: 4.19 km^{2} (1.62 sq mi)
- Elevation: 135 m (443 ft)
- Highest elevation: 142 m (466 ft)
- Lowest elevation: 120 m (390 ft)
- Population (2023): 472
  - Density: 113/km^{2} (292/sq mi)
- Time zone: UTC+01:00 (CET)
  - Summer (DST): UTC+02:00 (CEST)
- INSEE/Postal code: 27216 /27930
- ^{1} French Land Register data, which excludes lakes, ponds, glaciers > 1 km^{2} (0.386 sq mi or 247 acres) and river estuaries.

Émalleville (French pronunciation: [emalvil]) is a commune in the Eure department in northern France.

== Population ==
The inhabitants are called Émallevillais.

Historical population
Year	Pop.	±% p.a.
1968	79	—
1975	142	+8.74%
1982	218	+6.32%
1990	396	+7.75%
1999	494	+2.49%
2007	538	+1.07%
2012	531	−0.26%
2017	522	−0.34%
2023	472	−1.66%
Source: INSEE

== See also ==
- Communes of the Eure department
