= Barry Poltermann =

American film editor, director, and producer

Barry Alan Poltermann (born January 12, 1964) is an American film editor, director, and producer.

Poltermann is known for editing the Sundance Grand Prize winning documentary American Movie (1999) and the HBO limited documentary series The Last Movie Stars (2022), which earned him a nomination for an American Cinema Editors Eddy Award. He also edited Jim & Andy: The Great Beyond (2017), which debuted at the Venice Film Festival and was nominated for an Emmy in 2018.

American Movie was named by The New York Times as one of the “1,000 Greatest Movies Ever Made” and the International Documentary Association named it as one of the top 20 documentaries of all time.

== Filmography (selected) ==
Year	Title	Role	Notes
1994	Aswang	Director, Editor	Sundance Film Festival
1999	American Movie	Editor	Winner, Sundance Grand Prize
2007	The Life of Reilly	Director, Editor	SXSW
2007	The Pool	Editor	Winner, Sundance Jury Prize
2009	Collapse	Editor	Toronto Film Festival
2015	Raiders!: The Story of the Greatest Fan Film Ever Made	Editor	SXSW
2017	Jim & Andy: The Great Beyond	Editor	Venice Biennale, Emmy Nominee
2019	I Am Not Alone	Editor	Toronto Film Festival
2020	Whirlybird	Story Supervisor	Sundance Film Festival
2022	The Last Movie Stars	Editor	Cannes Film Festival
2023	Wildcat	Editor	Telluride Film Festival
2025	Highway 99: A Double Album	Producer / Editor	Telluride Film Festival
2026	SCTV: The Greatest Show You've Never Heard Of	Editor	Netflix
