= Riley (crater) =

Crater on Venus

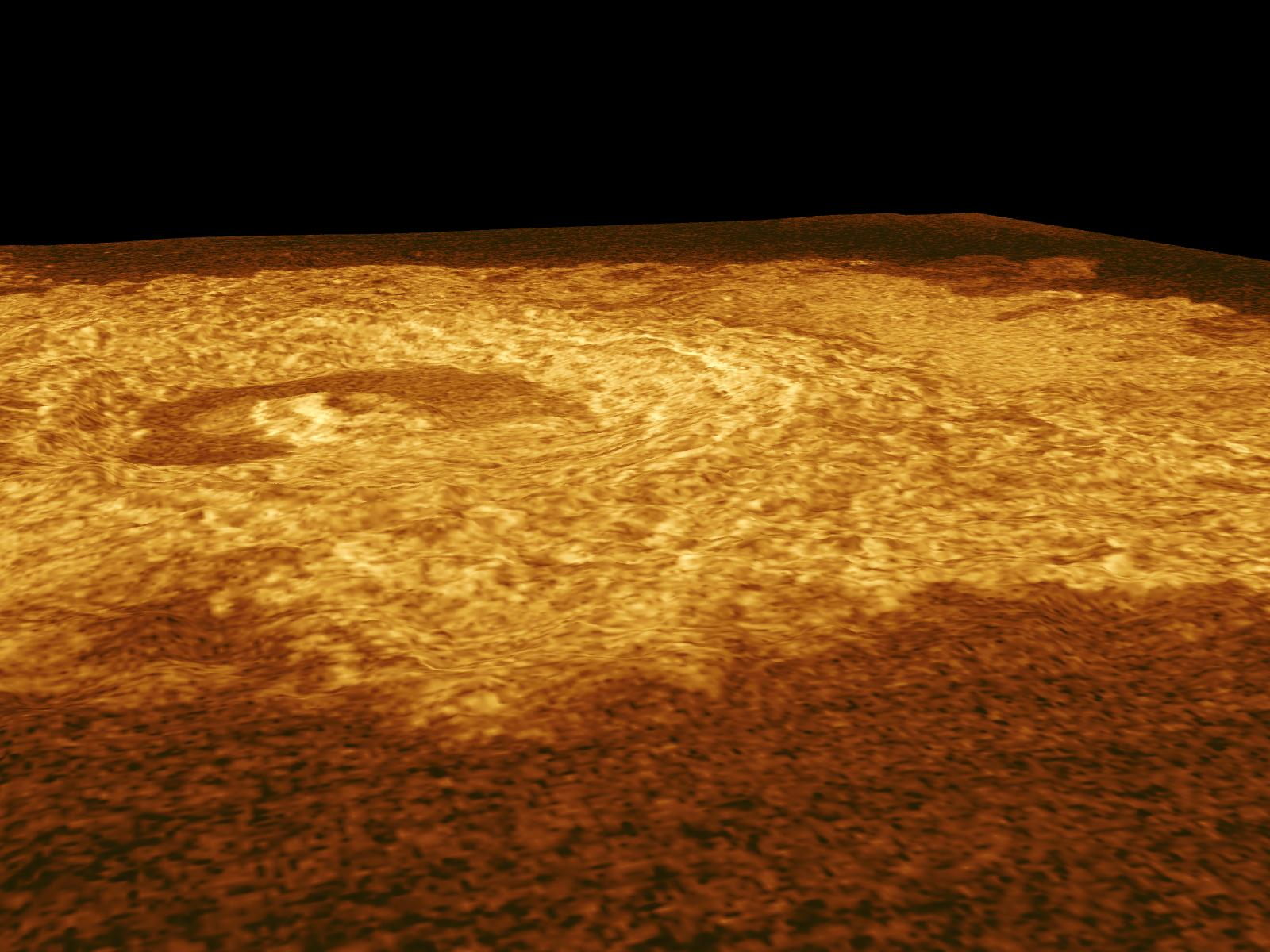
- Magellan radar image
- Location: Venus
- Coordinates: 14.1°N 72.5°E
- Diameter: 25 km
- Eponym: Margaretta Riley

Riley is a crater on Venus.

The crater is 25 kilometres (16 mi) in diameter. The floor of the crater is 580 metres (1,900 feet) below the plains surrounding the crater. The crater's rim rises 620 metres (2,030 feet) above the plains and 1,200 metres (3,900 feet) above the crater floor. The crater's central peak is 536 metres (1,759 feet) high. The crater's diameter is 40 times the depth resulting in a relatively shallow appearance.
