= Saint-Germain-des-Angles =

- Commune
- Location of Saint-Germain-des-Angles
- Location within France Location within Normandy
- Coordinates: 49°05′30″N 1°08′29″E
- Country: France
- Region: Normandy
- Department: Eure
- Arrondissement: Évreux
- Canton: Évreux-2
- Intercommunality: CA Évreux Portes de Normandie

Government
  - Mayor (2020–2026): Anne-Marie Lemarié
- Area^{1}: 1.81 km^{2} (0.70 sq mi)
- Elevation: 89 m (292 ft)
- Highest elevation: 139 m (456 ft)
- Lowest elevation: 42 m (138 ft)
- Population (2023): 172
  - Density: 95.0/km^{2} (246/sq mi)
- Time zone: UTC+01:00 (CET)
  - Summer (DST): UTC+02:00 (CEST)
- INSEE/Postal code: 27546 /27930
- ^{1} French Land Register data, which excludes lakes, ponds, glaciers > 1 km^{2} (0.386 sq mi or 247 acres) and river estuaries.

Saint-Germain-des-Angles (French pronunciation: [sɛ̃ ʒɛʁmɛ̃ de.z‿ɑ̃ɡl]) is a commune in the Eure department in Normandy in northern France.

== Population ==
Historical population
Year	Pop.	±% p.a.
1968	137	—
1975	148	+1.11%
1982	125	−2.38%
1990	205	+6.38%
1999	243	+1.91%
2007	219	−1.29%
2012	200	−1.80%
2017	173	−2.86%
2023	172	−0.10%
Source: INSEE

== See also ==
- Communes of the Eure department
