= Irreville =

- Commune
- Coat of arms
- Location of Irreville
- Location within France Location within Normandy
- Coordinates: 49°05′47″N 1°12′20″E
- Country: France
- Region: Normandy
- Department: Eure
- Arrondissement: Évreux
- Canton: Évreux-2
- Intercommunality: CA Évreux Portes de Normandie

Government
  - Mayor (2020–2026): Sophie Bocage
- Area^{1}: 5.6 km^{2} (2.2 sq mi)
- Elevation: 143 m (469 ft)
- Highest elevation: 146 m (479 ft)
- Lowest elevation: 45 m (148 ft)
- Population (2023): 474
  - Density: 85/km^{2} (220/sq mi)
- Time zone: UTC+01:00 (CET)
  - Summer (DST): UTC+02:00 (CEST)
- INSEE/Postal code: 27353 /27930
- ^{1} French Land Register data, which excludes lakes, ponds, glaciers > 1 km^{2} (0.386 sq mi or 247 acres) and river estuaries.

Irreville (French pronunciation: [iʁvil]) is a commune in the Eure department in northern France.

== Population ==
Historical population
Year	Pop.	±% p.a.
1968	159	—
1975	172	+1.13%
1982	162	−0.85%
1990	276	+6.89%
1999	337	+2.24%
2007	399	+2.13%
2012	466	+3.15%
2017	467	+0.04%
2023	474	+0.25%
Source: INSEE

== See also ==
- Communes of the Eure department
