= Dardez =

- Commune
- Coat of arms
- Location of Dardez
- Location within France Location within Normandy
- Coordinates: 49°05′00″N 1°12′34″E
- Country: France
- Region: Normandy
- Department: Eure
- Arrondissement: Évreux
- Canton: Évreux-2
- Intercommunality: CA Évreux Portes de Normandie

Government
  - Mayor (2020–2026): Raynal Marquais
- Area^{1}: 2.82 km^{2} (1.09 sq mi)
- Elevation: 145 m (476 ft)
- Highest elevation: 141 m (463 ft)
- Lowest elevation: 55 m (180 ft)
- Population (2023): 130
  - Density: 46/km^{2} (120/sq mi)
- Time zone: UTC+01:00 (CET)
  - Summer (DST): UTC+02:00 (CEST)
- INSEE/Postal code: 27200 /27930
- ^{1} French Land Register data, which excludes lakes, ponds, glaciers > 1 km^{2} (0.386 sq mi or 247 acres) and river estuaries.

Dardez (French pronunciation: [daʁde]) is a commune in the Eure department in northern France.

== Population ==
Historical population
Year	Pop.	±% p.a.
1968	41	—
1975	109	+14.99%
1982	119	+1.26%
1990	137	+1.78%
1999	168	+2.29%
2007	168	+0.00%
2012	163	−0.60%
2017	152	−1.39%
2023	130	−2.57%
Source: INSEE

== See also ==
- Communes of the Eure department
