= Samuel William Ryley =

English actor and author

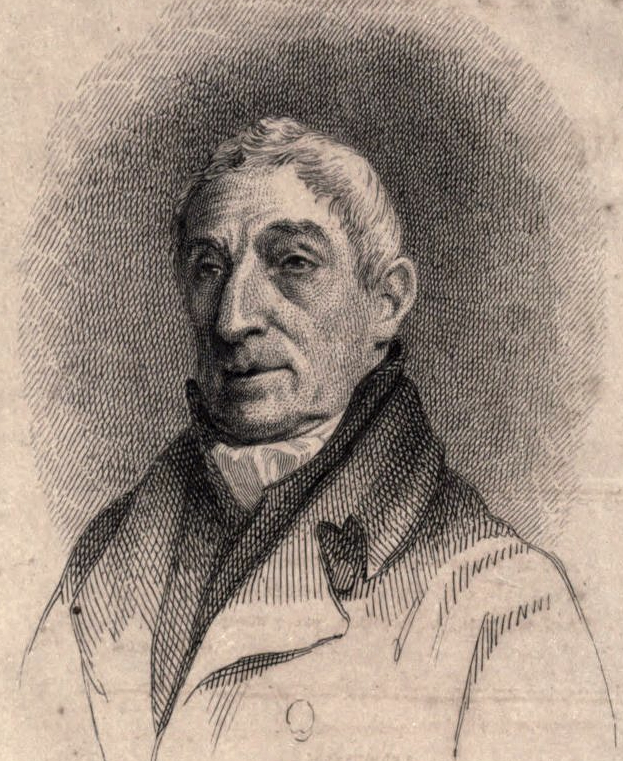
- By Edward Smith after Richard Bonington
- Born: 1759; London
- Died: 12 September 1837 (aged 77–78)
- Occupations: Actor and author

Samuel William Ryley (1759 – 12 September 1837) was an English actor and author.

== Biography ==
Ryley was the son and only child of Samuel Romney, a wholesale grocer of St. James's Market, London. He was born in London in 1759. After his retirement from affairs consequent upon ill-health, the elder Romney lived on an income of 350l. a year bequeathed to Mrs. Romney by her uncle, Sir William Heathcote, who also left 4,000l. to her children. Young Romney was educated at a day school in Kensington, and afterwards at a second in Fulham, kept by a Mr. Day. In his seventh year, he went with his parents to Chester, where he was placed at the grammar school. Bound apprentice to William Kenworthy of Quickwood, Saddleworth, Yorkshire, a woollen manufacturer, he ran away with his master's daughter Ann (baptised at St. George's Church, Mossley, on 9 December 1759), and married her at Gretna Green on 15 September 1776, remarrying her subsequently in Clifton, near Preston, where, after his mother's death, his father resided.

In five years the money he had inherited was spent, and he retired in April 1782 on a small income of his wife's to Newby Bridge, Westmoreland. In February 1783 he joined on sharing terms Austin & Whitlock's theatrical company at Newcastle-on-Tyne, where he appeared as George Barnwell in ‘The London Merchant.’ After losing about 20l. by the engagement, he retired to join Powell's company in the west of England, and in 1784, after raising 200l., joined Powell in management, beginning in Worcester. Soon buying out his partner with borrowed money, he became sole manager. The result was disastrous, and Romney, burdened with debt, had to resume his occupation of a strolling actor. At Taunton Mrs. Romney appeared as an actress. Among other parts she played Fanny to his Lord Ogleby in the ‘Clandestine Marriage.’ After rambling up and down principally in the west of England, Romney found his way to London, and tried unsuccessfully for an engagement at Drury Lane. As Lord Ogleby and Fanny the Romneys appeared in Manchester, where he gave to the stage some ballads which were favourably received, and produced in 1792 ‘The Civilian, or the Farmer turned Footman,’ a musical farce, Huddersfield, 12mo, no date. After an unsuccessful trip with a portion of the company to various country towns, he produced in 1793 at Manchester ‘Roderic Random,’ a comic opera taken from Smollett, Huddersfield, 12mo, no date. He then resigned the stage, in order ‘to commence tradesman in the spirit line.’ Upon the failure of this experiment he resumed a wandering life, with an entertainment written by himself, and called ‘New Brooms.’ With this he travelled in Yorkshire, where he gave it, under Tate Wilkinson's management, in Wales and in Cumberland.

He then joined the company of Francis Aickin at Liverpool, and afterwards that of Stephen Kemble at Newcastle-on-Tyne, and proceeded with the latter to Edinburgh. This must have been in 1797, since on 16 Jan. 1797, between the play and the farce ‘Mr. Ryley’ from Liverpool gave his popular entertainment, ‘New Brooms’ and ‘Lover's Quarrels.’ This is the first time we trace his use of the name of Ryley. After playing in Glasgow and other Scottish towns, he returned to Newcastle where, while playing Sir Francis Wronghead, he had a first attack of paralysis. A series of experiments followed with varying success. Possessed at one time of 350l., he was about to build a theatre at Warrington. Soon afterwards he was once more penniless.

The first three volumes of Ryley's ‘The Itinerant, or Memoirs of an Actor,’ dedicated to William Roscoe, were published in London in 1808. A second series, also in three volumes, and dedicated to Roscoe, with a portrait of the author, showing him an old man, appeared in 1816 and 1817, and a third series, once more in three volumes, and entitled ‘The Itinerant in Scotland,’ was issued in 1827. The last series is very scarce. The first series was reprinted in 1817. Another reprint in a large size was executed in 1880 at Oldham. ‘The Itinerant’ purports to be in some respects autobiographical. It is a wild, fantastic work, fashioned in part upon ‘Tristram Shandy,’ and in part upon Tate Wilkinson's ‘Memoirs of his own Life,’ and ‘Wandering Patentee.’

After forty years' residence in Chester and Parkgate, Ryley was arrested for debt and lodged in Chester Castle. From this durance he was relieved by a benefit got up for him at the theatre, and embarked on another career of unsuccessful management. The success of ‘The Itinerant’ induced him to turn his attention again to the drama, and he wrote two plays, respectively entitled ‘The old Soldier’ and ‘The Irish Girl.’ With these he came to London. Through his friend, Thomas Dibdin, the former was sent in to Harris of Covent Garden. Some delusive hopes were raised, but neither piece was accepted. Ryley was well received by Charles Mathews, at whose house he met Theodore Hook and various notabilities, and he strengthened his friendship with many celebrated actors, some of whom visited him at Parkgate; Mathews especially seems to have been a not unfrequent guest. The house at Parkgate, a diminutive edifice known as Ryley's Castle, was the deserted residence of the look-out custom-house officer. It is still in existence, commanding a beautiful view over the Dee.

On 13 February 1809, as Ryley from Liverpool, he made at Drury Lane, as Sir Peter Teazle, his first appearance in London. The ‘Monthly Mirror’ spoke of him contemptuously as ‘a thin gentleman about fifty,’ and said his delivery might make him respectable in the country. His hope of a three years' engagement was defeated in consequence, he holds, of the destruction of the theatre immediately afterwards by fire. Further essays in country management were no more prosperous than previous attempts, and his wife's money was at last all spent. Mrs. Ryley wrote a successful novel in three volumes, entitled ‘Fanny Fitz-York, or the Heiress of Tremorne’ (London, 1818, 3 vols. 12mo). She assisted her husband in a play, ‘The Castle of Glyndower,’ with which Ryley again went to London. Through the influence of Kean, it was produced at Drury Lane on 2 March 1818, with Mrs. Orger, Mrs. Alsop, Dowton, Harley, Knight, Penley, and Wallack in the cast. It was damned at the end of the second act, and never revived. A benefit was given Ryley for the purpose of enabling him to reach home.

Under the date 7 December 1819, Charles Mathews tells how ‘poor old Ryley, penniless and melancholy as usual,’ was ready for him on his arrival at Liverpool; Mathews adds that he gave a performance of two acts of ‘The Mail Coach,’ which old ‘Triste’ (‘Mundungus Triste’ in one of Mathews's entertainments was taken from Ryley) exhibited, the result being a profit of 100l. ‘so the Itinerant was in luck’ (Mrs. Mathews, Memoirs, iii. 105). The ‘Irish Girl’ was played for the first time for Ryley's benefit at the Theatre Royal, Liverpool, on 25 Feb. 1825, as Ryley said in the prologue, ‘to keep the wolf from the door.’ On this occasion Ryley played Sir John Trotley in Garrick's ‘Bon Ton, or High Life above Stairs.’ The ‘Irish Girl’ was occasionally revived, chiefly for Ryley's benefit, which became an annual affair. Ryley was accepted in Lancashire and Cheshire as Lord Ogleby, and Sir Peter Teazle, and played a great variety of characters. He founded in Liverpool debating societies, and started classes for instruction in elocution, deportment, and acting. The most popular of his entertainments consisted of a number of pasteboard figures worked by machinery, which made ridiculous faces while the showman played on the violin and sang a song of his own composition, with the chorus ‘Make faces.’ His chief faculty was for writing songs, which, with little literary quality and defective in rhyme and metre, hit off topics of the day. Some are included in a volume published at Huddersfield without date. He died, after a painful illness, on 12 September 1837, at his house in Parkgate, and was buried in the churchyard of Neston, Cheshire. His portrait appears in vol. iv. of ‘The Itinerant.’

The first Mrs. Ryley died on 27 March 1823, and Ryley married her nurse, who was also her niece. She survived him in extreme poverty.
