= La Chapelle-du-Bois-des-Faulx =

- Commune
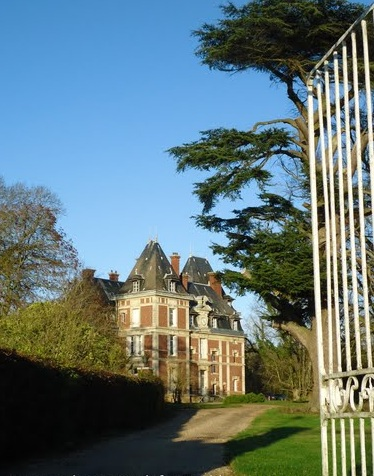
- Chateau de la Chapelle du bois

- Coat of arms
- Location of La Chapelle-du-Bois-des-Faulx
- Location within France Location within Normandy
- Coordinates: 49°06′37″N 1°10′06″E
- Country: France
- Region: Normandy
- Department: Eure
- Arrondissement: Évreux
- Canton: Évreux-2
- Intercommunality: CA Évreux Portes de Normandie

Government
  - Mayor (2020–2026): Christian Ronné
- Area^{1}: 4 km^{2} (1.5 sq mi)
- Elevation: 130 m (430 ft)
- Population (2023): 637
  - Density: 160/km^{2} (410/sq mi)
- Time zone: UTC+01:00 (CET)
  - Summer (DST): UTC+02:00 (CEST)
- INSEE/Postal code: 27147 /27930
- ^{1} French Land Register data, which excludes lakes, ponds, glaciers > 1 km^{2} (0.386 sq mi or 247 acres) and river estuaries.

La Chapelle-du-Bois-des-Faulx (French pronunciation: [la ʃapɛl dy bwa de fo]) is a commune in the Eure department in northern France.

== Population ==
Historical population
Year	Pop.	±% p.a.
1968	143	—
1975	213	+5.86%
1982	355	+7.57%
1990	410	+1.82%
1999	460	+1.29%
2007	476	+0.43%
2012	543	+2.67%
2017	653	+3.76%
2023	637	−0.41%
Source: INSEE

== See also ==
- Communes of the Eure department
