= Riley, West Virginia =

Riley
- Unincorporated community
- Location within the state of West Virginia Riley (the United States)
- Coordinates: 37°48′55″N 81°9′39″W
- Country: United States
- State: West Virginia
- County: Raleigh
- Elevation: 2,356 ft (718 m)
- Time zone: UTC-5 (Eastern (EST))
  - Summer (DST): UTC-4 (EDT)
- GNIS ID: 1742927

Riley was an unincorporated community in Raleigh County, West Virginia, United States. Its post office no longer exists.
