= Le Tilleul-Lambert =

- Commune
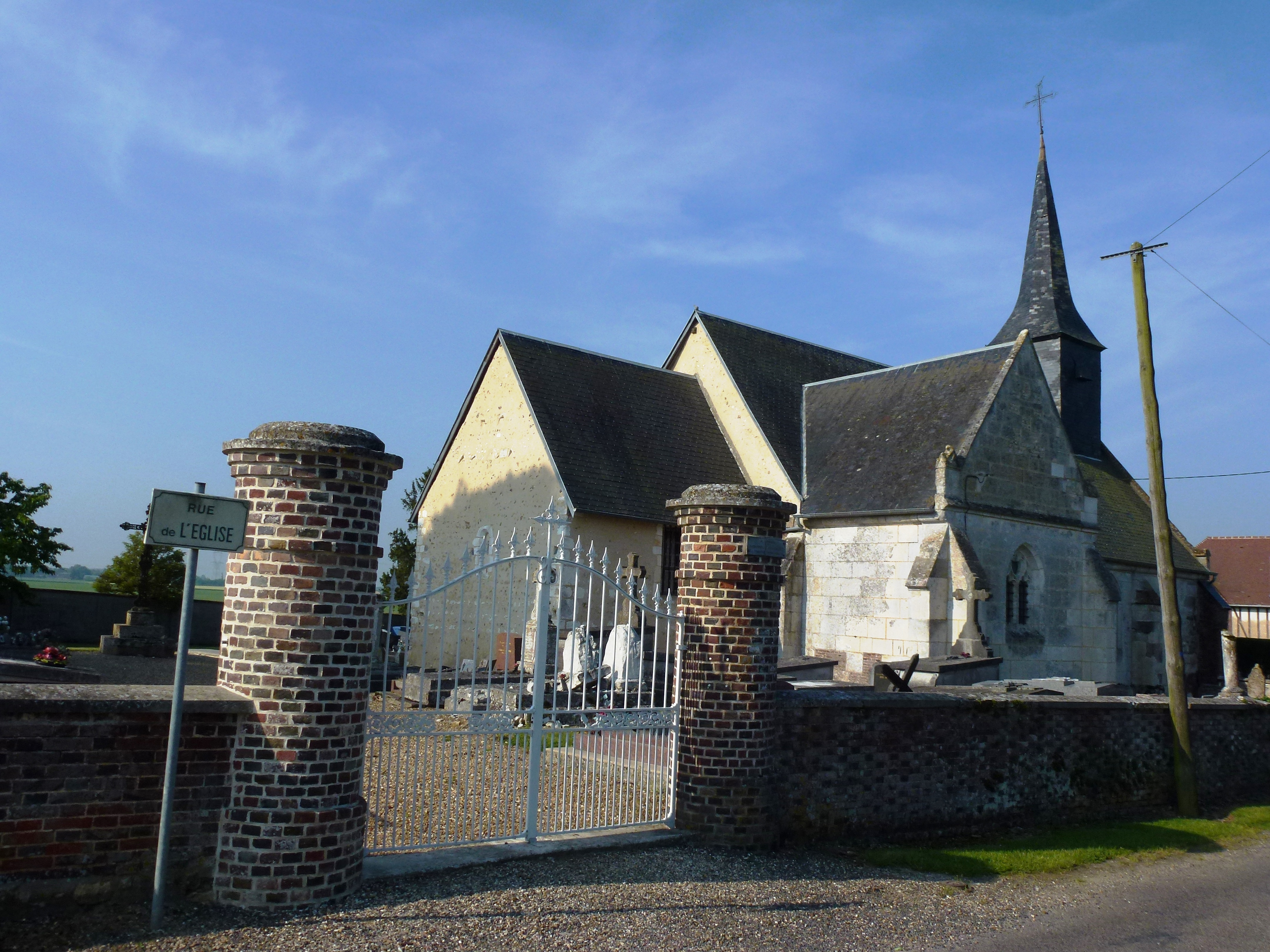
- The church in Le Tilleul-Lambert
- Location of Le Tilleul-Lambert
- Location within France Location within Normandy
- Coordinates: 49°05′15″N 0°56′29″E
- Country: France
- Region: Normandy
- Department: Eure
- Arrondissement: Bernay
- Canton: Le Neubourg

Government
  - Mayor (2020–2026): Jean-François Gavard-Gongallud
- Area^{1}: 5.83 km^{2} (2.25 sq mi)
- Elevation: 143 m (469 ft)
- Highest elevation: 154 m (505 ft)
- Lowest elevation: 133 m (436 ft)
- Population (2023): 267
  - Density: 45.8/km^{2} (119/sq mi)
- Time zone: UTC+01:00 (CET)
  - Summer (DST): UTC+02:00 (CEST)
- INSEE/Postal code: 27641 /27110
- ^{1} French Land Register data, which excludes lakes, ponds, glaciers > 1 km^{2} (0.386 sq mi or 247 acres) and river estuaries.

Le Tilleul-Lambert (French pronunciation: [lə tijœl lɑ̃bɛʁ]) is a commune in the Eure department in Normandy in northern France.

== Population ==
Historical population
Year	Pop.	±% p.a.
1968	119	—
1975	118	−0.12%
1982	152	+3.68%
1990	149	−0.25%
1999	148	−0.07%
2007	181	+2.55%
2012	225	+4.45%
2017	251	+2.21%
2023	267	+1.04%
Source: INSEE

== See also ==
- Communes of the Eure department
