= Brosville =

- Commune
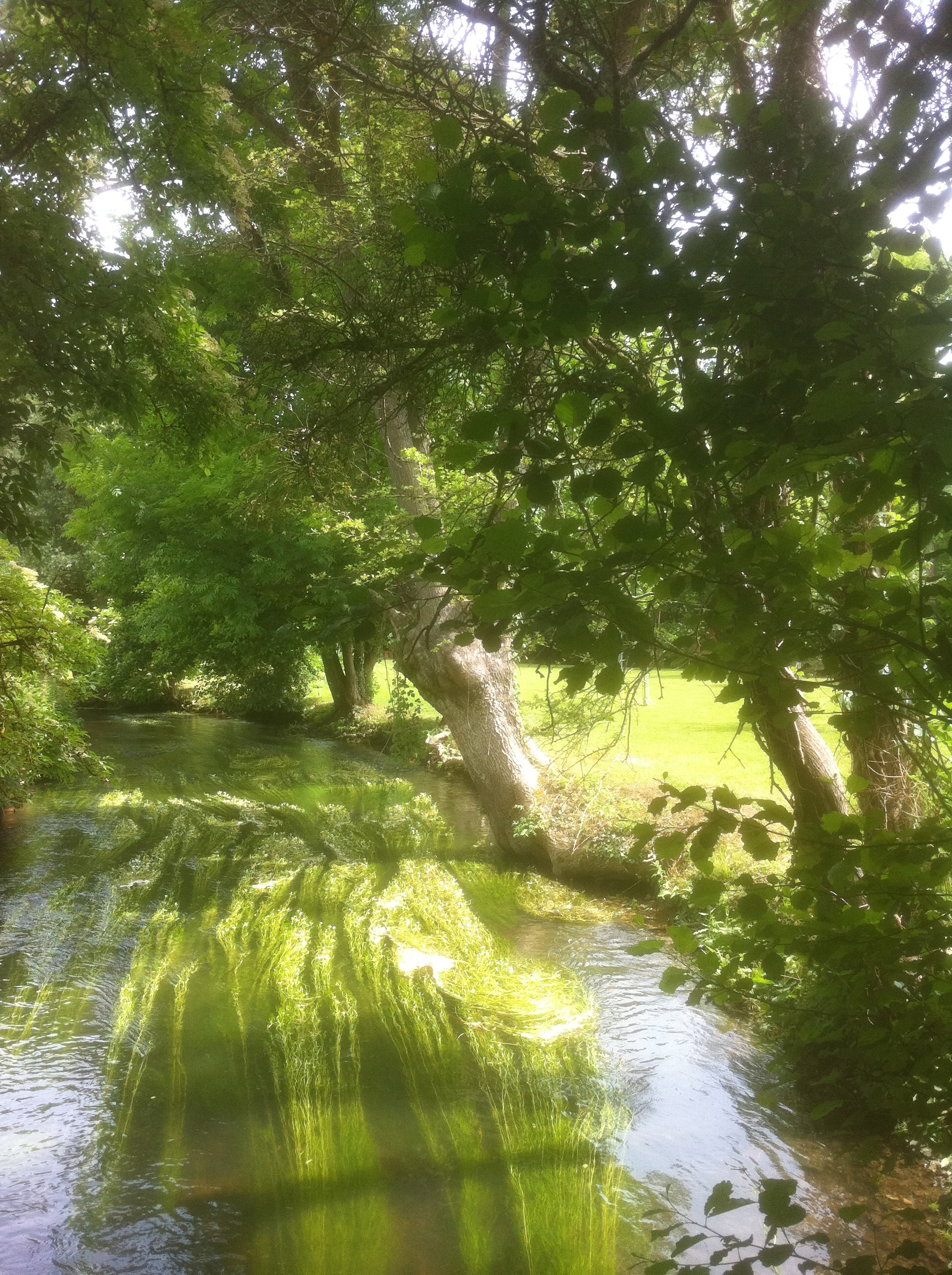
- The Iton stream in Brosville

- Coat of arms
- Location of Brosville
- Location within France Location within Normandy
- Coordinates: 49°06′34″N 1°06′56″E
- Country: France
- Region: Normandy
- Department: Eure
- Arrondissement: Bernay
- Canton: Le Neubourg
- Intercommunality: CC du Pays du Neubourg

Government
  - Mayor (2020–2026): Marc Romet
- Area^{1}: 7.2 km^{2} (2.8 sq mi)
- Highest elevation: 143 m (469 ft)
- Lowest elevation: 35 m (115 ft)
- Population (2023): 670
  - Density: 93/km^{2} (240/sq mi)
- Time zone: UTC+01:00 (CET)
  - Summer (DST): UTC+02:00 (CEST)
- INSEE/Postal code: 27118 /27930
- ^{1} French Land Register data, which excludes lakes, ponds, glaciers > 1 km^{2} (0.386 sq mi or 247 acres) and river estuaries.

Brosville is a commune in the Eure department in the Normandy region in northern France.

== Geography ==
The Iton river flows through the commune.

== Population ==
Historical population
| Year | Pop. | ±% p.a. |
|---|---|---|
| 1968 | 330 | — |
| 1975 | 409 | +3.11% |
| 1982 | 434 | +0.85% |
| 1990 | 573 | +3.53% |
| 1999 | 601 | +0.53% |
| 2007 | 639 | +0.77% |
| 2012 | 647 | +0.25% |
| 2017 | 633 | −0.44% |
| 2023 | 670 | +0.95% |
Source: INSEE

== See also ==
- Communes of the Eure department
