= Le Boulay-Morin =

- Commune
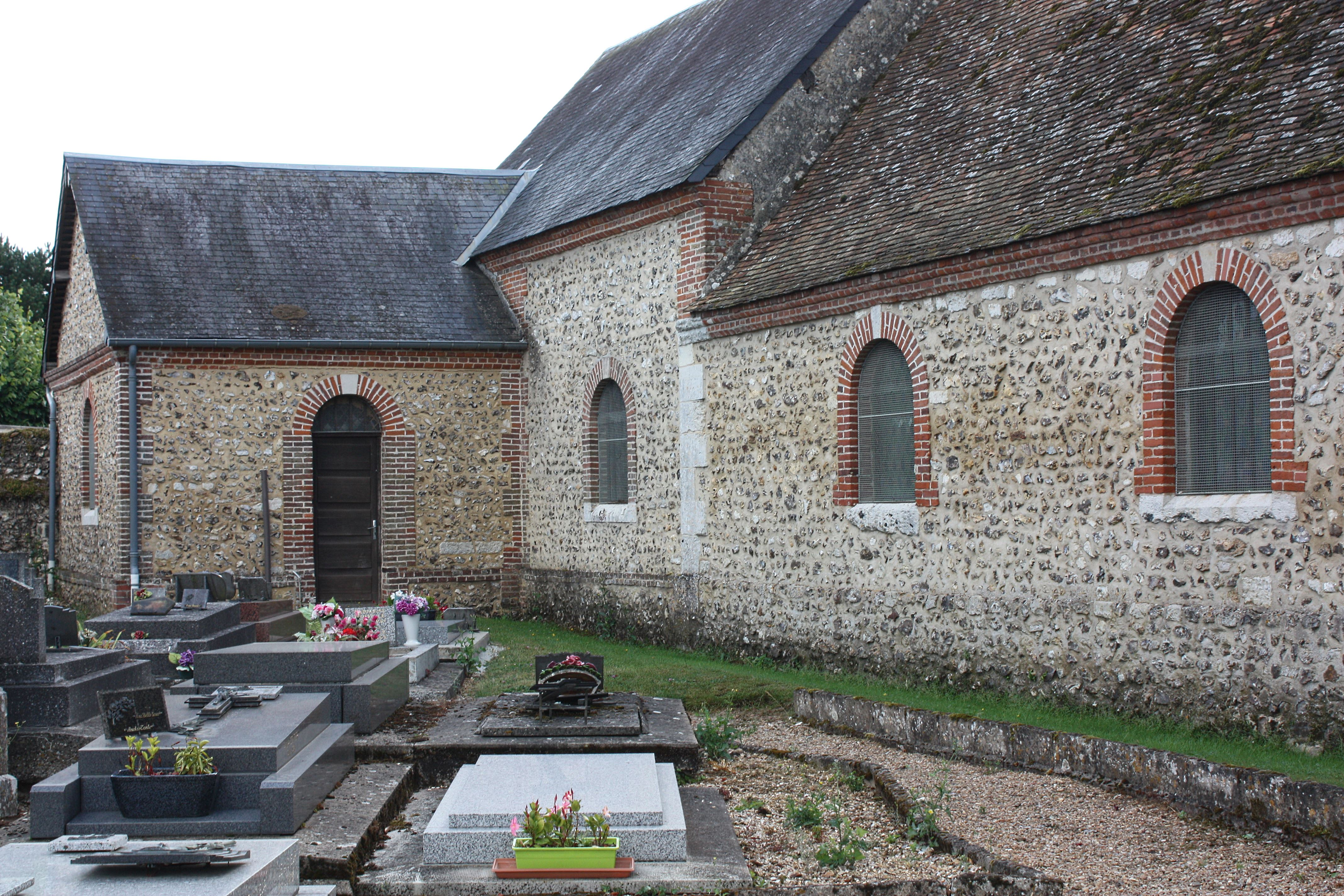
- The church in Le Boulay-Morin

- Coat of arms
- Location of Le Boulay-Morin
- Location within France Location within Normandy
- Coordinates: 49°05′09″N 1°10′46″E
- Country: France
- Region: Normandy
- Department: Eure
- Arrondissement: Évreux
- Canton: Évreux-2
- Intercommunality: CA Évreux Portes de Normandie

Government
  - Mayor (2020–2026): Olivier Rigal-Roy
- Area^{1}: 5.55 km^{2} (2.14 sq mi)
- Elevation: 145 m (476 ft)
- Highest elevation: 147 m (482 ft)
- Lowest elevation: 84 m (276 ft)
- Population (2023): 814
  - Density: 147/km^{2} (380/sq mi)
- Time zone: UTC+01:00 (CET)
  - Summer (DST): UTC+02:00 (CEST)
- INSEE/Postal code: 27099 /27930
- ^{1} French Land Register data, which excludes lakes, ponds, glaciers > 1 km^{2} (0.386 sq mi or 247 acres) and river estuaries.

Le Boulay-Morin (French pronunciation: [lə bulɛ mɔʁɛ̃]) is a commune in the Eure department in Normandy in northern France.

== Population ==
Historical population
Year	Pop.	±% p.a.
1968	151	—
1975	400	+14.93%
1982	457	+1.92%
1990	516	+1.53%
1999	558	+0.87%
2007	653	+1.98%
2012	721	+2.00%
2017	777	+1.51%
2023	814	+0.78%
Source: INSEE

== See also ==
- Communes of the Eure department
