= Bryan Ryley =

Canadian artist

Bryan Ryley is a Canadian artist and educator based in Vernon, British Columbia.

== Life ==
Educated at the University of Victoria and the Pratt Institute in Brooklyn, Ryley is currently an Associate Professor of Fine Arts at the University of British Columbia Okanagan.

== Work ==
Throughout his artistic career, Bryan Ryley's work moves back and forth among three media – painting, drawing, and collage.

Ryley exhibits in both Canada and The United States. His work is found in numerous private and public collections, such as, The Canada Council Art Bank, Ottawa; Kelowna Public Art Gallery, Kelowna; Vernon Public Art Gallery; The Pratt Institute in Brooklyn, New York; Petro Canada Collection; Shell Collection in Calgary, Alberta.
