= Aviron =

- Commune
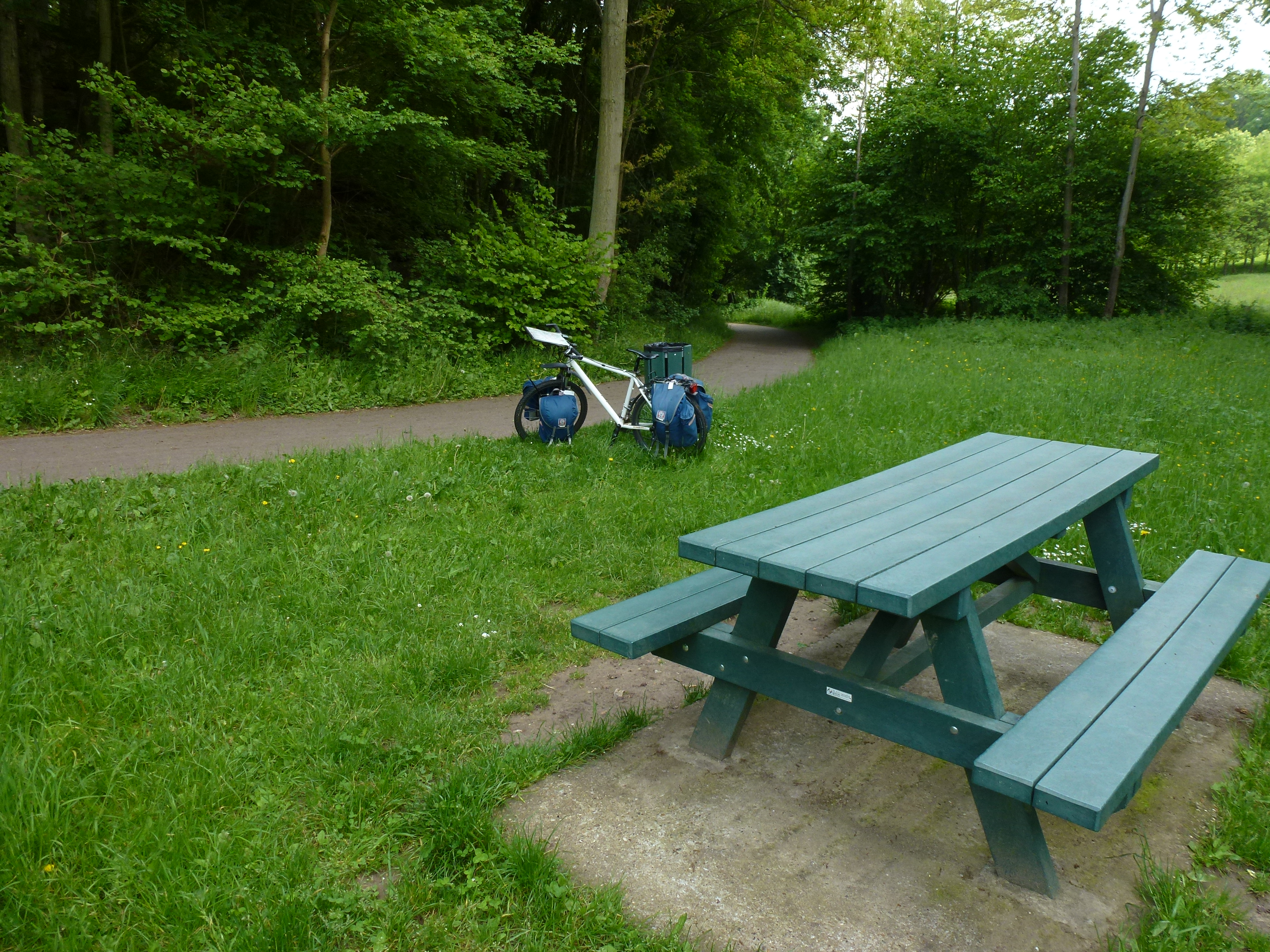
- The greenway in Aviron
- Location of Aviron
- Location within France Location within Normandy
- Coordinates: 49°03′06″N 1°07′03″E
- Country: France
- Region: Normandy
- Department: Eure
- Arrondissement: Évreux
- Canton: Évreux-2
- Intercommunality: Évreux Portes de Normandie

Government
  - Mayor (2020–2026): Sophie Bertin
- Area^{1}: 7.32 km^{2} (2.83 sq mi)
- Elevation: 133 m (436 ft)
- Highest elevation: 145 m (476 ft)
- Lowest elevation: 95 m (312 ft)
- Population (2023): 1,096
  - Density: 150/km^{2} (388/sq mi)
- Time zone: UTC+01:00 (CET)
  - Summer (DST): UTC+02:00 (CEST)
- INSEE/Postal code: 27031 /27930
- ^{1} French Land Register data, which excludes lakes, ponds, glaciers > 1 km^{2} (0.386 sq mi or 247 acres) and river estuaries.

Aviron (French pronunciation: [aviʁɔ̃]) is a commune in the Eure department in Normandy in northern France.

== Population ==
Historical population
| Year | Pop. | ±% p.a. |
|---|---|---|
| 1968 | 279 | — |
| 1975 | 454 | +7.20% |
| 1982 | 675 | +5.83% |
| 1990 | 1,136 | +6.72% |
| 1999 | 1,185 | +0.47% |
| 2007 | 1,126 | −0.64% |
| 2012 | 1,092 | −0.61% |
| 2017 | 1,100 | +0.15% |
| 2023 | 1,096 | −0.06% |
Source: INSEE

== See also ==
- Communes of the Eure department
