= Riley (brand) =

British sporting goods

- Industry: Sporting goods
- Founded: 1878
- Founders: Edward James Riley
- Headquarters: Caldicot, Wales
- Key people: Stuart Lacey (Director)
- Parent: BCE Distributors
- Website: riley-snooker-international.com

E.J. Riley, later Riley Leisure and just Riley, is a British sporting goods brand founded in 1878 by Edward John Riley, an Irish expatriate living in Manchester, England.

== History ==
E.J. Riley started as a local chain of sports retail stores, before branching out into manufacturing in the 1880s. The company first gained fame as a cricket equipment maker, and has been described as the world's largest manufacturer of cricket bats at the time.

From the 1890s, the brand expanded its range to a variety of sports and indoor games, including golf, tennis, lawn bowls, and billiards, the latter becoming its main calling card around 1910. It acquired rights to use Crystalate plastic in its early products, and later marketed a proprietary compound called "Ri-leene".

As its manufacturing business outgrew its retail division by a wide margin, E.J. Riley sold its shops in the early 1920s to focus on its Accrington factory. Founder Riley died in 1926, but the company kept expanding through various acquisitions, and eventually went public in 1977 amidst the British snooker boom of the era.

In the 1990s, Riley's fortunes began to change and, despite exporting its products to 67 countries throughout the world, the factory—by then based in Hapton—closed its doors in 2002. Rights to the brand were acquired by competitor BCE (originally Bristol Coin Equipment, later rebranded as Billiard Cues of England), who continues to use the Riley name for one of their product lines.

The Billiards Company, a Dublin-based company owned by former players John Benton and Darren Lennox, used to trade as E.J. Riley Ireland. It was formed in 1994 as a subsidiary of Riley, before going independent in 2002.

== Notable endorsers ==
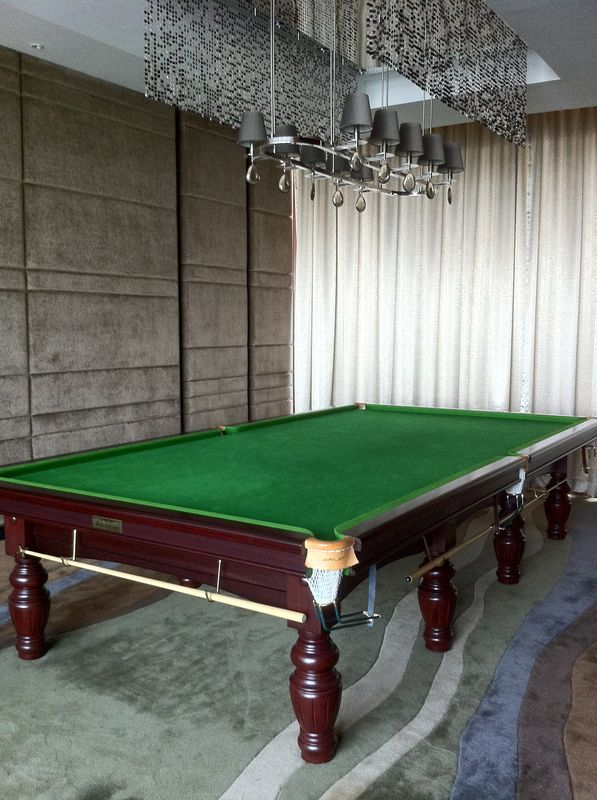
A Riley table in Hong Kong.

- Steve Davis
- Ken Doherty
- Stephen Hendry
- George Gray
- George Hirst
- Ray Reardon
- John Spencer
- Mark Williams

== Sports bar chain ==
As an outlet for its products, the company started a chain of pool halls called Rileys, which is no longer part of the same group.

== See also ==
- List of sporting goods manufacturers
