= Reuilly, Eure =

Reuilly
- Commune
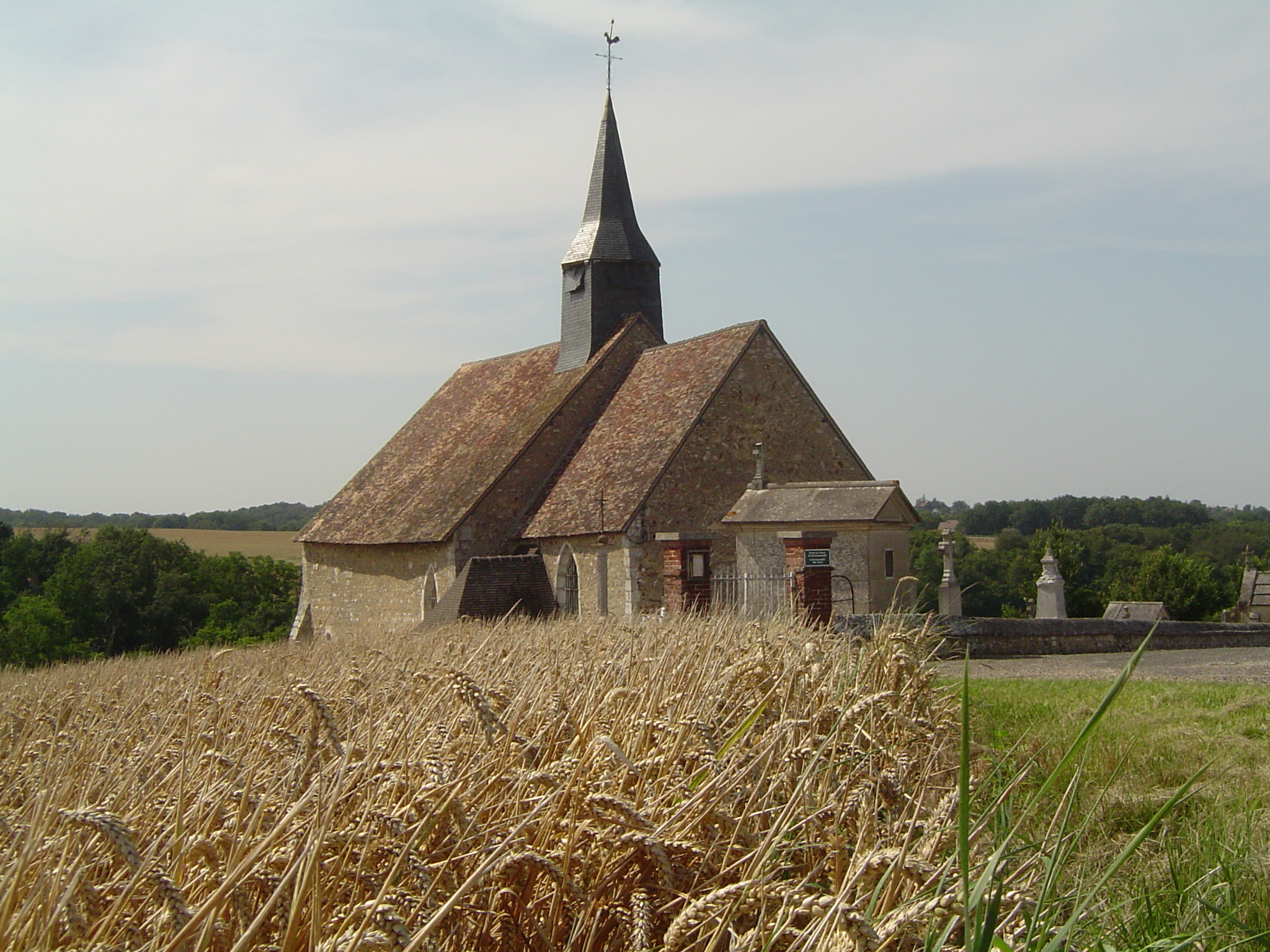
- The church in Reuilly

- Coat of arms
- Location of Reuilly
- Location within France Location within Normandy
- Coordinates: 49°04′46″N 1°13′27″E
- Country: France
- Region: Normandy
- Department: Eure
- Arrondissement: Évreux
- Canton: Évreux-2
- Intercommunality: Évreux Portes de Normandie

Government
  - Mayor (2020–2026): Thierry Lefrançois
- Area^{1}: 9.73 km^{2} (3.76 sq mi)
- Elevation: 139 m (456 ft)
- Highest elevation: 144 m (472 ft)
- Lowest elevation: 49 m (161 ft)
- Population (2023): 510
  - Density: 52/km^{2} (140/sq mi)
- Time zone: UTC+01:00 (CET)
  - Summer (DST): UTC+02:00 (CEST)
- INSEE/Postal code: 27489 /27930
- ^{1} French Land Register data, which excludes lakes, ponds, glaciers > 1 km^{2} (0.386 sq mi or 247 acres) and river estuaries.

Reuilly (French pronunciation: [ʁœji]) is a commune in the Eure department in northern France.

== Population ==
Historical population
Year	Pop.	±% p.a.
1968	199	—
1975	239	+2.65%
1982	322	+4.35%
1990	426	+3.56%
1999	501	+1.82%
2007	545	+1.06%
2012	592	+1.67%
2017	525	−2.37%
2023	510	−0.48%
Source: INSEE

== See also ==
- Communes of the Eure department
