= Reilly =

Reilly may refer to:

== Places ==
- Reilly, Oise, commune in France
- Reilly, California, in Inyo County
- Reilly Township, Pennsylvania
- Reilly, County Fermanagh, a townland in County Fermanagh, Northern Ireland

== Other ==
- Reilly (surname)
- Reilly (band), an American Christian folk rock band
- Reilly, Ace of Spies, a 1983 British television series
- Reilly's Law of Retail Gravitation, a principle of economics

== See also ==
- Mary Reilly (disambiguation)
- O'Reilly (disambiguation)
- The Life of Riley (disambiguation)
