= Charles Nelson Reilly =

American comedian and actor (1931–2007)

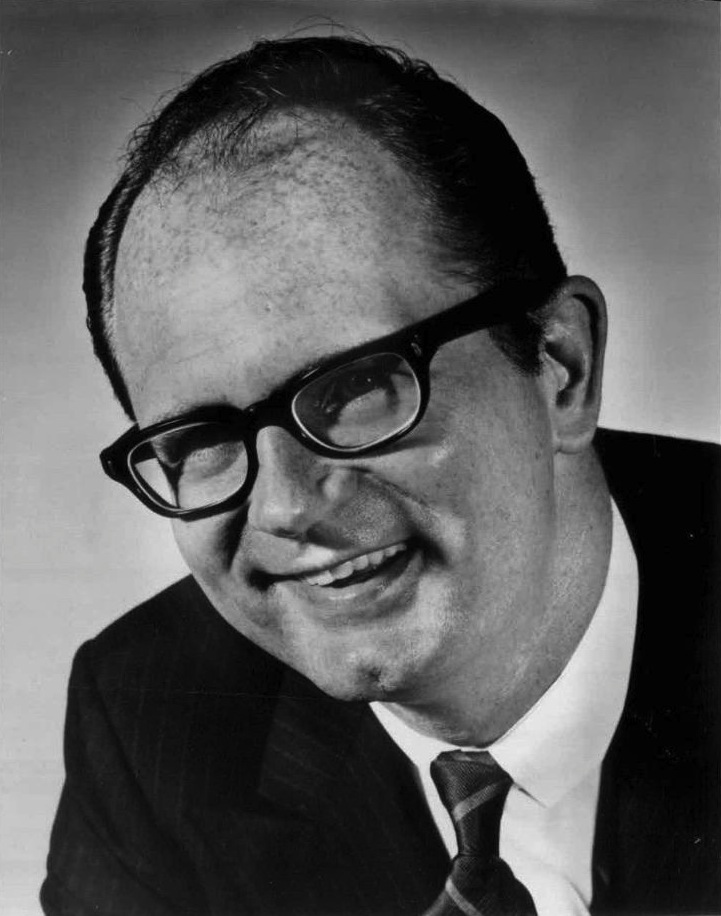
- Reilly in a 1969 publicity photo
- Born: January 13, 1931; New York City, U.S.
- Died: May 25, 2007 (aged 76); Los Angeles, California, U.S.
- Education: Hartt School of Music
- Occupations: Actor; comedian; director; drama teacher
- Years active: 1957–2007
- Height: 6 ft 2 in (188 cm)
- Partner: Patrick Hughes (1980–2007; his death)
- Awards: Tony Award for Best Featured Actor in a Musical; 1962 How to Succeed in Business Without Really Trying

Charles Nelson Reilly (January 13, 1931 – May 25, 2007) was an American actor, comedian, director and drama teacher. He performed in the original Broadway casts of Bye Bye Birdie; Hello, Dolly!; and How to Succeed in Business Without Really Trying, for which he won the Tony Award for Best Featured Actor in a Musical. His television credits include The Ghost & Mrs. Muir and Match Game. A recording of his autobiographical one-man play Save It for the Stage: The Life of Reilly was adapted into a 2006 independent film.

== Early life ==
Reilly was born January 13, 1931, in New York City in the Bronx, to an Irish-Catholic father and a Swedish Lutheran mother. When young, he would amuse himself by creating puppet theater, and his mother often told him to "save it for the stage".

In 1944, at age 13, Reilly was at a circus in Hartford, Connecticut before it caught fire and killed 167 people. Because of the event's trauma, he was afraid of sitting in an audience, the large crowds reminding him of what happened that day. As he often stated on The Tonight Show and other such venues, he rarely attended plays—even when directing a play or stage production, he preferred to sit at the back of the house or the back of a balcony near the exits to preview his work, including one time where his leading lady's costume caught fire (but on recounting this episode to Johnny Carson, Reilly assured him "but you know, these things always work out okay.")

Reilly developed a love of opera and wanted to become an opera singer. He entered the Hartt School of Music as a voice major, but abandoned this pursuit when he realized that he lacked the natural vocal talent to have a major career. However, opera remained a lifelong passion, and he was a frequent guest on opera-themed radio programs, including the Metropolitan Opera radio broadcasts. He directed opera productions for the Chicago Opera Theater, Dallas Opera, Portland Opera, San Diego Opera, and Santa Fe Opera. He was good friends with opera singers Renée Fleming, Rod Gilfry, Roberta Peters, and Eileen Farrell.

== Career ==
=== Stage ===
Reilly made his film debut with an uncredited role in A Face in the Crowd (1957), directed by Elia Kazan, although most of his early career was spent on the stage. He was a regular performer in comic roles for several summer seasons in the 1950s at the Starlight Theatre in Kansas City, Missouri. Reilly appeared in many Off Broadway productions. His big break came in 1960 with the enormously successful original Broadway production of Bye Bye Birdie. In the groundbreaking musical, Reilly had a small onstage part and was Dick Van Dyke's understudy/replacement for the leading role.

In 1961, Reilly was in the original cast of another Broadway show, the Pulitzer Prize-winning musical How to Succeed in Business Without Really Trying. For his memorable origination of the role of Bud Frump, Reilly earned a 1962 Tony Award for featured actor in a musical.

In 1964, Reilly was in the original cast of Hello, Dolly!, another successful Broadway show. For originating the role of Cornelius Hackl, Reilly received a second nomination for a Tony Award for performance by an actor in a featured role in a musical.

=== Television ===
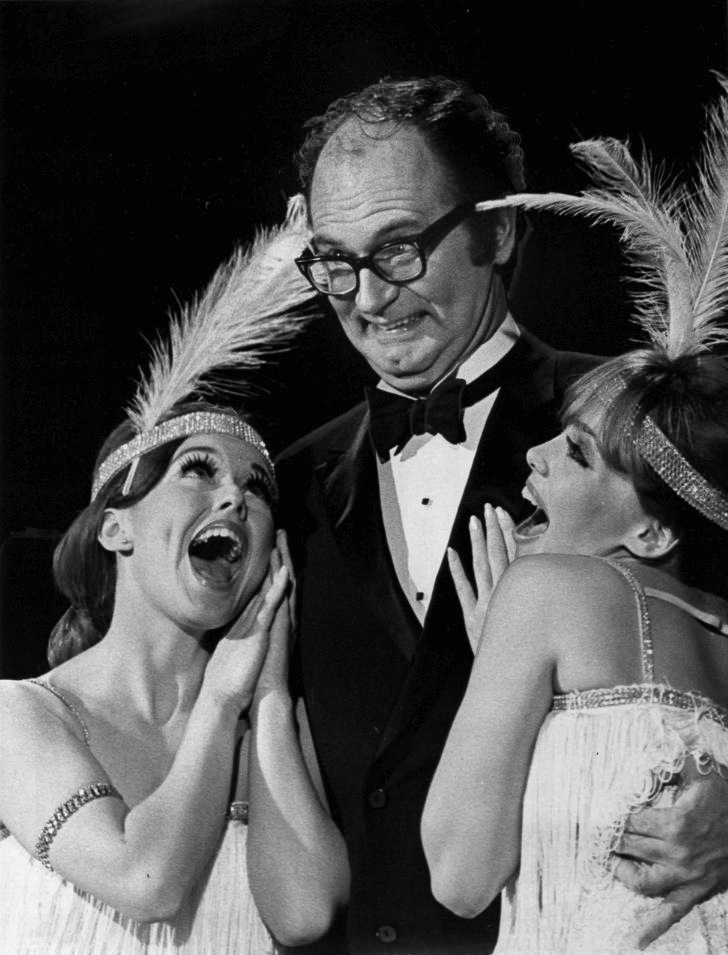
Reilly in a publicity photo for The Golddiggers in 1970

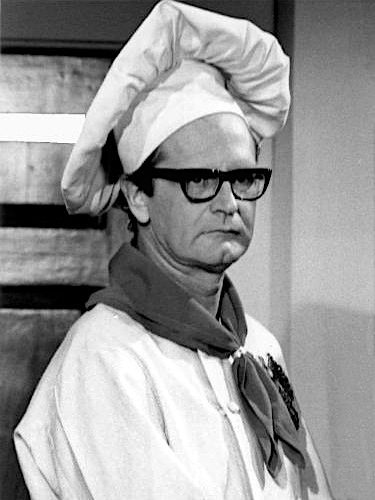
Reilly as "Randy Robinson" on the CBS television series Arnie in 1971

Reilly kept active in Broadway shows but he became better known for his TV work, appearing regularly on television in the 1960s. He appeared as a Mystery Guest and was a panelist on the What's My Line? quiz show. In 1965 he appeared several times on The Steve Lawrence Show, which aired for a single season. Television commercials that he made throughout the 1960s, 1970s and 1980s included Excedrin, Bic Banana Ink Crayons and Purina Mills Dog Food.

From 1968 to 1970, he appeared as the bumbler Claymore Gregg on the television series The Ghost & Mrs. Muir, for which he received an Emmy nomination. He also appeared as a regular on The Dean Martin Show and had guest appearances on various television series, including McMillan & Wife, The Patty Duke Show, Here's Lucy, Rowan & Martin's Laugh-In, The Love Boat, and Love, American Style. In 1971, he appeared as the evil magician Hoodoo in Lidsville, a children's program on ABC created by Sid and Marty Krofft.

Reilly was a frequent guest on The Tonight Show Starring Johnny Carson, appearing more than 100 times. He was a lively and reliable talk-show guest and lived within blocks of the Burbank studios where The Tonight Show was taped, so he was often asked to be a last-minute replacement for scheduled guests who canceled or did not make it to the studio on time.

Reilly was a fixture on game shows, primarily due to his appearances as a regular panelist on Match Game. He was one of the longest-running guests, and often engaged in playful banter with fellow regular Brett Somers (the two generally sat next to each other on the show—Somers in the upper middle seat and Reilly in the upper right seat). He typically offered sardonic commentary and peppered his answers with homosexuality-themed double entendres which pushed the boundaries of 1970s television standards.

During the taping of Match Game '74, Reilly left for a short time to film Hamburgers (1974) and to star in the Neil Simon play God's Favorite (December 1974 to March 1975). From 1975 to 1976, he starred in another live-action children's program titled Uncle Croc's Block, with Jonathan Harris. He was often a guest celebrity on the 1984 game show Body Language, including one week with Lucille Ball and another week with Audrey Landers.

=== Later career ===
From 1976, Reilly primarily taught acting and directing for television and theater, including directing Julie Harris (with whom he had acted in Skyscraper in 1965–66), who was portraying Emily Dickinson in her one-woman Broadway play The Belle of Amherst, by William Luce. In 1979, he directed Ira Levin's play Break a Leg on Broadway. Despite the previous year's success of Levin's Deathtrap, Break a Leg closed after one performance. The New York Times reported that Reilly resigned from directing the show before it actually opened. Citing creative differences with Levin, Reilly requested through his attorney that his name be removed from the program and Palace Theatre marquee. Within days, Reilly appeared on The Tonight Show, joking and speaking at length about the show's failure, saying, "So [a play] can open and last six years, eight years ... or two hours and five minutes." Reilly earned a 1997 Tony Award nomination as Best Director of a Play for the revival of The Gin Game, starring Julie Harris.

In 1988, Reilly hosted the syndicated game show Sweethearts, which ran for one season.

In 1990, he directed episodes of Evening Shade. Reilly also made guest appearances in the 1990s on The Drew Carey Show, The Larry Sanders Show, Family Matters, Second Noah, and as eccentric writer Jose Chung in the television series The X-Files ("Jose Chung's From Outer Space") and Millennium ("Jose Chung's Doomsday Defense"). Reilly was nominated for Emmy Awards in 1998 and 1999 for his performances in The Drew Carey Show and Millennium, respectively.

Reilly was a frequent vocal presence in animation, with lead roles as Fred and Wilma's neighbor Frank Frankenstone in Hanna-Barbera's The Flintstone Comedy Show (1980), and as Mr. Toad in the Rankin/Bass feature, The Wind in the Willows (1987). Reilly had a voice role in three films by Don Bluth: All Dogs Go to Heaven as Killer in 1989, Rock-a-Doodle as Hunch in 1991, and A Troll in Central Park as King Llort in 1994. In each one, he played the villain's dim-witted sidekick who reformed at the end. He was the original voice of the Dirty Bubble on SpongeBob SquarePants.

Reilly was a longtime teacher of acting at HB Studio, the acting studio founded by Herbert Berghof and made famous by Berghof and his wife, the renowned stage actress Uta Hagen. His acting students included Lily Tomlin, Bette Midler, and Gary Burghoff.

== Personal life ==
Magazine and newspaper profiles of Reilly throughout the 1970s and 1980s did not mention his personal life. Years after the cancellation of Match Game, he revealed his orientation as gay in his July 2000 theatrical one-man show Save It for the Stage: The Life of Reilly.

Much like fellow actor and game-show regular Paul Lynde of the same era, despite Reilly's off-camera silence, he gave signals on-camera of a campy persona. In many episodes of Match Game, he lampooned himself by briefly affecting "YO!" in a deep voice, using the nickname "Chuck", and self-consciously describing how "butch" he was. Many years after his game show career ended, he mentioned in a 2002 interview with Entertainment Tonight that he felt no need to explain his jokes about Chuck and that he never purposefully hid his homosexuality from anyone. Patrick Hughes, a set decorator and dresser, was Reilly's domestic partner; the two met backstage while Reilly appeared on the game show Battlestars, although their partnership was not revealed publicly. They lived together in Beverly Hills.

Reilly did appear on several episodes of the game show Tattletales with actress Elizabeth Allen as a couple, though their relationship was never discussed on the air.

Reilly was linked publicly with the United States Coast Guard and made at least two films in conjunction with the Coast Guard. He regularly advertised National Safe Boating Week as a panelist on Match Game. Reilly died on May 25, 2007, the last day of National Safe Boating Week.

Reilly had already gone bald by the time he had begun appearing on television in the 1960s but donned a toupée when he began appearing on Match Game and continued to sport the hairpiece into the early 1990s. During the taping of Match Game '74, his toupée became a joke when Reilly had to go to New York City to have his toupée adjusted. During the taping of several episodes, Reilly was seen wearing different hats because his toupée was back in New York waiting for him to be fitted. This was the start of the long-running jokes on Match Game about his hair. He abandoned the toupée in the late 1990s and appeared bald in all of his subsequent public events. He dramatized the experience in his stage show The Life of Reilly. In one episode of Match Game PM, he took off his toupée and gave it to a bald contestant by putting it on his head. One can briefly see Reilly's bald head before he covers it up with another hat.

== Final years and death ==
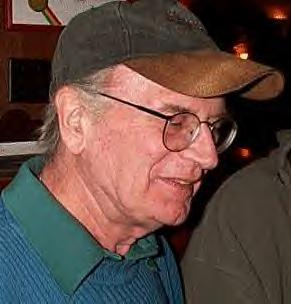
Reilly in 2000

Reilly spent his later life primarily touring America directing theater and opera and offering audiences a glimpse into his background and personal life with a critically acclaimed one-man play chronicling his life, titled Save It for the Stage: The Life of Reilly. In 2004, his final two performances of his play in North Hollywood, California, were recorded as the basis of an autobiographical independent film titled The Life of Reilly.

Reilly was stricken with respiratory problems while filming The Life of Reilly and retired from directing and performing immediately after the final day of shooting in 2004. The movie premiered in March 2006 at the South by Southwest film festival, and Reilly's film performance was acclaimed. He cancelled his personal appearance at South by Southwest due to his illness, and by the time the film premiered, he had been hospitalized. Reilly died of complications from pneumonia at the UCLA Medical Center on May 25, 2007. That weekend, the Game Show Network dedicated its programming to Reilly, airing some of his funniest episodes of Match Game.

== Filmography ==
=== Film ===
Year	Title	Role	Notes
1957	A Face in the Crowd	Unknown	Uncredited
1967	The Tiger Makes Out	Registrar	
1984	Cannonball Run II	Don Don Canneloni	
1987	The Wind in the Willows	Mr. Toad	Voice; television film
1987	Body Slam	Vic Carson	Direct-to-video
1989	All Dogs Go to Heaven	Killer	Voice
1991	Rock-a-Doodle	Hunch	Voice
1994	A Troll in Central Park	Llort	Voice
1997	Babes in Toyland	Humpty Dumpty	Voice
1998	An All Dogs Christmas Carol	Killer	Voice; direct-to-video
1998	The First of May	Dinghy	
2002	Gaydar	Uncle Vincent	Short film
2006	Tom and Jerry: Shiver Me Whiskers	Red Parrot Stan	Voice; direct-to-video
2007	The Life of Reilly	Himself / Archive footage	Documentary; posthumous release

=== Stage ===
Year	Title	Role	Notes
1960–61	Bye Bye Birdie	Mr. Henkel/Albert Peterson's understudy	
1961–65	How to Succeed in Business Without Really Trying	Bud Frump	
1964–70	Hello, Dolly!	Cornelius Hackl	
1965–66	Skyscraper	Roger Summerhill	
1968	Private Lives	—N/a	Director
1974–75	God's Favorite	Sidney Lipton	
1976	The Belle of Amherst	—N/a	Director
1979	Break a Leg	—N/a	Director
1980	Charlotte	Josias von Stein	
1987–88	The Nerd	—N/a	Director
1994	Exile in Jerusalem	—N/a	Director at the Williamstown Theatre Festival w/Julie Harris & Dennis Boutsikaris
1997	The Gin Game	—N/a	Director

=== Television ===
Year	Title	Role	Notes
1962	Car 54, Where Are You?	Hilton Hartford Harlow	Episode: "Occupancy August 1st"
1963	The Patty Duke Show	Coach Coglan	Episode: "The Conquering Hero"
1968–70	The Ghost & Mrs. Muir	Claymore Gregg	Main role, 50 episodes
1969–70	It Takes Two	—N/a	Game show
1970	Here's Lucy	Elroy P. Clunk	Episode: "Lucy the Crusader"
1971–72	Arnie	Randy Robinson	8 episodes
1971–73	Lidsville	Horatio J. HooDoo	Main role, 17 episodes
1972	The New Dick Van Dyke Show	Walter O'Connell	Episode "Bernie Did It"
1972	Call Her Mom	Dean Walden	ABC Movie of the Week
1973	$10,000 Pyramid	—N/a	Celebrity guest playing opposite Shani Wallis
1973–74	It Pays to Be Ignorant	—N/a	Radio show Regular panelist
1973–82, 1990–91	Match Game	—N/a	Game show
1975–76	Uncle Croc's Block	Uncle Croc	Voice; Main role, 30 episodes
1979–82, 1984–89, approx.	Password Plus and Super Password	—N/a	Game shows
1980–82	The Flintstone Comedy Show	Frank Frankenstone	Main role, 18 episodes
1982	Madame's Place	Himself	Episode: "The Blushing Bride"
1983–84	Match Game-Hollywood Squares Hour	—N/a	Game show
1984–85	Body Language	—N/a	Game show
1987	Out of This World	Himself	Episode: "Dueling Mayors"
1988-89	Sweethearts	—N/a	Game show Host
1992	Goof Troop	Dutch Spackle	Voice; Episode: "Unreal Estate"
1992	Designing Women	Himself	Episode: "L.A. Story"
1992–93	Space Cats	D.O.R.C. (Disembodied Omnipotent Ruler of Cats)	Voice; Main role, 13 episodes
1993	Rugrats	Edmund Haynes	Voice; Episode: "Game Show Didi"
1993	The Pink Panther	Jules Parrot	Voice; Main role, 60 episodes
1996	The Larry Sanders Show	Himself	Episode: "Everybody Loves Larry"
1996	The X-Files	Jose Chung	Episode: "Jose Chung's From Outer Space"
1996	Family Matters	Mr. Veerland	Episode: "Getting Buff"
1996–99	All Dogs Go to Heaven: The Series	Killer	Voice; Main role, 40 episodes
1997	Millennium	Jose Chung	Episode: "Jose Chung's Doomsday Defense"
1998	Disney's Hercules: The Animated Series	King Minos	Episode: "Hercules and the Minotaur"
1998–99	The Drew Carey Show	Mr. Hathaway	Episodes: "DrugCo", "The Salon"
2000	SpongeBob SquarePants	Dirty Bubble	Voice; Episode: "Mermaid Man and Barnacle Boy II"

=== Video games ===
Year	Title	Voice	Note
1996	You Don't Know Jack Volume 2	Himself	
1997	You Don't Know Jack Movies	Himself	
2001	SpongeBob SquarePants: SuperSponge	Dirty Bubble	
2005	SpongeBob SquarePants: Lights, Camera, Pants!	Dirty Bubble	Final role

== In popular culture ==
For Big Lizard in My Backyard, their 1985 debut album, Philadelphia punk band The Dead Milkmen recorded a song titled "Serrated Edge" that features numerous absurd references to Reilly as a Jesus figure and orgy centerpiece.

In 2001, Reilly was the subject of a sketch on Saturday Night Live, spoofing Inside the Actors Studio, and was portrayed by Alec Baldwin. A later Baldwin character, the Generalissimo from 30 Rock, mentions both Julie Harris and The Belle of Amherst, which Reilly had directed. A 2008 parody of Match Game on Saturday Night Live included Fred Armisen playing a Reilly-like character. In the sketch, the host is found murdered moments before the show's taping; the subsequent on-air police investigation reveals that he had been having a clandestine homosexual affair with the Reilly character. Baldwin briefly reprised his portrayal of Reilly in the 30 Rock episode "Live from Studio 6H" (West Coast airing), appearing on the "joke wall" in a parody of Rowan & Martin's Laugh-In.

"Weird Al" Yankovic wrote and recorded a tribute song titled "CNR" done in the style of The White Stripes, jokingly caricaturing Reilly with parodies of the internet phenomenon Chuck Norris facts, with absurdities like winning the Tour de France "with two flat tires and a missing chain", or how "every day he'd make the host of Match Game give him a piggyback ride". This was part of Yankovic's digital Internet Leaks EP and was included on the 2011 CD release Alpocalypse. The music video was released by JibJab on August 4, 2009. Yankovic again referenced Reilly within a sight gag present in the end credits of his 2022 spoof biopic Weird: The Al Yankovic Story which implies that Reilly engaged in career-long stalking of the fictionalized Yankovic.

In season two, episode one of The Life and Times of Tim, one character observes another acting a line from their play and says, "I saw Charles Nelson Reilly do that, and you did it better."

== Awards and nominations ==
Year	Award	Category	Work	Result
1962	Tony Award	Best Featured Actor in a Musical	How to Succeed in Business Without Really Trying	Won
1964	Tony Award	Best Featured Actor in a Musical	Hello, Dolly!	Nominated
1970	Primetime Emmy	Outstanding Supporting Actor in a Comedy Series	The Ghost & Mrs. Muir	Nominated
1997	Tony Award	Best Direction of a Play	The Gin Game	Nominated
1998	Primetime Emmy	Outstanding Guest Actor in a Drama Series	Millennium ("Jose Chung's Doomsday Defense")	Nominated
1999	Primetime Emmy	Outstanding Guest Actor in a Comedy Series	The Drew Carey Show	Nominated
2002	Drama Desk	Outstanding Solo Performance	Save It for the Stage: The Life of Reilly	Nominated
2002	Outer Critics Circle	Outstanding Solo Performance	Save It for the Stage: The Life of Reilly	Nominated
