= Riley (surname) =

Riley is a surname of English origin, as well as an Anglicized version of an Irish surname.

The name has the meaning "rye clearing", or is from one of several placenames, including High Riley in Accrington, Lancashire, and in Devon. In the United Kingdom Census 1881, more than a third of Rileys were in Lancashire; it was most prevalent in the east of the county and over the boundary into the Calder Valley in Yorkshire, and the name could be found in these areas from the 13th century. The name is also an Anglicized version of the Irish surname O'Reilly. This is derived from the first name Raghallach; the Gaelic version of the surname, Ó Raghallaigh, is Irish for 'grandson (or descendant) of Raghallach'.

== People with the surname ==
=== A ===
- Aaron Riley (born 1980), American mixed martial artist
- Adam Riley (born 1992), English cricketer
- Adrian Riley (born 1971), British graphic designer
- Aidan Riley (born 1991), Australian rules footballer
- Al Riley (born 1953), American politician
- Alan Incell Riley (1897–1960), British Air Force pilot
- Alban Riley (1844–1914), Australian politician
- Ali Riley (born 1987), American-New Zealand footballer
- Alice Riley (1860–1955), American author
- Alexander Riley (disambiguation), multiple people
- Alexandria Riley, Welsh actress
- Alrick Riley (born 1964), English television director
- Amber Riley (born 1986), American actress and singer
- Andrea Riley (born 1988), American basketball player
- Andrew Riley (born 1988), Jamaican sprinter
- Andy Riley (born 1970), British writer and cartoonist
- Angela R. Riley, American jurist
- Antonio R. Riley (born 1963), American politician
- Arthur Riley (1903–1984), South African footballer
- Arthur Dewhurst Riley (1860–1929), English-New Zealand artist
- Ashley Riley (born 1995), Bahamian sprinter
- Atsuro Riley, American writer
- Audrey Riley, English cellist
- Austin Riley (born 1997), American baseball player
- Avon Riley (1958–2020), American football player

=== B ===
- Barbara Riley, American civil servant
- Barbra Riley (born 1949), American photographer
- Bennet C. Riley (1790–1853), American politician
- Bernard Riley (born 1981), American football player
- Bill Riley (disambiguation), multiple people
- Ben Riley (1933–2017), American jazz drummer
- Ben Riley (politician) (1866–1946), British politician
- Bernard Riley (born 1981), American football player
- Blair Riley (born 1985), Canadian ice hockey player
- Bob Riley (disambiguation), multiple people
- Boots Riley (born 1971), American vocalist
- Brad Riley (born 1974), New Zealand basketball player
- Brendan Riley (born 1996), American ice hockey coach
- Brett Riley (disambiguation), multiple people
- Brian Riley (disambiguation), multiple people
- Bridget Riley (born 1931), British op-art painter
- Bridgett Riley (born 1973), American boxer
- Brittany Riley (born 1986), American hammer thrower
- Bud Riley (1925–2012), American football coach
- Burke Riley (1914–2006), American state legislator

=== C ===
- Camden Riley (born 1996), American soccer player
- Catherine Riley (1947–2024), American politician
- Celeste Riley (born 1960), American politician
- Chad Riley, American soccer coach
- Chantel Riley, Jamaican-Canadian actress
- Charles Riley (disambiguation), multiple people
- Charlotte Riley (born 1981), English actress
- Cheryl Riley (disambiguation), multiple people
- Chris Riley (disambiguation), multiple people
- Christopher Riley (born 1967), English writer and film maker
- Chuck Riley (disambiguation), multiple people
- Claude Riley (born 1960), American basketball player
- Clay Riley (born 1975), American politician
- Clement A. Riley (1905–1988), American politician
- Cliff Riley (born 1927), Australian rules footballer
- Conor Riley, American football coach
- Corinne Boyd Riley (1893–1979), American politician
- Curtis Riley (born 1992), American football player

=== D ===
- Daniel Riley (disambiguation), multiple people
- David Riley (disambiguation), multiple people
- Davis Riley (born 1996), American golfer
- Dawn Riley (born 1964), American sailor
- Delbert Riley, Canadian First Nations leader
- Del Riley (clerk) (1925–2018), American politician
- Denise Riley (born 1948), English professor
- Dennis Riley (1943–1999), American composer
- Dennis L. Riley (1945–2023), American politician
- Derek Riley (1922–2018), Canadian rower
- Derrick Riley (1915–1993), British air force officer
- Dick Riley (??–2010), American politician
- Don Riley (1923–2015), American sportswriter
- Don Riley (American football) (1933–2022), American football player
- Donna Riley, American professor
- Dorothy Comstock Riley (1924–2004), American lawyer
- Doug Riley (1945–2007), Canadian musician
- Duke Riley (disambiguation), multiple people
- Dylan Riley (disambiguation), multiple people

=== E ===
- Earl Riley (1890–1965), American politician and businessman
- Edna G. Riley (1880–1962), American screenwriter
- Edward Riley (disambiguation), multiple people
- Edwin Riley (1867–1936), English cricketer
- Elaine Riley (1917–2015), American actress
- Eleanor Riley, English professor
- Elijah Riley (born 1998), American football player
- Elizabeth Riley (1792–1855), American abolitionist
- Emily Riley (disambiguation), multiple people
- Emmett Riley (born 1969), American politician
- Eric Riley (born 1970), American basketball player
- Erin M. Riley (born 1985), American artist
- Eron Riley (born 1987), American football player
- Estela Riley (born 1969), Panamanian judoka
- Ezra Riley (1866–1937), Canadian politician

=== F ===
- Felix Riley, British novelist
- Fletcher Riley (1893–1966), American judge
- Ford Riley, American producer
- Frank Riley (disambiguation), multiple people
- Frederick Riley (disambiguation), multiple people
- Freida J. Riley (1937–1969), American teacher

=== G ===
- Garrett Riley (born 1989), American football coach
- Gary Riley (born 1967), American actor
- George Riley (disambiguation), multiple people
- Giana Riley (born 2004), American soccer player
- Gillian Riley (born 1945), English writer
- Gina Riley (born 1961), Australian actor
- Glenn Riley (born 1992), English rugby league footballer
- Glyn Riley (born 1958), English footballer
- Gordon Arthur Riley (1911–1985), American oceanographer
- Guy Riley (1884–1964), British Army officer
- Gwendoline Riley (born 1979), English writer
- Gyan Riley (born 1977), American guitarist

=== H ===
- Harold Riley (disambiguation), multiple people
- Harry Riley (disambiguation), multiple people
- Hayden Riley (1921–1995), American basketball coach
- H. Chauncey Riley (1835–1904), English missionary
- Helen Caldwell Day Riley (1926–2013), American nurse
- Henry Riley (disambiguation), multiple people
- Herbert D. Riley (1904–1973), American admiral
- Herlin Riley (born 1957), American jazz drummer
- Herman Riley (1933–2007), American saxophone player
- Horrie Riley (1902–1970), Australian rules footballer
- Howard Riley (disambiguation), multiple people
- H. Sanford Riley (born 1951), Canadian lawyer
- Hugh Riley (1929–2004), Scottish boxer
- Hughen Riley (born 1947), English footballer

=== I ===
- Ida Morey Riley (1856–1901), American teacher
- Isaac Riley (disambiguation), multiple people
- Ivan Riley (1900–1943), American athlete
- Ivers Riley (1932–2015), American financier

=== J ===
- Jack Riley (disambiguation), multiple people
- Jake Riley (disambiguation), multiple people
- Jalen Riley (born 1993), American basketball player
- James Riley (disambiguation), multiple people
- Janet Mary Riley (1915–2008), American activist
- Jason Riley (disambiguation), multiple people
- Jeannie C. Riley (born 1945), American singer
- Jeannine Riley (born 1940), American actress
- Jeff Riley (1880–1954), Australian rules footballer
- Jenelle Riley (born 1982), American actress
- Jesse D. Riley (1890–1964), American medical doctor
- Jim Riley (disambiguation), multiple people
- Jo Riley, British writer
- Joan Riley (born 1958), Jamaican-British author
- Joe Riley (disambiguation), multiple people
- Joellen Riley (born 1957), Australian lawyer
- John Riley (disambiguation), multiple people
- Jonathan Riley (born 1955), American philosopher
- Jonathon Riley (disambiguation), multiple people
- Jordon Riley (born 1998), American football player
- Joseph Riley (disambiguation), multiple people
- Judith Merkle Riley (1942–2010), American writer
- Julia Riley, English astrophysicist

=== K ===
- Karen Riley (born 1963), American psychologist
- Karon Riley (born 1978), American football player
- Kate Riley, American television presenter
- Ken Riley (disambiguation), multiple people
- Kevin Riley (disambiguation), multiple people
- Kurt Riley (born 1987), American musician

=== L ===
- Laken Riley (2002–2024), American murder victim
- Larry Riley (disambiguation), multiple people
- Lawrence Riley (disambiguation), multiple people
- Leanne Riley (born 1993), English rugby union footballer
- Lee Riley (1932–2011), American football player
- Leon Riley (1906–1970), American basketball player
- Les Riley (1908–1999), English cricketer
- Lincoln Riley (born 1983), American football coach
- Linda Riley, British journalist
- Lisa Riley (born 1976), English actress
- Llewellyn Riley (born 1972), Barbadian footballer
- Lou Riley (1909–1989), Australian rules footballer
- Lucinda Riley (1966–2021), Irish author
- Luther Riley (born 1972), American basketball coach
- Lynne Riley (born 1958), American politician
- Lynette Riley (born 1956), Australian professor of Aboriginal Education and Indigenous Studies

=== M ===
- Maggie Riley (??–2015), English actress
- Malcolm Riley (born 1960), British musician
- Marc Riley (born 1961), British musician
- Marcus Riley (born 1984), American football player
- Margaret Riley (1965–2024), American film producer
- Mark Riley (disambiguation), multiple people
- Martin Riley (disambiguation), multiple people
- Mary Riley (disambiguation), multiple people
- Matt Riley (born 1979), American baseball player
- Matthew Riley (born 1974), British businessman
- Michael Riley (disambiguation), multiple people
- Mike Riley (disambiguation), multiple people
- Monique Riley (born 1995), Australian actress
- Murray Riley (1925–2020), Australian rower
- Mykal Riley (born 1985), American basketball player

=== N ===
- Nancy Riley (born 1958), American politician
- Napoleon Riley (1881–1941), American football player
- Nicky Riley (born 1986), Scottish footballer
- Norma Riley, American electrical engineer
- Norman Riley (disambiguation), multiple people

=== P ===
- Pat Riley (born 1945), American basketball coach
- Pat Riley (American football) (born 1972), American football player
- Patrick Riley (disambiguation), multiple people
- Paul Riley (disambiguation), multiple people
- Perry Riley (born 1988), American football player
- Peter Riley (disambiguation), multiple people
- Phil Riley, English radio personality
- Phillip Riley (born 1972), American football player
- Polly Riley (1926–2002), American golfer
- Preston Riley (born 1947), American football player

=== Q ===
- Quincy Riley (born 2001), American football player
- Quintin Riley (1905–1980), British explorer

=== R ===
- Rachael Riley (born 2004), Canadian artistic gymnast
- Rachel Riley (born 1986), English television presenter
- Rachel Riley (consultant), American civil servant
- Raf Riley, English record producer
- Ralph Riley (1924–1999), British geneticist
- Randy Riley (1962–2026), American librarian
- Raven Riley (born 1986), American actress
- Regan Riley (born 2002), English footballer
- Richard Riley (disambiguation), multiple people
- Robert Riley (disambiguation), multiple people
- Rochelle Riley, American columnist
- Roderick Riley (born 1981), American basketball player
- Ronald Riley (disambiguation), multiple people
- Rueben Riley (born 1984), American football player
- Ruth Riley (born 1979), American basketball player
- Ryan Max Riley (born 1979), American humorist and skier

=== S ===
- Sally Riley (disambiguation), multiple people
- Sam Riley (born 1980), English actor
- Sam Riley (rugby union) (born 2001), English rugby union footballer
- Samantha Riley (born 1972), Australian swimmer
- Scribz Riley (born 1993), English producer
- Sean Riley (disambiguation), multiple people
- Sharon Riley (born 1946), Puerto Rican actress
- Sid Riley (1878–1964), Australian rugby union footballer
- Stevan Riley, British film director
- Steven Riley, English immunologist
- Steve Riley (disambiguation), multiple people
- Susan Riley (disambiguation), multiple people

=== T ===
- Talay Riley (1990–2026), British singer-songwriter
- Talulah Riley (born 1985), English actress
- Tarrus Riley (born 1979), Jamaican-American reggae singer
- Teddy Riley (born 1967), American producer
- Teddy Riley (trumpeter) (1924–1992), American jazz trumpeter
- Terence Riley (disambiguation), multiple people
- Terry Riley (born 1935), American composer
- Theodore M. Riley (1842–1914), American priest
- Thomas Riley (disambiguation), multiple people
- Tim Riley (disambiguation), multiple people
- Tracy Riley (born 1966), New Zealand academic administrator
- Trevor Riley (born 1948), Australian judge

=== V ===
- Vanessa Riley, American author
- Victor Riley (born 1972), American football player
- Viddal Riley (born 1997), British boxer and internet personality

=== W ===
- Wayne Riley (born 1962), Australian golfer
- W. C. Riley (1903–1954), American football coach
- Will Riley (born 2006), Canadian basketball player
- Winston Riley (1943–2012), Jamaican singer
- William Riley (disambiguation), multiple people
- Woodbridge Riley (1869–1933), American scholar

== Fictional characters with the surname ==
- Riley family, fictional family in TV series One Life to Live
- Cpl. Scott Riley, character in Call of Duty: United Offensive
- Simon "Ghost" Riley, major character in Call of Duty: Modern Warfare 2 and it's reboot
- Riley, a fictional dog from Call of Duty: Ghost
- Mavis Riley (later Wilton), character from the British soap opera Coronation Street
- Concepta Riley (later Hewitt and Regan), character from the British soap opera Coronation Street
- Will Riley, player character from the video game American Fugitive

== See also ==
- Riley (given name), people with the given name of Riley
- O'Reilly, people with the surname of O'Reilly
- Reilly (disambiguation), a disambiguation page for Reilly
- Reilly (surname), people with the surname of Reilly
- General Riley (disambiguation), a disambiguation page for Generals with the surname of Riley
- Governor Riley (disambiguation), a disambiguation page for Governors with the surname of Riley
- Judge Riley (disambiguation), a disambiguation page for Judges with the surname of Riley
- Justice Riley (disambiguation), a disambiguation page for Justices with the surname of Riley
- Senator Riley (disambiguation), a disambiguation page for Senators with the surname of Riley
