= Reilly (surname) =

Reilly ( /ˈraɪli/) is an Irish surname (other forms include O'Reilly), and is derived from the Gaelic Ó Raghallaigh Sept that was based in Counties Cavan and Westmeath. Reilly is among the ten most frequently found surnames in Ireland and although they are very widespread they can be mostly found in the region of the ancestral homeland. The Riley spelling is an anglicised version and not found originally in Ireland.

== People ==
People with the surname Reilly include:

- Alan Reilly, Irish footballer
- Arch Reilly, American baseball player
- Brandon Reilly (American football), American football wide receiver
- Brandon Reilly (musician), frontman of the band "Nightmare of You"
- Brent Reilly, Australian rules footballer
- Charles Herbert Reilly, English architect
- Charles Nelson Reilly, American actor and director
- David Reilly, American singer
- Dianne Reilly, Australian politician
- Donald Reilly, American cartoonist
- Dorcas Reilly, American chef and inventor
- Edward Reilly (disambiguation), several people
- Frank Reilly (footballer) (1894–1956), Scottish footballer
- Frank J. Reilly, American illustrator and art educator
- Gary Reilly, Australian radio and television producer and writer
- Ginny Reilly, American folk singer
- Ike Reilly, American musician
- Jack Reilly (artist) (born 1950), American artist
- James Reilly (disambiguation), several people
- Jim Reilly, Irish drummer
- John Reilly (disambiguation), several people
- Kate Reilly (born 2001), Canadian ice hockey player
- Kelly Reilly, English actress
- Kevin Reilly (disambiguation), several people
- Lawrie Reilly, Scottish footballer
- Leonard Mackenzie Reilly, Canadian politician
- Liam Reilly (1955–2021), Irish singer
- Long John Reilly, American baseball player
- Maggie Reilly, Scottish singer
- Mal Reilly, English rugby league player
- Matthew Reilly, Australian author
- Mike Reilly (disambiguation), or Michael Reilly, several people
- Molly Reilly, Canadian aviator
- Paddy Reilly, Irish singer
- Patrick Reilly (baseball) (born 2001), American baseball player
- Pepe Reilly, American professional boxer
- Paul Reilly (disambiguation), several people
- Pauline Neura Reilly, Australian author and ornithologist
- Rebecca K Reilly, New Zealand author
- Rick Reilly, American sportswriter
- Robert D. Reilly Jr, American rear admiral
- Sean Reilly (disambiguation), several people
- Skip Reilly, American politician
- Sidney Reilly, a Russian-born adventurer and Secret Intelligence Service agent
- Terry Reilly (1947–2025), Australian archer
- Thomas Reilly (disambiguation), several people named Thomas, Tom and Tommy
- Tomás Francisco Reilly (1908–1992), American-born Catholic Bishop of San Juan de la Maguana, Dominican Republic
- Trevor Reilly (born 1988), American football player
- Vini Reilly, British post-punk musician
- William Reilly (disambiguation), several people
- Willie Reilly, Scottish boxer

== Fictional characters ==
- Ben Reilly, comic-book character in Marvel Comics
- Bernardo O'Reilly, one of the title characters of the film The Magnificent Seven
- Charlie Reilly, comic-book character in Chrononauts: Futureshock
- Danny Reilly, comic-book character in the Millarworld
- Ignatius J. Reilly, the protagonist of the 1980 novel A Confederacy of Dunces
- Kathy Reilly, comic-book character in Chrononauts: Futureshock
- May Parker (née Reilly), comic-book character in Marvel Comics
- Reilly, a soldier and supporting character of the Irish novel series Zom-B

== See also ==
- Reilley
- Rielly
- Reilly (disambiguation)
