= James Riley =

James Riley may refer to:

== Law and politics ==
- James M. Riley (politician), (1854-1913), American politician in New York
- James W. Riley (1875–1954), American politician in New York
- James B. Riley (1894–1958), American jurist in West Virginia

== Sports ==
- James Riley (cricketer) (1860–1937), English cricketer
- James Riley (footballer) (1880–1938), English association footballer
- Jack Riley (baseball) (James Riley, fl. 1940s), American baseball player
- James Riley (soccer) (born 1982), American soccer player

== Others ==
- James Riley (captain) (1777–1840), American merchant ship captain
- James McIlvaine Riley (1849–1911), American co-founder of the Sigma Nu fraternity
- James Whitcomb Riley (1849–1916), American writer and poet
- Doc Middleton (James M. Riley, 1851–1913), American outlaw and horse thief
- James Riley (gunman) (1853–?), American gunfighter
- James Frederic Riley (1912–1985), British physician, radiologist and cancer specialist
- James Riley (POW) (born c. 1972), American soldier captured in Iraq, see American POWs in the 2003 invasion of Iraq
- James Riley (writer) (born c. 1977), American novelist
- James J. Riley, American mechanical engineer

== Other uses ==
- James Whitcomb Riley (train)
- James Whitcomb Riley Hospital for Children, a children's hospital in Indianapolis, Indiana
- James Whitcomb Riley High School, a secondary school in South Bend, Indiana

== See also ==
- Jim Riley (disambiguation)
- James Reilly (disambiguation)
