= Joe Reilly =

Joe or Joseph Reilly could refer to:

- Joe Reilly (baseball) (1861–?), American professional second baseman
- Joe Reilly (American football) (1880–1951), American athlete and coach
- Joe Reilly (Australian footballer) (1916–2003), Australian athlete and coach
- Joseph M. Reilly (1927–2012), American politician
- Joseph John Reilly, professor of English
- Joseph R. Reilly, President of Seton Hall University

== See also ==
- Joe O'Reilly (disambiguation)
- Joe Riley (disambiguation)
