= EPY =

EPY, EPy, Epy, or Épy may refer to:

== People ==
- Epy Quizon (born 1973), Filipino actor, full name Jeffrey Smith Quizon
- Epy Drost (1945–1995), Dutch footballer, full name Eimert Drost
- Epy Guerrero (1942–2013), Dominican baseball scout, full name Epifanio Obdulio Guerrero
- Epy Kusnandar (1964–2025), Indonesian actor

== Other ==
- Épy, Picard language name for the commune of Épehy, France
- EPy, abbreviation for pyrrolic esters, part of the pyrrolizidine alkaloid mechanism of action
- Val-d'Épy, a commune in Bourgogne-Franche-Comté, France
- EPY, abbreviation for Ektachrome 64T, a type of Ektachrome
- EPY, American Securities Exchange symbol for Earlypay
- EPY, abbreviation for the Paraguayan Ethnobotany Project, organization which launched the Ethnobotany 2006 exhibition at the Botanical Garden and Zoo of Asunción
