= Henry Riley =

Henry Riley may refer to:

- Henry Riley (South Carolina politician), state legislator in South Carolina
- Henry Riley (scientist) (1797–1848), British surgeon and naturalist, co-discovered the Thecodontosaurus
- Henry Hiram Riley (1813–1888), lawyer, writer, and state senator in Michigan
- Henry Thomas Riley (1816–1878), English translator, lexicographer, and antiquary
- H. Chauncey Riley (1835–1904), missionary bishop

== See also ==
- Harry Riley (disambiguation)
- Henry Reilly, Northern Irish politician
- Henry J. Reilly (1881–1963), American soldier and journalist
