= Joe Riley =

Joe or Joseph Riley may refer to:

== People ==
- Joseph P. Riley Jr. (born 1943), American politician, Charleston mayor
- Joe Riley (artist) (1964–2007), American artist, special effects artist, SubGenius
- Joe Riley (ice hockey) (1923–1976), American ice hockey player
- Joseph Albert Riley (1869–1940), South Australian businessman
- Joseph Harvey Riley (1873–1941), American ornithologist, Smithsonian Institution
- Joe Riley (rugby) (1882–1950), British rugby league footballer and rugby union coach
- Joe Riley (footballer, born 1909) (1909-1982), English footballer, see List of AFC Bournemouth players
- Joe Riley (footballer, born 1928) (1928–1983), English football forward with Stockton and Darlington
- Joe Riley (footballer, born 1991), English retired football full back
- Joe Riley (footballer, born 1996), English football full back or midfielder

== Characters ==
- Joe Riley (One Life to Live) (Lee Patterson), in TV series One Life to Live (1968–2012)
- Joe Riley (James Dunn), in the movie The Golden Gloves Story (1951)
- Joe Riley (Eddie Quillan), in the movie Jungle Raiders (1945)

== See also ==
- Jo Riley (Josephine Riley), British writer, translator, actor, specialized in Chinese theatre
- Joe O'Reilly (disambiguation)
- Joe Reilly (disambiguation)
- Joseph P. Riley Jr. Park, a stadium in Charleston, South Carolina, U.S.
- Riley (surname), list of people with that surname
