= Marva Smalls =

Marva A. Smalls (born November 10, 1956), is an American businesswoman who is Executive Vice President of Public Affairs and Chief of Staff for Nickelodeon, based in South Carolina.

== Early life and education ==
Marva Smalls was born on November 10, 1956, and grew up in Florence, South Carolina. She is the middle child of five kids, which she says helped her to navigate different situations. She attended black public schools until the 9th grade.

Smalls participated in Girl Scouts. She was competitive as a kid and was valedictorian in kindergarten. Smalls was vice president and president in high school and joined the marching band and the drama club. She attended the University of South Carolina for college and majored in political science. Her freshmen year, she was a page in the State Senate. Smalls was a member of the Young Democrats during this time and started the first NAACP chapter on campus. She was awarded an Honorary Doctorate of Humanities and received both graduate and undergraduate degrees from the University of South Carolina. She has a Bachelors degree as well as a Master's degree for public administration.

== Career ==
Smalls worked as the Chief of Staff for Washington congressman Robin Tallon. This made her the first black Chief of Staff for a white congressman in the South. She then worked for the lieutenant governor's office in South Carolina, and shortly after for the governor of South Carolina, Dick Riley. In 1993, Smalls accepted an offer to join Nickelodeon with the intentions of going back to politics in the future. She became the head of public affairs and Chief of Staff for Nickelodeon. She connected with government officials and public advocates from Nickelodeon and has worked with multiple presidents and first ladies. Smalls was included in the British Prime Minister's state dinner where she was seated at the head table by President Obama.

Smalls launched the Ron McNair School for Aerospace Science at the University of South Carolina and is on the Medical University of South Carolina Foundation Board. She also serves on the college's Board of Visitors. She is a Corporate Director for the National Bank of South Carolina and a founding board member of the Florence, South Carolina Performing Arts Center. Smalls is the founder of the Marva Small Endowment.

Smalls was asked to launch a Viacom-wide diversity and inclusion effort by Viacom's corporate office. She wanted to stay with Nickelodeon, so turned it down. The Chairman of Viacom agreed to let Smalls stay at Nickelodeon and work for him at the same time, and so she agreed.

== Accomplishments and awards ==
Smalls served as president to the Big Brothers Big Sisters of New York, as she resides in both New York and South Carolina. She has donated over $3 million to programs that benefit children and families. Smalls received the 2025 ELC Achievement Award.
