= Daniel Riley =

Daniel Riley may refer to:

== Politicians ==
- Daniel Aloysius Riley (1916–1984), Canadian Member of Parliament from New Brunswick
- Daniel Edward Riley (1860–1948), Canadian Member of Parliament from Alberta
- B. Daniel Riley (1946–2016), British-born US politician in Maryland

== Others ==
- Daniel Riley, Australian entrepreneur, co-founder of Earlypay
- Daniel Riley (dancer) (born 1985 or 1986), Indigenous Australian dancer and choreographer
- Daniel Riley (filmmaker), Swedish UNICEF Goodwill Ambassador in 2022
- Daniel Riley (writer), American writer, author of the novel Fly Me (2017)

== See also ==
- Daniel Reilly (disambiguation)
