= Jack Riley =

Jack Riley may refer to:

- Jack Riley (actor) (1935–2016), American comedic character actor
- Jack Riley (American football) (1909–1993), American football offensive tackle
- Jack Riley (ice hockey, born 1910) (1910–1993), former National Hockey League player
- Jack Riley (ice hockey, born 1919) (1919–2016), former National Hockey League executive
- John P. Riley Jr. (1920–2016), known as Jack Riley, U.S. Military Academy ice hockey coach
- Jack Riley (cricketer) (1927–2008), English cricketer
- Jack Riley (rugby league), English professional rugby league footballer who played in the 1900s
- Jack Riley (baseball), American baseball player

== See also ==
- Jack Reilly (disambiguation)
- John Riley (disambiguation)
