= Railly =

Railly may refer to:

- Kathryn Railly, character in 12 Monkeys
- Cassie Railly, character in 12 Monkeys (TV series)

== See also ==
- Reilly (surname)
