= Charles O'Reilly =

Charles O'Reilly may refer to:

- Charles O'Reilly (Irish bishop) (died 1800), Irish Roman Catholic prelate, bishop of Kilmore
- Charles A. O'Reilly III (fl. 1960s–2020s), American professor of management
- Charles Joseph O'Reilly (1860–1923), Canadian-born American prelate, bishop of Lincoln, Nebraska

== See also ==
- Charles Reilly (disambiguation)
