= Kevin O'Reilly =

Kevin O'Reilly may refer to:

- Kevin O'Reilly (hurler)
- Kevin O'Reilly (politician)

== See also ==
- Kevin Reilly (disambiguation)
