= Senator Riley =

Senator Riley may refer to:

- Chuck Riley (politician) (born 1939), Oregon State Senate
- Dick Riley (died 2010), New Hampshire State Senate
- Edward F. Riley (1895–1990), Washington State Senate
- Henry Hiram Riley (1813–1888), Michigan State Senate
- James W. Riley (1875–1954), New York State Senate
- Nancy Riley (born 1958), Oklahoma State Senate
- Richard Riley (born 1933), South Carolina State Senate
- Tom Riley (Iowa politician) (1929–2011), Iowa State Senate

== See also ==
- Senator Reilly (disambiguation)
