= Peter Reilly =

Peter Reilly may refer to:

- Peter Reilly (politician) (1933–1977), Canadian politician, broadcaster and journalist
- Peter Reilly (rugby union) (born 1944), Australian rugby union player
- Peter Reilly murder case, American victim of miscarriage of justice in 1973
- Pete Reilly, Scottish guitarist of The View

== See also ==
- Peter Riley (disambiguation)
- Peter O'Reilly (disambiguation)
