= John Reilly =

John Reilly may refer to:

== Sports ==
- John Reilly (Australian footballer) (born 1942), former Australian rules footballer
- John Reilly (baseball) (1858–1937), American baseball player
- John Reilly (football coach), Irish football manager
- John Reilly (footballer, born 1962), Scottish former professional footballer
- John Reilly (runner) (born 1941), winner of the 1000 yards at the 1962 USA Indoor Track and Field Championships

== Politics and government ==
- John Reilly (Irish politician) (1745–1804), Irish MP
- John Reilly (judge) (born 1946), Canadian politician, activist and retired judge
- John Reilly (Michigan politician) (1958–2026), member of the Michigan House of Representatives
- John Reilly, North Carolina State Auditor, 1873–1877
- John Reilly (Pennsylvania politician) (1836–1904), U.S. Representative from Pennsylvania
- John B. Reilly (1870–1928), mayor of Miami
- John E. Reilly Jr. (1902–1963), American politician and judge
- John R. Reilly (1928–2008), adviser to Democratic presidential candidates

== Arts and entertainment ==
- John Reilly (painter) (1928–2010), English oil painter and potter
- John Reilly (actor, born 1934) (1934–2021), American actor
- John Reilly (singer) (1926–1969), Irish traveller and source singer
- John C. Reilly (born 1965), American actor

== See also ==
- John Reily (1763–1850), American pioneer
- Jack Reilly (disambiguation)
- John Riley (disambiguation)
