= John Riley =

John Riley may refer to:

== Arts and entertainment ==
- John Riley (painter) (1646–1691), British portrait painter
- John Riley (poet) (1937–1978), English poet associated with the British Poetry Revival
- John Bernard Riley (born 1954), jazz drummer

== Sports ==
- John Riley (Scottish footballer), Scottish footballer
- John Riley (rower) (born 1964), American rower
- John P. Riley Jr. (1920–2016), American ice hockey coach
- Jack Riley (American football) (John Horn Riley, 1909–1993), American wrestler who later turned to American football
- John Riley (rugby league), rugby league footballer of the 1900s
- John Riley (ice hockey), 1963–1966 head coach of Wisconsin Badgers men's ice hockey
- John Riley (motorcyclist), in the 1976 and 1977 Isle of Man TT
- John Riley (racing driver), in the 1965 and 1966 Tasman Series

== Other ==
- John Riley (botanist), founder of California Rare Fruit Growers
- John Riley (physicist) (born 1958), Defence scientist and former VFL and SANFL footballer
- John E. Riley (1909–2001), president of the Northwest Nazarene College
- John H. Riley (1947–1994), American attorney and railroad transportation administrator
- John J. Riley (1895–1962), American politician, U.S. Representative from South Carolina
- John Riley (soldier) (1805–1850), or John O'Riley, Irish-American soldier who defected from the US Army and formed the Saint Patrick's Battalion to fight for Mexico
- John Riley (mayor), mayor of Opa-Locka, Florida

== Other uses ==
- "John Riley" (song), a traditional English folk song

== See also ==
- John Phillip Rilley (1877–1950), landsman serving in the United States Navy during the Spanish–American War
- Johnny Riley, Australian rugby league player
- Jack Riley (disambiguation)
- John Reilly (disambiguation)
- John Gilmore Riley House, a historic home in Tallahassee, Florida
