= George Riley =

George Riley may refer to:

- George Riley (British Columbia politician) (1843–1916), Canadian merchant and Liberal politician
- George Riley (Nova Scotia politician) (1922–2002), member of the Nova Scotia House of Assembly
- George Riley (baseball) (1956–2023), Major League Baseball pitcher
- George R. Riley (1899–1983), World War I flying ace
- George Riley (broadcaster) (born 1978), British sports broadcaster
- George Riley (abolitionist) (1833–1905)

== Other names ==
- George Riley Dixon (1848-1912), American collegiate football player and lawyer

== See also ==
- George Reilly (born 1957), Scottish footballer
- George O'Reilly (1911–1992), Canadian politician
