= Mary Riley =

Mary Riley may refer to:

- Janet Mary Riley (1915–2008), American civil rights activist and law professor
- Mary Gine Riley (1883–1939), American painter
- Mary V. Riley (1908–1987), Apache tribal council member

== See also ==
- Mary Reilly (disambiguation)
