= Robert O'Reilly (disambiguation) =

Robert O'Reilly (born 1950) is an American film, television, and stage actor.

Robert O'Reilly may refer to:

- Robert Maitland O'Reilly (1845–1912), Surgeon General of the United States Army, 1902–1909
- Bob O'Reilly (born 1949), Australian rugby league footballer

== See also ==
- Robert Reilly (disambiguation)
