= Robert Reilly =

Robert Reilly may refer to:

- Robert Reilly (politician) (born c. 1939), member of the New York State Assembly
- Robert Reilly (footballer) (born 1959), former Scottish football midfielder
- Robert R. Reilly (born 1946), senior fellow at the American Foreign Policy Council
- Robert D. Reilly Jr., U.S. Navy officer

== See also ==
- Robert Reily (1820–1863), colonel of the 75th Ohio Infantry regiment in the Union Army
- Robert J. Reiley (1878–1961), American architect
- Robert Riley (disambiguation)
- Robert O'Reilly (disambiguation)
