= Joseph O'Reilly =

Joseph O'Reilly may refer to:

- Joe O'Reilly (born 1955), Irish politician
- Joe O'Reilly (footballer), Irish athlete

== See also ==
- Joseph Reilly (disambiguation)
- Joseph Riley (disambiguation)
