= Edward Riley =

Edward Riley may refer to:

- Edward Riley (pastoralist) (1784–1825), Australian settler
- Edward Riley (Australian politician) (1859–1943), member of the Australian House of Representatives
- Edward Charles Riley (1892–1969), Australian politician
- Edward F. Riley (1895–1990), American politician in the state of Washington
- Edward Riley (cricketer) (1895–1963), English cricketer and police officer
- Bud Riley (Edward J. Riley Jr., 1925–2012), American football coach
- Teddy Riley (Edward Theodore Riley, born 1967), American singer-songwriter

== See also ==
- Edward Reilly (disambiguation)
