= Jonathon Riley =

Jonathon Riley or Jonathan Riley may refer to:

- Jonathon Riley (British Army officer) (born 1955), British Army officer and military historian
- Jonathon Riley (runner) (born 1978), American middle- and long-distance runner
- Jonathan Riley (born 1955), American philosopher
- Jonathan Riley-Smith (1938–2016), British historian
