= Robert Riley =

Robert Riley may refer to:

- Bob Riley (born 1944), governor of Alabama from 2003 to 2011
- Bob Riley (race car designer) (fl. 2000s–2020s), sports car designer and founder of Riley Technologies
- Bob C. Riley (1924–1994), acting governor of Arkansas for 11 days in 1975
- Bob Riley (American football coach) (fl. 1960s–1970s), American football player and coach
- Bob Riley (offensive lineman) (born 1964), American football tackle
- Bobby Riley (born 1964), American football wide receiver
- Bob Riley (basketball) (born 1948), American basketball player
- Robert Christopher Riley (born 1980), American actor
- Rob Riley (Aboriginal activist) (1954–1996), Aboriginal activist advancing Indigenous issues in Australia
- Rob Riley (comic strip), British comic strip of the 1960s and 1970s
- Rob Riley (ice hockey) (born 1955), American ice hockey coach
- Robert Riley (mathematician) (died 2000), American mathematician

== See also ==
- Robert Reilly (disambiguation)
