= Michael Riley (disambiguation) =

Michael Riley (born 1962) is a Canadian actor.

Michael Riley may also refer to:

- Michael Riley (curler), Canadian curler
- Michael Riley (artist) (1960–2004), Indigenous Australian photographer and filmmaker
- Michael Riley (film producer), English film producer, producer of Chosen (2016)
- Michael Riley (Minnesota politician) (1874-1941), American farmer, businessman, and politician
- Michael H. Riley (born 1968), American motion graphics designer and art director
- Michael A. Riley, Capitol Police Officer convicted of obstruction of justice following the January 6th Capitol Attack

== See also ==
- Michael Reilly (disambiguation)
- Mike Riley (disambiguation)
