= Jack Reilly =

Jack Reilly may refer to:

- Jack Reilly (artist) (born 1950), American artist
- Jack Reilly (footballer) (born 1943), Australian football (soccer) player
- Jack Reilly (American football) (born 1946), American football player
- Jack Reilly (musician) (1932–2018), American pianist

== See also ==
- Jack Rieley (1942–2015), American record producer
- Jack Riley (disambiguation)
- John Reilly (disambiguation)
