= Daisy Group =

British IT service provider

Daisy Group Holdings Limited
- Trade name: Daisy
- Type: Private Limited company
- Industry: Information Technology
- Founded: 12 April 2001; 25 years ago
- Headquarters: Nelson, Lancashire, England, UK
- Key people: Matthew Riley; (Founder and Executive Chairman); Dave McGinn; (CEO)
- Divisions: Daisy Communications; Daisy Corporate Services
- Website: daisygroup.com

Daisy Group Holdings Limited, trading as Daisy Group or Daisy, is a British business-to-business (B2B) provider of IT, communications and cloud services to UK organisations. Today, Daisy Group has two operational divisions: Daisy Corporate Services and Daisy Communications. Their head office is in Nelson, Lancashire, England, and they also have a number of other offices throughout the UK, including Birmingham, Bristol, Farnborough, Glasgow, Horsham, Leeds, London, Manchester, Nottingham, Reading, Romford, Sevenoaks and Wakefield.

== History ==
The Daisy Group was founded in 2001 by Founder and Chairman Matthew Riley, who aimed to disrupt a monopolised business market and target an under-resourced business community with the benefit of being bound to no single network or supplier.

From a small start-up, the business experienced rapid organic growth and was named the fastest-growing technology business in the UK in the 2005 Sunday Times’ Tech Track.

In 2009, the business floated on the London Stock Exchange's Alternative Investment Market (AIM). In December 2014, Daisy once again became a private company in order to embark on its next stage of growth.

In May 2025, Daisy Group announced plans to merge with the business to business division of Virgin Media O2, subject to regulatory approval from the Competition and Markets Authority. The merger was completed in August 2025, creating a new company, O2 Daisy.

== Acquisitions ==
The following businesses (or certain assets from) were acquired by Daisy Group and integrated within their business:

- Vialtus, AT Communications (ATC), Eurotel, and Redstone (2009)
- Data and telecoms companies: BNS, Murphx, SpiriTel, Outsourcery, Telinet, Network Europe Group, and Worldwide (2010-2012)
- IT companies: Net Crowd, Indecs, Layer 3, and Daisy Data Centre (2013-2014)
- IT company Damovo UK and Managed Service Provider Phoenix IT Group (2015)
- Managed Services: Alternative Networks (2016)
- Cyber Security specialist: ECSC (2023)
