= Charles Riley (disambiguation) =

Charles Riley (1854–1929) was the first Anglican Archbishop of Perth, Western Australia.

Charles Riley may also refer to:

== People ==
- Charles Valentine Riley (1843–1895), British-born American entomologist and artist
- Charles Riley (bishop of Bendigo) (1888–1971), Anglican Bishop of Bendigo, son of the archbishop
- Charles Riley (politician), member of the New South Wales Legislative Council
- Charles Riley (priest) (1883–1972), Canadian Anglican priest
- Lil Buck (Charles Riley; born 1988), American dancer

== Places ==
- Charles Riley House, a historic house in Newton, Massachusetts

== See also ==
- Chuck Riley (disambiguation)
- Charles Reilly (disambiguation)
