= Alexander Riley =

Alexander or Alex Riley may refer to:

- Alexander Riley (merchant) (1778–1833), English merchant
- Alexander Riley (tracker) (1884–1970), Australian Aboriginal tracker
- Alex Riley (born 1981), American professional wrestler
- Alex Riley (comedian) (born 1968), English comedian
- Alex Riley (politician), American attorney and politician

== See also ==
- Alexandra Riley (born 1987), American-born New Zealand footballer
