= General Reilly =

General Reilly may refer to:

- James W. Reilly (1828–1905), Union Army brigadier general
- Jeremy Reilly (1934–2017), British Army lieutenant general
- William Edward Moyses Reilly (1827–1886), British Army major general

== See also ==
- General Riley (disambiguation)
