= Brett Riley =

Brett Riley may refer to:

- Brett Riley (writer) (born 1970), American writer
- Brett Riley (ice hockey) (born 1991), American ice hockey coach
