= Frank Reilly =

Frank Reilly may refer to:

- Frank J. Reilly (1906–1967), American painter, illustrator, muralist, and teacher
- Frank Reilly (footballer) (1894–1956), Scottish football centre half

== See also ==
- Frank Riley (disambiguation)
