= Daisy Health =

British telecommunications company

- Type: Private
- Industry: Telecommunications
- Founded: 1992; 34 years ago
- Headquarters: Nelson, Lancashire, United Kingdom
- Products: Telephony Solutions
- Revenue: £ 20 million
- Number of employees: 44
- Parent: Daisy Group
- Website: www.daisyhealthsolutions.com

Daisy Health (formerly Network Europe Group and Surgery Line) is a telecommunications company founded in 1992. It was acquired by Daisy Group in December 2010 for £23.5 million.

It supplies bespoke telephony solutions for GP’s and Dental Surgeries as well as corporate and government bodies. In 2007 it processed over 60 million telephone calls and supplies hardware and inbound telephone lines for approx 1500 UK surgeries.

== History ==
NEG was founded in 1992. The company started in a small converted broom cupboard in Brooks Mews, Mayfair, London supplying simple telephony solutions to small companies in London. The business grew organically and through the acquisition of Ension Technologies in 1999 (a Technology and Engineering focused business in Basildon) moved the headquarters from London to Essex. In 2000 the company become a Public Limited Company and changed its name to Network Europe Group plc.

In 2002 Network Europe sold its Least Cost Routing division Cable Telecom Europe Ltd to Cable Telecom (GB) Ltd prior to its purchase by Telstra Europe (European arm of the Australian government-owned Telco). In 2004 the founders Scott Russell and Nigel Butcher sold the business to the current managers through an MBO. It was the new management team that grew the business exponentially creating several new products and services including Surgery Line, a menu based telephony solution that addresses the problem of patient access. In 2009 it merged three core divisions, NEG Telecom Ltd, NEG Engineering and Network Europe Ltd into one company creating a £20 million per annum group.

== Market position ==
At the last count, NEG serves over 3,000 business customers 1,500 of which are GP and Dental Surgeries which account for approx 12 million patients using its services, apart from BT this makes NEG the largest supplier of patient access telephony in the UK.

== Controversy ==
The NEG Surgery Line service is based on "revenue share" 084 telephone number. This means a small percentage of the revenue created in delivering the call is taken from the incumbent provider and passed to the owner of the number. NEG has a contract in place that stipulates that all monies must be used to improve patient access by providing better telephony service. Public opinion of these numbers is mixed, as the perception of the service is that it cost more to call these numbers. In response to the outcome of a public consultation on the use of revenue share numbers in the NHS Health Secretary Mike O'Brien issued a statement on 14 September 2009 stating it is not the intention of the government to prohibit 'revenue sharing' as part of its proposals – the important thing is to ensure that patients are not being made to pay more than the equivalent cost of calling an 01 or 02 number. NEG has always maintained that their 084 Surgery Line numbers have never cost more to call than BT's standard local rate. It also proved that customers spend less time on the phone because of increased functionality coupled with the fact that Surgery Line is never engaged so patients are less likely to use "Ring Back" services which are considerably more expensive.

In April 2013, the Sunday Mirror's investigation into wait times of Daisy Surgery Lines found that the calls were not being picked up for a considerable length of time, but as the caller was connected, the call was being charged. The longest wait was 43 minutes, which would result in a £2.1 cost from a BT landline at 5p/min or from a mobile at 41p/min this would cost £17.63.
