= Ken Riley (disambiguation) =

Ken Riley (1947–2020) was an American football player.

Ken Riley may refer to:

- Kenneth Riley (painter) (1919–2015), American painter
- Ken Riley (priest) (1940–2025), English Anglican priest
- Ken Riley (physicist), English physicist
