= Edward Reilly =

Edward Reilly may refer to:

- Edward Reilly (Prince Edward Island politician) (c. 1839–1872), journalist and politician from Prince Edward island, Canada
- E. Albert Reilly (Edward Albert Reilly, 1868–?), New Brunswick politician
- Edward F. Reilly (1856–1890), New York politician
- Edward F. Reilly Jr. (born 1937), Kansas politician
- Edward J. Reilly (1905–1953), American politician in the state of Washington
- Edward R. Reilly (born 1949), Maryland politician

== See also ==
- Edward O'Reilly (disambiguation)
- Edward Riley (disambiguation)
