= Senator Reilly =

Senator Reilly may refer to:

- Edward F. Reilly (1856–1890), New York State Senate
- Edward R. Reilly (born 1949), Maryland State Senate
- Kathryn Reilly (born 1988), Senate of Ireland

== See also ==
- Senator O'Reilly (disambiguation)
- Senator Riley (disambiguation)
- Tom Rielly (born 1966), Iowa State Senate
