= Mary Reilly =

Mary Reilly may refer to:

- Mary Reilly (novel), a 1990 novel by Valerie Martin
- Mary Reilly (film), a 1996 film based on the novel
- Mary Reilly (academic), an Irish neurologist
- Mary Reilly (advocate) (born 1930), a Catholic teacher, leader, advocate, and Sister of Mercy from South Providence, Rhode Island
- Mary McMullen (1920–1986), pseudonym for author Mary Reilly

== See also ==
- Mary Riley (disambiguation)
