= Norman Riley =

Norman Riley may refer to:

- Norman Riley (cricketer) (1894–1960), Australian cricketer
- Norman Riley (professor), English professor
- Norman Riley (rugby union), South African international rugby union player
- Norman Denbigh Riley (1890–1979), British entomologist

== See also ==
- Norma Riley, American electrical engineer
