= Senator O'Reilly =

Senator O'Reilly may refer to:

- Joe O'Reilly (born 1955), Senate of Ireland
- Patrick O'Reilly (Longford politician) (1911–2003), Senate of Ireland
- Pauline O'Reilly (fl. 2010s–2020s), Senate of Ireland
- Patrick O'Reilly (Cavan politician) (1927–1994), Senate of Ireland

== See also ==
- Senator Reilly (disambiguation)
