= Slippery Rock University =

Public university in Slippery Rock, Pennsylvania, US

Coordinates: 41.062°N 80.043°W

Slippery Rock University of Pennsylvania
- Other name: The Rock
- Former names: Slippery Rock Normal School (1889–1927); Slippery Rock State Teachers College (1927–1960); Slippery Rock State College (1960–1983)
- Type: Public university
- Established: 1889; 137 years ago
- Academic affiliations: PASSHE
- President: Karen Riley
- Administrative staff: 560
- Students: 8,625 (fall 2025)
- Undergraduates: 7,088 (fall 2025)
- Postgraduates: 1,537 (fall 2025)
- Location: Slippery Rock, Pennsylvania, U.S.
- Campus: 660 acres; Rural
- Colors
- Sporting affiliations: NCAA Division II; PSAC
- Mascot: Rocky – The Pride of the Rock
- Website: sru.edu
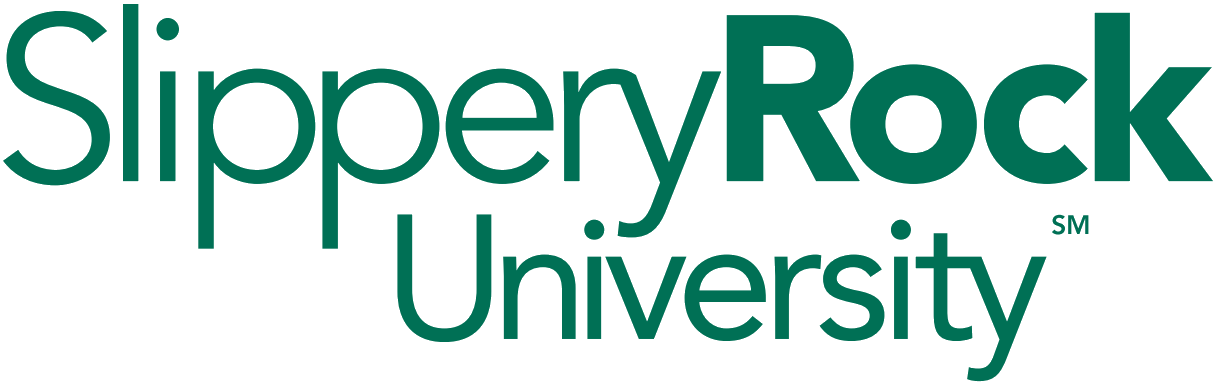

Slippery Rock University, formally Slippery Rock University of Pennsylvania (The Rock or SRU), is a public university in the Slippery Rock, Pennsylvania area of the United States. SRU is a member of the Pennsylvania State System of Higher Education (PASSHE). The university has been coeducational since its founding in 1889. SRU is fully accredited by the Middle State Commission on Higher Learning.

As of fall 2025, SRU's total enrollment was 8,625, including 7,088 undergraduates and 1,537 graduate students. There were also more than 946 employees, including 386 full-time faculty and a 21:1 student-to-faculty ratio.

== History ==
Slippery Rock University was founded in 1889 under the name "Slippery Rock State Normal School" as a teacher training school. James E. Morrow was the first president. The school was purchased by the Commonwealth in 1926 and became a four-year college.

"Slippery Rock State College" was established in 1960 and issued undergraduate and graduate degrees within the liberal arts and other professions. From 1960 to 1971, enrollment rose from 1,314 to 6,020 students, before eclipsing 7,000 in 1988 and 8,000 in 2005.

"Slippery Rock University of Pennsylvania" became the school's current and formal name on July 1, 1983, when Act 188 went into effect to establish Pennsylvania's State System of Higher Education, and converted 12 state-owned colleges into universities.

In November of 2025, the university’s College of Business was renamed The Haverlack College of Business after Elliott Haverlack, a graduate of the class of 1980. This came after a historic $5 million gift from Haverlack to the university.

== Campus ==
The majority of the campus, including the census-designated place, is in Slippery Rock Township. A portion of the university property to the west is in Slippery Rock Borough.

== Academics ==
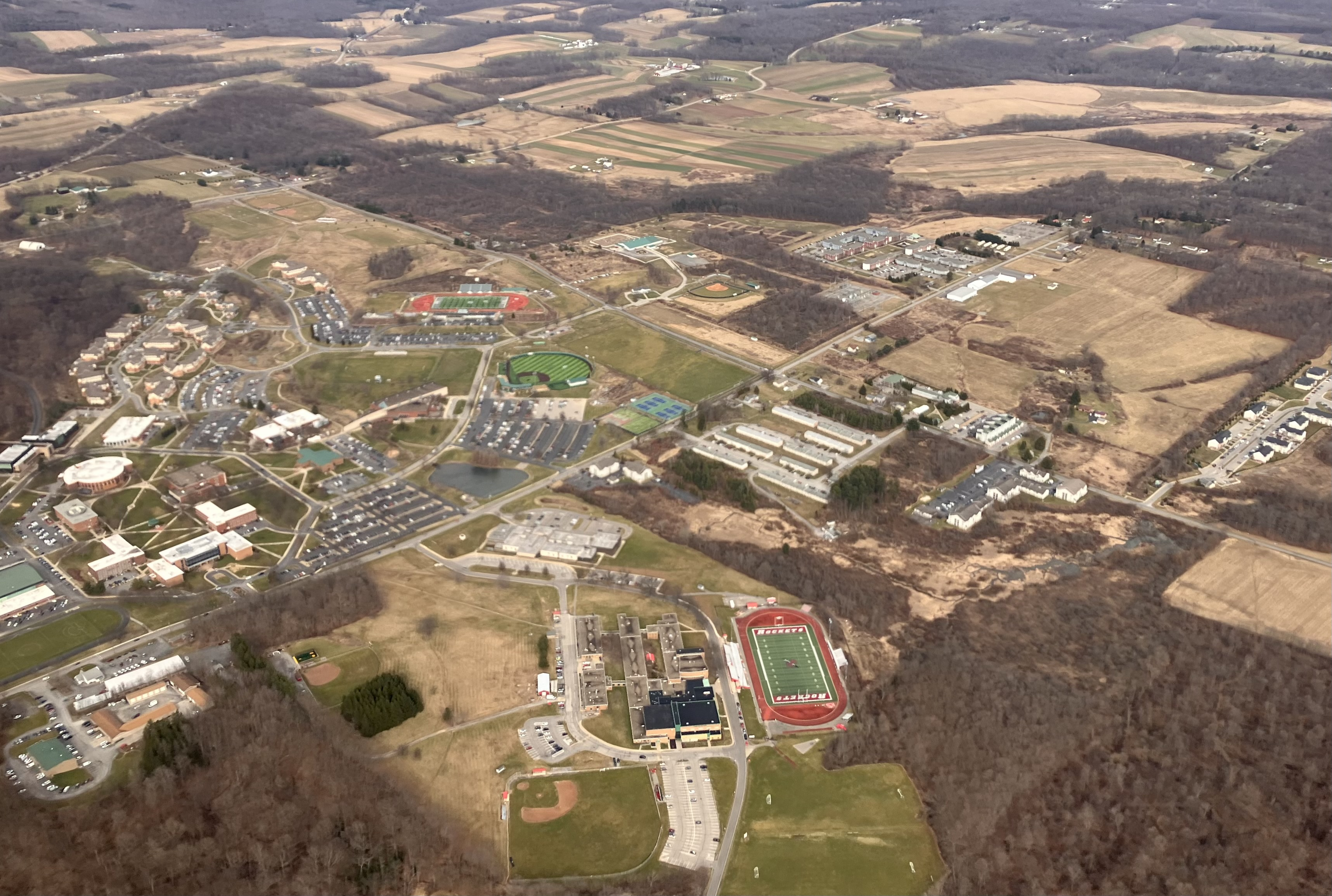
The campus of Slippery Rock University

SRU offers more than 150 undergraduate majors and 40 graduate degree programs and certificates across the following five colleges:

- Haverlack College of Business
- College of Education
- College of Engineering and Science
- College of Health Professions
- College of Liberal Arts

SRU offers 51 programs that hold national accreditations and 92% of faculty members holding a Ph.D. or other terminal degree.

SRU was ranked by U.S. News & World Report on its list of "Best Regional Universities - North" and "Top Public Schools – Regional Universities (North)." SRU has earned a spot on the U.S. News' Best Regional Universities 17 straight years. The Princeton Review also recognized SRU on its "Best Mid-Atlantic" list.

== Administration ==
Karen Riley took office in 2023. William J. Behre served from 2018 to 2022. Cheryl Joy Norton, the university's first female president, was in office from 2012 to 2017. The university’s first president, then known as the principal, was James E. Morrow who served from 1889-1890.

SRU is governed by a 20-member Board of Governors, a 12-member Council of Trustees, and the president with their cabinet providing advice and counsel on matters of policy, procedure, and strategic planning.

== Athletics ==
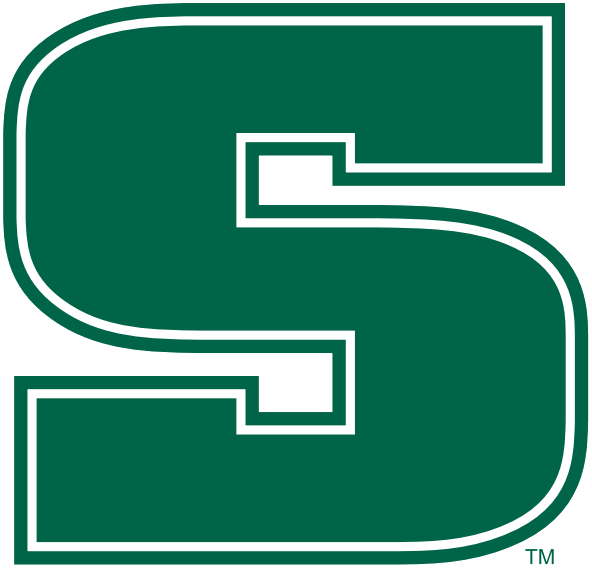
SRU's athletics logo

Slippery Rock University of Pennsylvania competes in the NCAA Division II and is a member of the Pennsylvania State Athletic Conference (PSAC).

Slippery Rock University's official mascot is Rocky the Lion.

=== Varsity sports ===
Men's teams: Baseball, basketball, cross country, football, soccer, indoor track & field, and outdoor track & field

Women's teams: Basketball, cross country, field hockey, lacrosse, soccer, softball, tennis, indoor track & field, outdoor track & field, and volleyball

In December 2025, the university announced that women's flag football and wrestling will begin competing as varsity sports for the start of the 2027-28 academic year. Wrestling was reinstated after the program was discontinued in 2006.

The announcement of Slippery Rock's football scores is a tradition at Michigan football games, started in 1959 by Michigan Stadium's public address announcer Steve Filipiak. The tradition spread to other stadiums as well—during a 1970 game at the University of Texas, the announcer failed to read Slippery Rock’s score, which resulted in the crowd demanding to know said score.

=== Club sports ===
In 1995, the women's water polo team won the intercollegiate national championship conducted by USA Water Polo.

In 1987, the women's judo team, a varsity sport team at the time, won the intercollegiate national championship conducted by the National Collegiate Judo Association.

Slippery Rock ice hockey joined other colleges and universities in the region to form the College Hockey Mid-America (CHMA) in 2006. In 2020, the university suspended the hockey program, before returning in 2025.

Slippery Rock men's rugby won the 2024 7s rugby National Championship at the Collegiate Rugby Championship in Washington, D.C. on April 27, 2024.

== Student life ==
=== Clubs and organizations ===
SRU offers 160 clubs and organizations for its student body, featuring on-and-off campus outings and events and allowing students to make connections with one another through shared interests and experiences.

=== Aebersold Student Recreation Center ===
The Aebersold Student Recreation Center is an 82,000-square-foot (7,600 m^{2}) on-campus student recreation center.

=== Student media ===
SRU has a student newspaper called The Rocket, the radio station 88.1 WSRU-FM, and the literary magazine SLAB.

== Demographics ==
Undergraduate demographics as of Fall 2023
Race and ethnicity	Total
White	84%
Hispanic	4%
International student	3%
Two or more races	3%
American Indian/Alaska Native	1%
Black	1%
Unknown	1%
Economic diversity
Low-income (Note: The percentage of students who received an income-based federal Pell grant intended for low-income students.)	29%
Affluent (Note: The percentage of students who are a part of the American middle class at the bare minimum.)	71%

== Notable alumni ==
- Matt Adams – baseball player
- Janet Anderson – golfer
- Cheryl Bailey – commissioner of National Women's Soccer League
- Francis V. Barnes – Secretary of Education for the Commonwealth of Pennsylvania from 2004 to 2005
- Sharif Bey ('98) - sculptor, ceramicist, and professor of studio art, Syracuse University
- Stephen Bolles – lawyer and politician
- Myron Brown – basketball player
- Todd Tamanend Clark (1983) – poet and composer
- Matthew Driscoll ('92) – basketball coach
- Stanley Dziedzic ('72) – wrestler
- Michael J. Estocin – Medal of Honor recipient
- Brandon Fusco – football player
- Wes Hills – football player
- Greg Hopkins – football player
- Donnie Iris – musician
- Charles William Kerr – pastor
- Jodi Kest – basketball coach
- Matt Kinsinger – football player
- Gary L. Lancaster – U.S. District Judge for the Western District of Pennsylvania
- Alan Morrison - Politician
- Greg Paterra – football player
- Sarah Patterson – gymnastics coach
- Lawrence Reed – president of the Foundation for Economic Education
- M. Richard Rose (1955-2021) – former President of Alfred University and the Rochester Institute of Technology
- Richard Schweiker – politician
- Robert J. Stevens – chief executive officer of the Lockheed Martin Corporation
- C. Vivian Stringer – basketball coach
- John Stuper – baseball player and college baseball coach
- Lou Trivino – baseball player
- Royce Waltman – basketball coach
