= Seneca Observer =

- Type: Weekly newspaper
- Founded: 1832
- Ceased publication: 1849
- Language: English
- Headquarters: New York
- Country: U.S.

The Seneca Observer was a weekly newspaper covering Seneca, New York, and Waterloo, New York, from 1832 until 1849. Charles Sentell was the publisher. The Library of Congress has preserved volumes of the newspaper on microfilm.

Publishers were Charles Sentell in 1833, James C. Wood from 1834–1835, H. H. Riley from 1837–1838, Guild & Tobey in 1839, Wood, Riley & Knox from 1839–1840, Charles Sentell from 1841–1844, S. Pew & F.A. Marsh in 1844, and H.H. Riley in 1846. Riley also served as the paper's editor.

It was one of several papers established in the area during the first half of the 19th century and was initially established as the Waterloo Observer from 1828 until 1832. For a time, it was known as the Daily Seneca Observer. It was succeeded by the Seneca Free Soil Union from 1848-1849 and the Seneca Observer & Union from 1849 - 1850 after merging with the Free Soil Union.

The Seneca Falls Democrat was the paper's rival. The Observer advocated for women's suffrage.
