= Steve Riley =

Steve Riley may refer to:

- Steve Riley (drummer) (1956-2023), American heavy metal drummer for W.A.S.P. and L.A. Guns
- Steve Riley (American football) (1952–2021), American football player
- Steve Riley (politician) (born 1958), American politician
- Steve Riley, accordionist, singer, and leader of the Cajun band Steve Riley and the Mamou Playboys
- Steve Riley, character in the comic strip Foxtrot

== See also ==
- Steven Riley, professor of infectious disease dynamics
