= William Reilly =

William Reilly may refer to:

- William K. Reilly (born 1940), Environmental Protection Agency administrator
- William L. Reilly (1916–2009), American Jesuit and academic
- William J. Reilly (1899–1970), American economist
- William Edward Moyses Reilly (1827–1886), British Army general
- William Arthur Reilly (1903–1969), American political figure from Boston
- Bill Reilly (William Francis Reilly, 1938–2008), American publishing and media executive
- Bill Reilly (runner) (William L. Reilly, born 1943), American steeplechase runner
- Will Reilly (born 2002), American soccer player
- Will Reilly (ice hockey) (born 1997), Canadian ice hockey player
- William K. Reilly, pseudonym used by English writer John Creasey (1908–1973)

== See also ==
- William Riley (disambiguation)
- William O'Reilly (disambiguation)
