= Harold Riley =

Harold Riley may refer to:

- Harold William Hounsfield Riley (1877–1946), member of the Legislative Assembly of Alberta
- Harold Riley (artist) (1934–2023), English artist
- Harold Riley (footballer) (1909–1982), English footballer
- Harold Riley (cricketer) (1902–1989), English cricketer

== See also ==
- Harry Riley (disambiguation)
