= Richard Riley (disambiguation) =

Richard Riley (born 1933) is an American politician.

Richard Riley may also refer to:

- Rich Riley (born 1973), American entrepreneur
- Richard Riley (footballer), English footballer
- Richie Riley (born 1983), American basketball coach

== See also ==
- Dick Riley (died 2010), American gun shop owner, state senator and president of the NRA
