= William Riley =

William, Bill, Billy, or Willie Riley may refer to:

== Sports ==
- William Riley (Nottinghamshire cricketer) (1888–1917)
- William Riley (Leicestershire cricketer) (1892–1955)
- Bill Riley (ice hockey, born 1921) (1921–2000), American ice hockey player
- Bill Riley (ice hockey, born 1950) (1950–2026), Canadian ice hockey player
- Bill Riley Jr., American ice hockey player and coach
- Billy Riley (1889–1977), English professional wrestler, coach, promoter, and referee
- Billy Riley (baseball) (1855–1887), outfielder in Major League Baseball

== Arts and entertainment ==
- Willie Riley (1866–1961), British author
- William K. Riley, one of the pen names of British author John Creasey (1908–1973)
- Bill Riley Sr. (1920–2006), American entertainer
- Billy Lee Riley (1933–2009), American musician

== Other ==
- William Riley (architect) (1852–1937), British architect
- William J. Riley (1947–2023), United States federal judge
- William F. Riley (judge) (1884–1956), United States federal judge
- William F. Riley (engineer) (1925–2000), American engineer and academic
- William Harrison Riley (1835–1907), British socialist
- William Bell Riley (1861–1947), American religious leader
- William Riley (criminal), a.k.a. "Mush" Riley, American saloon keeper and underworld figure
- William E. Riley (1897–1970), American general

== See also ==
- William Reilly (disambiguation)
- Riley (surname)
- William O'Reilly (disambiguation)
