= Mike Reilly =

Mike or Michael Reilly may refer to:

== Politics ==
- Michael Reilly (Wisconsin politician) (1869–1944), member of the U.S. House of Representatives from Wisconsin's 6th district
- Michael Reilly (New York politician) (born 1973), member of the New York State Assembly for the 62nd District

== Sports ==
=== Gridiron football ===
- Mike Reilly (1960s linebacker) (1942–2019), American football linebacker
- Mike Reilly (1980s linebacker) (born 1959), American football linebacker
- Michael Reilly (quarterback) (born 1985), American gridiron football quarterback
- Mike Reilly (coach) (1899–1971), American football, basketball, and baseball player and coach

=== Other sports ===
- Mike Reilly (umpire) (born 1949), Major League Baseball umpire
- Mike Reilly (golfer) (born 1968), American professional golfer
- Mike Reilly (ice hockey) (born 1993), American ice hockey defenseman

== Other ==
- Mike Reilly (television personality)
- Michael Reilly (character), a character in the Australian police drama Water Rats

== See also ==
- Mike Riley (disambiguation)
- Michael Riley (disambiguation)
