= Shawn Reilly =

Shawn Reilly may refer to:

- Shawn Reilly (politician)
- Shawn Reilly, editor of the Chilton Times-Journal
- Shawn Reilly (baseball) of the Rockland Boulders

== See also ==
- Sean Reilly (disambiguation)
- Sean Riley (disambiguation)
