= Daniel Reilly =

Daniel Reilly may refer to:

- Daniel P. Reilly (born 1989), American politician in Rhode Island
- Daniel Patrick Reilly (1928–2024), American prelate of the Roman Catholic Church

== See also ==
- Daniel Riley (disambiguation)
