= Jake Riley (disambiguation) =

Jake Riley is an American long-distance runner.

Jake Riley may also refer to:

- Jake Riley, musician in L.T.D. (band)
- Jake Riley (ice hockey), represented Australia at the 2016 Winter Youth Olympics
- Jake Riley, fictional character in Three Sisters (TV series)
- Jake Riley, fictional character in Containment (TV series)
