= Reilley =

Reilley is both a surname and a given name. Notable people with the name include:

Surname:

- Charlie Reilley (1856–1904), American baseball player
- Duke Reilley (1884–1968), American baseball player
- Hugh Reilley (1918–1940), Canadian World War II pilot
- Thomas T. Reilley (1883–1940), American football coach

Given name:

- Reilley Rankin (born 1979), American golfer

== See also ==
- Reilly (disambiguation)
- Riley (disambiguation)
