= Sean Reilly =

Sean Reilly may refer to:

- Sean Reilly (The Last Templar)
- Sean Reilly, character in Connor: Spotlight

== See also ==
- Shawn Reilly (disambiguation)
- Sean Riley (disambiguation)
