= Peter Riley (disambiguation) =

Peter Riley (born 1940) is an English writer.

Peter Riley may also refer to:

- Pete Riley (born 1969), English musician
- Peter Riley, character in Hearts in Atlantis

== See also ==
- Peter Reilly (disambiguation)
