= John Riley (Scottish footballer) =

Scottish footballer

Personal information
- Full name: John J. Riley
- Place of birth: Scotland
- Position(s): Wing half; full back

Senior career*
Years	Team	Apps	(Gls)
1906–1911	Queen's Park	68	(1)
1911	Morton	2	(0)
1911	St Mirren		
1911	Hamilton Academical	2	(0)
- * Club domestic league appearances and goals

John J. Riley was a Scottish amateur footballer who played as a wing half in the Scottish League for Queen's Park, Morton and Hamilton Academical.

== Personal life ==
Riley served as a private in the motor transport section of the Royal Army Service Corps during the First World War.
