= Justice Riley =

Justice Riley may refer to:

- Dorothy Comstock Riley (1924–2004), associate justice of the Michigan Supreme Court
- Fletcher Riley (1893–1966), associate justice of the Oklahoma Supreme Court
- James B. Riley (1894–1958), associate justice of the Supreme Court of Appeals of West Virginia

== See also ==
- Judge Riley
