= David Riley =

David Riley may refer to:

- Dave Riley (1960–2019), American musician
- David Riley (American football) (born 1967)
- David Riley (basketball) (born 1988)
- David Riley (footballer) (born 1960), English soccer player
- David Riley (politician) (died 1901), American politician and physician
- David Ryley, member of the band Fudge Tunnel
