= Joseph R. Reilly =

American academic administrator

22nd President of Seton Hall University
- Incumbent
- Assumed office July 1, 2024
- Preceded by: Katia Passerini (interim)

Personal details
- Born: Mountainside, New Jersey, U.S.
- Education: Seton Hall University (BA); Pontifical Gregorian University (STB); Fordham University (PhD)

Joseph Richard Reilly is an American Catholic priest and academic administrator who has served as the 22nd president of Seton Hall University since July 2024.

== Early life and education ==
Reilly was born in Mountainside, New Jersey. He received his early education from Seton Hall Preparatory School. Later, he earned a bachelor’s degree in psychology from Seton Hall University in 1987. In 1991, he was ordained a Catholic priest for the Archdiocese of Newark.

Reilly completed advanced theological studies in Rome and holds a Bachelor of Sacred Theology from the Pontifical Gregorian University and a Licentiate in Sacred Theology from the Pontificio Istituto Teresianum. In 2004, he earned a Ph.D. in educational administration from Fordham University.

== Career ==
After serving as a parochial vicar at St. Paul in Ramsey and St. Andrew in Bayonne, Reilly joined Seton Hall Preparatory School in 1995 as a theology teacher and chaplain. In 2002, he was appointed rector of St. Andrew’s Hall, the undergraduate seminary at Seton Hall University. In 2012, he was appointed Rector and Dean of the Immaculate Conception Seminary School of Theology, a position he held until 2022. After a one-year sabbatical, he served as Vice Provost of Academics and Catholic Identity.

On April 2, 2024, Reilly was named the university’s 22nd president, assuming office on July 1, 2024. His appointment represented a return to the university's tradition of leadership by a priest.

Reilly has served on several boards for the Archdiocese of Newark, including the Priest Personnel Board, the Advisory Committee on Continuing Education and Ongoing Formation of Priests, and the Archdiocesan Vocations Board. He has also been a member of the Board of Trustees for Seton Hall University. For the United States Conference of Catholic Bishops, he has served on the Faithful Citizenship Strategy Committee and the Catholic Social Teaching Task Force.

== Research ==
Reilly's academic work focuses on Catholic education and youth formation. His 2004 dissertation, "The phenomenology of service: A study of the effect of service on male adolescent development," examined the role of service experiences in adolescent identity formation.

== Awards and honors ==
In 2005, Pope John Paul II named him a Chaplain of His Holiness, granting him the title of Monsignor. In 2015, Pope Francis selected him as a Missionary of Mercy for the Holy Year of Mercy. That same year, the Irish Voice named him to its annual Irish Education 100 list.
