= Paul Reilly =

Paul Reilly may refer to:

- Paul Reilly, Baron Reilly (1912–1990), British designer
- Paul Reilly (computer scientist), pioneer of virtual archaeology and data visualisation in archaeology
- Paul Reilly (rugby league) (born 1976), British rugby league player
- Paul C. Reilly (1890–1984), American architect (father of Paul Waldron Reilly)
- Paul F. Reilly, Judge of the Wisconsin Court of Appeals
- Paul Waldron Reilly (1932–2011), American architect (son of Paul C. Reilly)

== See also ==
- Paul Riley (disambiguation)
