= George Putnam Riley =

American abolitionist and activist (1833–1905)

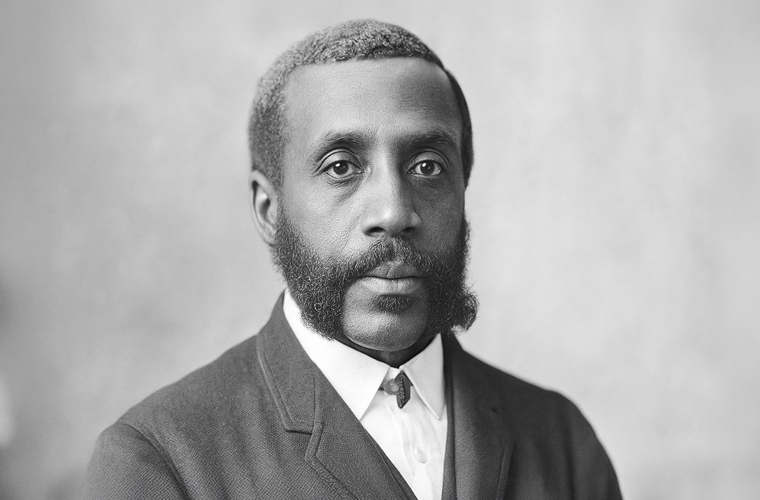
A photo of George P. Riley.

George Putnam Riley (March 29, 1833 in Boston – October 1, 1905) was an African-American abolitionist in the United States. He was referred to as the "Fred Douglass of Oregon" by the Oregonian newspaper.

== Life and career ==
George Putnam Riley (Geo P. Riley) was a native of Boston born on March 29, 1833. His grandfather was a participant in the Revolutionary War. Riley's father was engaged in the clothing trade in Boston. His parents, William and Elizabeth Riley, were abolitionists. Riley had several siblings, including half-brother James Jackson Jr, half-sisters Jeanette and Sarah Rebecca Jackson through his mother’s first marriage, and brother William Riley and sister Eliza Diana Riley. When Riley was a baby, his six-year-old half-brother James Jackson Jr. died.

Riley was prevented from attending college because he was black. He worked at Benjamin Butler's law office, and later as a barber. Riley moved to San Francisco in the historic California Gold Rush, and later moved back to Boston. Harriet Elizabeth Gordon and he wed on April 30, 1866 in Chelsea, Massachusetts. They had a daughter Bonita Louise Riley in 1867.

Riley moved to Oregon by early 1869. In Portland, he was employed by the federal customs department. He continued work as a barber.

Dec 15, 1869, Riley and 10 black men, three black women and two white men, organized the Workingmen's Joint Stock Association (WJSA) Corporation in Portland, Oregon. Original corporation member names are: William B. Brown, Mary H. Carr, John Donaldson (white), Philip J. Francis, Charles Gilbert, James H. Givens, Mary A. Givens, Charles H. Howard, John Huntington (white), George B. Luviney, George P. Riley, Anna Perry (Rodney), Edward S. Simmons, George R. Thomas, George Washington. Riley was president of the WJSA. They bought property in Seattle (20 acres) and Tacoma (67 acres) on speculation in 1870. The land was under litigation at the time of his death, where it had been under litigation for more than 20 years.

In 1887 he moved to Tacoma, Washington, where he continued work as a barber on the corner of 11th St (now S 11th St) and O St (now S Cushman Ave). While living in Tacoma, he orated Tacoma's Annual Emancipation Day festivities, and worked to resolve legal disputes relating to the properties belonging to WJSA in Tacoma and Seattle.

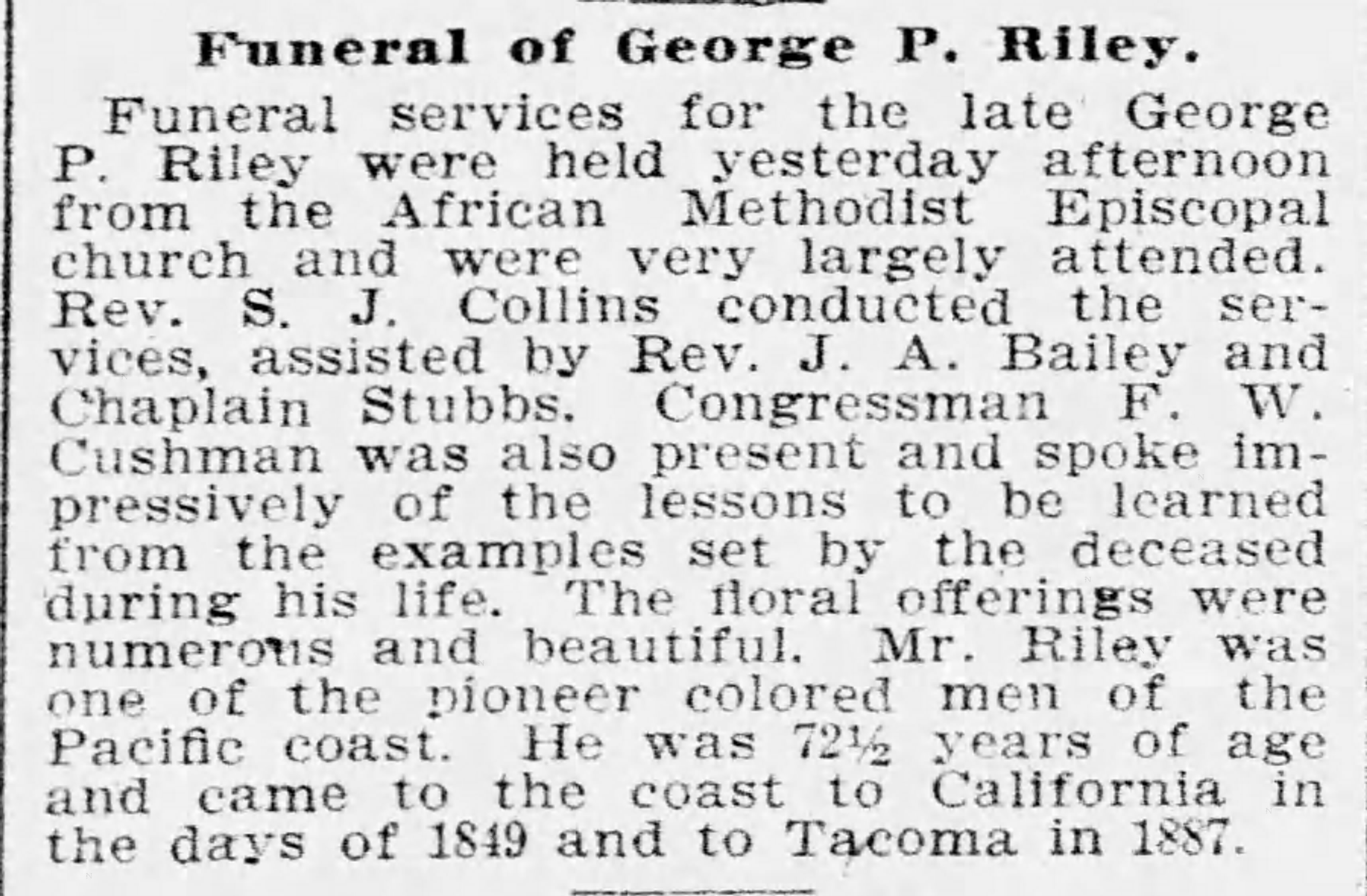
Newspaper clipping of George P. Riley funeral

Harriet Elizabeth Riley died Sept 18, 1896, and George Riley died on at his home 1706 S 11th St, Tacoma, WA on October 1, 1905. Congressman F.W. Cushman attended his funeral and spoke about the lessons learned from Riley's life.

== Politics ==
Riley was a Republican, described as, "the ablest orator among the Republicans of Multnomah County." He was a candidate for legislature, but did not win. In a "card" published in an Oregon newspaper Riley writes:

Portland, May 14, 1878 Editor Standard: -Noticing an article in your paper requesting me to reply to a question as to why I was not indorsed [sic] by the Republican Convention, or rather a clique who assume to be dictators of the party, I have only to remark that while they admit I have the ability, they discarded me on account of color. - Geo. Putnam Riley.

== Legacy ==
Riley had one daughter, Bonita Louise Riley Wright, mother of George Augustus Wright, possibly the first black child born in Tacoma, WA in 1889. She was a founding member of the Seattle NAACP in 1913.

In 2004, a housing and commercial development group in Seattle was named in honor of George Putnam Riley. The company has taken its roots since 1983 as a result of the activities of African American businessmen followers of Riley.

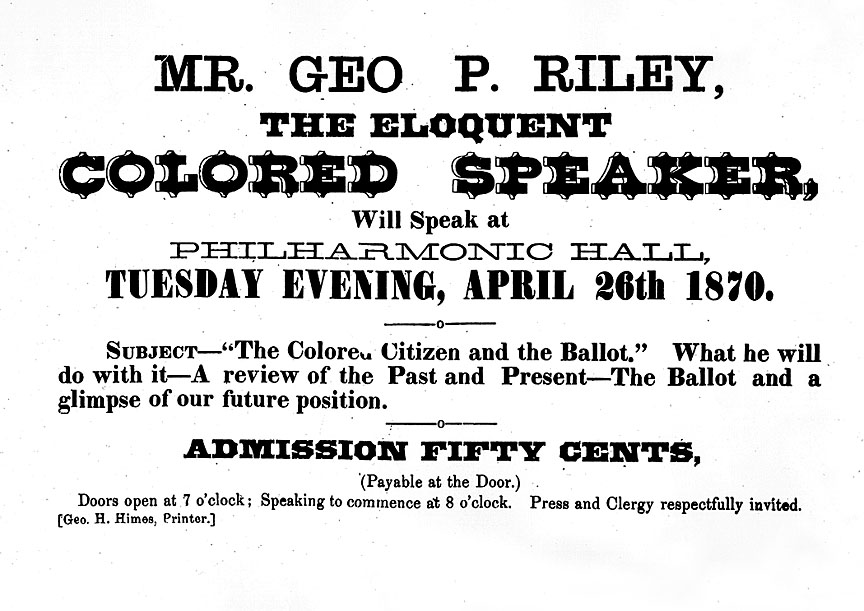
Announcement for the speech "The Colored Citizen and the Ballot" given by Riley.

== Speeches ==
- 1870, April 7, "The Ratification Jubilee", Portland, Oregon
- 1870, April 26, "The Colored Citizen and the Ballot", Portland, Oregon
- 1871, February 7, "Toussaint L'Ouverture, the Hero of San Domingo", Salem, Oregon
