= Sean Riley =

Sean or Shaun Riley may refer to:

- Sean Riley (wide receiver, born 1974), American football player
- Sean Riley (wide receiver, born 1997), American football player
- Sean Riley (Coronation Street)
- Sean Riley & The Slowriders, a Portuguese band
- Sean Riley (playwright), playwright from South Australia
- Sean Riley, host of World's Toughest Fixes
- Sean Riley, a fictional character, father of Peyton Riley
- Shawn Riley, musician in Rumpelstiltskin Grinder
- Shaun Riley, protagonist in Shaun of the Dead, played by Simon Pegg

== See also ==
- Sean Reilly (disambiguation)
- Shawn Reilly (disambiguation)
