= Isaac Riley (disambiguation) =

Isaac Riley was a Canadian politician.

Isaac Riley may also refer to:

- Isaac Woodbridge Riley, academic
- Isaac Riley, character in B.F.'s Daughter
