= Joseph John Reilly =

Literary critic

Joseph John Reilly (1881–1951) was Professor of English at Hunter College.
