= Peter O'Reilly =

Peter O'Reilly may refer to:

- Peter O'Reilly (civil servant) (1827–1905), settler and official in the Colony of British Columbia
- Peter Joseph O'Reilly (1850–1923), Irish-born Catholic bishop in the United States
- Peter O'Reilly (hurler) (1902–1940), Irish hurler
- Peter O'Reilly (Gaelic footballer) (1916–1994), Irish Gaelic football manager, coach and player
- Peter O'Reilly (cricketer) (born 1964), Irish sports journalist and former cricketer
