= Sally Riley =

Sally Riley may refer to:

- Sally Riley (footballer) (born 1990), Australian rules footballer
- Sally Riley (producer) (active 1990s – present), Australian filmmaker and media executive
