= Brian Riley =

Brian Riley may refer to:

- Brian Riley (footballer) (1937–2017), English footballer for Bolton Wanderers
- Brian Riley (ice hockey) (born 1959), American ice hockey player and coach
- Brian Riley (politician), American politician in Missouri
- Brian Riley (rugby league), New Zealand player

== See also ==
- Brian Reilly (1901–1991), Irish chess master
