= Harry Riley (disambiguation) =

Harry Riley was a cricketer.

Harry Riley may also refer to:

- Harry Riley (footballer)
- Harry B. Riley, California State Controller

== See also ==
- Harold Riley (disambiguation)
- Henry Riley (disambiguation)
