= Howard Riley =

Howard Riley may refer to:

- Howard Riley (musician) (1943–2025), English jazz pianist and composer
- Howard Riley (footballer) (1938–2026), English footballer
- Howard W. Riley (1879–1971), professor of agricultural engineering at Cornell University
