= Edward Riley (cricketer) =

English cricketer and police officer

Personal information
- Full name: Edward Charles Riley
- Born: 31 August 1895; Aldershot, Hampshire, England
- Died: 11 February 1963 (aged 67); Leicester, Leicestershire, England
- Batting: Unknown
- Bowling: Unknown

Domestic team information
- Years: Team
- 1918/19: Europeans

Career statistics
Competition	First-class
Matches	1
Runs scored	1
Batting average	0.50
100s/50s	–/–
Top score	1
Balls bowled	138
Wickets	4
Bowling average	22.25
5 wickets in innings	–
10 wickets in match	–
Best bowling	3/57
Catches/stumpings	–/–
- Source: Cricinfo, 2 January 2024

Edward Charles Riley (31 August 1895 – 11 February 1963) was an English first-class cricketer and police officer.

Riley was born at Aldershot in August 1895. In his early-twenties, he served in the British Indian Army Reserve just after the end of the First World War, being commissioned as a second lieutenant in March 1920, antedated to January 1919. In India, he made a single appearance in first-class cricket for the Europeans cricket team against the Indians at Madras in the 1918–19 Madras Presidency Match. Playing as a bowler in the Europeans side, he took the wickets of M. Venkataramanjulu, N. N. Swarna, and P. Yoganathan in the Indians first innings for the cost of 57 runs from fourteen overs. In their second innings, he took the wicket of M. Baliah Naidu for the cost of 32 runs from nine overs. Batting twice in the match, he was dismissed without scoring by Cotah Ramaswami in the Europeans first innings, while in their second innings he was dismissed for a single run by C. R. Ganapathy.

Upon his return to England, Riley became a police officer with the British Railways Police, rising to become superintendent of the Leicester Division, which was based at the Braunstone Gate Depot in Leicester. In October 1949, he directed a campaign to stop thefts by gangs from railway sidings. After retiring from the police, Riley was seriously injured in July 1958 when he was run-over by an ambulance, resulting in both his kneecaps being broken. He was treated for his injuries at Leicester Royal Infirmary and subsequently recovered. Toward the end of his life, Riley went into business and founded the outfitters Riley Bros, based on Charles Street in Leicester. Ill-health would take him away from running the business, with Riley dying at his Leicester residence on 11 February 1963.
