= Larry Riley =

Larry or Lawrence Riley may refer to:

- Larry Riley (basketball), director of scouting for the Golden State Warriors
- Larry Riley (actor) (1953–1992), American actor and musician
- Larry Riley (animator) from Olive Oyl for President
- Lawrence Riley, writer
- Lawrence Joseph Riley, American Catholic bishop
