= Alexander Riley (tracker) =

Australian Aboriginal tracker (1884-1970)

Alexander Riley (1884-1970) was an Australian Aboriginal tracker from the Dubbo area and the first Aboriginal person to gain the rank of sergeant in the New South Wales Police Force.

== Early years ==
Riley was born 26 May 1884 at Nymagee, New South Wales. He was the son of a labourer, John Riley, and his wife Mary, née Calligan.

== Career ==
After working as a stationhand, Riley joined the New South Wales Police Force as a tracker on 11 June 1911. He injured his foot in 1912 and resigned from the police force on 31 August 1914. Riley was reappointed to the NSW police force on 1 January 1918. He was promoted to sergeant on 5 August 1941. He was the first Aboriginal sergeant in the New South Wales police force.

Some of his most notable cases included the capture of Roy Governor, the youngest brother of bushranger Jimmy Governor, at Mendooran in June 1923. He found a barefoot six-year-old girl who had been lost for twenty-four hours in the mountains near Stuart Town. He was also involved in the case of the serial killer “Mad Mossy”.

Riley retired on 13 July 1950 but was denied - alongside female employees and other aboriginals - a police pension (due to him being regarded as a "special part-time employee") even though he had been contributing to the pension from his salary.

== Family life ==
Riley married Ethel Taylor at Wellington on 14 June 1924. They lived at the Talbragar Aboriginal Reserve and together they had eight children.

Riley was a keen footballer and athlete. He coached in athletics at Dubbo for many years.

Riley died on 29 October 1970 at Dubbo.

== Awards and memorials ==
- King’s Police & Fire Services Medal for Distinguished Service – granted 1 January 1943
- Tracker Riley Walkway and Cycle Path along the Macquarie River in Dubbo named in his honour - opened June 1997 by Riley’s grand daughter, Kathy Green, and the Minister for Roads, Carl Scully
- Michael Riley, his great-grandson, made a short documentary film, Blacktracker, that was screened by the Australian Broadcasting Commission in September 1997.
