= Henry Riley (South Carolina politician) =

American politician

- Occupation: Politician

Henry Riley was a state legislator in South Carolina during the Reconstruction era. He represented Orangeburg County. He was one of several African American legislators expelled from the legislature toward the end of the Reconstruction period.
