= Frederick Riley =

Frederick Riley may refer to:

- Frederick Riley (footballer) (1912–1942), English footballer
- Frederick Fox Riley (1869–1934), British politician
- Frederick Riley (trade unionist) (1886–1970), Australian politician
