= John Riley (rugby league) =

English rugby league footballer

Personal information
- Full name: John Riley

Playing information
- Position: Forward
Club
Years	Team	Pld	T	G	FG	P
Sep 1904–08/09	Wakefield Trinity	78	3	0	0	9

John Riley was a professional rugby league footballer who played in the 1900s. He played at club level for Wakefield Trinity, as a forward.
