= Michael Riley (Minnesota politician) =

American politician (1874–1941)

Member of the Minnesota House of Representatives from the 45th district
- In office 1941
- In office 1931–1932

Personal details
- Born: July 19, 1874 Gilmanton Township, Benton County, Minnesota, U.S.
- Died: September 15, 1941 (aged 67)
- Party: Independent
- Children: 5

Michael Riley (July 19, 1874 – September 15, 1941) was an American businessman, farmer, and politician.

== Background ==
Riley was born in Gilmanton Township, Benton County, Minnesota. Riley lived with his wife and family in Foley, Minnesota, and was involved with farming and the cattle and horse business. Riley was also involved in the logging business. He served in the Minnesota House of Representatives in 1931 and 1932 and in 1941. He died while still in office.
