= Joe Riley (footballer, born 1928) =

English footballer

Personal information
- Full name: Joseph Riley
- Date of birth: 6 March 1928
- Place of birth: Stockton-on-Tees, England
- Date of death: 1983 (aged 54–55)
- Place of death: Cleveland, England
- Position: Forward

Senior career*
Years	Team	Apps	(Gls)
	Stockton	0	(0)
1949–1950	Darlington	8	(2)
- * Club domestic league appearances and goals

Joseph Riley (6 March 1928 – 1983) was an English amateur footballer who played as a forward in the Football League for Darlington and in non-league football for Stockton.

Playing at inside left or centre forward, Riley had a run of seven Third Division North matches for Darlington early in the 1949–50 season, beginning with the visit to Doncaster Rovers on 3 September. He scored on his second appearance, in a 4–3 defeat of Bradford City, and again on his sixth, in a 2–1 loss at home to Mansfield Town. His eighth and last senior appearance for Darlington came in December. In October 1949, Riley was selected for an Army XI to play Aston Villa.
