= Edward O'Reilly =

Edward O'Reilly may refer to:

- Edward O'Reilly (scholar) (1765–1830), Irish scholar
- Tex O'Reilly (1880–1946), American mercenary
