= Jack Riley (cricketer) =

English cricketer

Personal information
- Born: 27 April 1927; Accrington, Lancashire, England
- Died: 28 May 2008 (aged 81); England
- Batting: Right-handed
- Bowling: Slow left-arm orthodox

Domestic team information
- Years: Team
- 1953: Worcestershire
- First-class debut: 16 May 1953; Worcestershire v Cambridge University
- Last First-class: 19 May 1953; Worcestershire v Cambridge University

Career statistics
| Competition | FC |
|---|---|
| Matches | 1 |
| Runs scored | 1 |
| Batting average | 1.00 |
| 100s/50s | 0/0 |
| Top score | 1 |
| Balls bowled | 124 |
| Wickets | 3 |
| Bowling average | 16.00 |
| 5 wickets in innings | 0 |
| 10 wickets in match | 0 |
| Best bowling | 3/25 |
| Catches/stumpings | 1/0 |
- Source: CricketArchive, 2 March 2009

Jack Riley (27 April 1927 – 28 May 2008) was an English cricketer. He appeared just once in first-class cricket, playing for Worcestershire against Cambridge University at Fenner's in May 1953, taking 3/25 in Cambridge's first innings. Among his victims was the university's captain Robin Marlar.

By far the largest part of Riley's career – more than 300 matches – was spent playing for Enfield in the Lancashire League between 1950 and 1968 and captaining them between 1956 and 1963, having previously played for Accrington. In late August 1963 he took five wickets for just one run in 4.7 eight-ball overs against Ramsbottom.
