= Ivers Riley =

Financial expert (1932–2015)

Ivers Whitman Riley (September 28, 1932 in Los Angeles, California – February 17, 2015 in Savannah, Georgia) was Chairman of the International Securities Exchange from 2002 to 2006, as well as Chief Executive of the Hong Kong Futures Exchange from 1994 to 1997 and again from 1999 to 2000. He has been recognized as a driving force behind the development of SPDR funds and in 2005 he was inducted into the Futures Industry Hall of Fame.

== Background ==
Ivers Riley graduated from The University of California, Los Angeles in 1955 with a Bachelor of Science degree in finance. In 1986, Riley attended the six-week Advanced Management Program at Harvard Business School. He was Executive Vice President of the New York Stock Exchange from 1983 to 1986. From 1987 to 1993, Riley was Senior Executive Vice President in charge of all derivatives activity at the American Stock Exchange, where he helped coordinate a plan to attract trading of SPDR funds. From 1994 to 1997 and again from 1999 to 2000, Riley was Chief Executive of the Hong Kong Futures Exchange and Charmain of the Hong Kong Futures Exchange Clearing Corporation. From 2002 to 2006 he was Chairman of the International Securities Exchange.
