= Paul Riley =

Paul Riley may refer to:

- Paul Riley (actor) (born 1962), Scottish actor
- Paul Riley (musician) (born 1951), British bassist and record producer
- Paul Riley (footballer) (born 1963), footballer and coach
- Paul Riley (cricketer) (born 1981), English cricketer
- Paul Riley (The Bill), fictional character from TV show The Bill
- Paul E. Riley (1942–2001), U.S. federal judge

== See also ==
- Paul Reilly (disambiguation)
