= General Riley =

General Riley may refer to:

- Guy Riley (1884–1964), British Army major general
- Jonathon Riley (British Army officer) (born 1955), British Army lieutenant general
- Thomas F. Riley (1912–1998), U.S. Marine Corps brigadier general
- William E. Riley (1897–1970), U.S. Marine Corps lieutenant general

== See also ==
- General Reilly (disambiguation)
