= Cliff Riley =

Australian rules footballer

Personal information
- Full name: Clifford David Riley
- Born: 2 February 1927 (age 99); Ararat, Victoria
- Original team: University Blacks
- Height: 177 cm (5 ft 10 in)
- Weight: 72 kg (159 lb)

Playing career^{1}
Years	Club	Games (Goals)
1951–52	St Kilda	16 (8)
- ^{1} Playing statistics correct to the end of 1952.

Clifford David Riley (born 2 February 1927) is a former Australian rules footballer who played with St Kilda in the Victorian Football League (VFL).

Riley enlisted in the Royal Australian Navy and served during the later part of World War II.

Riley's mother, Bea Riley, was Australia's oldest person at 112 years old until her death in 2009.
