= Emily Riley (disambiguation) =

Emily Riley or Reilly may refer to:

- Emily Riley, Canadian curler
- Emily Riley (actress) in Left for Dead (2007 horror film)
- Emily Riley, footballer for Crewe Alexandra L.F.C.
- Emily Reilly, character in The Killing Room
