= Terence Riley =

Terence Riley may refer to:

- Terence Riley (cricketer), English cricketer.
- Terence Riley (curator), American architect and museum curator.
