= James J. Riley =

American physicist

James Joseph Riley is an American fluid dynamicist and professor emeritus in mechanical engineering at the University of Washington. Prior to his retirement, he was the university's inaugural PACCAR Professor of Engineering.

Riley graduated from Rockhurst College in 1965 and received his PhD from Johns Hopkins University in 1972. He is a fellow of the American Physical Society, of the American Society of Mechanical Engineers and of the American Association for the Advancement of Science. He was also elected a member of the National Academy of Engineering in 2014 for contributions in analysis, modeling, and computations of transitioning and turbulent phenomena.
