= John Reilly (painter) =

British painter (1928–2010)

- Born: 1928; Walton-on-Thames, Surrey, England, U.K.
- Died: 2010 (aged 81–82); Isle of Wight, England
- Education: Kingston-upon-Thames Art College (1949-52)
- Known for: Painting,Ceramics,Pottery

John Reilly (1928-2010) was an English oil painter and potter who focused primarily on Christian themes.

== Life ==
Reilly was born in Walton-on-Thames, Surrey, in 1928, where he spent his early childhood with his parents and four sisters. During the Second World War, his family moved to Leeds. He trained in Kingston-upon-Thames Art College (1949-52).

Reilly moved to the Isle of Wight in 1954. There he met and worked with the potter Joe Lester Senior.

In 1958 he and his wife, the potter Elspeth Henderson, set up the Ventnor Pottery Studio. They had two daughters, one of whom also became a potter.

=== Art career ===
Reilly specialised in distinctive, brightly coloured ceramics, mainly plaques and tiles using subtle, jewel-like colours and geometric patterns which are very recognisable. Figures appear to be part of the pattern of the painting, yet stand out from it. He painted in oils.
