= Elizabeth Riley =

African-American abolitionist

Elizabeth Cook Riley (née Cook; c. 1792 – 1855) was an African-American Bostonian abolitionist who aided in the escape of fugitive slave Shadrach Minkins. She was a member of the committee which raised the first funds towards William Lloyd Garrison's The Liberator, a prominent antislavery newspaper. Afterwards, she was active in the Boston abolitionist community, helping to organize meetings and events.

== Biography ==
=== Personal life ===
Born Elizabeth Cook, Riley was married to William Riley, the owner of a clothing store at 22 Brattle Street, which he had been operating since 1827. She also had two daughters, apparently from a previous marriage, named Sarah and Ann Jackson. With William she had three more children: William Jr., George, and Eliza Riley. Her husband died in 1849 and left most of his estate to her.

=== Activism ===
Though she was apparently unable to write, Riley was active in the abolitionist community that surrounded The Liberator, being a member of the African-American Female Intelligence Society and the Boston Female Anti-Slavery Society. Riley was once accused of spending $2000 of her husband's money as donations to the local church, leaving their family impoverished and starving. Mrs. Riley and her husband subsequently refuted this rumor in the newspaper, noting that they had contributed only modestly, and stating that while they sometimes experienced financial difficulty, they were always able to get by. On his death, Mr. Riley willed additional funds to the building fund of the church.

Riley was instrumental in the escape of fugitive slave Shadrach Minkins, whom she hid in the attic of her house on 70 Southac Street until he could be removed safely from Boston. Minkins was able to successfully escape to Canada as a result. This residence had been purchased by Mr. Riley in 1835, along with the adjacent house at 68 Southac, located centrally in the now-historic Beacon Hill area of Boston, home of the Massachusetts State House, and noted for its function as a hub of African-American and abolitionist organizing. These buildings were extremely nearby to the noted Lewis and Harriet Hayden House, which stands at 66 Southac (the street has since been renamed Phillips) — a frequent haven used almost continually by the Underground Railroad. The adjoining no. 68 was occupied by a barber named Thomas Cole, another active member of the abolitionist community who endowed large sums of money to the cause.

=== Later life and death ===
After her husband's death, Riley continued to live in the same location that she had occupied with her husband. She remained involved in the local community, at one point holding a party at her house for the children of a nearby African-American Sunday school on Belknap Street. Riley died in 1855 at the age of 63. Her funeral was reportedly attended by a large number of mourners. Her obituary states that she had cared those ill and in need for "many years," apparently spending much of her older years as a nurse.

== See also ==
- The Liberator
- Shadrach Minkins
- Beacon Hill
- Boston African-American National Historic Site
- Black Heritage Trail (Boston)
- William Lloyd Garrison
