= Fly Me (novel) =

2017 novel

- First edition
- Author: Daniel Riley
- Language: English
- Publisher: Little, Brown
- Publication date: 2017
- Publication place: United States
- Media type: Print (hardback & paperback)
- ISBN: 978-0-316-36213-9

Fly Me is the 2017 debut novel by American writer Daniel Riley.
