= James Riley (footballer) =

English footballer

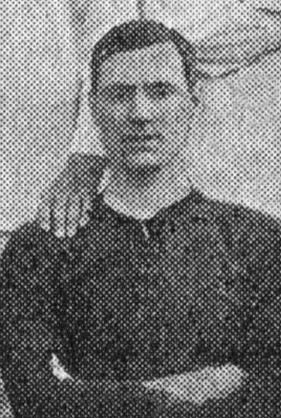
- James Riley in 1909

Personal information
- Full name: James Edward Riley
- Date of birth: 1880
- Place of birth: Burnley, England
- Date of death: 1938 (aged 57–58)
- Place of death: Burnley, England
- Position: Full back

Senior career*
Years	Team	Apps	(Gls)
1905–1907	Burnley	3	(0)
- * Club domestic league appearances and goals

James Edward Riley (1880–1938) was an English professional footballer who played as a full back. He played in the Football League for Burnley.
