= Bob Riley (American football coach) =

American football player and coach

Biographical details
- Born: Hudson, New Hampshire, U.S.
- Education: Wyoming

Playing career
- 1955–1958: Northern State
- Position: End

Coaching career (HC unless noted)
- 1967: Garden City
- 1968: Wichita State (DB)
- 1969: Mesa JC (CO) (DB/WR)
- 1970–1971: Montana Tech
- 1974: Peru State
- 1975–1978: Kelly Walsh HS (WY)

Head coaching record
- Overall: 22–7 (college); 8–3 (junior college)
- Bowls: 0–1 (junior college)
- Tournaments: 0–1 (NAIA D-II playoffs)

Accomplishments and honors

Championships
- 1 KJJCC (1967); 2 Frontier (1970–1971)

Robert Riley was an American football player and coach. He served as the head football coach at Montana Technological University from 1970 to 1971 and at Peru State College in Peru, Nebraska in 1974. After one year at Peru State, he transitioned from college coaching to become the head coach at Kelly Walsh High School in Casper, Wyoming, from 1975 to 1978.

Riley was born in Hudson, New Hampshire and grew up in Gloucester, Massachusetts. He played college football as an end at Northern State College—now known as Northern State University—in Aberdeen, South Dakota.

== Head coaching record ==
=== College ===
Year	Team	Overall	Conference	Standing	Bowl/playoffs
Montana Tech Orediggers (Frontier Conference) (1970–1971)
1970	Montana Tech	9–1	5–0	1st	
1971	Montana Tech	9–2	5–0	1st	L NAIA Division II Semifinal
Montana Tech:		18–3	10–0		
Peru State Bobcats (Nebraska College Conference) (1974)
1974	Peru State	4–6	0–3	4th	
Peru State:		4–6	0–3		
Total:		22–7			
National championship Conference title Conference division title or championship game berth

=== Junior college ===
Year	Team	Overall	Conference	Standing	Bowl/playoffs
Garden City Broncbusters (Kansas Jayhawk Junior College Conference) (1967)
1967	Garden City	8–3	7–1	1st	L Sterling Silver Bowl
Garden City:		8–3	7–1		
Total:		8–3			
National championship Conference title Conference division title or championship game berth
