= William O'Reilly =

William O'Reilly or Bill O'Reilly may refer to:

- Bill O'Reilly (cricketer) (1905–1992), Australian cricketer
- Bill O'Reilly (political commentator) (born 1949), American commentator, author and television host
- William O'Reilly (MP) (1792–1844), UK MP for the Irish constituency of Dundalk, 1832–1835
- William O'Reilly (educator) (1864–1937), Irish educator
- William Edmund O'Reilly (1873–1934), British diplomat
- William F. B. O'Reilly (born 1963), American political consultant

== See also ==
- William Riley (disambiguation)
