= Jason Riley =

Jason Riley may refer to:

- Jason L. Riley (born 1971), American commentator and author
- Jason Riley (Canadian football) (born 1958), Canadian football offensive lineman
- Jason Riley (trainer) (born 1975), American athletic trainer
