= Governor Riley =

Governor Riley may refer to:

- Bob C. Riley (1924–1994), Acting Governor of Arkansas in 1975
- Bob Riley (born 1944), 52nd Governor of Alabama
- Richard Riley (born 1933), 111th Governor of South Carolina
- Bennet C. Riley (1787–1853), 7th Military Governor of California

== See also ==
- Bernard Rawdon Reilly (1882–1966), first Governor of Aden
