= Susan Riley =

Susan or Sue Riley may refer to:

- Susie Frances Harrison (1859–1935, née Susan Riley), Canadian poet, novelist and music composer
- Susan Riley, character in Maniac Cop 2
- Sue Riley, character in Taxi!
- Sue Riley (poet), winner of 2019 Ginkgo Prize
