= Tim Riley =

Tim Riley may refer to:

- Tim Riley (radio personality), anchor/reporter with AM 860 and KKOV in Portland, Oregon
- Tim Riley (music critic), author of books about The Beatles and Bob Dylan
- Tim Riley, member of American Christian music group Gold City
