= Kevin Riley (disambiguation) =

Kevin Riley may refer to:

- Kevin Riley (born 1987), former American football quarterback for California
- Kevin Riley (politician), member of the New York City Council
- Kevin Buchanan (born Kevin Riley), a One Life to Live character
- Kevin Riley (Star Trek), a Star Trek character

== See also ==
- Kevin Reilly (disambiguation)
