= Kenneth Riley (painter) =

American artist (1919–2015)

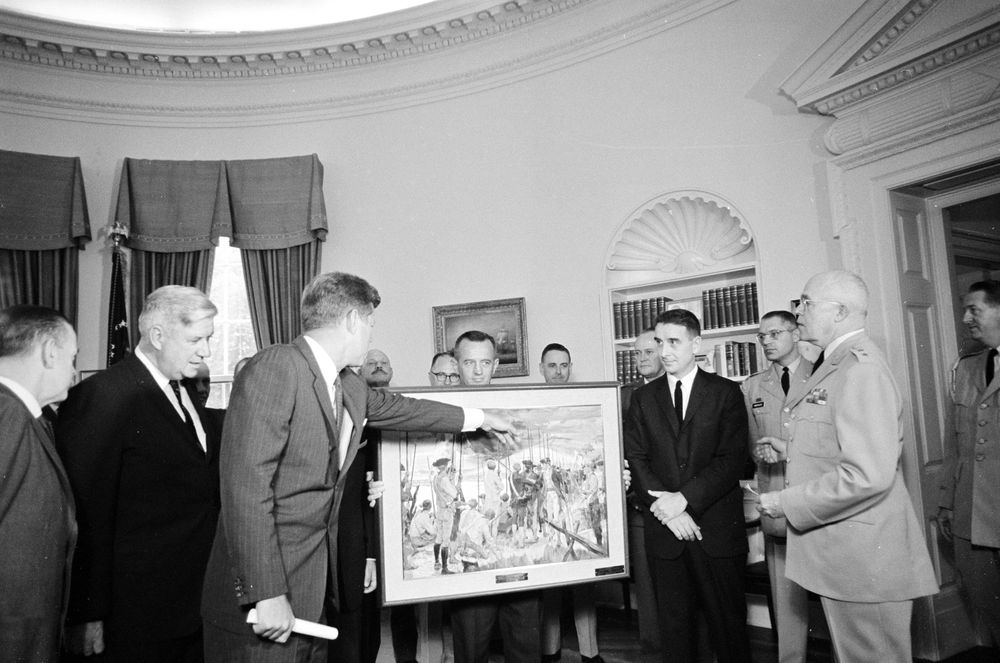
Presentation of "The Whites of Their Eyes" to President Kennedy, September 25, 1962

Kenneth Pauling Riley (1919–2015), often called Ken Riley, was an American realist history painter of the Old West, a prolific illustrator, and a war artist in the Pacific during World War II.

== Life ==
He was born in Waverly, Missouri in 1919, but grew up in Kansas where his ability was first recognized at the Kansas City Art Institute. After studying there, and under Frank DuMond and Harvey Dunn, Riley began work as an illustrator of pulp fiction in 1941, but with the entry of the United States into World War II later that year he enlisted and was sent out to the Pacific as a war artist. After the war his success increased, and one of his paintings, "The Whites of Their Eyes", depicting the Battle of Bunker Hill, was acquired by President John F. Kennedy for the White House collection. He died in 2015.

== Accolades ==
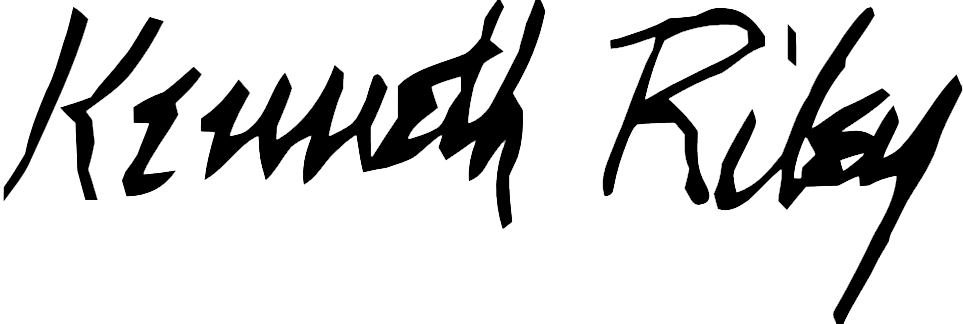
Kenneth Riley's signature

Awards

- Prix de West at the National Cowboy and Western Heritage Museum, 1995;
- Eiteljog Museum Award for excellence in American Art.

Honors

- Charter member of the National Academy of Western Artists;
- Member of the Cowboy Artists of America, 1982.

== Gallery ==
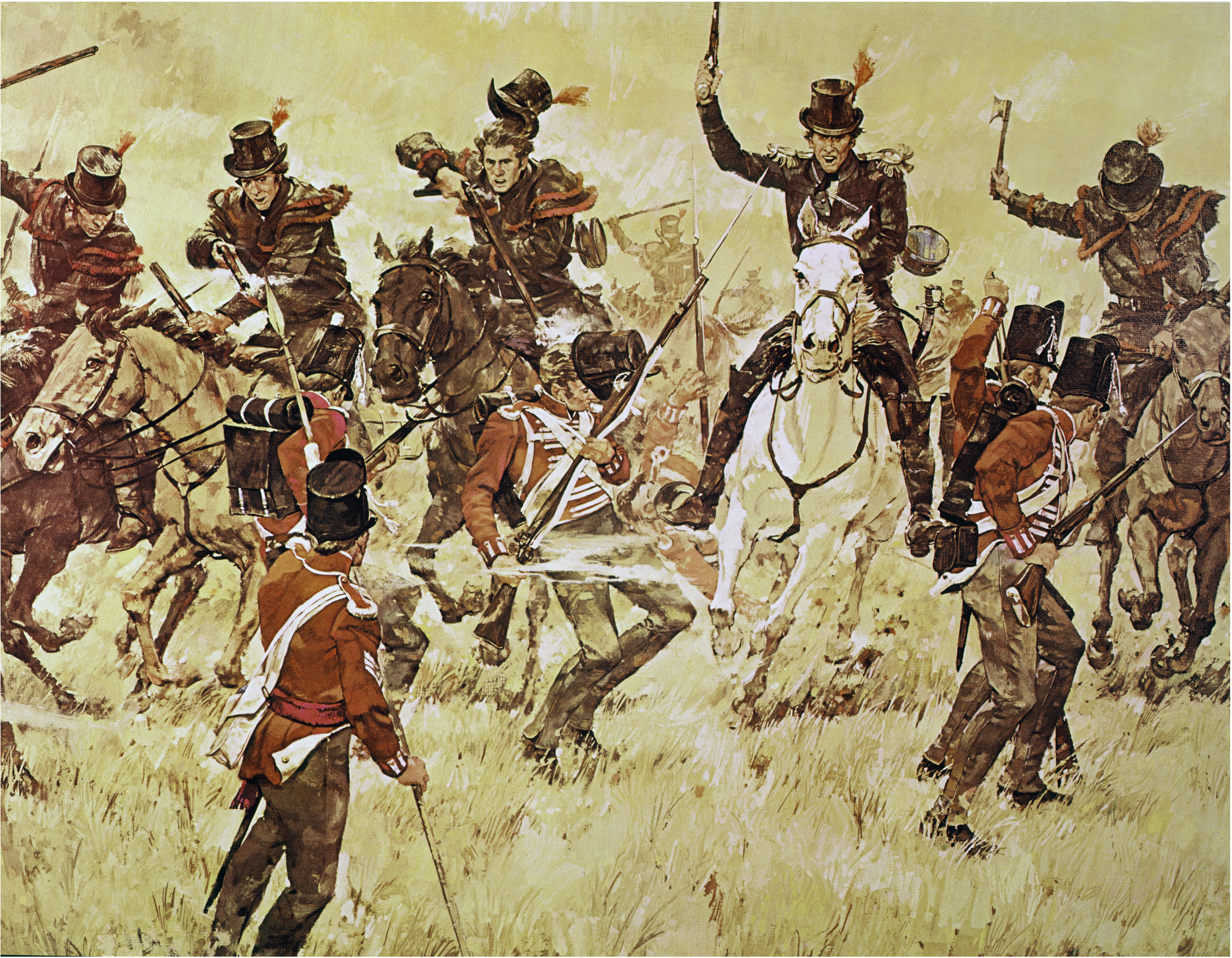
"Remember the River Raisin!"

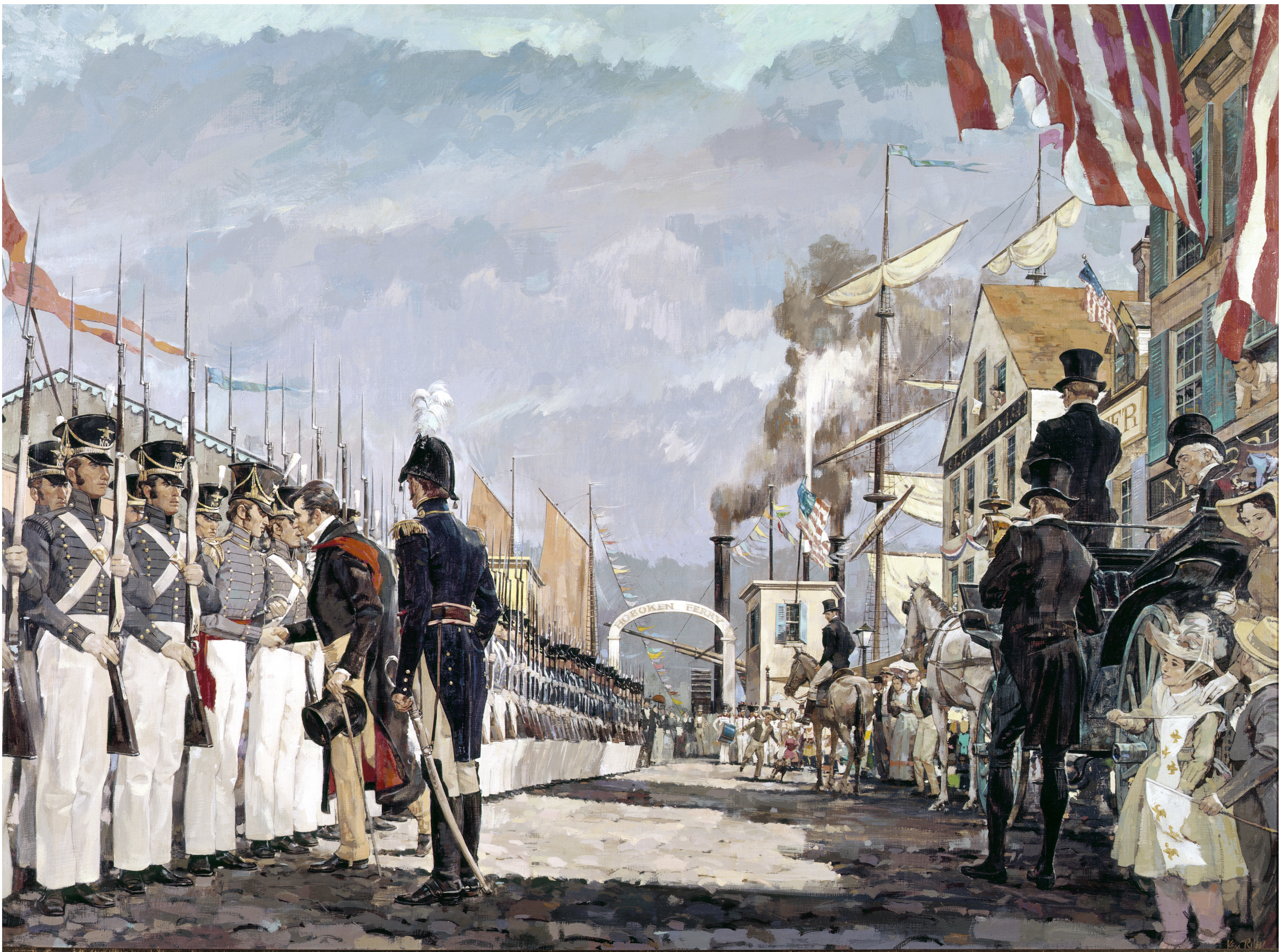
Lafayette and the National Guard

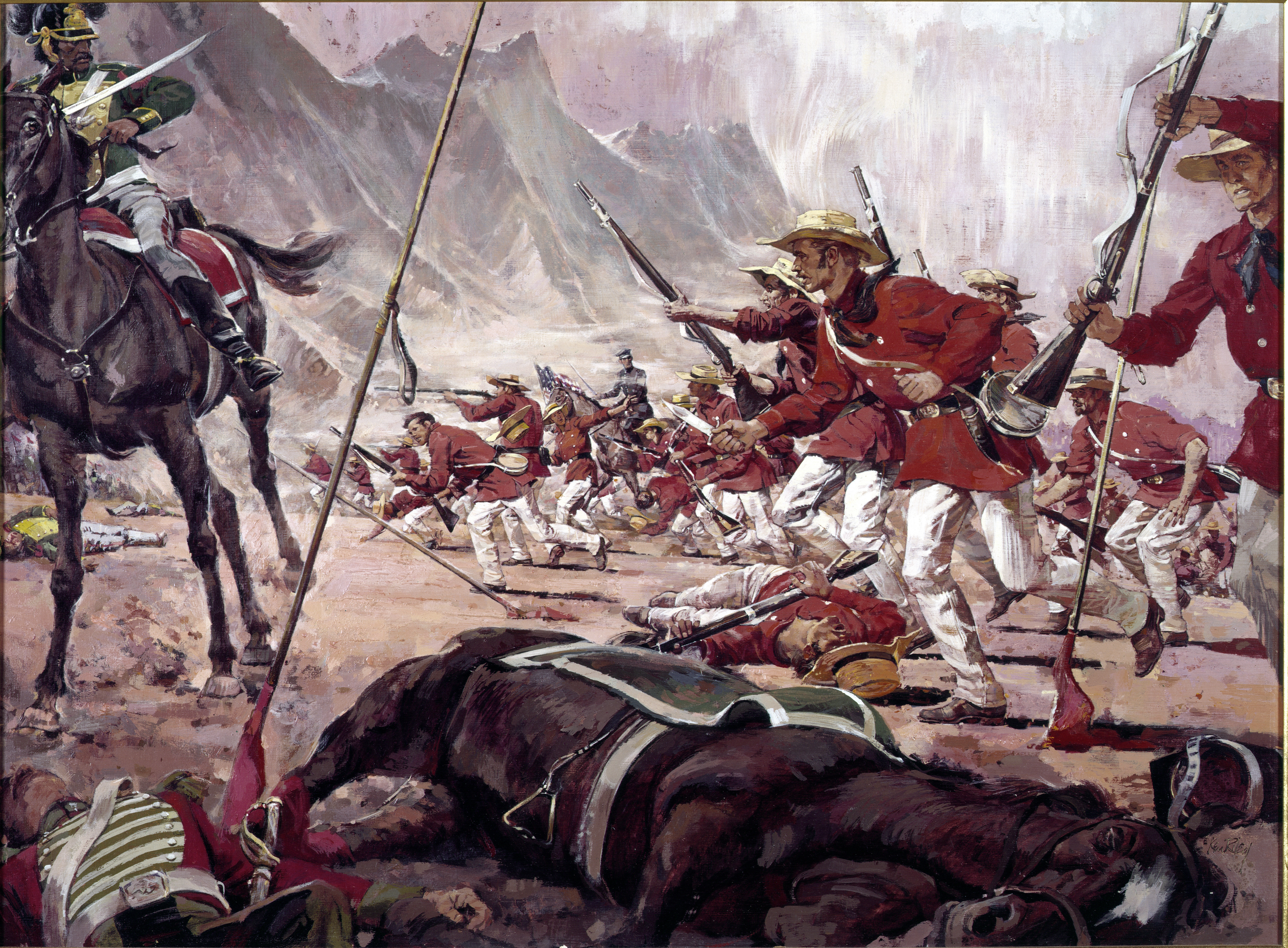
The Mississippi Rifles

== Sources ==
- Wilkinson, Todd (January 2023). "The Painting Life of Riley". Western Arts & Architecture.
- "Kenneth Riley". ArtzLine. 2019.
- "Kenneth Riley". Mormon Literature & Creative Arts. Brigham Young University.
- "Kenneth Riley, CA". The Eddie Basha Collection. 2019.
- "Presentation of a painting, "The Whites of Their Eyes", by Ken Riley to President Kennedy". John F. Kennedy Presidential Library and Museum.
