= Jeff Riley =

Australian rules footballer

Personal information
- Full name: Thomas Jefferson Riley
- Born: 16 January 1880; Dargo, Victoria
- Died: 1 March 1954 (aged 74); Murrumbeena, Victoria
- Original team: Warriors

Playing career^{1}
Years	Club	Games (Goals)
1909	St Kilda	1 (0)
- ^{1} Playing statistics correct to the end of 1909.

Thomas Jefferson Riley (16 January 1880 – 1 March 1954) was an Australian rules footballer who played with St Kilda in the Victorian Football League (VFL).

== Family ==
The son of Samuel Thompson Riley (c.1829-1905), and Jane Riley (c.1840-1912), née Hughes, Thomas Jefferson Riley was born at Dargo, Victoria on 16 January 1880.

He married Edith Selina Collins (1881-1946) in 1902.

== Football ==
Cleared to St Kilda from the Warrior Football Club in the Goldfields Football League on 26 May 1909. he played his only senior VFL game, against Geelong on 5 June 1909.

Geoffrey [sic] Riley from the Warriors, Western Australia, will most likely be seen in St. Kilda colours shortly. He showed excellent form at practice recently and as he obtained his permit on Wednesday evening, his appearance on St. Kilda's defence lines is only a matter of time. He is a farmer at Berwick and ploughing and other manual labour is helping to get him into condition while a football is on hand to bring him up to the standard in handling the ball. He was acknowledged as a champion in Western Australia.
The Argus, 28 May 1909.
Riley, who recently obtained a transfer from "The Warriors", Western Australia, will probably appear [for St Kilda] on the half-back line [against Geelong, tomorrow]. He is a farmer at Berwick, and is the owner of a traction-engine and chaff-cutting plant. Crops are growing and the chaff is all cut, so Riley feels he can devote some spare time to football.
The Argus, 4 June 1909.

== Politics ==
He was President of the Carnegie Ratepayers' Association (in 1919), and was elected to the Caulfield City Council in 1922.

He was the Liberal candidate for the Victorian Legislative Assembly's seat of Oakleigh in 1927.

He was the President of the Old Westralians Association in 1929.

== Death ==
He died on 1 March 1954 at Murrumbeena, Victoria.
