= Frank Riley =

Frank Riley may refer to:

- Frank Riley (athlete) (1887–1950), American athlete
- Frank Riley (author) (1915–1996), pseudonym of Frank Rhylick, an American science fiction author
- Frank Branch Riley (1875–1975), American attorney and public speaker
- Frank E. Riley (1865–?), member of the Wisconsin State Assembly
- Frank M. Riley (1875–1949), architect of Madison, Wisconsin

== See also ==
- Frank Reilly (disambiguation)
