= Karen Riley =

Karen S. Riley (born c. 1963) is an American psychologist and academic administrator specializing in neurodevelopmental disorders. She has served as the 18th president of Slippery Rock University since 2023.

== Life ==
Riley was born c. 1963 and raised in Littleton, Colorado. She earned a B.S. in psychology from the Colorado State University. She received a M.A. in early childhood special education and a Ph.D. in educational psychology at the University of Denver. She completed a two-year postdoctoral fellowship at the Children's Hospital Colorado. During her fellowship, she worked in the Fragile X treatment and research center and the child development unit.

Riley specializes in neurodevelopmental disorders including Fragile X syndrome and Down syndrome. She was an early childhood specialist and early childhood special education coordinator. She was later dean of the college of education at the University of Denver for seven years. In 2021, Riley became the provost and chief academic officer of Regis University. On July 1, 2023, Riley became the 18th president of Slippery Rock University, succeeding William Behre. She is its second female president.
