= Jim Riley =

Jim Riley may refer to:

- Jim Riley (drummer), American drummer
- Jim Riley (American football) (born 1945), American football player
- Jim Riley (cricketer) (born 1948), New Zealand cricketer
- Jim Riley (outfielder) (1886–1949), Major League Baseball player
- Jim Riley (ice hockey) (1895–1969), Canadian ice hockey and baseball player
- Jim Riley (gunfighter)
- Jim Riley (Life of Riley), a fictional character on the BBC sitcom The Life of Riley, portrayed by Neil Dudgeon

== See also ==
- James Riley (disambiguation)
