= James Riley (cricketer) =

English cricketer

Personal information
- Full name: James Riley
- Born: 11 December 1860; Kirkby-in-Ashfield, Nottinghamshire, England
- Died: 8 November 1937 (aged 76); Derby, Derbyshire, England
- Batting: Right-handed
- Bowling: Right-arm medium

Domestic team information
- Years: Team
- 1898: Nottinghamshire

Career statistics
Competition	First-class
Matches	2
Runs scored	3
Batting average	3.00
100s/50s	–/–
Top score	3
Balls bowled	115
Wickets	–
Bowling average	–
5 wickets in innings	–
10 wickets in match	–
Best bowling	–
Catches/stumpings	1/–
- Source: Cricinfo, 26 November 2011

James Riley (11 December 1860 – 8 November 1937) was an English cricketer. Riley was a right-handed batsman who bowled right-arm medium pace. He was born at Kirkby-in-Ashfield, Nottinghamshire.

Riley made two first-class appearances for Nottinghamshire in 1898 against Derbyshire at Trent Bridge in the County Championship and against the Marylebone Cricket Club at Lord's. These two matches saw him score a total of 3 runs and bowled a total of 23 wicketless overs.

He died at Derby, Derbyshire on 8 November 1937.
