= Chris Riley =

Chris Riley may refer to:

- Chris Riley (golfer) (born 1973), American professional golfer on the PGA Tour
- Chris Riley (rugby league) (born 1988), rugby league footballer
- Chris Riley (priest) (1954–2025), Australian priest and prominent youth worker
- Chris Riley (New Zealand footballer) (born 1964), New Zealand international football (soccer) player
- Chris Riley (Welsh footballer) (born 1939), Welsh football (soccer) player
- Chris Riley (Blue Heelers), a fictional character on the Australian TV show Blue Heelers

== See also ==
- Christopher Riley (born 1967), British science writer and film maker
