= Martin Riley =

Martin Riley may refer to:

- Martin Riley (basketball) (born 1954), former Canadian basketball player
- Martin Riley (cricketer) (1851–1899), Yorkshire cricketer
- Martin Riley (footballer) (born 1988), English professional football defender
