= John Reilly (Australian footballer) =

Australian rules footballer

Personal information
- Full name: John Arthur Reilly
- Born: 11 January 1942 (age 84); East Fremantle, Western Australia
- Original team: South Fremantle
- Height: 191 cm (6 ft 3 in)
- Weight: 87 kg (192 lb)

Playing career^{1}
Years	Club	Games (Goals)
1962–1965	Carlton	39 (1)
1966–1969	Footscray	55 (1)
- ^{1} Playing statistics correct to the end of unknown.

John Arthur Reilly (born 11 January 1942) is a former Australian rules footballer who played with Carlton Football Club then Footscray in the Victorian Football League.

Originally from South Fremantle, he returned to play for them in 1970 and played in their West Australian Football League premiership winning side. He is the son of former South Fremantle ruckman Jack "Corp" Reilly and the elder brother of Graeme Reilly, who played alongside John in the 1970 premiership. Graeme died of a brain tumour in February 1975, aged 28, after collapsing at training during the 1974 season.
