= Judge Riley =

Judge Riley may refer to:

- Paul E. Riley (1942–2001), judge of the United States District Court for the Southern District of Illinois
- William F. Riley (judge) (1884–1956), judge of the United States District Court for the Southern District of Iowa
- William J. Riley (1947–2023), judge of the United States Court of Appeals for the Eighth Circuit

== See also ==
- Justice Riley
