= Chuck Riley =

Chuck Riley may refer to:

- Chuck Riley (American football) (c. 1906–?), American football player and coach
- Chuck Riley (politician) (born 1939), American politician in the state of Oregon
- Chuck Riley (voice actor) (1940–2007), American voice-over artist
- Chuck Riley (murderer) (born 1955), American murderer convicted in the 1975 "barbecue murders" case

== See also ==
- Charles Riley (disambiguation)
