= Duke Riley =

Duke Riley may refer to:

- Duke Riley (artist), American artist
- Duke Riley (American football) (born 1994), American football player
