= Brett Riley (writer) =

American writer and college professor

Brett Alan Riley is an American writer and college professor.

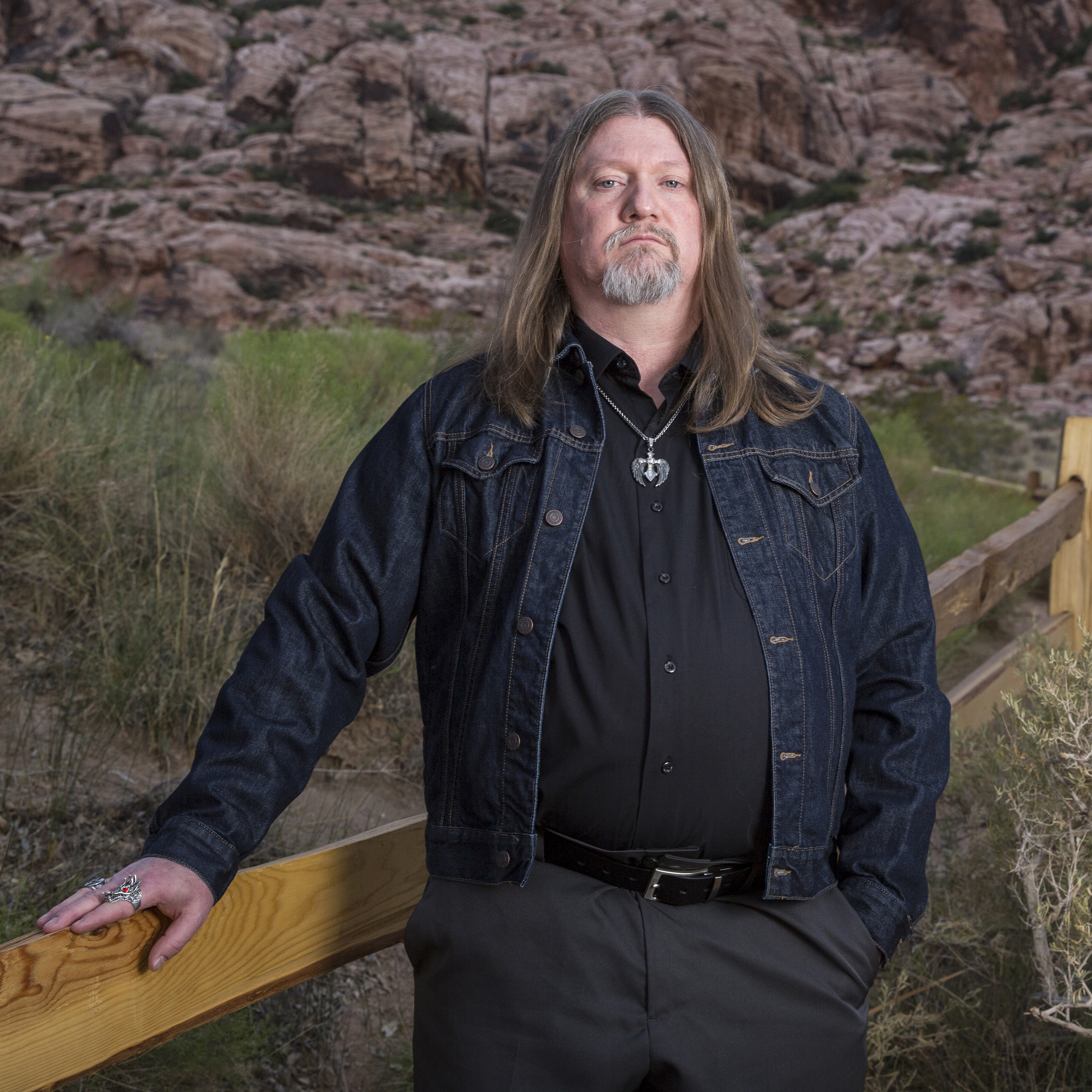
Brett Riley

== Biography ==
In 2013, Ink Brush Press published Riley's collection of linked short stories, The Subtle Dance of Impulse and Light.

Riley's debut novel, Comanche: A Novel, was published by Imbrifex Books in September 2020. and was generally well received.

== Works ==
=== Books ===
- The Subtle Dance of Impulse and Light (2013)
- Comanche: A Novel (2020)
- Lord of Order: A Novel (2021)
- FREAKS: A Novel (2022)

=== Screenplays ===
- Candy's First Kiss (2014)
