= Cheryl Riley =

Cheryl Riley may refer to:

- Cheryl Pepsii Riley, American singer and actress
- Cheryl R. Riley, American furniture designer and artist
