= Harold Riley (cricketer) =

English cricketer (1902–1989)

Harold Riley (3 October 1902 – 24 January 1989) was an English cricketer active from 1924 to 1937 who played for Leicestershire. He was born in Stoney Stanton and died in Leicester. He appeared in 94 first-class matches as a righthanded batsman who bowled off breaks. He scored 2,346 runs with a highest score of 101 and took five wickets with a best performance of two for 32.
