= Mike Reilly (golfer) =

American golfer

Michael Reilly (born April 8, 1968) is an American professional golfer. Reilly was born in Babylon, New York.

Since 1994, Reilly has competed in more than 60 professional golfing events, including eight New York State Opens, seven Metropolitan Opens, and eight Metropolitan PGA Championships. In 2003, he competed on the PGA Tour in the Buick Classic, at Westchester Country Club in Rye, New York.
