= Matthew Riley =

British businessman

Matthew Robinson Riley
- Born: February 1974 (age 52); United Kingdom
- Occupation: Businessman
- Known for: Founder and executive chairman of communication company Daisy Group

Matthew Riley (born February 1974) is a British businessman and the founder and executive chairman of Daisy Group, a UK-based provider of business communications and IT services.

== Early life ==
Riley left school at the age of 16 and entered a Youth Training Scheme (YTS) as a trainee fax machine engineer with the Burnley-based office technology company, FH Brown.

== Career ==
Riley later worked as UK sales manager for the German telecommunications company DeTeWe AG, a position he held until 1999. In 1998, he founded Daisy Executive Search & Selection, followed by Coms Care in 1999, where he was chief executive officer until the company was acquired in 2001.

In 2001, Riley established Daisy Group. The company expanded through a series of acquisitions, listing on the Alternative Investment Market (AIM) in 2009 before returning to private ownership in 2014. In 2018, it was acquired by a consortium led by Toscafund in a deal reportedly valued at £1.6 billion, with Riley resuming his role as chairman. In May 2025, Daisy Group merged with Virgin Media O2.

Riley has also held non-executive roles, including chairman of the audit and remuneration committees of Time Out Group and non-executive director of Tialis Essential IT PLC. He was a guest interviewer on the BBC Television series, The Apprentice in 2011 and 2012.

== Recognition ==
Riley has received several UK business awards, including:

- Young Entrepreneur of the Year, Ernst & Young (2007)
- Dealmaker of the Year, City Awards (2010)
- Outstanding Achievement Award, ICT Forum (2019)
