= Mike Riley =

Mike Riley may refer to:

- Mike Riley (American football) (born 1953), American football coach
- Mike Riley (referee) (born 1964), English football referee
- Mike Riley (musician) (1904–1984), American trombonist
- Mike Riley (curler) (born c. 1946), Canadian curler
- Mike Riley (cartoonist) (born 1975), American comic book creator

== See also ==
- Mike Reilly (disambiguation)
- Michael Riley (disambiguation)
