= Norma Riley =

Electrical engineer

Norma Riley is an electrical engineer at Northrop Grumman Corporation in Albuquerque, New Mexico. She was named a Fellow of the Institute of Electrical and Electronics Engineers (IEEE) in 2014 for her contributions to ultra-wideband phased array technologies.
