= Earlypay =

Australian financial technology company

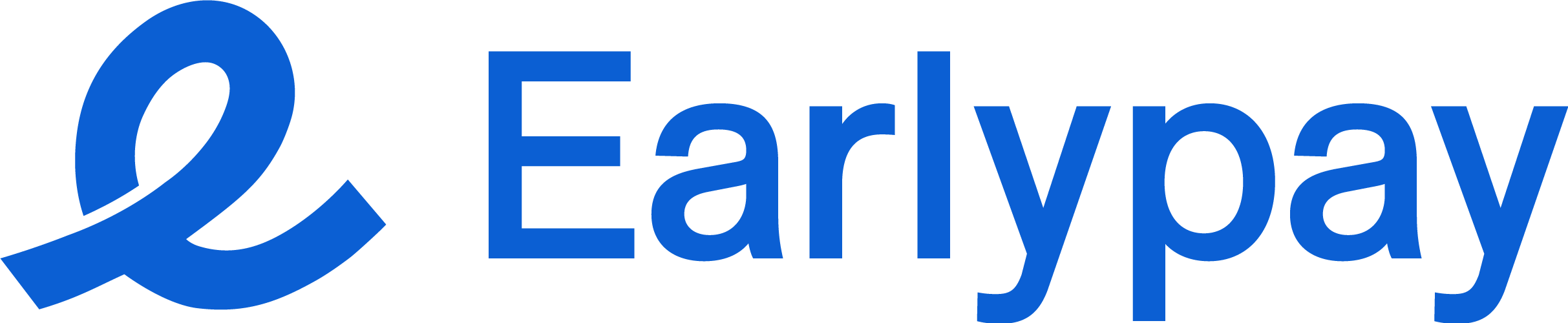
- Company type: Public
- Traded as: ASX: EPY
- Industry: Financial services
- Founded: Sydney, Australia (2001)
- Headquarters: Sydney, Australia
- Key people: James Beeson, CEO

Earlypay is an Australian company listed on the Australian Stock Exchange. Earlypay provides business finance Australia-wide including Invoice Finance, Asset and Equipment Finance, and Trade Finance. to Australian small to medium size businesses.

== History ==
The business was founded by Daniel Riley and his father, Greg Riley, in 2001. Initially established as a labour hire business, the organisation translated to a finance provider for labour hire businesses as well as other sectors. Formerly, known as CML Group Limited, the business re-branded to Earlypay in November 2020.

In June 2022, Earlypay launched Earlypay Business Finance and Lending Training and Development Scholarship Program for finance professionals in partnership with Accendo Financial. Comprising an 11-week business finance and lending course, part of the program attracts CPD points with industry bodies; the Finance Brokers Association of Australia (FBAA), the Commercial and Asset Finance Brokers Association (CAFBA) and the Mortgage and Finance Association of Australia (MFAA).

In October 2022, after two decades of service, Daniel Riley retired from his position as CEO. Stepping into this role with vision and determination, James Beeson assumed leadership, bringing a fresh perspective.
