= Janet Mary Riley =

American lawyer

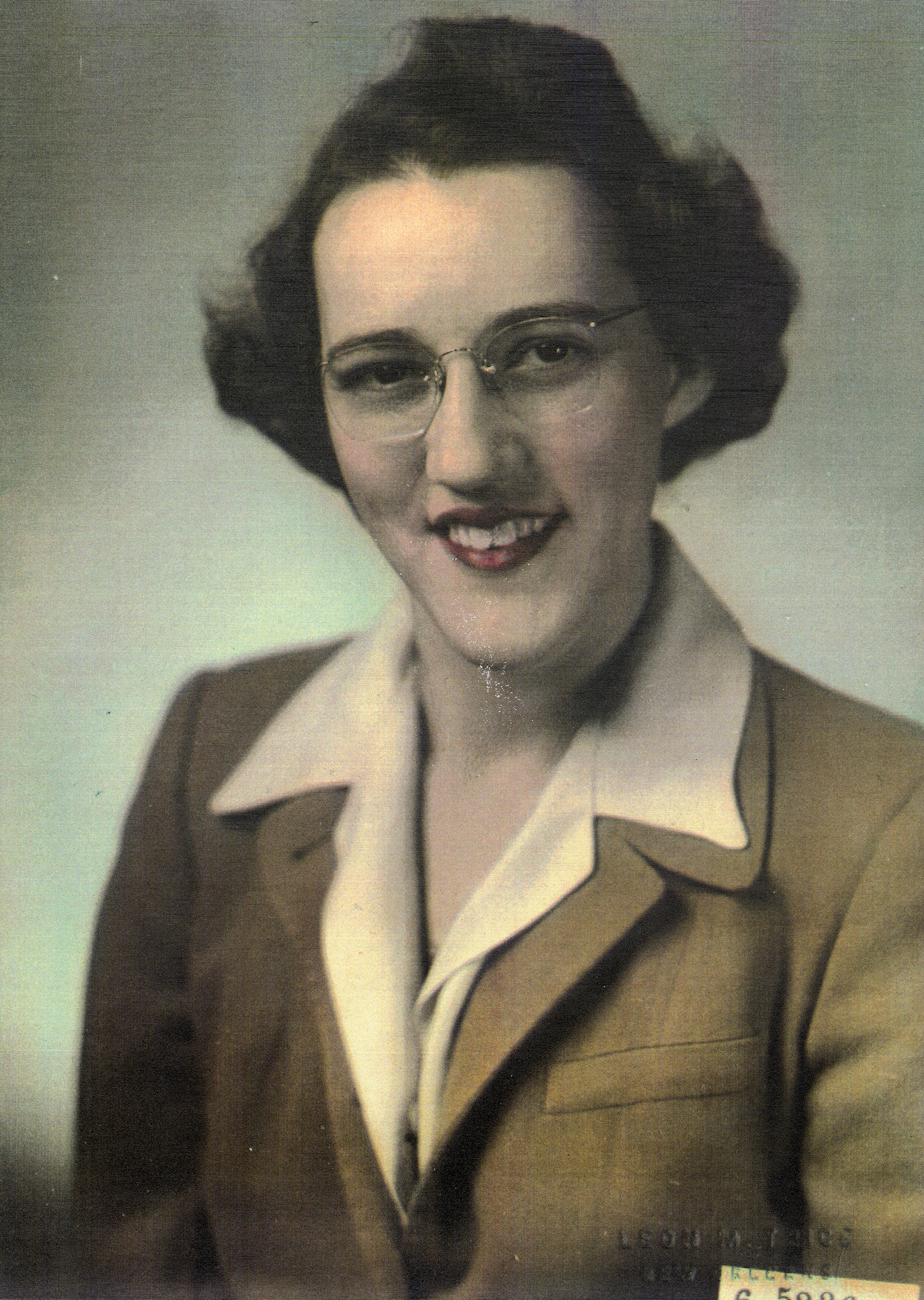
- Janet Mary Riley in 1946
- Born: September 20, 1915; New Orleans, Louisiana, U.S.
- Died: July 5, 2008 (aged 92); New Orleans, Louisiana, U.S.
- Education: Loyola University New Orleans, B.A. 1936, J.D. 1952; Louisiana State University, B.S.; University of Virginia, L.L.M. 1960
- Occupations: Lawyer, librarian

Janet Mary Riley (September 20, 1915 – July 5, 2008) was an American civil rights activist and first female law professor in New Orleans. Riley dedicated her career to social justice reform, where her proposed "equal management" in reference to community property law was adopted by the Louisiana legislature in 1978 and formally incorporated into the Civil Code in 1980. In addition, Janet Mary Riley heavily involved herself with activism regarding the civil rights movement.

== Education ==
Riley obtained a B.A. from Ursuline College, the sister college to Loyola University New Orleans and, years later, a B.S. in Library science from Louisiana State University. She later earned a Juris Doctor degree from Loyola University New Orleans College of Law and an L.L.M from the University of Virginia.

== Academic and legal career ==
Riley taught in the New Orleans Public School System for a short time following her first college degree. After receiving her Library science degree, she became a librarian at the New Orleans Public Library and later an assistant at Loyola's library. During World War II, Riley, like many other women at the time, supported her community by joining the war's cause. She became a librarian in the special services, and returned to her job at Loyola after the war.

In 1945 she began to oversee Loyola's law library, also taking law courses in the evening, graduating with a J.D. in 1952 and being admitted to the bar in 1953. She was then offered a position as law faculty, but at a lower salary than what she'd made as a librarian. Riley took the job as she would be on a 10-month salary (instead of 12) and could aspire to professor status, whereas as a librarian she could only hope to reach assistant professor. She was subsequently hired as a full-time law professor, making her the first female law professor in New Orleans, and only the seventh in the nation. As a professor, Riley encountered sexist behavior from her male legal students, who did not expect to see a woman in the classroom, as well as from colleagues, where she would often hear an opinion she'd expressed (and that had been ignored) later lauded when it came from another (male) colleague.

Riley served on the legal team that defended four people, three of them African-American, who were arrested for sitting at a "whites only" lunch counter at McCrory's in 1960. Riley wrote the brief for the case, Lombard vs. Louisiana, and it was eventually overturned by the Supreme Court, setting a precedent for striking down segregation laws and practices.

In 1971, after she began to teach Community property law, Riley published the case book Louisiana Community Property: Cases and Material on Louisiana Property Law of Marriage. As a result, in 1973 she was asked to chair the subcommittee studying the matrimonial regimes section of the Louisiana Civil Code. At the time, the Louisiana Civil Code "Head and Master" rule gave the husband sole control over community property. Riley actively campaigned for change in the law, speaking to women's groups and at conferences. The Equal Management Law was eventually passed in 1979, and took effect in 1980.

== Activism ==
In addition to her legal work concerning Community property and segregation, Riley also volunteered with the Civil Rights Movement. She served on the Commission on Human Rights of the Catholic Committee of the South, led by Jesuit sociologist, author, social reformer, and Loyola colleague Joseph H. Fichter, S.J. The Commission helped implement the 1953 Archdiocese's order forbidding any further racial segregation in Catholic Churches. In 1947 she served on the Board of Editors for the Louisiana Library Association Bulletin, where she advocated for the admission of African American librarians without limitation to the association. She was also a member of the Community Relations Council, a biracial group focused on the integration of public spaces such as playgrounds and restaurants in New Orleans.

== Personal life ==
Riley was a member of a pontifical secular institute called The Society of Our Lady of the Way where members took vows of poverty, chastity, and obedience.

== Legacy ==
Loyola University New Orleans established the Janet Mary Riley Distinguished Professorship in 2002 from funds donated by Riley and her colleagues. On May 13, 2005, Riley received an Honorary Degree from the Loyola University New Orleans College of Law. Riley's personal papers are held at the Loyola University New Orleans Special Collections & Archives.

Riley's life and work were the subject of an exhibit, "Janet Mary Riley: A Voice for Social Justice in Louisiana," in Special Collections & Archives; a lecture by historian Janet Allured, "Janet Mary Riley: An Angel With Teeth;" and a "Letters Read" event.
