= Henry Hiram Riley =

American politician (1813–1888)

Henry Hiram Riley (born September 1, 1813 - February 8, 1888) was a lawyer, writer, and state senator in Michigan. He established a law practice in Constantine, Michigan.

Riley was born in Great Barrington, Massachusetts. He was orphaned at 10 and lived with his uncle in New Hartford, New York.

== Career ==
Riley was the editor of the Seneca Observer in Waterloo, New York, from 1837 until 1842 when he moved to Kalamazoo, Michigan, studied law for six months, and was admitted to the state bar.

He became a prosecuting attorney and served two terms in the state senate. In 1873 he was appointed to the constitutional commission. He was a Democrat.

Riley authored the Puddleford Papers published in Knickerbocker Magazine and then in book form in 1857, followed by Puddleford and Its People.
