= Kevin Reilly =

Kevin Reilly may refer to:

- Kevin Reilly (American football) (born 1951), NFL player; motivational speaker
- Kevin Reilly (executive), Chief Creative Officer for Turner Entertainment Networks
- Kevin Reilly (Gaelic footballer) (born 1986), Gaelic football player from County Meath
- Kevin P. Reilly (born 1949), sixth president of the University of Wisconsin System

== See also ==
- Kevin Riley (disambiguation)
