= Jack Riley (baseball) =

American baseball player

- Second baseman

Negro league baseball debut
- 1945, for the Birmingham Black Barons

Last appearance
- 1945, for the Birmingham Black Barons

Teams
- Birmingham Black Barons (1945)

James Riley is an American former Negro league second baseman who played in the 1940s.

Riley played for the Birmingham Black Barons in 1945. In five recorded games, he posted one hit in 11 plate appearances.
