= Steven Riley =

English scientist

Steven Riley is a professor of infectious disease dynamics at Imperial College London. He is a member of the Scientific Pandemic Influenza Modelling group (SPI-M) of SAGE. In 2021, he was appointed director general of data and analytics, responsible for surveillance at the UK Health Security Agency (UKHSA).
