= Charles Reilly =

Charles or Charlie Reilly may refer to:

- Charles Nelson Reilly (1931–2007), American actor, comedian, director and drama teacher
- Charles Herbert Reilly (1874–1948), major figure in 20th-century architecture in Britain
- Charlie Reilly (baseball) (1867–1937), American Major League Baseball player
- Charlie Reilly (footballer) (born 2001), Scottish footballer

== See also ==
- Charlie Reilley (1856–1904), American Major League Baseball player
