= Jonathan Riley =

American philosopher

- Born: 1955 (age 70–71)

Education
- Education: Queens University, Kingston (BA), Oxford University (PhD)

Philosophical work
- Era: 21st-century philosophy
- Region: Western philosophy
- School: utilitarianism
- Institutions: Tulane University
- Main interests: utilitarianism

Jonathan Riley is an American philosopher and Professor of Philosophy at Tulane University. He is known for his expertise on utilitarianism.

== Books ==
- Mill's On Liberty, Routledge, 1998, 2015
- Liberal Utilitarianism: Social Choice Theory and J.S. Mill's Philosophy, Cambridge, 1988
