= Dick Riley =

American politician

Richard "Dick" D. Riley
- Born: Richard D. Riley; June 7, 1930; Ayer, Massachusetts
- Died: December 7, 2009 (aged 79)

Member of the New Hampshire Senate
- In office 1964–1968

Richard "Dick" D. Riley (7 June 1930 – 7 December 2009) was a New Hampshire gun shop owner, state senator and political activist.

Between 1964 and 1968 Riley served two terms in the New Hampshire State Senate representing Hooksett.

Riley opened a store, Riley's Sports Shop, in Manchester, New Hampshire in 1953, later moving the store to Hooksett. Riley retired in 1987, selling the store to employees. It changed hands again in 2014 before closing in November 2019.

He was an active target shooter, becoming state muzzle-loading champion between 1958 and 1960. He was president of Gun Owners of New Hampshire, and of the National Rifle Association of America between 1990 and 1992.
