= Thomas Crofton =

Thomas Crofton was an Irish Anglican priest in the 17th century.

Crofton was born in County Roscommon and educated at Trinity College, Dublin. Crofton was ordained in 1641. He was a prebendary of Elphin Cathedral from 1661 to 1668, and of St Patrick's Cathedral, Dublin from 1662; and Dean of Elphin from 1665 holding the latter two positions until his death in 1683.
