= John Ardill =

Irish Anglican priest

John Roche Ardill
- Education: Trinity College, Dublin
- Occupation: Anglican priest

John Roche Ardill was an Anglican priest in Ireland, most notably Dean of Elphin and Ardagh from 1933 to 1944.

Ardill was educated at Trinity College, Dublin and ordained deacon in 1884 and priest in 1885. After curacies in Athlone, Derryvullan and Dublin he held incumbencies in Drumcliff and Calry. He was an Honorary Canon of Elphin Cathedral from 1901 until 1933.
