= Thomas Reilly =

Thomas, Tommy or Tom Reilly may refer to:

- Thomas Devin Reilly (1823–1854), Irish revolutionary, Young Irelander and journalist
- Thomas Reilly (priest) (died 1921), Irish Anglican priest, Dean of Ardagh
- Thomas L. Reilly (1858–1924), U.S. Representative from Connecticut
- Tom Reilly (baseball) (1884–1918), American baseball player
- Thomas J. Riley or Reilly (1885–1928), American college football coach
- Tommy Reilly (harmonica player) (1919–2000), Canadian harmonica player
- Thomas Reilly (Massachusetts politician) (born 1942), American lawyer, Attorney General of Massachusetts
- Tom Reilly (actor) (born 1959), American actor
- Thomas Reilly (academic) (born 1960), American academic
- Tom Reilly (author) (born 1960), Irish author
- Tommy Reilly (Scottish musician) (born 1989), Scottish singer–songwriter
- Thomas Reilly (footballer) (born 1994), Scottish footballer

== See also ==
- Thomas Riley (disambiguation)
- Tom Rielly (born 1966), Iowa state senator
