= John Atherton =

Anglican Bishop

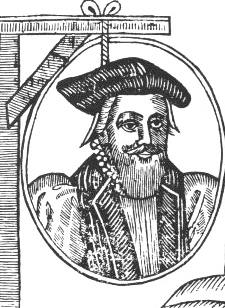
- John Atherton, Bishop of Waterford and Lismore, was hanged for sodomy under a law that he had helped to institute; his proctor John Childe was also hanged. Anonymous pamphlet, 1641.
- Church: Church of Ireland
- Diocese: Diocese of Waterford and Lismore

Orders
- Consecration: 28 May 1636 by Lancelot Bulkeley

Personal details
- Born: 1598 Somerset, England
- Died: 5 December 1640 (aged 41–42) Stephen's Green, Dublin, Ireland
- Education: University of Oxford

John Atherton (1598 – 5 December 1640) was the Bishop of Waterford and Lismore in the Church of Ireland. He and John Childe (his steward and tithe proctor) were both tried and executed for buggery in 1640.

== Life and death ==
=== Early life and education ===
Atherton was born in 1598 in Somerset, England. His father, also named John, was a parson and rector of Bawdrip. The younger Atherton studied at the University of Oxford and joined the ranks of the Anglican clergy, serving as rector of Huish Champflower in Somerset.

=== Career in the Anglican clergy ===
In 1630, Atherton became prebendary of the Church of St John the Evangelist in Dublin, as well as chancellor of the Diocese of Killaloe. He became chancellor of Christ Church Cathedral in 1634 and rector of Killaban and Ballintubride in 1635.

In 1636, under the patronage of Lord Strafford, the Lord Deputy of Ireland, he became Bishop of Waterford and Lismore, over the protests of the Roman Catholic majority in his see.

The Buggery Act of 1533 having been found not to apply in Ireland in 1631 (during the Castlehaven case), Atherton pushed for the enactment of "An Act for the Punishment for the Vice of Buggery" in 1634.

=== Downfall ===
In 1640 Atherton was accused of buggery with a man, John Childe, his steward and tithe proctor. Even though his fellow clerics attempted to prevent his trial to save the reputation of his church, they were the first to have been tried under the law that Atherton himself had helped to institute.

They were found guilty and both condemned to death, to the applause of the crowd, with Atherton being nearly lynched on his way to prison at Cork.

Nicholas Bernard, Dean of Elphin and Ardagh, acted as his spiritual counselor and wrote an account of Atherton's final days. Atherton was executed by hanging on Oxmantown Green, Dublin, after reading the morning service for his cellmates. Reportedly, he confessed the crime to the priest ministering to him immediately before his execution, although he had proclaimed his innocence before that and kept doing so during the execution.

== Legacy ==
=== Character assassination and conspiracy ===
Since 1710, some historical evidence has been adduced that Atherton was a victim of a conspiracy to discredit him and his patrons. This was attributable to Atherton's status, as an astute lawyer, who sought to recover lost land for the relatively weak Protestant Church of Ireland during the 1630s. Unfortunately for Atherton, this alienated him from large landowners, who then allegedly used his sexuality to discredit him. The conspiracy has been alleged to have been led by a lawyer named Butler, over land in Killoges, near Waterfeld. Butler became insane after the execution, claiming to see Atherton at all time.

English Puritan, Congregationalist and Independent activists, as well as English and Scottish Presbyterian activists, contemporaneously campaigned to abolish Episcopacy (bishops) within the embattled Church of England, Church of Scotland and Church of Ireland; notionally expediting the political interest in Atherton's downfall.

Posthumous accusations of sexual wrongdoing also include allegations of "incest" with his sister-in-law, and infanticide of the resultant child, as well as zoophilia with cattle. However, these allegations began to be circulated several months after his death in an anonymous pamphlet, and may have been intended to further discredit the bishop's campaign to restore the finances of the Church of Ireland.

=== Legends ===
A legend had him linked to the Old Mother Leakey, a Somerset ghost accused of shipwrecking.

Another legend describes the house of Butler, the lawyer who allegedly led the conspiracy against Atherton, as being haunted by the ghost of the bishop.

== See also ==
- List of people executed for homosexuality
