= Usher Tighe =

Irish Anglican cleric

Hugh Ussher Tighe (b Castletowndevlin 27 February 1802 – d Newtownstewart 11 August 1874) was a Dean of the Church of Ireland.

He was educated at Corpus Christi College, Oxford and ordained deacon in 1826 and priest in 1827. He began his ecclesiastical career with a curacy at Longbridge Deverill. After this he was the Rector of Clonmore then a Chaplain to Thomas de Grey, 2nd Earl de Grey, Lord Lieutenant of Ireland.

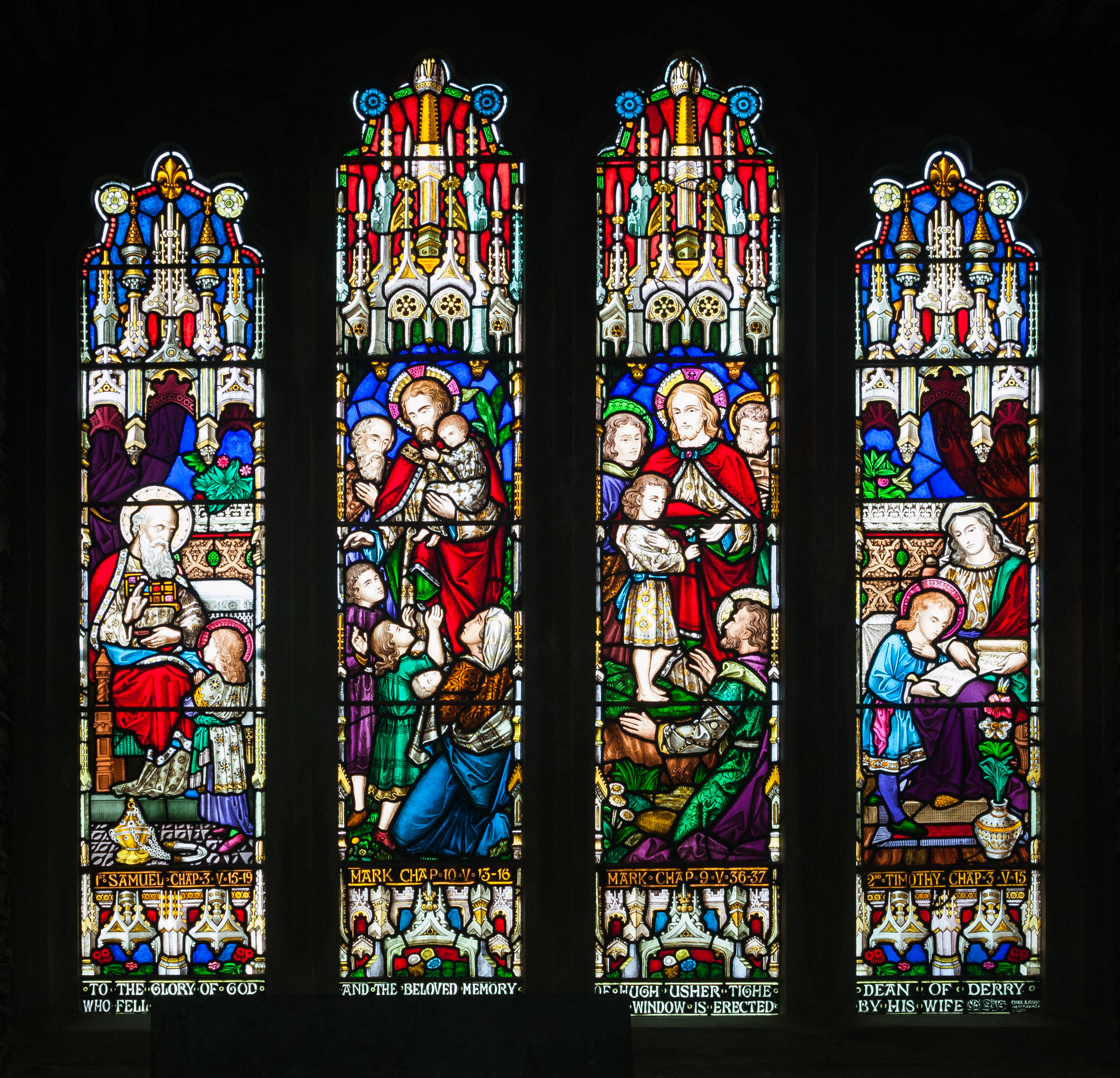
Stained glass window in memory of Hugh Usher Tighe in St Columb's Cathedral

Tighe became Dean of Leighlin, then Dean of Ardagh and Dean of the Chapel Royal, and finally Dean of Derry in 1860. He died in 1874 and was buried in Drumcar. A stained glass window by Charles Alexander Gibbs was donated by his wife in St Columb's Cathedral.

Church of Ireland titles
Preceded by Richard Boyle Bernard	Dean of Leighlin; 1850–1854	Succeeded by James Lyster
Preceded by Charles Augustus Vignoles	Deans of the Chapel Royal, Dublin; 1843–1860	Succeeded by Charles Graves
Preceded by Richard Murray	Dean of Ardagh; 1854–1858	Succeeded by Augustus William West
Preceded by Thomas Bunbury Gough	Dean of Derry; 1860–1874	Succeeded by Charles Seymour
