= David Griscome =

Anglican priest

David Griscome (born 1947) was an Anglican priest in Ireland, most notably Dean of Elphin and Ardagh from 1999 to 2004.

Griscome was educated at Oak Hill Theological College and ordained deacon in 1989 and priest in 1990. After a curacy at Glendermott he held incumbencies at Cashel, Calry, Sligo.
