= John Oldfield (priest) =

John Orson Oldfield (24 June 1781;20 October 1860) was an Irish Anglican priest.

Oldfield was born in Lismore, County Waterford and educated at Trinity College, Dublin. He was appointed Archdeacon of Elphin in 1823 Oldfield resigned in 1845 for the Prebendal Stall of Ballintubber in Elphin Cathedral.
