= Thomas Riley =

Thomas or Tom Riley may refer to:

== Public officials ==
- Thomas W. Riley (c. 1804–1872), American political figure in Kentucky
- Thomas S. Riley (1852–1938), American attorney general in West Virginia
- Tom Riley (Iowa politician) (1929–2011), lawyer and member of state House and Senate
- Thomas T. Riley (born 1949), American ambassador to Morocco from 2003 to 2009
- Thomas Riley (Pennsylvania politician), chairman of Convention Center Authority Board from 2007 to 2011
- Thomas P. Riley (1875–1928), American politician and jurist in Massachusetts

== Sportsmen ==
- Tom Riley (footballer) (1882–1942), English full-back
- Thomas J. Riley (1885–1928), American football player, coach and attorney
- Tom Riley (soccer), Canadian who won one cap in 1975
- Tom Riley (rugby union) (born 1985), Welsh centre

== Others ==
- Thomas Riley (Medal of Honor), Irish-born American Civil War Medal of Honor 1865 recipient
- Tom Riley (tattoo artist) (1870–after 1902), English tattoo artist, nicknamed "Professor"
- Thomas Joseph Riley (1900–1977), American Roman Catholic auxiliary bishop
- Thomas F. Riley (1912–1998), American Marine Corps brigadier general
- Tom Riley (actor) (born 1981), English performer, producer and director

== Characters ==
- Tommy Riley, protagonist of 2004 American film Fighting Tommy Riley

== See also ==
- Tom Rielly (born 1966), American state senator in Iowa
- Thomas Reilly (disambiguation)
