= James Wilson (Dean of Elphin and Ardagh) =

Irish Anglican priest

James Wilson was an Anglican priest in Ireland, most notably Dean of Elphin and Ardagh from 1954 to 1963.

Wilson was educated at Trinity College, Dublin and ordained deacon in 1900 and priest in 1903. After curacies in Clontibret, Trory and Tyholland he held incumbencies at Brantry, Columbkille, Drumcliff and Lissadell. He was Prebendary of Tibohine in Elphin Cathedral from 1949 to 1953.
