= Alexander Fraser, 17th Lord Saltoun =

Scottish representative peer and British Army general

Lieutenant-General The Right Honourable The Lord Saltoun KT GCH KCB
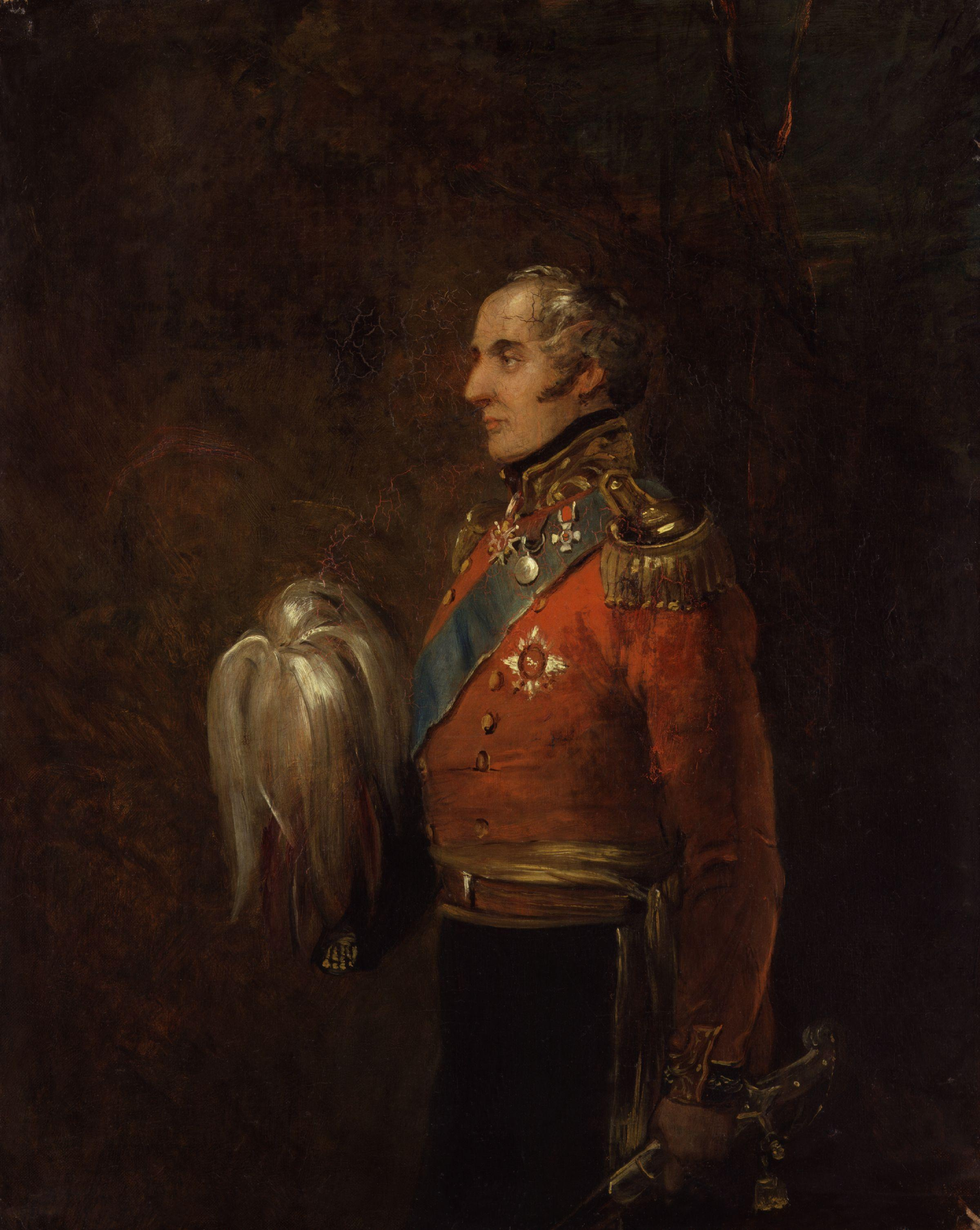
- Portrait by William Salter, c. 1837
- Born: 22 April 1785; London, England
- Died: 18 August 1853 (aged 68); Rothes, Scotland
- Burial place: Fraserburgh, Scotland
- Military career
- Allegiance: United Kingdom
- Branch: British Army
- Rank: Lieutenant-General
- Conflicts: Napoleonic Wars; Walcheren Campaign; Peninsular War; Battle of Corunna; Siege of Cádiz; Battle of the Bidassoa; Battle of Nivelle; Battle of the Nive; Passage of the Adour; Battle of Bayonne; Hundred Days; Battle of Waterloo (WIA); Storming of Peronne (WIA); First Opium War; Battle of Chinkiang

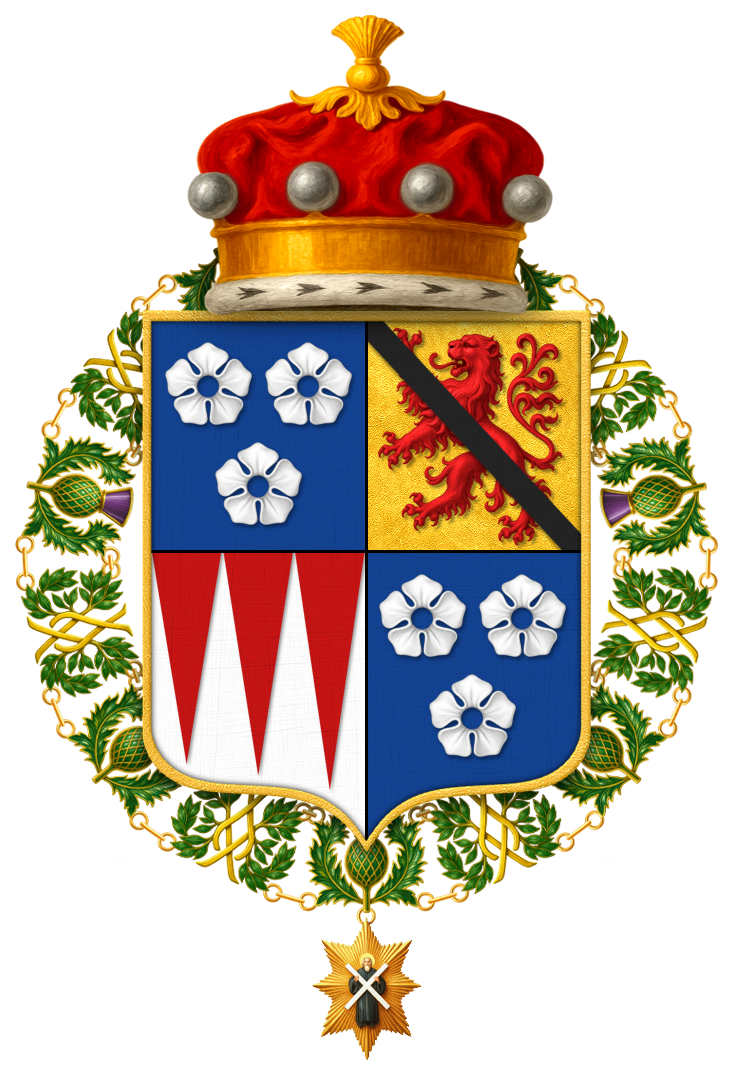
Shield of Arms of Alexander George Fraser, 17th Lord Saltoun, KT, KCB, GCH

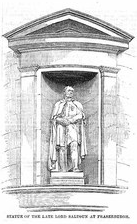
Drawing of statue by Edward Bowring Stephens (1815–1882) of Lt-Gen. Alexander Fraser, 17th Lord Saltoun (1785–1853) at Fraserburgh Town House

Lieutenant-General Alexander George Fraser, 17th Lord Saltoun, KT, GCH, KCB (22 April 1785 – 18 August 1853) was a Scottish representative peer and a British Army general who fought in the Napoleonic Wars and the First Opium War.

== Biography ==
He served with the grenadiers in Sicily (1806), at Coruna (1808), on Walcheren (1809), and in Spain and France from 1812 to 1814. In 1815, Lord Saltoun fought as a captain in the First Regiment of Guards (later the Grenadier Guards) in the Orchard at Hougomont on the morning of the Battle of Waterloo. During the battle he had four horses shot from underneath him.

"Towards the close of Waterloo day he returned to his place in the line with about but one-third of the men with whom he had gone into action. He then took a prominent part in the last celebrated charge of the Guards."

Following Waterloo he was created both a Knight of St. George of Russia (KStG) and also a knight of the Austrian Military Order of Maria Theresa (KMT).

Fraser was described by Wellington as a "pattern to the army both as man and soldier."

He was appointed a Knight Grand Cross of the Royal Guelphic Order (GCH) in 1821 and a Knight of the Thistle in 1852. He was a Scottish representative peer from 1807 until his death and a Lord of the Bedchamber from 1821.

He was promoted to the rank of major-general in 1837 and later commanded the first brigade in the Battle of Chinkiang (1842) during the First Opium War and afterwards the whole force until 1843. He was further promoted to lieutenant-general in 1849.

== Family ==
He was the son of Alexander Fraser, 16th Lord Saltoun (1758–1793) and Margaret, only daughter of Simon Fraser of Ness Castle. Fraser married the daughter of Lord Chancellor Thurlow. Fraser died in Rothes, Scotland on 18 August 1853.

== Notes ==
Military offices
Preceded by Sir William Henry Clinton	Colonel of the 55th (Westmorland) Regiment of Foot; 1846	Succeeded by John Wardlaw
Preceded by Sir James Kempt	Colonel of the 2nd (The Queen's Royal) Regiment of Foot; 1846–1853	Succeeded by Sir John Rolt
Peerage of Scotland
Preceded by Alexander Fraser	Lord Saltoun; 1793–1853	Succeeded by Alexander Fraser
