= John Wardlaw =

John Wardlaw was an Irish Anglican priest.

Wardlaw was born in County Cavan and educated at Trinity College, Dublin. He held livings at Killukin and Tunnagh. Wardlaw was appointed Archdeacon of Elphin in 1769 and held the post until 1781. He was then Prebendary of Tullabracky in Limerick Cathedral from 1781 until 1784. He died in 1801, and is buried in a vault adjoining the ruin of Meelick Church, Punchbowl, Co. Clare.
