= Erasmus Matthews =

Irish Anglican cleric

Erasmus Matthews was a 17th-century Irish Anglican clergyman.

Matthews was ordained deacon on 13 September 1613; and priest on 26 February 1614. He held the Vicarages of Tawnagh and Aghanagh was collated Archdeacon of Elphin on 10 October 1615 and served throughout 1616 and 1617.
