= George Bolton =

George Bolton may refer to:

- George Washington Bolton (1841–1931), American politician
- Sir George Bolton (banker) (1900–1982), British banker
- George Bolton (trade unionist) (born 1934), former communist and leader of the Scottish Area of the National Union of Mineworkers
- George Bolton (priest) (1905–1968), Anglican priest in Ireland
- George Bolton, character in The Adventures of Smilin' Jack (serial)
