= Thomas Gough (priest) =

Ven. Thomas Bunbury Gough (13 June 1777 – 8 May 1860) was an Anglo-Irish priest who was Dean of Derry in the Church of Ireland for four decades.

Gough was born in County Limerick into an Anglo-Irish family that had moved from Wiltshire to Ireland in the 17th century. His younger brother was Field-Marshal Hugh Gough, 1st Viscount Gough. He was educated at Trinity College, Dublin. He married Hon. Charlotte Bloomfield, daughter of 2nd Viscount Jocelyn, granddaughter of Lord Chancellor Robert Jocelyn, 1st Viscount Jocelyn, and sister of Benjamin Bloomfield, 1st Baron Bloomfield. His sons were Gen. Sir John Bloomfield Gough of the Indian Army, George Gough of the Bengal Civil Service, and Col. Thomas Bunbury Gough, who was killed in Battle of the Great Redan in the Crimean War; and Rev. Benjamin Gough, who was also Dean of Derry.

He was Chancellor of Ardfert from 1811 until 1815; and Dean of Derry from 1820 until his death at the deanery 40 years later.

Church of Ireland titles
Preceded by James Saurin	Dean of Derry; 1820–1860	Succeeded by Usher Tighe
