= Augustus West (priest) =

Irish Anglican priest

Augustus William West, J.P. (22 July 1813 in Dublin – 3 March 1893 in Presteigne) was a nineteenth century Anglican priest, most notably Dean of Ardagh from 1860 until 1880.

He was educated at Trinity College, Dublin. He was for many years Rector of Blessington; and Chancellor of Kildare. He also held the living of Presteigne.
