= John Beresford (dean of Elphin and Ardagh) =

Anglican priest in Ireland

John Claudius Beresford was an Anglican priest in Ireland, most notably Dean of Elphin and Ardagh from 1944 to 1954.

Beresford was educated at Trinity College, Dublin and ordained deacon in 1897 and priest in 1898. After a curacy in Drumgoon he held incumbencies in Bailieborough and Kiltoraght.
