= Benjamin Gough =

Benjamin Bloomfield Gough (20 January 1814 – 13 December 1893) was a nineteenth-century Anglican priest in the Church of Ireland.

Gough was born in County Tipperary to an Anglo-Irish family that had moved from Wiltshire to Ireland in the 17th century. He was the fourth son of Thomas Bunbury Gough, Dean of Derry, and Hon. Charlotte Bloomfield, granddaughter of Lord Chancellor Viscount Jocelyn. His uncles were Field-Marshal Hugh Gough, 1st Viscount Gough and Benjamin Bloomfield, 1st Baron Bloomfield. His elder brothers were Gen. Sir John Bloomfield Gough of the Indian Army, George Gough of the Bengal Civil Service, and Col. Thomas Bunbury Gough, who was killed in Battle of the Great Redan in the Crimean War.

He was educated at Corpus Christi College, Cambridge, graduating BA in 1835 and Master of Arts in 1842.

Gough was the curate at Culdaff; Rector of Dunboe; of then the Archdeacon of Derry from 1846 until his resignation in 1849. He then held incumbencies at Urney and Maghera.
