= Hugh Mortimer =

Irish Anglican priest

Hugh Sterling Mortimer was an Anglican priest in Ireland, most notably Dean of Elphin and Ardagh from 1983 to 1991.

Mortimer was born in 1923 and educated at Trinity College, Dublin. He was ordained deacon in 1946 and priest in 1947. After a curacy in Finaghy he was Dean's Vicar of St Anne's Cathedral, Belfast from 1949 to 1953; and Vicar choral from 1953 to 1955. He was the Incumbent at Tartaraghan from 1955 to 1961; and of Magherafelt from 1961 to 1966. He was Rector of Armagh from 1966 to 1983. He died in 2007.
