= Alexander Kearney =

Irish Anglican clergyman

Alexander Major Kearney was an Irish Anglican clergyman.

Kearney was educated at Trinity College Dublin; and ordained in 1865. After a curacy in Mohill he became the incumbent at St John Sligo in 1876. He was Archdeacon of Elphin from 1880 until 1904; and the Dean of Elphin from then until his death on 8 April 1912.
