= George Bolton (priest) =

Irish Anglican priest

George Holmes Gibson Bolton (1905–1968) was an Anglican priest in Ireland, most notably Dean of Elphin and Ardagh from 1963 to 1967.

Bolton was educated at Trinity College, Dublin and ordained deacon in 1930 and priest in 1931. After curacies in Dublin and Derryheen he held incumbencies at Newtowngore and Mohill. He was Prebendary of Tibohine in Elphin Cathedral from 1956 to 1963.
