= Thomas Reilly (priest) =

Irish Anglican dean

Thomas Reilly was Dean of Ardagh from 1913 until 1920.

He was educated at Trinity College, Dublin and ordained deacon in 1876 and priest in 1877. He began his ecclesiastical career with a curacy at Kilashee. After this he was the Incumbent of Cashel from 1878 until 1882. He then returned to Kilashee, staying until 1900 when he took charge of Rathaspick with Russagh, a post he held until his appointment to the Deanery.

He died in April 1921.

Church of Ireland titles
Preceded by Frederic Potterton	Dean of Ardagh; 1912–1920	Succeeded by William Moore (bishop since 1915)
