= Nicholas Bernard =

English priest and author (c. 1600–1661)

- Born: c. 1600
- Died: 15 October 1661
- Education: Bachelor of Arts, Emmanuel College, 1620
- Occupations: Priest and author

Nicholas Bernard (c. 1600–1661) was an Anglican priest and author during the 17th century. A dean in Ireland at the time of the Rebellion of 1641, he wrote descriptions of current events. He was also the biographer of James Ussher.

== Biography ==
Nicholas Bernard was born around 1600. He was educated at Emmanuel College in Cambridge, graduating with a Bachelors of Arts in 1620.

In 1626, having migrated to Ireland, Bernard was ordained by Archbishop James Ussher, Archbishop of Armagh from 1625 to 1656, in St. Peter's church, Drogheda. He became Ussher's chaplain and librarian. In 1627 he became Dean of Kilmore, a titular position. He was incorporated at Oxford in 1628 as well as becoming the Rector of St. Peter, Drogheda. In 1637 he exchanged with Henry Jones the deanery of Kilmore for that of Ardagh, making him the Dean of Ardagh, he also became prebendary of Dromore. He continued to be the dean until 1641, when he had to flee to England during the rebellion.

He attended Bishop John Atherton, executed in 1640, in his last days, and wrote an account., which became a popular chap-book. Atherton was convicted of sexual offences; there was a background in church politics, and historians believe that Bernard's writing points to the context behind the scandal, as well as being a tract on repentance.

In connection with the rebellion he wrote pamphlets, about the events in Drogheda and County Louth, and at Derry. In 1647 he preached in London, but came to the attention of the Committee for Plundered Ministers. They took exception to his not having a licence to preach, and Bernard spent time in the Fleet Prison.

He left Ireland around 1649, was appointed preacher of Gray's Inn in 1651, and became chaplain and almoner to Oliver Cromwell. When Ussher died in 1655, Bernard took care of the funeral expenses, and in 1656 published the Life and Death of Archbishop Ussher in a Sermon preached at his Funeral at Westminster, 1656. A further apologetical work on behalf of Ussher he published in 1657 mentioned Peter Heylin, who replied to both works. Bernard opposed the Laudian position, according to which the Papacy was not to be identified with the Antichrist.

In 1660 John Egerton, 2nd Earl of Bridgewater as patron appointed Bernard rector of Whitchurch, and he declined to return to Ardagh. He continued to write, including a work on William Bedell. He died on 15 October 1661.

== Published works ==
- 1640: The penitent death of a woeful sinner
- 1642: The whole proceedings of the Siege of Drogheda
- 1648: The still-borne nativity
- 1656: The life and death of the most reverend and learned father of our church, Dr James Ussher
- 1659: Certain discourses of Babylon
- 1660: Devotions of the ancient church in seven pious prayers
- 1661: Clavi trabales
