= Clement Paman =

English poet (??–1664)

Clement Paman (d.1664) was an English poet and clergyman of the 17th century sometimes associated with the Cavalier Poets in the tradition of Ben Jonson and Thomas Carew. He was described in 1994 as "perhaps the most talented poet of the seventeenth century never to have had a poem published over his name."

== Life ==
He was probably born in Dalham, Suffolk. The Paman family are listed in the parish registers of nearby Chevington and his father Robert Paman is noted in a 1740 book as having lived at Dunstall Green, Dalham, Suffolk. The Pamans appear to have been well-off but untitled country gentry. Manuscripts survive of letters he sent to his brother, also called Robert. It also seems likely that he was related to the physicist Henry Paman who was his contemporary at Cambridge.

Clement Paman was an early student of the Puritan Sidney Sussex College (founded 1596) at the University of Cambridge, where he obtained a BA in 1632, an MA in 1635 and later Doctor of Divinity. William White in The Book Collector follows Alumni Cantabrigienses in saying Paman was 16 when he first matriculated in 1631/2, making his date of birth c.1615.

He became a personal chaplain, initially to Sir Henry North, 1st Baronet. A manuscript at Harvard University identifies him as later being the chaplain to Thomas Wentworth, 1st Earl of Strafford, the Lord Deputy of Ireland. Later in his career, he was prebendary of St Patrick's Cathedral, Dublin from 1661 to 1663 and Dean of Elphin Cathedral, Ireland between 1662 and his death in 1664. He has a memorial at Sidney Sussex College.

Peter Davidson, in his introduction to Poetry and Revolution, describes him as a "moderate Protestant", although in Christian Humanism and the Puritan Social Order, Margo Todd goes as far to call him an "ultra-royalist cleric". However, she notes that his writings on Christian charity are liberal for their time, quoting his suggestion that alms should be given "even to the loose and impious".

== Works ==
Only three of his poems were published in the seventeenth century and the majority of his poems exist in manuscript collections in the Bodleian Library; N. Postlethwaite and G. Campbell noted in 1994 he remains "the enthusiasm of those who are familiar with the manuscript collections of seventeenth century poetry." He has since featured in a few anthologies such as Poetry and Revolution: An Anthology of British and Irish Verse (1998) and a very limited print run of some previously unpublished manuscript poems was published in 2002 by the Foundling Press.

His poems are mainly of a devotional nature; perhaps his best-known work is "On Christmas Day to My Heart", a poem from c.1660 held by the British Library which was anthologised in the 1940 Oxford Book of Christian Verse, Norman Ault's A Treasury of Unfamiliar Lyrics (1938) and was set to music by Richard Rodney Bennett for the 1999 Festival of Nine Lessons and Carols.

Other titles include his "Poem on the Death of Edward King"; "Here lies Wise and Valiant Dust"., "Good Friday", "On Christmas Day 1661", "On his death" and a lengthy tribute to Ben Jonson.

Peter Davidson notes that Paman's style is complex, "abounding in extended metaphors" and more "overly Baroque" than some of his contemporaries, being a development of the "epigrammatic style of Jonson". Rhodes Dunlap notes that his "copious lyrics", which at the time were mostly in manuscript, are "uneven in quality".
