= Alexander Orme =

Irish Anglican cleric

Alexander Orme (20 June 1813 – 8 November 1896) was Dean of Ardagh from 1880 until his death.

He was educated at Trinity College Dublin and ordained deacon in 1838 and priest in 1839. He was for many years the Rector of Moydow.
