= Stuart McGee =

Anglican priest

Stuart Irwin McGee (1930–2013) was an Anglican priest.

McGee was educated at Trinity College, Dublin and ordained deacon in 1953 and priest in 1954. After curacies in Belfast and Singapore he was the incumbent at Ballintra from 1958 to 1965. He was a Chaplain to the Forces from 1965 to 1988, latterly as Assistant Chaplain General. He was at Tubbercurry from 1988 until his appointment as Dean of Elphin and Ardagh in 1992. He retired in post in 1999.
