= William French (priest) =

Irish Anglican priest

William French (26 September 1704 – 16 January 1785) was an Anglican priest, most notably the Dean of Ardagh from 1769 until his death.

He was born in County Roscommon and educated at Trinity College Dublin. His daughter Elizabeth was the second wife of Joseph Leeson, 1st Earl of Milltown.
