= Thomas Riley (Pennsylvania politician) =

American lawyer

Thomas "Buck" Riley

Chairman of the Pennsylvania Convention Center Authority Board
- In office May 23, 2007 – May 15, 2011
- Preceded by: Michael Nutter
- Succeeded by: Greg Fox^{[a]}

Personal details
- Party: Republican
- Education: St. Joseph's University; Villanova University School of Law
- Profession: Attorney
- a. As Vice-Chairman of the Board, Carl Singley succeeded Riley as Acting Chair until Fox was elected Riley's permanent successor on May 18.

Thomas A. "Buck" Riley is an American attorney and member of the Republican Party. He served as Chairman of the Pennsylvania Convention Center Authority Board from 2007 to 2011.

== Convention Center Board ==
Riley was elected Chairman of the Pennsylvania Convention Center Authority Board in May 2007. His election followed the resignation of Philadelphia City Councilman and Democrat Michael Nutter as Chair in April of that year, in preparation for his ultimately successful mayoral candidacy.

He resigned as Chairman in May 2011. His resignation was met with surprise from many, as it came just two months before the scheduled opening of a $786 million expansion to the Convention Center. He cited exhaustion as the primary reason behind his resignation.

=== Lawsuit ===
Riley's name appeared in a 39-page legal complaint filed by the Convention Center's former Chief Financial Officer (CFO). The suit asserts that Ameenah Young, the Convention Center's Chief Executive Officer (CEO), steered a contract to a friend, instead of the required low-bidder, as the law requires. It is also alleged that Young spent $1 million in public money on a party to open an addition to the Convention Center, stole food from the Convention Center for use during private parties, and used a Convention Center credit card for political fund-raising parties. The former CFO, who was fired in September 2010, contends in the suit that her employment was terminated in an attempt to keep such violations from coming to light. Riley has since publicly defended Young against all charges contained in the suit.

== Private practice ==
He was chairman and CEO of Riley Riper Hollin & Colagreco, an Exton-based firm he founded in 1984. The firm specializes in land use, zoning and real estate law. He is now retired. Throughout his practice, he was noted for a special devotion to St. Katherine Drexel.
