= Thomas Reilly (academic) =

American academic and public administrator

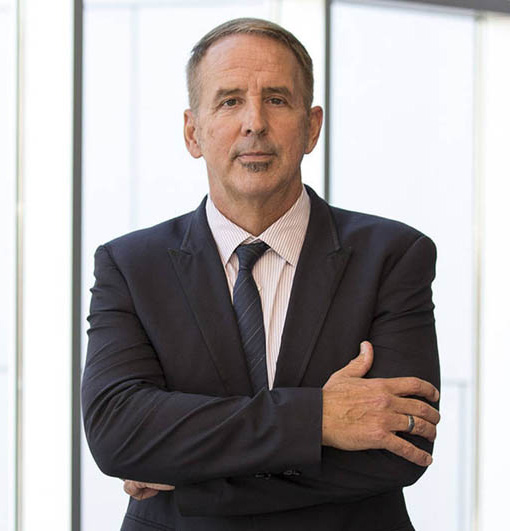
- Born: December 29, 1960 (age 65); Philadelphia, Pennsylvania
- Education: University of Memphis; Arizona State University; University of Southern California
- Occupations: Academic, higher education chancellor, public administrator
- Spouse: Jim Moore

Thomas “Thom” Reilly (born December 29, 1960) is an American academic, higher education chancellor, and public administrator. He is a professor in the School of Public Affairs and co-director for the Center for an Independent and Sustainable Democracy at Arizona State University. He is the former chancellor of the Nevada System of Higher Education, chief executive officer/county manager for Clark County, Nevada, which includes the Las Vegas Valley, and head of the child-welfare system for Nevada.

== Biography ==
Reilly was born in Philadelphia, Pennsylvania, and grew up in Memphis, Tennessee, the third oldest of seven siblings. He graduated from the University of Memphis in 1983 with a bachelor's degree. He earned a master's degree in social work from Arizona State University in 1986, and later attended the University of Southern California where he earned a master of public administration degree in 1997 and a doctor of public administration degree in 1998.

== Career ==
Reilly has held a variety of roles in both the public and private sectors. He headed the Nevada child welfare system from 1991 to 1996. Reilly served five years as county manager for Clark County in Nevada from 2001 to 2006, during which time he oversaw a budget of approximately $5.8 billion.

His private sector experience includes a role as corporate vice president for Social Responsibility for Harrah's Entertainment, from 2006 to 2007. He served as executive director of the Caesars Foundation from 2007 to 2017.

Reilly was a professor and director of the School of Social Work at San Diego State University from 2008 to 2014.

From 2006 to 2017, he also was managing principal at The Reilly Group, a managing consulting firm.

In 2014, Reilly was named director of the Morrison Institute for Public Policy at Arizona State University. During this time, he also was a professor in the university's School of Public Affairs.

Reilly is the former chancellor of the Nevada System of Higher Education. He was the twelfth and chancellor of the Nevada System of Higher Education, having succeeded John Valery White on August 7, 2017. As chancellor is oversaw two research universities, a state college, four community colleges and one research institute within Nevada. He was appointed by the Board of Regents in August 2017. He also is a professor emeritus at San Diego State University.

== Committees ==
Reilly serves on the board for the international NGO,"Our Team - Global Outreach Doctors". and is on the Board of Directors for Children Action Alliance. He is a former member of the Nevada Supreme Court Blue Ribbon Commission on Child Welfare. In November 2018, he was named as a member of Nevada Governor-elect Steve Sisolak’s transition advisory committee.

He is a former member of the board of directors for Clean The World, and he previously served on the board for the Gay and Lesbian Alliance Against Defamation (GLAAD), including a stint as chair and secretary of the board. He was elected as a Fellow of the National Academy of Public Administration (NAPA) in 2005.

== Publications ==
In addition to publishing numerous articles in academic journals on the topics of public pay and benefits, child welfare, and governance, Reilly’s columns and op-eds have appeared in a variety of American publications, including NPR's "Here and Now," PBS NewsHour, CNN Money, ABC World News, “This Week with George Stephanopoulos”, Fox Business News, and in the Wall Street Journal, USA Today, Forbes, The Guardian, Law 360, Governing, Businessweek, The Fulcrum and The Associated Press,Governing, the Arizona Republic, the San Diego Union-Tribune, the Reno Gazette Journal, and the Las Vegas Sun.

He has had three books published and authored several book chapters. In 2012, Rethinking Public Sector Compensation: What Ever Happened to the Public Interest?, Reilly's first book, was published by M.E. Sharpe Publishing, Inc.,/Taylor & Francis Group. In 2016, Reilly's second book – The Failure of Governance in Bell, California: Big Time Corruption in a Small Town – was published by Lexington Books, an imprint of The Rowman & Littlefield Publishing Group. The Independent Voter (forthcoming September 2022) with co-authors Jackie Salit & Omar Ali is being published by Routledge Press (Francis & Taylor Group).

He also has edited two books: Pensions: Policies, New Reforms and Current Challenges in 2014, and The Governance of Local Communities: Global Perspectives and Challenges in 2017.

== Awards ==
In 2016, Reilly received the Anti-Corruption Award from the New York City Independence Clubs, Inc., for his work in researching independent voters with the Morrison Institute for Public Policy.
