= Frederic Potterton =

Anglican member of the clergy

Frederic Augustus Potterton was an Anglican priest, most notably Archdeacon then Dean of Ardagh.

He was educated at Trinity College, Dublin and ordained deacon in 1856 and priest in 1857. He served curacies at Killukin, Mostrim, Ardagh and Killoe. He was the Incumbent of Clonbroney from 1872 to 1889; Archdeacon of Ardagh from 1891 to 1896; and Dean of Ardagh from 1896 until his death in 1912.
