= Dean of Elphin and Ardagh =

Church of Ireland official

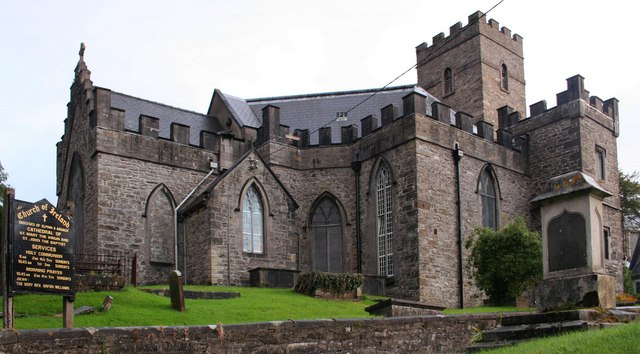
St John the Baptist Cathedral, Sligo

The Dean of Elphin and Ardagh is based in St John the Baptist Cathedral, Sligo in the Diocese of Elphin and Ardagh within the united bishopric of Kilmore, Elphin and Ardagh of the Church of Ireland. The dioceses of Elphin and Ardagh were merged in 1841. The original cathedral had been destroyed by military action in 1496 and the original diocesan cathedral was damaged by a storm in 1957 and abandoned in 1961.

The current incumbent is The Very Reverend A. Williams.

== Deans of Elphin ==
- Malachi O'Flanagan: ? – 1587
- Thomas O'Heidegein: 1587
- Thomas Burke: 1591–1603
- Edward King: 1603 (later Bishop of Elphin)
- Eriell O'Higgin: 1606
- John Evatt: 1613–1633
- 1634 Richard Jones: 1634
- Joseph Ware: 1642–1648
- Edward Synge: ? – 1661 (afterwards Bishop of Limerick, Ardfert and Aghadoe)
- Clement Paman: 1661–1664 (poet)
- Daniel Neyland: 1664
- 1665 Thomas Crofton: 1665
- Anthony Cope: 1683–1700 (afterwards Dean of Connor)
- Edward Goldsmith: 1700–1723
- Peter Mahon: 1723–1739
- Christopher Lloyd: 1739–1757
- James Dickson: 1757–1768 (afterwards Dean of Down)
- Robert Bligh: 1768–1778
- John Barry: 1778–1794
- Francis Browne: 1794–1797
- John French: 1797–1848
- William Warburton: 1848–1894
- Francis Burke: 1894–1900
- Alexander Kearney: 1904–1912

== Deans of Ardagh ==
- John Bowerman: 1552
- 1563 William Brady: 1563
- Robert Richardson: 1595
- Lewis Jones: 1606–1625 (also Dean of Cashel)
- Henry Jones: 1625–1637 (son of above; afterwards Dean of Kilmore)
- Nicholas Bernard: 1637 – ? (fled to England 1641; later chaplain to Oliver Cromwell)
- John Kerb/Carr: 1661–1701
- John Barton: 1701
- Charles Cobbe: 1718–1720 (afterwards Bishop of Killala and Achonry)
- Josiah Hort: 1720–1721 (afterwards Bishop of Ferns)
- Robert Howard: 1721 (later Bishop of Killala and Achonry)
- Lewis Saurin: 1727–1749 (d. 1749)
- George Sandford: 1749–1757
- Thomas White: 1757–1769
- William French: 1769–1785
- Lilly Butler: 1785–1790
- Charles Mongan Warburton: 1790–1800 (afterwards Dean of Clonmacnoise, later Bishop of Limerick, Ardfert and Aghadoe)
- The Hon. Richard Bourke: 1800–1813 (afterwards Bishop of Waterford and Lismore 1813)
- Richard Graves: 1814–1829
- Richard Murray: 1829–1854
- Usher Tighe: 1854–1860 (afterwards Dean of Derry)
- Augustus William West: 1860–1880
- Alexander Orme: 1880–1896
- Frederic Potterton: 1896–1912 (d. 1912)
- Thomas Reilly: 1913–1921

== Deans of Elphin and Ardagh ==
- John Ardill: 1933–1944
- John Beresford: 1944–1954
- James Wilson: 1954–1963
- George Bolton: 1963–1967
- Cecil Wyndham Browne: 1967–1983
- Hugh Mortimer: 1983–1991
- Stuart McGee: 1992–1999
- David Griscome: 1999–2004
- Arfon Williams: 2004–present
