= Richard Murray (priest) =

Irish Anglican priest

Richard Murray (1 July 1779 - 26 July 1854) was an Anglican priest, most notably Dean of Ardagh from 1829 until his death.

He was born in County Tyrone and educated at Trinity College, Dublin.
