= Tullabracky =

Civil parish and townland in County Limerick, Ireland

Coordinates: 52°17′44″N 8°20′33″W

Tullabracky (Irish: Tulach Bhraice) is a civil parish and townland in County Limerick, Ireland.
