= List of townlands of County Sligo =

This is a sortable table of the approximately 1,325 townlands in County Sligo, Ireland.

Duplicate names occur where there is more than one townland with the same name in the county. Names marked in bold typeface are towns and villages, and the word Town appears for those entries in the Acres column.

== Townland list ==
Townland	Acres	Barony	Civil parish	Poor law union
Abbeyhalfquarter	247	Tireragh	Kilmoremoy	Ballina
Abbeyquarter North	54	Carbury	St. Johns	Sligo
Abbeyquarter South	111	Carbury	St. Johns	Sligo
Abbeytown	350	Leyny	Ballysadare	Sligo
Abbeyville (or Ardlaherty)	105	Corran	Drumrat	Boyle
Achonry	3,157	Leyny	Achonry	Tobercurry
**Aclare**	Town	Leyny	Kilmacteige	Tobercurry
Aderavoher	34	Tireragh	Easky	Dromore West
Aghagad	417	Carbury	Drumcliff	Sligo
Aghalenane	45	Tirerrill	Tawnagh	Sligo
Aghamore Far	853	Carbury	St. Johns	Sligo
Aghamore Near	283	Carbury	St. Johns	Sligo
Aghanagh	307	Tirerrill	Aghanagh	Boyle
Agharrow	206	Carbury	Ahamlish	Sligo
Aghoo	196	Tirerrill	Kilmacallan	Sligo
Altanelvick	681	Tireragh	Dromard	Dromore West
Altans	143	Tireragh	Templeboy	Dromore West
Alternan Park	34	Tireragh	Easky	Dromore West
Altvelid	151	Tirerrill	Killerry	Sligo
Andresna	130	Tirerrill	Kilmactranny	Boyle
Annagh	71	Coolavin	Killaraght	Boyle
Annagh	188	Tirerrill	Kilmacallan	Sligo
Annagh	518	Leyny	Kilmacteige	Tobercurry
Annagh Beg	227	Leyny	Kilvarnet	Tobercurry
Annagh More	616	Leyny	Kilvarnet	Tobercurry
Annaghbeg (or Monasterredan)	119	Coolavin	Kilcolman	Boyle
Annaghcarthy	255	Tirerrill	Kilmacallan	Boyle
Annaghcor	142	Tirerrill	Kilmacallan	Sligo
Annaghgowan	218	Tirerrill	Kilmactranny	Boyle
Annaghgowla Island	34	Tirerrill	Aghanagh	Boyle
Annaghloy	143	Tirerrill	Kilmactranny	Boyle
Annaghmore	486	Coolavin	Kilfree	Boyle
Annaghmore	285	Tirerrill	Ballysadare	Tobercurry
Ardabrone	266	Tireragh	Skreen	Dromore West
Ardagh	336	Tirerrill	Kilmacallan	Sligo
Ardboline	4	Carbury	Drumcliff	Sligo
Ardconnell	203	Corran	Emlaghfad	Sligo
Ardcotten	190	Leyny	Ballysadare	Sligo
Ardcree	171	Leyny	Kilvarnet	Tobercurry
Ardcumber	161	Tirerrill	Drumcolumb	Sligo
Ardcurley	110	Tirerrill	Ballysadare	Sligo
Ardgallin	111	Coolavin	Killaraght	Boyle
Ardgivna	121	Tireragh	Templeboy	Dromore West
Ardkeeran	106	Corran	Kilshalvy	Boyle
Ardkeeran	310	Tirerrill	Kilmacallan	Sligo
Ardkill	74	Tireragh	Templeboy	Dromore West
Ardlaherty (or Abbeyville)	105	Corran	Drumrat	Boyle
Ardlee	79	Tirerrill	Drumcolumb	Sligo
Ardleebeg	81	Tirerrill	Ballysumaghan	Sligo
Ardline	259	Tirerrill	Kilmactranny	Boyle
Ardlona	127	Coolavin	Killaraght	Boyle
Ardloy	154	Tirerrill	Tawnagh	Sligo
Ardminnan	93	Corran	Kilshalvy	Boyle
Ardmoyle	260	Coolavin	Killaraght	Boyle
Ardnaglass	332	Corran	Emlaghfad	Sligo
Ardnaglass Lower	109	Carbury	Ahamlish	Sligo
Ardnaglass Upper	87	Carbury	Ahamlish	Sligo
**Ardnaree**	Town	Tireragh	Kilmoremoy	Ballina
Ardnaree (or Shanaghy)	522	Tireragh	Kilmoremoy	Ballina
Ardneeskan	105	Tirerrill	Kilmacallan	Sligo
Ardogelly	211	Tireragh	Templeboy	Dromore West
Ardraheen Beg	99	Corran	Kilshalvy	Boyle
Ardraheen More	129	Corran	Kilshalvy	Boyle
Ardrea	161	Corran	Kilmorgan	Sligo
Ardree	174	Corran	Emlaghfad	Boyle
Ardsallagh	161	Corran	Toomour	Boyle
Ardsoreen	419	Coolavin	Killaraght	Boyle
Ardtermon	145	Carbury	Drumcliff	Sligo
Ardtrasna	410	Carbury	Drumcliff	Sligo
Ardvally	242	Tireragh	Castleconor	Ballina
Ardvarney	146	Tirerrill	Kilmacallan	Sligo
Arnasbrack	507	Tirerrill	Kilross	Sligo
Attichree	228	Tireragh	Castleconor	Dromore West
Attiduff	118	Carbury	Drumcliff	Sligo
Attiville	68	Corran	Kilshalvy	Boyle
Aughnacloy	134	Tirerrill	Kilmactranny	Boyle
Aughris	515	Tireragh	Templeboy	Dromore West
Aughris	140	Corran	Cloonoghil	Tobercurry
Baghloonagh	64	Corran	Kilshalvy	Boyle
Ballaghboy	718	Tirerrill	Aghanagh	Boyle
Ballard	124	Tireragh	Dromard	Dromore West
**Ballinafad**	Town	Tirerrill	Aghanagh	Boyle
Ballinafad	124	Tirerrill	Aghanagh	Boyle
Ballincar	387	Carbury	Drumcliff	Sligo
Ballincastle	141	Carbury	Ahamlish	Sligo
Ballincurry	985	Leyny	Achonry	Tobercurry
Ballindoon	74	Tirerrill	Killadoon	Boyle
Ballineden	437	Carbury	Drumcliff	Sligo
Ballinlig	261	Tirerrill	Kilmactranny	Boyle
Ballinlig	283	Tireragh	Dromard	Dromore West
Ballinphull	233	Tirerrill	Killadoon	Boyle
Ballinphull	111	Tireragh	Dromard	Dromore West
Ballinphull	260	Tireragh	Templeboy	Dromore West
Ballinphull	77	Carbury	Ahamlish	Sligo
Ballinphull	367	Carbury	Drumcliff	Sligo
Ballinteane	270	Tireragh	Kilglass	Dromore West
Ballintemple	267	Carbury	Drumcliff	Sligo
**Ballintogher**	Town	Tirerrill	Killerry	Sligo
Ballintrofaun	57	Corran	Kilshalvy	Boyle
Ballinvally	85	Leyny	Achonry	Tobercurry
Ballinvally	234	Leyny	Killoran	Tobercurry
Ballinvally (or Roadstown)	213	Corran	Cloonoghil	Tobercurry
Ballinvally East	252	Corran	Cloonoghil	Tobercurry
Ballinvally West	66	Corran	Cloonoghil	Tobercurry
Ballinvoher	177	Carbury	Drumcliff	Sligo
Ballinvoher	198	Corran	Toomour	Sligo
Ballonaghan (or Harristown)	75	Corran	Kilshalvy	Boyle
Ballure	169	Carbury	Calry	Sligo
Ballyara (Knox)	383	Leyny	Achonry	Tobercurry
Ballyara (or Falduff)	239	Leyny	Achonry	Tobercurry
Ballybeg	135	Tireragh	Easky	Dromore West
Ballybeg	86	Carbury	Killaspugbrone	Sligo
Ballybrennan	461	Corran	Emlaghfad	Sligo
**Ballyconnell**	Town	Carbury	Drumcliff	Sligo
Ballyconnell	1,019	Carbury	Drumcliff	Sligo
Ballyculleen	258	Tirerrill	Kilmactranny	Boyle
Ballycummin	220	Tireragh	Easky	Dromore West
Ballydawley	792	Tirerrill	Kilross	Sligo
Ballydoogan	281	Carbury	St. Johns	Sligo
Ballyeeskeen	240	Tireragh	Templeboy	Dromore West
Ballyfahy	404	Corran	Kilturra	Tobercurry
Ballyfaris	125	Tireragh	Templeboy	Dromore West
Ballyfeenaun (or Tullylin)	1,498	Tireragh	Castleconor	Dromore West
Ballyfree	119	Carbury	St. Johns	Sligo
Ballygilcash	259	Tireragh	Kilmacshalgan	Dromore West
Ballygilgan	875	Carbury	Drumcliff	Sligo
Ballyglass	180	Tireragh	Kilglass	Dromore West
Ballyglass	469	Tireragh	Kilmacshalgan	Dromore West
Ballyglass	135	Carbury	Calry	Sligo
Ballyglass	473	Leyny	Achonry	Tobercurry
Ballygrania	218	Tirerrill	Kilross	Sligo
Ballygreighan	582	Tireragh	Templeboy	Dromore West
Ballygreighan Barr	523	Tireragh	Templeboy	Dromore West
Ballyhealy (or Hollybrook Demesne)	285	Tirerrill	Aghanagh	Boyle
Ballyholan	339	Tireragh	Kilmoremoy	Ballina
Ballymeeny	108	Tireragh	Easky	Dromore West
Ballymeeny, Armstrong	288	Tireragh	Easky	Dromore West
Ballymeeny, Hillas (or Carrownabinna)	175	Tireragh	Easky	Dromore West
Ballymeeny, Jones	218	Tireragh	Easky	Dromore West
Ballymoghany	816	Tireragh	Castleconor	Dromore West
Ballymoneen	253	Tireragh	Castleconor	Dromore West
**Ballymote**	Town	Corran	Emlaghfad	Sligo
Ballymote	38	Corran	Emlaghfad	Sligo
Ballymuldorry	261	Carbury	Drumcliff	Sligo
Ballymullanny	81	Tirerrill	Aghanagh	Boyle
Ballymurray	235	Leyny	Kilvarnet	Tobercurry
Ballynaboll	468	Tirerrill	Ballysadare	Sligo
Ballynabrock	64	Carbury	Ahamlish	Sligo
Ballynacarriga	66	Corran	Kilshalvy	Boyle
Ballynacarrow North	442	Leyny	Kilvarnet	Tobercurry
Ballynacarrow South	275	Leyny	Kilvarnet	Tobercurry
Ballynagalliagh	756	Carbury	Drumcliff	Sligo
Ballynaglogh	125	Corran	Cloonoghil	Tobercurry
Ballynahowna	386	Tireragh	Kilmacshalgan	Dromore West
Ballynakill	254	Tirerrill	Ballynakill	Sligo
Ballynakillew	47	Corran	Kilshalvy	Boyle
Ballynamona	357	Carbury	Calry	Sligo
Ballynaraw North	56	Corran	Cloonoghil	Tobercurry
Ballynaraw South	382	Corran	Cloonoghil	Tobercurry
Ballynary	201	Tirerrill	Kilmactranny	Boyle
Ballynashee	1,165	Tirerrill	Kilmactranny	Boyle
Ballyogan	540	Tireragh	Kilglass	Dromore West
**Ballysadare**	Town	Leyny	Ballysadare	Sligo
**Ballysadare**	Town	Tirerrill	Ballysadare	Sligo
Ballysadare	208	Tirerrill	Ballysadare	Sligo
Ballyscannel	423	Carbury	Ahamlish	Sligo
Ballysumaghan	485	Tirerrill	Ballysumaghan	Sligo
**Ballytivnan**	Town	Carbury	Calry	Sligo
Ballytivnan	203	Carbury	Calry	Sligo
Ballyweelin	276	Carbury	Drumcliff	Sligo
Banada	915	Leyny	Kilmacteige	Tobercurry
Barnacoghil	295	Tireragh	Templeboy	Dromore West
Barnaderg	464	Carbury	Drumcliff	Sligo
Barnarobin	795	Carbury	Drumcliff	Sligo
Barnasrahy	275	Carbury	Killaspugbrone	Sligo
Barnsbrack	151	Tireragh	Dromard	Dromore West
Barroe	194	Carbury	Calry	Sligo
Barroe Lower	161	Tirerrill	Killadoon	Boyle
Barroe North	140	Tirerrill	Killadoon	Boyle
Barroe South	98	Tirerrill	Killadoon	Boyle
Barroe Upper	284	Tirerrill	Killadoon	Boyle
Bartragh	398	Tireragh	Castleconor	Dromore West
Battlefield	644	Corran	Toomour	Boyle
Beanfield	63	Carbury	Kilmacowen	Sligo
Bearlough	245	Corran	Drumrat	Boyle
Bearvaish	257	Corran	Drumrat	Boyle
Behy	203	Tirerrill	Tawnagh	Sligo
Behy Beg	490	Tireragh	Kilmoremoy	Ballina
Behy More	293	Tireragh	Kilmoremoy	Ballina
Belclare	690	Leyny	Kilmacteige	Tobercurry
Bellafarney	558	Tireragh	Kilmacshalgan	Dromore West
**Bellahy**	Town	Leyny	Achonry	Tobercurry
Bellahy	196	Leyny	Achonry	Tobercurry
Bellanaboy	2,259	Tireragh	Kilmacshalgan	Dromore West
Bellanagarrigeeny (or Castlebaldwin)	64	Tirerrill	Kilmacallan	Sligo
Bellanalack	193	Corran	Kilturra	Tobercurry
Bellanascarrow East	138	Corran	Toomour	Sligo
Bellanascarrow West	149	Corran	Toomour	Sligo
Bellanascarva	112	Tirerrill	Kilmacallan	Sligo
Bellanira (or Iceford)	81	Tireragh	Castleconor	Ballina
Bellanode	106	Carbury	Calry	Sligo
Bellanurly	93	Carbury	Calry	Sligo
Bellarihid	279	Tirerrill	Ballysadare	Sligo
Bellarush	194	Tirerrill	Kilmacallan	Sligo
Bellawillinbeg	89	Carbury	Calry	Sligo
Belra	185	Leyny	Achonry	Tobercurry
Belville	439	Tireragh	Kilmacshalgan	Dromore West
Bernards Island	2	Carbury	Calry	Sligo
Billa	245	Leyny	Ballysadare	Sligo
Binganagh	104	Corran	Drumrat	Boyle
Bleachgreen	58	Leyny	Ballysadare	Sligo
Boleymount	193	Tirerrill	Killerry	Sligo
Bookaun (Browne)	84	Tireragh	Easky	Dromore West
Bookaun (Tottenhan)	79	Tireragh	Easky	Dromore West
Brackcloonagh	164	Corran	Cloonoghil	Tobercurry
Branchfield	501	Corran	Kilmorgan	Sligo
Breaghwy	1,420	Tireragh	Kilmoremoy	Ballina
Breaghwy	371	Carbury	Ahamlish	Sligo
Breeoge	424	Carbury	Kilmacowen	Sligo
Brickeen	234	Tirerrill	Kilmacallan	Sligo
Bricklieve	545	Tirerrill	Drumcolumb	Sligo
Brockagh	137	Tireragh	Skreen	Dromore West
Brougher	612	Corran	Toomour	Boyle
Bullaun	121	Tirerrill	Killadoon	Boyle
Buncrowey	183	Tireragh	Kilmacshalgan	Dromore West
Bunduff	893	Carbury	Ahamlish	Sligo
Buninna	124	Tireragh	Dromard	Dromore West
Bunnacranagh	1,329	Leyny	Achonry	Tobercurry
Bunnadober	199	Tirerrill	Aghanagh	Boyle
Bunnafedia	376	Tireragh	Dromard	Dromore West
Bunnamuck	150	Corran	Drumrat	Boyle
Bunnanilra	441	Tireragh	Castleconor	Dromore West
Bunowna	135	Tireragh	Easky	Dromore West
**Bunree**	Town	Tireragh	Kilmoremoy	Ballina
Bunree	41	Tireragh	Kilmoremoy	Ballina
Cabragh	450	Tirerrill	Shancough	Boyle
Cabragh	854	Tireragh	Kilglass	Dromore West
Cabragh	1,129	Leyny	Killoran	Tobercurry
Cabraghkeel	284	Tireragh	Kilglass	Dromore West
Calteraun	260	Coolavin	Kilfree	Boyle
Caltragh	1,969	Tireragh	Easky	Dromore West
Caltragh	151	Tireragh	Skreen	Dromore West
Caltragh	155	Carbury	St. Johns	Sligo
Camcuill	564	Tireragh	Kilmacshalgan	Dromore West
Camross	218	Corran	Emlaghfad	Sligo
Cams	376	Tirerrill	Tawnagh	Sligo
Cannaghanally	326	Tireragh	Kilmacshalgan	Dromore West
Cappagh	173	Corran	Kilmorgan	Sligo
Cappagh	556	Leyny	Killoran	Tobercurry
Carha	1,062	Leyny	Killoran	Tobercurry
Carnaweeleen	210	Corran	Toomour	Sligo
Carncash	198	Carbury	Calry	Sligo
**Carney**	Town	Carbury	Drumcliff	Sligo
Carney (Jones)	57	Carbury	Drumcliff	Sligo
Carney (O'Beirne)	76	Carbury	Drumcliff	Sligo
Carns	1,164	Tireragh	Castleconor	Dromore West
Carns	349	Carbury	St. Johns	Sligo
Carns	330	Leyny	Kilmacteige	Tobercurry
Carns (Duke)	76	Carbury	St. Johns	Sligo
Carnyarra	600	Leyny	Achonry	Tobercurry
Carranduff	361	Tireragh	Kilglass	Dromore West
Carraun	528	Tireragh	Castleconor	Dromore West
Carraun	350	Leyny	Achonry	Tobercurry
Carraun	275	Leyny	Kilmacteige	Tobercurry
Carrickard	184	Tirerrill	Kilmactranny	Boyle
Carrickbanagher	1,329	Tirerrill	Ballysadare	Sligo
Carrickcoola	268	Tirerrill	Ballynakill	Sligo
Carrickglass	118	Tirerrill	Killadoon	Boyle
Carrickhawna	275	Corran	Toomour	Boyle
Carrickhenry	290	Carbury	St. Johns	Sligo
Carricknagat	284	Leyny	Ballysadare	Sligo
Carricknagat	136	Tirerrill	Ballysumaghan	Sligo
Carricknagrip	131	Tirerrill	Kilmactranny	Boyle
Carricknahorna East	631	Tirerrill	Aghanagh	Boyle
Carricknahorna West	643	Tirerrill	Aghanagh	Boyle
Carrickoneilleen	198	Carbury	Calry	Sligo
Carrickrathmullin	154	Corran	Drumrat	Boyle
Carrigans Lower	528	Corran	Emlaghfad	Sligo
Carrigans Upper	950	Corran	Emlaghfad	Sligo
Carrigeen	24	Corran	Kilshalvy	Boyle
Carrigeenagowna	139	Leyny	Kilmacteige	Tobercurry
Carrigeenblike	231	Tirerrill	Kilmactranny	Boyle
Carrigeenboy	296	Tirerrill	Kilmactranny	Boyle
Carrigeenboy	29	Tirerrill	Kilross	Sligo
Carrigeenfadda	1	Carbury	Kilmacowen	Sligo
Carrigeengare	1	Carbury	Kilmacowen	Sligo
Carrigeenmore	264	Corran	Emlaghfad	Sligo
Carrigeens	70	Tireragh	Kilmacshalgan	Dromore West
Carrigeens	330	Carbury	Drumcliff	Sligo
Carrigeensallagh	65	Tirerrill	Ballysadare	Sligo
Carroward	530	Tireragh	Dromard	Dromore West
Carrowbleagh East	82	Tireragh	Dromard	Dromore West
Carrowbleagh West	38	Tireragh	Dromard	Dromore West
Carrowbrickeen	230	Tireragh	Skreen	Dromore West
Carrowbunnaun	242	Carbury	Killaspugbrone	Sligo
Carrowcardin	456	Tireragh	Castleconor	Dromore West
Carrowcarragh	279	Leyny	Achonry	Tobercurry
Carrowcashel	801	Tirerrill	Kilmactranny	Boyle
Carrowcashel	217	Tirerrill	Drumcolumb	Sligo
Carrowcaslan	115	Tireragh	Skreen	Dromore West
Carrowcauly (or Earlsfield)	115	Corran	Emlaghfad	Sligo
Carrowclare	109	Leyny	Achonry	Tobercurry
Carrowclooneen	194	Leyny	Killoran	Tobercurry
Carrowcoller	444	Tireragh	Kilglass	Dromore West
Carrowconor	161	Tireragh	Dromard	Dromore West
Carrowcor	71	Tireragh	Templeboy	Dromore West
Carrowcrin	165	Tirerrill	Ballysumaghan	Sligo
Carrowcrin	116	Carbury	Kilmacowen	Sligo
Carrowcrory	561	Corran	Toomour	Boyle
Carrowcushely	384	Corran	Emlaghfad	Sligo
Carrowcushlaun	442	Tireragh	Kilmoremoy	Ballina
Carrowcushlaun West	17	Tireragh	Kilmoremoy	Ballina
Carrowdough	366	Carbury	Killaspugbrone	Sligo
Carrowdurneen	190	Tireragh	Skreen	Dromore West
Carrowflatley (or Carrownaglogh)	121	Tireragh	Dromard	Dromore West
Carrowgarry	328	Tireragh	Castleconor	Dromore West
Carrowgavneen	648	Leyny	Killoran	Tobercurry
Carrowgilhooly	202	Tireragh	Skreen	Dromore West
Carrowgilpatrick	156	Tireragh	Dromard	Dromore West
Carrowgobbadagh	226	Carbury	Kilmacowen	Sligo
Carrowgun	116	Tireragh	Castleconor	Dromore West
Carrowhubbock North	251	Tireragh	Kilglass	Dromore West
Carrowhubbock South	552	Tireragh	Kilglass	Dromore West
Carrowkeel	521	Tirerrill	Aghanagh	Boyle
Carrowkeel	149	Tireragh	Dromard	Dromore West
Carrowkeel	124	Tirerrill	Ballynakill	Sligo
Carrowkeel	464	Carbury	Kilmacowen	Sligo
Carrowkeel	217	Tirerrill	Tawnagh	Sligo
Carrowkeel	231	Leyny	Achonry	Tobercurry
Carrowkeel	213	Corran	Emlaghfad	Tobercurry
Carrowloughan East	92	Tireragh	Skreen	Dromore West
Carrowloughan West	79	Tireragh	Skreen	Dromore West
Carrowloughlin	201	Corran	Cloonoghil	Tobercurry
Carrowlustia	214	Carbury	Calry	Sligo
Carrowmably	173	Tireragh	Kilmacshalgan	Dromore West
Carrowmacbryan	543	Tireragh	Easky	Dromore West
Carrowmaclenany	111	Corran	Toomour	Boyle
Carrowmacrory	91	Tireragh	Templeboy	Dromore West
Carrowmoran	115	Tireragh	Templeboy	Dromore West
Carrowmore	1,157	Tirerrill	Shancough	Boyle
Carrowmore	494	Carbury	Kilmacowen	Sligo
Carrowmore	384	Leyny	Achonry	Tobercurry
Carrowmore (or Tanrego East)	167	Tireragh	Dromard	Dromore West
Carrowmorris	151	Tireragh	Dromard	Dromore West
Carrowmurray	1,185	Leyny	Achonry	Tobercurry
Carrownabanny	808	Leyny	Killoran	Tobercurry
Carrownabinna (or Ballymeeny (Hillas))	175	Tireragh	Easky	Dromore West
Carrownaboll	271	Tireragh	Skreen	Dromore West
Carrownacarrick	460	Leyny	Killoran	Tobercurry
Carrownacleigha	177	Leyny	Killoran	Tobercurry
Carrownacreevy	160	Tireragh	Dromard	Dromore West
Carrownacreevy	106	Tireragh	Templeboy	Dromore West
Carrownacreevy	195	Corran	Toomour	Sligo
Carrownacreevy	1,614	Leyny	Achonry	Tobercurry
Carrownadargny	1,667	Tirerrill	Shancough	Boyle
Carrownagappul	132	Leyny	Kilmacteige	Tobercurry
Carrownagark	214	Tirerrill	Tawnagh	Sligo
Carrownageeragh (or Stonehall)	208	Leyny	Ballysadare	Sligo
Carrownagh	870	Tirerrill	Killerry	Sligo
Carrownagilty	763	Tirerrill	Kilmacallan	Boyle
Carrownagleragh	182	Leyny	Killoran	Tobercurry
Carrownaglogh (or Carrowflatley)	121	Tireragh	Dromard	Dromore West
Carrownaguivna East	8	Tireragh	Dromard	Dromore West
Carrownaguivna West	35	Tireragh	Dromard	Dromore West
Carrownaknockran	102	Tireragh	Skreen	Dromore West
Carrownaleck	724	Leyny	Achonry	Tobercurry
Carrownamaddoo	406	Tireragh	Skreen	Dromore West
Carrownamaddoo	479	Carbury	Ahamlish	Sligo
Carrownamaddoo	433	Carbury	St. Johns	Sligo
Carrownanty	125	Corran	Emlaghfad	Sligo
Carrownaskeagh	715	Leyny	Killoran	Tobercurry
Carrownateewaun	122	Leyny	Killoran	Tobercurry
Carrownaun	78	Coolavin	Killaraght	Boyle
Carrownaworan	249	Leyny	Achonry	Tobercurry
Carrowneden	208	Tireragh	Kilglass	Dromore West
Carrowneden	801	Leyny	Achonry	Tobercurry
Carrownleam	227	Leyny	Killoran	Tobercurry
Carrownlobaun	264	Leyny	Kilmacteige	Tobercurry
Carrownloughan	512	Leyny	Killoran	Tobercurry
Carrownree	297	Tireragh	Skreen	Dromore West
Carrownree	413	Corran	Emlaghfad	Sligo
Carrownrod	489	Tireragh	Easky	Dromore West
Carrownrush	322	Tireragh	Easky	Dromore West
Carrownrush	148	Tireragh	Kilmacshalgan	Dromore West
Carrownspurraun	475	Tirerrill	Kilmacallan	Sligo
Carrowntawa	170	Leyny	Achonry	Tobercurry
Carrowntawy	233	Leyny	Kilvarnet	Tobercurry
Carrownteane	88	Tireragh	Skreen	Dromore West
Carrowntemple	767	Coolavin	Kilfree	Boyle
Carrowntober	651	Leyny	Achonry	Tobercurry
Carrownurlar	488	Tireragh	Castleconor	Dromore West
Carrownurlar	112	Tireragh	Skreen	Dromore West
Carrownurlaur	131	Coolavin	Killaraght	Boyle
Carrownyclowan	826	Tirerrill	Shancough	Boyle
Carrowpadeen	143	Tireragh	Easky	Dromore West
Carrowreagh	415	Corran	Toomour	Boyle
Carrowreagh	289	Tireragh	Skreen	Dromore West
Carrowreagh	256	Tirerrill	Kilmacallan	Sligo
Carrowreagh	182	Corran	Cloonoghil	Tobercurry
Carrowreagh	1,308	Leyny	Kilmacteige	Tobercurry
Carrowreagh (Cooper)	954	Leyny	Achonry	Tobercurry
Carrowreagh (Knox)	623	Leyny	Achonry	Tobercurry
Carrowreilly	390	Leyny	Achonry	Tobercurry
Carrowroe	178	Carbury	St. Johns	Sligo
Carrowwilkin	481	Leyny	Achonry	Tobercurry
Cartron	215	Tirerrill	Aghanagh	Boyle
Cartron	140	Tireragh	Kilglass	Dromore West
Cartron	103	Tireragh	Templeboy	Dromore West
Cartron	105	Carbury	Calry	Sligo
Cartron (Honoria Duff)	35	Carbury	Killaspugbrone	Sligo
Cartron (Percival)	33	Corran	Emlaghfad	Tobercurry
Cartron (Phibbs)	31	Corran	Emlaghfad	Tobercurry
Cartronabree	126	Carbury	Kilmacowen	Sligo
Cartronavally	21	Tirerrill	Killadoon	Boyle
Cartronduffy	143	Tirerrill	Kilross	Sligo
Cartronhugh	327	Tirerrill	Killerry	Sligo
Cartronkillerdoo	99	Carbury	Ahamlish	Sligo
Cartronmore	529	Carbury	Drumcliff	Sligo
Cartronofarry East	15	Tireragh	Templeboy	Dromore West
Cartronofarry South	10	Tireragh	Templeboy	Dromore West
Cartronofarry West	42	Tireragh	Templeboy	Dromore West
Cartronplank	188	Carbury	Ahamlish	Sligo
Cartronroe	148	Tirerrill	Kilmacallan	Sligo
Cartronroe	133	Corran	Cloonoghil	Tobercurry
Cartrontaylor	202	Tirerrill	Killerry	Sligo
Cartrontonlena	255	Tirerrill	Kilmacallan	Sligo
Cartronwilliamoge	247	Carbury	Drumcliff	Sligo
Cashel	260	Coolavin	Killaraght	Boyle
Cashel North	266	Leyny	Achonry	Tobercurry
Cashel South	832	Leyny	Achonry	Tobercurry
Cashelboy	151	Tireragh	Templeboy	Dromore West
Cashelgarran	457	Carbury	Drumcliff	Sligo
Castlebaldwin (or Bellanagarrigeeny)	64	Tirerrill	Kilmacallan	Sligo
Castlecarragh (or Castlerock)	1,132	Leyny	Kilmacteige	Tobercurry
Castleconor	239	Tireragh	Castleconor	Ballina
Castledargan	988	Tirerrill	Kilross	Sligo
Castlegal	461	Carbury	Ahamlish	Sligo
Castlegal	562	Carbury	Drumcliff	Sligo
Castlegowan	256	Carbury	Ahamlish	Sligo
Castleloye	165	Leyny	Achonry	Tobercurry
Castleore	644	Tirerrill	Killerry	Sligo
Castlerock (or Castlecarragh)	1,132	Leyny	Kilmacteige	Tobercurry
Castletown	394	Tireragh	Easky	Dromore West
Chacefield	153	Coolavin	Kilfree	Boyle
Chaffpool	287	Leyny	Achonry	Tobercurry
Church Hill	214	Corran	Cloonoghil	Tobercurry
Church Island	41	Carbury	Calry	Sligo
Claddagh	550	Leyny	Kilmacteige	Tobercurry
Claragh Irish	321	Leyny	Kilvarnet	Tobercurry
Claragh Scotch	373	Leyny	Kilvarnet	Tobercurry
Cleaveragh Demesne	276	Carbury	St. Johns	Sligo
Cleavry	255	Tirerrill	Kilmacallan	Sligo
Cletty	294	Corran	Toomour	Sligo
Clogfin	255	Tirerrill	Kilmacallan	Sligo
Clogh	778	Carbury	Rossinver	Sligo
Cloghboley	183	Carbury	Drumcliff	Sligo
Cloghcor	89	Carbury	Drumcliff	Sligo
Clogher	1,025	Coolavin	Kilcolman	Boyle
Clogher Beg	108	Carbury	Calry	Sligo
Clogher More	292	Carbury	Calry	Sligo
Clogherrevagh	80	Carbury	Calry	Sligo
Cloghmine	233	Tirerrill	Kilmactranny	Boyle
Cloghoge Lower	374	Tirerrill	Aghanagh	Boyle
Cloghoge Upper	348	Tirerrill	Aghanagh	Boyle
Cloonacaltry	90	Corran	Drumrat	Boyle
Cloonacleigha	145	Corran	Cloonoghil	Tobercurry
Cloonacool	4,291	Leyny	Achonry	Tobercurry
Cloonacurra	471	Tirerrill	Ballysadare	Tobercurry
Cloonaderavally	129	Tireragh	Kilglass	Dromore West
Cloonagahaun	141	Corran	Cloonoghil	Tobercurry
Cloonagashel	248	Corran	Kilmorgan	Sligo
Cloonagh	171	Corran	Toomour	Boyle
Cloonagh	948	Tireragh	Dromard	Dromore West
Cloonagh	172	Tirerrill	Ballynakill	Sligo
Cloonagh	315	Carbury	Drumcliff	Sligo
Cloonagleavragh	391	Tireragh	Easky	Dromore West
Cloonagleavragh Park	25	Tireragh	Easky	Dromore West
Cloonagun	139	Corran	Emlaghfad	Sligo
Cloonahinshin	249	Corran	Cloonoghil	Tobercurry
Cloonakeemoge	151	Tireragh	Dromard	Dromore West
Cloonamahan	331	Tirerrill	Ballysadare	Sligo
Cloonamanagh	158	Corran	Emlaghfad	Sligo
Cloonamechan North	117	Corran	Cloonoghil	Tobercurry
Cloonameehan South	85	Corran	Cloonoghil	Tobercurry
Cloonanure	240	Coolavin	Kilfree	Boyle
Cloonaraher	240	Leyny	Achonry	Tobercurry
Cloonarara	262	Leyny	Achonry	Tobercurry
Cloonarather	175	Corran	Kilshalvy	Boyle
Cloonascoffagh	75	Tireragh	Kilmacshalgan	Dromore West
Cloonbaniff	371	Leyny	Achonry	Tobercurry
Cloonbannan	43	Corran	Drumrat	Boyle
Cloonbarry	443	Leyny	Kilmacteige	Tobercurry
Cloonca	363	Leyny	Kilmacteige	Tobercurry
Clooncose	361	Corran	Cloonoghil	Tobercurry
Clooncunny	153	Coolavin	Killaraght	Boyle
Clooncunny	324	Corran	Kilshalvy	Boyle
Clooncunny	166	Leyny	Achonry	Tobercurry
Cloonderry	215	Carbury	Drumcliff	Sligo
Cloondorragha	159	Corran	Cloonoghil	Tobercurry
Cloondrihara	2,168	Leyny	Achonry	Tobercurry
Clooneagh	306	Coolavin	Kilfree	Boyle
Clooneally	112	Tirerrill	Ballysumaghan	Sligo
Clooneen	301	Tireragh	Kilmacshalgan	Dromore West
Clooneen	242	Carbury	Drumcliff	Sligo
Clooneen	109	Corran	Emlaghfad	Sligo
Clooneen	240	Corran	Kilmorgan	Sligo
Clooneenhugh	70	Tirerrill	Kilmactranny	Boyle
Clooneenroe	102	Tirerrill	Kilross	Sligo
Cloonelly	123	Carbury	Drumcliff	Sligo
Cloonena	173	Corran	Kilshalvy	Boyle
Cloonerco	353	Carbury	Ahamlish	Sligo
Cloongad	153	Tirerrill	Tawnagh	Sligo
Cloongoonagh	880	Leyny	Kilmacteige	Tobercurry
Clooningan	468	Leyny	Achonry	Tobercurry
Cloonkeelaun	2,264	Tireragh	Castleconor	Dromore West
Cloonkeevy	224	Corran	Emlaghfad	Tobercurry
Cloonlaheen	346	Coolavin	Kilfree	Boyle
Cloonlaughil	1,197	Leyny	Achonry	Tobercurry
Cloonloogh	431	Coolavin	Killaraght	Boyle
Cloonloughan (or Dooyeaghny)	539	Tireragh	Castleconor	Ballina
Cloonlurg	478	Corran	Kilmorgan	Sligo
Cloonmacduff	302	Tirerrill	Ballysadare	Sligo
Cloonmull	218	Carbury	Drumcliff	Sligo
Cloonshanbally	300	Corran	Drumrat	Boyle
Cloonsillagh	631	Coolavin	Kilfree	Boyle
Cloonslaun	620	Tireragh	Kilmoremoy	Ballina
Cloontycarn	760	Coolavin	Kilfree	Boyle
Cloontyprocklis	123	Carbury	Ahamlish	Sligo
Cloonydiveen	135	Leyny	Kilmacteige	Tobercurry
Cloonymeenaghan	123	Tirerrill	Tawnagh	Sligo
Clooskirt	335	Tirerrill	Ballynakill	Sligo
Cloverhill (or Knocknashammer)	285	Carbury	Kilmacowen	Sligo
Cloyragh	314	Carbury	Ahamlish	Sligo
Cloysparra	202	Carbury	Ahamlish	Sligo
Cloystuckera	110	Tirerrill	Kilmactranny	Boyle
Cluid	448	Corran	Emlaghfad	Sligo
Coagh	291	Corran	Kilshalvy	Boyle
Colgagh	490	Carbury	Calry	Sligo
Collinsford	244	Carbury	Drumcliff	Sligo
**Collooney**	Town	Tirerrill	Ballysadare	Sligo
Collooney	257	Tirerrill	Ballysadare	Sligo
Commons	36	Carbury	St. Johns	Sligo
Coney Island (or Inishmulclohy)	388	Carbury	Killaspugbrone	Sligo
Conor's Island	111	Carbury	Ahamlish	Sligo
Cooga	1,055	Tireragh	Easky	Dromore West
Coolagraffy	331	Carbury	Rossinver	Sligo
**Coolaney**	Town	Leyny	Killoran	Tobercurry
Coolaney	349	Leyny	Killoran	Tobercurry
Coolbeg	242	Carbury	Drumcliff	Sligo
Coolbock	253	Tirerrill	Drumcolumb	Sligo
Coolboy	206	Tirerrill	Drumcolumb	Sligo
Cooldrumman Lower	240	Carbury	Drumcliff	Sligo
Cooldrumman Upper	211	Carbury	Drumcliff	Sligo
Coollemoneen	260	Tirerrill	Killadoon	Boyle
Coolmeen	172	Tirerrill	Kilmactranny	Boyle
Coolmurly	214	Tirerrill	Kilmactranny	Boyle
Coolrawer	1,055	Leyny	Achonry	Tobercurry
Coolreenill	1,321	Leyny	Kilmacteige	Tobercurry
Coolskeagh	147	Tirerrill	Drumcolumb	Sligo
Coolteen	125	Tirerrill	Ballysadare	Sligo
Cooney	217	Leyny	Ballysadare	Sligo
Cooperhill	466	Tirerrill	Kilmacallan	Sligo
Cooperhill (or Gobbadagh)	210	Tirerrill	Drumcolumb	Sligo
**Corbally**	Town	Tireragh	Castlecomer	Dromore West
Corbally	708	Tireragh	Castlecomer	Dromore West
Corcoransacres	36	Tireragh	Templeboy	Dromore West
Corhawnagh	516	Leyny	Ballysadare	Sligo
Corhober	120	Corran	Emlaghfad	Sligo
Corimla North	333	Tireragh	Kilmoremoy	Ballina
Corimla South	967	Tireragh	Kilmoremoy	Ballina
Corkagh Beg	253	Tireragh	Templeboy	Dromore West
Corkagh More	300	Tireragh	Templeboy	Dromore West
Corlisheen	179	Tirerrill	Kilmacallan	Sligo
Cornageeha	152	Carbury	St. Johns	Sligo
Cornamucklagh	135	Tirerrill	Killadoon	Boyle
Corradoo	164	Corran	Toomour	Boyle
Corradoo East	330	Tirerrill	Aghanagh	Boyle
Corradoo West	304	Tirerrill	Aghanagh	Boyle
Corray	240	Leyny	Kilmacteige	Tobercurry
Correagh	489	Tirerrill	Killerry	Sligo
Corsallagh	736	Leyny	Achonry	Tobercurry
Corskeagh	166	Tireragh	Dromard	Dromore West
Corwillick	161	Carbury	Calry	Sligo
Cottage Island	13	Carbury	St. Johns	Sligo
Cottlestown	679	Tireragh	Castleconor	Dromore West
Crawhill	118	Tirerrill	Kilmactranny	Boyle
Creaghadoo	173	Carbury	Drumcliff	Sligo
Creeghassaun	211	Leyny	Kilmacteige	Tobercurry
Creevagh	338	Tirerrill	Kilmactranny	Boyle
Creevaun	188	Leyny	Killoran	Tobercurry
Creevykeel	623	Carbury	Ahamlish	Sligo
Creevymore	598	Carbury	Ahamlish	Sligo
Cregg	433	Carbury	Drumcliff	Sligo
Creggyconnell	233	Carbury	Drumcliff	Sligo
Crockacullion	309	Leyny	Ballysadare	Sligo
**Crockets Town**	Town	Tireragh	Kilmoremoy	Ballina
Cross	98	Corran	Toomour	Boyle
Crossboy	438	Tirerrill	Killerry	Sligo
Crow Island	1	Coolavin	Kilcolman	Boyle
Crowagh (or Dunnel Mountain)	3,150	Tireragh	Kilmacshalgan	Dromore West
Cuilbeg	81	Carbury	St. Johns	Sligo
Cuilmore	1,934	Coolavin	Kilfree	Boyle
Cuilnagleragh	158	Tirerrill	Kilmactranny	Boyle
Cuilprughlish	183	Coolavin	Kilfree	Boyle
Cuilsheeghary Beg	108	Tirerrill	Aghanagh	Boyle
Cuilsheeghary More	242	Tirerrill	Aghanagh	Boyle
Cuiltydangan	252	Tirerrill	Ballynakill	Sligo
Cuiltylough	146	Tirerrill	Drumcolumb	Sligo
Culdaly	1,827	Leyny	Kilmacteige	Tobercurry
Cullagh Beg	204	Carbury	Drumcliff	Sligo
Culleenamore	122	Carbury	Killaspugbrone	Sligo
Culleenduff	107	Carbury	Killaspugbrone	Sligo
Culleens	2,505	Tireragh	Kilglass	Dromore West
Cully	869	Leyny	Achonry	Tobercurry
Cummeen	290	Carbury	Killaspugbrone	Sligo
Cunghill	225	Leyny	Achonry	Tobercurry
Cuppanagh	356	Coolavin	Killaraght	Boyle
Curraghaniron (or Halfquarter)	166	Leyny	Killoran	Tobercurry
Curraghbonaun	848	Leyny	Achonry	Tobercurry
Curraghboy	306	Leyny	Kilmacteige	Tobercurry
Curraghmore	402	Carbury	Rossinver	Sligo
Curraghnagap	117	Tireragh	Easky	Dromore West
Curry	956	Leyny	Achonry	Tobercurry
Cuskernagh	78	Tireragh	Kilmacshalgan	Dromore West
Cutteanta	36	Tireragh	Dromard	Dromore West
Daghloonagh	366	Corran	Drumrat	Boyle
Dawros	628	Leyny	Kilmacteige	Tobercurry
Deechomade	216	Corran	Cloonoghil	Tobercurry
Deenodes	292	Leyny	Killoran	Tobercurry
Deer Park Lower (or Magheraghanrush)	270	Carbury	Calry	Sligo
Deerpark	123	Corran	Kilmorgan	Sligo
Derinch Island	81	Tireragh	Dromard	Dromore West
Derk Beg	54	Tireragh	Skreen	Dromore West
Derk More	71	Tireragh	Skreen	Dromore West
Dernaskeagh	696	Corran	Toomour	Boyle
Dernish Island	103	Carbury	Ahamlish	Sligo
Derreens	842	Leyny	Achonry	Tobercurry
Derrinatallan Island	2	Coolavin	Killaraght	Boyle
Derrinoghran	765	Coolavin	Killaraght	Boyle
Derroon	158	Corran	Emlaghfad	Sligo
Derry	176	Carbury	Ahamlish	Sligo
Derry Beg	117	Tirerrill	Killadoon	Boyle
Derry More	79	Tirerrill	Killadoon	Boyle
Derrybeg	77	Coolavin	Killaraght	Boyle
Derrydarragh (or Oakfield)	344	Carbury	St. Johns	Sligo
Derrygolagh	940	Corran	Toomour	Boyle
Derrylea	189	Tirerrill	Kilmactranny	Boyle
Derrylehan	593	Carbury	Ahamlish	Sligo
Derrymore Island	33	Coolavin	Killaraght	Boyle
Derrynagraug	183	Corran	Kilshalvy	Boyle
Derrynaneane	50	Tirerrill	Kilmactranny	Boyle
Derrynaslieve	193	Tirerrill	Kilmactranny	Boyle
Derrysallagh	499	Tirerrill	Kilmactranny	Boyle
Donaghintraine	325	Tireragh	Templeboy	Dromore West
Doo Beg	65	Corran	Kilmorgan	Sligo
Doobeg	742	Corran	Kilturra	Tobercurry
Doomore	163	Corran	Kilmorgan	Sligo
Doomore	668	Leyny	Achonry	Tobercurry
Doon	936	Coolavin	Kilfree	Boyle
Doonally	178	Tirerrill	Ballysumaghan	Sligo
Doonally	204	Carbury	Calry	Sligo
Doonally	181	Carbury	Drumcliff	Sligo
Doonaltan	384	Tireragh	Templeboy	Dromore West
Doonamurray	121	Tirerrill	Kilross	Sligo
Doonanpatrick	1	Carbury	Killaspugbrone	Sligo
Doonaveeragh	196	Tirerrill	Aghanagh	Boyle
Doonbeakin	562	Tireragh	Kilmacshalgan	Dromore West
Dooncoy	176	Tireragh	Templeboy	Dromore West
Dooneen	343	Tireragh	Castleconor	Dromore West
Doonflin Lower	137	Tireragh	Skreen	Dromore West
Doonflin Upper	780	Tireragh	Skreen	Dromore West
Doonfore	656	Carbury	Drumcliff	Sligo
Doongelagh	411	Tirerrill	Kilmacallan	Boyle
Doonierin	42	Carbury	Drumcliff	Sligo
Doonmadden	226	Tireragh	Templeboy	Dromore West
Doonmeegin	286	Corran	Kilmorgan	Sligo
Doonowney	569	Carbury	Drumcliff	Sligo
Doonshaskin	190	Carbury	Ahamlish	Sligo
Doonsheheen	264	Tirerrill	Kilmacallan	Sligo
Doorly	273	Corran	Kilmorgan	Sligo
Dooycaghny (or Cloonloughan)	539	Tireragh	Castleconor	Ballina
Downhill (or Knocknalyre)	60	Tireragh	Kilmoremoy	Ballina
Dowrea	193	Tirerrill	Kilross	Sligo
Drangan (or Mountedward)	307	Carbury	Ahamlish	Sligo
Drimina	635	Leyny	Kilmacteige	Tobercurry
Drinaghan	371	Carbury	Killaspugbrone	Sligo
Drinaghan	565	Carbury	Rossinver	Sligo
Drinaghan Beg	161	Tireragh	Kilglass	Dromore West
Drinaghan More	206	Tireragh	Kilglass	Dromore West
Drinaun	121	Corran	Cloonoghil	Tobercurry
Drinaun Beg	10	Corran	Cloonoghil	Tobercurry
Dromard	346	Tireragh	Dromard	Dromore West
Dromore	181	Tirerrill	Kilmactranny	Boyle
Dromore	219	Tireragh	Kilmacshalgan	Dromore West
Dromore	388	Tirerrill	Killerry	Sligo
Drum East	155	Carbury	Drumcliff	Sligo
Drum West	168	Carbury	Drumcliff	Sligo
Drumanaraher	78	Corran	Kilshalvy	Boyle
Drumaneel	204	Corran	Drumrat	Boyle
Drumaskibbole	656	Carbury	St. Johns	Sligo
Drumbaun	1,490	Leyny	Achonry	Tobercurry
Drumbeg North	61	Tirerrill	Kilmactranny	Boyle
Drumbeg South	98	Tirerrill	Kilmactranny	Boyle
Drumbeg West	81	Tirerrill	Kilmactranny	Boyle
Drumcliff Glebe	70	Carbury	Drumcliff	Sligo
Drumcliff North	216	Carbury	Drumcliff	Sligo
Drumcliff South	421	Carbury	Drumcliff	Sligo
Drumcliff West	13	Carbury	Drumcliff	Sligo
Drumcolumb	248	Tirerrill	Drumcolumb	Sligo
Drumcondra	217	Tirerrill	Killerry	Sligo
Drumcormick	222	Corran	Kilmorgan	Sligo
Drumderry	135	Tirerrill	Kilmacallan	Sligo
Drumdiveen	101	Corran	Kilshalvy	Boyle
Drumdoney	90	Tirerrill	Aghanagh	Boyle
Drumdoney	205	Tirerrill	Kilmacallan	Boyle
Drumederalena	201	Tirerrill	Ballynakill	Sligo
Drumee	359	Tirerrill	Ballysumaghan	Sligo
Drumfad	640	Carbury	Ahamlish	Sligo
Drumfarnoght	138	Corran	Cloonoghil	Tobercurry
Drumfin	561	Corran	Kilmorgan	Sligo
Drumkilsellagh	239	Carbury	Drumcliff	Sligo
Drummacool	138	Tirerrill	Kilmacallan	Sligo
Drummartin	569	Leyny	Kilmacteige	Tobercurry
Drumnagoal	717	Tireragh	Skreen	Dromore West
Drumnagranshy	384	Corran	Toomour	Sligo
Drumnasoohy	399	Tirerrill	Kilmacallan	Sligo
Drumraine	257	Tirerrill	Kilmacallan	Sligo
Drumraine	203	Corran	Cloonoghil	Tobercurry
Drumrolla	99	Corran	Kilshalvy	Boyle
Drumshinnagh	130	Tirerrill	Kilmacallan	Sligo
Drumsoghla	121	Tirerrill	Kilmactranny	Boyle
Dunmoran	119	Tireragh	Skreen	Dromore West
Dunneill	451	Tireragh	Kilmacshalgan	Dromore West
Dunneill Mountain (or Crowagh)	3,150	Tireragh	Kilmacshalgan	Dromore West
Dunowla	3,181	Tireragh	Kilmacshalgan	Dromore West
Eagle Island	1	Coolavin	Kilfree	Boyle
Earlsfield (or Carrowcauly)	115	Corran	Emlaghfad	Sligo
**Easky**	Town	Tireragh	Easky	Dromore West
Edenbaun	319	Carbury	Calry	Sligo
Edencullentragh (or Hollyfield)	81	Carbury	Rossinver	Sligo
Edenreagh	246	Carbury	Ahamlish	Sligo
Emlagh	109	Corran	Emlaghfad	Boyle
Emlagh	85	Coolavin	Killaraght	Boyle
Emlagh	117	Corran	Kilshalvy	Boyle
Emlagh	327	Tirerrill	Kilmacallan	Sligo
Emlagh	196	Tirerrill	Tawnagh	Sligo
Emlaghfad	154	Corran	Emlaghfad	Boyle
Emlaghgissan	87	Corran	Emlaghfad	Sligo
Emlaghnaghtan	430	Corran	Emlaghfad	Tobercurry
Emlymoran	573	Tireragh	Castleconor	Dromore West
Eskragh	564	Leyny	Kilmacteige	Tobercurry
Everlaun	202	Corran	Kilturra	Tobercurry
Fairy Island	1	Carbury	Calry	Sligo
Falduff (or Ballyara)	239	Leyny	Achonry	Tobercurry
Falfin	31	Tireragh	Skreen	Dromore West
Fallathurteen	105	Tireragh	Skreen	Dromore West
Falleens	433	Coolavin	Kilcolman	Boyle
Fallougher	68	Corran	Toomour	Boyle
Falnashammer	73	Tirerrill	Ballysumaghan	Sligo
Falnasoogaun (or Ropefield)	384	Leyny	Kilvarnet	Tobercurry
Farranacardy	66	Carbury	Calry	Sligo
Farrangarode	349	Tireragh	Castleconor	Ballina
Farranimrish	150	Tireragh	Castleconor	Dromore West
Farranmacfarrell	518	Tireragh	Kilmacshalgan	Dromore West
Farranmaurice	140	Corran	Cloonoghil	Tobercurry
Farranmorgan	206	Tireragh	Kilmoremoy	Ballina
Farranyharpy	2,200	Tireragh	Skreen	Dromore West
Fartannan	593	Tireragh	Kilmacshalgan	Dromore West
Faughts	196	Carbury	Calry	Sligo
Feenaghmore	106	Corran	Toomour	Boyle
Feenaghroe	103	Corran	Toomour	Boyle
Fetherneen	154	Leyny	Kilvarnet	Tobercurry
Fiddandarry	1,929	Tireragh	Kilmacshalgan	Dromore West
Fiddaun	177	Tireragh	Castleconor	Dromore West
Fidwog	92	Tirerrill	Kilmacallan	Sligo
Finisklin	123	Corran	Drumrat	Boyle
Finisklin	218	Carbury	St. Johns	Sligo
Finlough	247	Leyny	Kilvarnet	Tobercurry
Finned	665	Tireragh	Easky	Dromore West
Finned	183	Carbury	Drumcliff	Sligo
Finnure	195	Tireragh	Skreen	Dromore West
Flat Island	4	Carbury	St. Johns	Sligo
Flowerhill	130	Corran	Cloonoghil	Tobercurry
Formoyle	1,205	Carbury	Calry	Sligo
Fortland	546	Tireragh	Easky	Dromore West
Foyoges	276	Tirerrill	Kilmactranny	Boyle
Frankford	565	Tireragh	Kilglass	Dromore West
Freeschool Land	1	Tirerrill	Kilmactranny	Boyle
Gaddan	179	Tirerrill	Ballysumaghan	Sligo
Gaddanbeg	62	Tirerrill	Ballysumaghan	Sligo
Garoke	152	Tirerrill	Shancough	Boyle
Garryduff	81	Tireragh	Templeboy	Dromore West
Gerrib Big	208	Tireragh	Skreen	Dromore West
Gerrib Little	126	Tireragh	Skreen	Dromore West
Glackbaun	228	Carbury	Calry	Sligo
Glebe	40	Tireragh	Kilmoremoy	Ballina
Glebe	34	Tireragh	Skreen	Dromore West
Glebe	33	Leyny	Kilvarnet	Tobercurry
Glen	681	Tirerrill	Kilmactranny	Boyle
Glen	474	Tirerrill	Ballynakill	Sligo
Glen	518	Leyny	Ballysadare	Sligo
Glen	13	Carbury	Killaspugbrone	Sligo
Glen Lower	129	Carbury	Drumcliff	Sligo
Glen Upper	452	Carbury	Drumcliff	Sligo
Glencarbury	443	Carbury	Drumcliff	Sligo
Gleniff	767	Carbury	Rossinver	Sligo
Glennagoolagh	233	Tirerrill	Ballysadare	Sligo
Glennawoo	2,005	Leyny	Kilmacteige	Tobercurry
Gobbadagh (or Cooperhill)	210	Tirerrill	Drumcolumb	Sligo
Gortaderry	170	Carbury	Ahamlish	Sligo
Gortakeeran	905	Leyny	Killoran	Tobercurry
Gortalough	59	Tirerrill	Aghanagh	Boyle
Gortarowey	506	Carbury	Drumcliff	Sligo
**Gorteen**	Town	Coolavin	Kilfree	Boyle
Gorteen	380	Coolavin	Kilfree	Boyle
Gorteen	249	Carbury	Rossinver	Sligo
Gortermone	593	Leyny	Kilmacteige	Tobercurry
Gortersluin	1,385	Leyny	Kilmacteige	Tobercurry
Gortlownan	180	Tirerrill	Killerry	Sligo
Gortnadrass	434	Leyny	Achonry	Tobercurry
Gortnadrung	568	Carbury	Rossinver	Sligo
Gortnagrelly	783	Carbury	Drumcliff	Sligo
Gortnahoula	463	Carbury	Rossinver	Sligo
Gortnaleck	1,182	Carbury	Ahamlish	Sligo
Gortygara	347	Coolavin	Kilfree	Boyle
Graigue	282	Carbury	Kilmacowen	Sligo
**Grange**	Town	Carbury	Ahamlish	Sligo
Grange	550	Carbury	Ahamlish	Sligo
Grange Beg	487	Tireragh	Templeboy	Dromore West
Grange East	315	Carbury	Killaspugbrone	Sligo
Grange More	365	Tireragh	Templeboy	Dromore West
Grange North	170	Carbury	Killaspugbrone	Sligo
Grange West	103	Carbury	Killaspugbrone	Sligo
Grangebeg Barr	536	Tireragh	Templeboy	Dromore West
Graniamore	83	Corran	Toomour	Sligo
Graniera	81	Corran	Toomour	Sligo
Greenan	152	Corran	Toomour	Boyle
Grellagh	418	Carbury	Ahamlish	Sligo
Greyfield	264	Coolavin	Kilfree	Boyle
Greyfield	101	Corran	Kilshalvy	Boyle
Greyfield	100	Corran	Toomour	Boyle
Grogagh	192	Carbury	Ahamlish	Sligo
Halfquarter	78	Tireragh	Skreen	Dromore West
Halfquarter	99	Leyny	Ballysadare	Sligo
Halfquarter (or Curraghaniron)	166	Leyny	Killoran	Tobercurry
Harristown (or Ballonaghan)	75	Corran	Kilshalvy	Boyle
Hazelwood Demesne	886	Carbury	Calry	Sligo
Heapstown	204	Tirerrill	Kilmacallan	Sligo
Highwood	246	Tirerrill	Kilmactranny	Boyle
Hollybrook Demesne (or Ballyhealy)	285	Tirerrill	Aghanagh	Boyle
Hollyfield (or Edencullentragh)	81	Carbury	Rossinver	Sligo
Horse Island	2	Carbury	Drumcliff	Sligo
Iceford (or Bellanira)	81	Tireragh	Castleconor	Ballina
Inch Island	13	Coolavin	Killaraght	Boyle
Inchbeg Island	15	Coolavin	Killaraght	Boyle
Inchmore	21	Coolavin	Killaraght	Boyle
Inishbeg	19	Tirerrill	Kilmactranny	Boyle
**Inishcrone**	Town	Tireragh	Kilglass	Dromore West
Inishfall	3	Tireragh	Dromard	Dromore West
Inishfree	1	Tirerrill	Killerry	Sligo
Inishmore	44	Tirerrill	Killadoon	Boyle
Inishmulclohy (or Coney Island)	388	Carbury	Killaspugbrone	Sligo
Inishmurray	209	Carbury	Ahamlish	Sligo
Inishnagor	5	Carbury	Ahamlish	Sligo
Island	14	Corran	Cloonoghil	Tobercurry
Keadews	14	Tireragh	Easky	Dromore West
Keeloges	258	Carbury	Rossinver	Sligo
Keelogyboy	704	Carbury	Calry	Sligo
Keelty	304	Carbury	Drumcliff	Sligo
Keenaghan	113	Corran	Emlaghfad	Sligo
Kilboglashy	290	Leyny	Ballysadare	Sligo
Kilbrattan	217	Corran	Emlaghfad	Tobercurry
Kilcat	249	Carbury	Ahamlish	Sligo
Kilcreevin	316	Corran	Kilmorgan	Sligo
Kilcreevin (Phibbs)	223	Corran	Kilmorgan	Sligo
Kilcummin	807	Leyny	Achonry	Tobercurry
Kildarganmore	96	Corran	Kilshalvy	Boyle
Kilfree	835	Coolavin	Kilfree	Boyle
Kilglass	308	Tireragh	Kilglass	Dromore West
Kilkere	154	Tirerrill	Kilmactranny	Boyle
Kilkilloge	486	Carbury	Ahamlish	Sligo
Killadoon	140	Tirerrill	Killadoon	Boyle
Killala	130	Tirerrill	Ballysumaghan	Sligo
Killandy	125	Corran	Cloonoghil	Tobercurry
Killanly	316	Tireragh	Castleconor	Dromore West
Killaraght	683	Coolavin	Killaraght	Boyle
Killaspugbrone	457	Carbury	Killaspugbrone	Sligo
Killavil	137	Corran	Kilshalvy	Boyle
Killeenduff	976	Tireragh	Easky	Dromore West
Killeenduff	62	Tirerrill	Kilross	Sligo
Killerry	1,974	Tirerrill	Killerry	Sligo
Killined	38	Corran	Kilshalvy	Boyle
Killoran North	305	Leyny	Killoran	Tobercurry
Killoran South	241	Leyny	Killoran	Tobercurry
Killure	111	Leyny	Kilmacteige	Tobercurry
Kilmacannon	165	Carbury	Drumcliff	Sligo
Kilmacowen	381	Carbury	Kilmacowen	Sligo
Kilmacteige	2,158	Leyny	Kilmacteige	Tobercurry
Kilmacurkan	72	Tireragh	Easky	Dromore West
Kilmacurkan	345	Tireragh	Kilmacshalgan	Dromore West
Kilmorgan	220	Corran	Kilmorgan	Sligo
Kilnaharry	100	Corran	Kilshalvy	Boyle
Kilnamanagh	388	Leyny	Ballysadare	Sligo
Kilross	208	Tirerrill	Kilross	Sligo
Kilrusheighter	204	Tireragh	Templeboy	Dromore West
Kilsallagh	118	Corran	Drumrat	Boyle
Kilsellagh	576	Carbury	Drumcliff	Sligo
Kilshalvy	510	Corran	Kilshalvy	Boyle
Kilstraghlan (or Ragwood)	294	Coolavin	Kilfree	Boyle
Kilturra	424	Corran	Kilturra	Tobercurry
Kiltycahill	677	Carbury	Calry	Sligo
Kiltycloghan	125	Tirerrill	Ballysumaghan	Sligo
Kiltycooly	196	Carbury	Drumcliff	Sligo
Kiltycreen	108	Corran	Kilshalvy	Boyle
Kiltykere	176	Carbury	Ahamlish	Sligo
Kiltylough	96	Tirerrill	Kilmacallan	Boyle
Kiltyteige	48	Corran	Drumrat	Boyle
Kilvarnet North	254	Leyny	Kilvarnet	Tobercurry
Kilvarnet South	12	Leyny	Kilvarnet	Tobercurry
Kinard	142	Tireragh	Kilglass	Dromore West
Kincuillew	831	Leyny	Kilmacteige	Tobercurry
Kingsborough	76	Tirerrill	Killadoon	Boyle
Kingsbrook	236	Tirerrill	Tawnagh	Sligo
Kingsfort	215	Corran	Toomour	Boyle
Kingsfort	103	Tirerrill	Killerry	Sligo
Kingsmountain	933	Tireragh	Templeboy	Dromore West
Kingsmountain (or Slievemore)	704	Carbury	Drumcliff	Sligo
Kinkillew	262	Tirerrill	Ballynakill	Sligo
Kinnagrelly	585	Leyny	Ballysadare	Sligo
Kintogher	386	Carbury	Drumcliff	Sligo
Knappagh Beg	116	Carbury	St. Johns	Sligo
Knappagh More	141	Carbury	St. Johns	Sligo
Knockacappul	113	Tirerrill	Killadoon	Boyle
Knockacappul	312	Tireragh	Skreen	Dromore West
Knockaculleen	227	Tireragh	Kilmacshalgan	Dromore West
Knockadalteen	245	Corran	Emlaghfad	Sligo
Knockadoo	42	Tirerrill	Tawnagh	Sligo
Knockadoo	808	Leyny	Killoran	Tobercurry
Knockagower	92	Tireragh	Castleconor	Dromore West
Knockahoney	290	Leyny	Kilmacteige	Tobercurry
Knockahurka	76	Corran	Kilshalvy	Boyle
Knockalass	39	Corran	Kilshalvy	Boyle
Knockalass	133	Corran	Kilturra	Tobercurry
Knockalough	110	Corran	Cloonoghil	Tobercurry
Knockanaher	192	Corran	Drumrat	Boyle
Knockanarrow	199	Tirerrill	Kilmacallan	Sligo
Knockanbaun	191	Tireragh	Kilmacshalgan	Dromore West
Knockanimma	143	Corran	Kilshalvy	Boyle
Knockatelly	129	Corran	Drumrat	Boyle
Knockatober	102	Tirerrill	Kilross	Sligo
Knockatotaun	273	Leyny	Killoran	Tobercurry
Knockaun	182	Tirerrill	Drumcolumb	Sligo
Knockbeg East	249	Tirerrill	Ballysadare	Sligo
Knockbeg West	449	Tirerrill	Ballysadare	Sligo
Knockbrack	274	Corran	Drumrat	Boyle
Knockbrack	293	Tireragh	Castleconor	Dromore West
Knockbrack	643	Leyny	Kilmacteige	Tobercurry
Knockbreenagher	288	Tirerrill	Drumcolumb	Sligo
Knockgrania	133	Corran	Drumrat	Boyle
Knockgrania	222	Corran	Kilturra	Tobercurry
Knocklough	97	Corran	Toomour	Boyle
Knockmore	220	Tirerrill	Kilmactranny	Boyle
Knockmoynagh	412	Corran	Kilmorgan	Sligo
Knockmuldoney	53	Leyny	Ballysadare	Sligo
Knockmullin	408	Tirerrill	Ballysadare	Sligo
Knocknacross	235	Tirerrill	Kilmacallan	Sligo
Knocknacroy	42	Corran	Toomour	Sligo
Knocknaganny	98	Carbury	St. Johns	Sligo
Knocknageeha	177	Tirerrill	Ballysumaghan	Sligo
Knocknageeha	124	Corran	Kilturra	Tobercurry
Knocknagore	91	Corran	Drumrat	Boyle
Knocknagroagh	125	Corran	Kilmorgan	Sligo
Knocknahoo	178	Coolavin	Kilfree	Boyle
Knocknahur North	137	Carbury	Kilmacowen	Sligo
Knocknahur South	152	Carbury	Kilmacowen	Sligo
Knocknakillew (or Woodhill)	311	Corran	Cloonoghil	Tobercurry
Knocknalyre (or Downhill)	60	Tireragh	Kilmoremoy	Ballina
Knocknarea North	200	Carbury	Killaspugbrone	Sligo
Knocknarea South	253	Carbury	Killaspugbrone	Sligo
Knocknashammer	228	Coolavin	Kilfree	Boyle
Knocknashammer (or Cloverhill)	285	Carbury	Kilmacowen	Sligo
Knocknashee Common	48	Leyny	Achonry	Tobercurry
Knocknaskeagh	309	Coolavin	Kilfree	Boyle
Knocknasliggaun	370	Leyny	Kilmacteige	Tobercurry
Knocknawhishage	98	Corran	Toomour	Boyle
Knockoconor	145	Corran	Toomour	Boyle
Knockrawer	81	Corran	Kilshalvy	Boyle
Knockrawer	119	Corran	Kilturra	Tobercurry
Knockroe	209	Tirerrill	Aghanagh	Boyle
Knockroe	508	Tirerrill	Kilmactranny	Boyle
Knockroe	182	Tirerrill	Kilmacallan	Sligo
Knoxspark	155	Leyny	Ballysadare	Sligo
Lackagh	240	Corran	Kilmorgan	Sligo
Lackan	421	Tireragh	Kilglass	Dromore West
Lackanatlieve	531	Tireragh	Kilglass	Dromore West
Lackancahill	109	Tireragh	Kilglass	Dromore West
Lahanacappul Island	1	Tireragh	Dromard	Dromore West
Lahanagh	196	Carbury	St. Johns	Sligo
Lahardan	233	Tirerrill	Killadoon	Boyle
Laragh	122	Tireragh	Skreen	Dromore West
Larass (or Strandhill)	388	Carbury	Killaspugbrone	Sligo
Largan	468	Leyny	Ballysadare	Sligo
Largan	798	Leyny	Kilmacteige	Tobercurry
Larkhill	402	Leyny	Ballysadare	Sligo
Laughil	2,184	Leyny	Achonry	Tobercurry
Lavagh	199	Tireragh	Dromard	Dromore West
Lavagh	245	Leyny	Achonry	Tobercurry
Lavally	1,360	Tirerrill	Ballysumaghan	Sligo
Lavally	629	Tirerrill	Killerry	Sligo
Lavally	340	Carran	Toomour	Sligo
Lavinscartron	75	Tirerrill	Kilross	Sligo
Leaffony	1,484	Tireragh	Kilglass	Dromore West
Lecarrow	382	Tirerrill	Aghanagh	Boyle
Lecarrow	377	Tireragh	Kilmacshalgan	Dromore West
Lecarrow	220	Tireragh	Skreen	Dromore West
Lecarrow	141	Tirerrill	Drumcolumb	Sligo
Lecarrow	182	Carbury	Killaspugbrone	Sligo
Lecarrow	214	Corran	Cloonoghil	Tobercurry
Lecarrow	56	Corran	Emlaghfad	Tobercurry
Lecarrownaveagh	131	Tireragh	Castleconor	Dromore West
Lecklasser	475	Carbury	Rossinver	Sligo
Leekfield	367	Tireragh	Skreen	Dromore West
Leitrim North	443	Leyny	Achonry	Tobercurry
Leitrim South	735	Leyny	Achonry	Tobercurry
Lenadoon	51	Tireragh	Easky	Dromore West
Letterbrone	1,289	Leyny	Kilmacteige	Tobercurry
Letterunshin	1,756	Tireragh	Kilmacshalgan	Dromore West
Lillybrook	66	Tirerrill	Aghanagh	Boyle
Limnagh	365	Tirerrill	Aghanagh	Boyle
Lisbaleely	267	Coolavin	Kilfree	Boyle
Lisbanagher	141	Tirerrill	Kilmacallan	Sligo
Lisconny	242	Tirerrill	Drumcolumb	Sligo
Lisconry	85	Corran	Drumrat	Boyle
Lisdoogan	226	Corran	Kilmorgan	Sligo
Lisduff	152	Leyny	Ballysadare	Sligo
Lisduff	275	Carbury	Calry	Sligo
Lisgorey	85	Carbury	Calry	Sligo
Lisgullaun	292	Coolavin	Killaraght	Boyle
Lisheenacooravan	53	Carbury	Kilmacowen	Sligo
Liskeagh	124	Corran	Kilshalvy	Boyle
Lislahelly	546	Carbury	Drumcliff	Sligo
Lislary	347	Carbury	Ahamlish	Sligo
Lislea	367	Corran	Cloonoghil	Tobercurry
Lislea	354	Leyny	Kilmacteige	Tobercurry
Lismacbryan	318	Tireragh	Dromard	Dromore West
Lismerraun	198	Coolavin	Killaraght	Boyle
Lisnagore	130	Corran	Cloonoghil	Tobercurry
Lisnalurg	180	Carbury	Drumcliff	Sligo
Lisnarawer	195	Tireragh	Dromard	Dromore West
Lisruntagh	133	Tirerrill	Ballysadare	Sligo
Lissadill	634	Carbury	Drumcliff	Sligo
Lissalough	152	Leyny	Killoran	Tobercurry
Lissananny Beg	403	Corran	Emlaghfad	Boyle
Lissananny More	195	Corran	Emlaghfad	Sligo
Lissaneagh	141	Leyny	Achonry	Tobercurry
Lissaneena	362	Tirerrill	Ballysadare	Sligo
Lissaneeny	160	Tirerrill	Ballynakill	Sligo
Lissawully	59	Carbury	Killaspugbrone	Sligo
Lissergloon	164	Tirerrill	Ballysumaghan	Sligo
Lisserlough	148	Coolavin	Killaraght	Boyle
Lissycoyne	137	Tirerrill	Kilmacallan	Sligo
Listrush	91	Corran	Drumrat	Boyle
Lomcloon	348	Coolavin	Killaraght	Boyle
Longford Demesne	201	Tireragh	Dromard	Dromore West
Loughanelteen	335	Carbury	Calry	Sligo
Loughannacrannoge	44	Tireragh	Dromard	Dromore West
Luffertan	136	Carbury	Killaspugbrone	Sligo
Lugacaha	77	Corran	Kilmorgan	Sligo
Lugatober	223	Carbury	Drumcliff	Sligo
Lugawarry	311	Leyny	Ballysadare	Sligo
Lugbaun	381	Tireragh	Dromard	Dromore West
Lugdoon	665	Tireragh	Templeboy	Dromore West
Lugnadeffa	359	Leyny	Ballysadare	Sligo
Lugnagall	241	Carbury	Drumcliff	Sligo
Lugnamackan	325	Leyny	Ballysadare	Sligo
Lugnamannow	22	Tireragh	Castleconor	Ballina
Lurgan	111	Corran	Toomour	Boyle
Lurgan	119	Tirerrill	Ballysumaghan	Sligo
Lyle	651	Carbury	Ahamlish	Sligo
Maghera	56	Corran	Emlaghfad	Sligo
**Magheraboy**	Town	Carbury	St. Johns	Sligo
Magheraboy	327	Carbury	St. Johns	Sligo
Magherabrack	358	Tireragh	Kilglass	Dromore West
Magheraghanrush (or Deer Park)	270	Carbury	Calry	Sligo
Magheragillerneeve (or Springfield)	306	Carbury	Drumcliff	Sligo
Magheralackagh	217	Tirerrill	Kilmactranny	Boyle
Magheranore	301	Leyny	Achonry	Tobercurry
Maguin's Island	13	Carbury	Killaspugbrone	Sligo
Mahanagh	869	Coolavin	Kilfree	Boyle
Markree Demesne	507	Tirerrill	Ballysadare	Sligo
Masreagh	279	Tireragh	Skreen	Dromore West
Meelick Park	58	Corran	Cloonoghil	Tobercurry
Meenagleragh	890	Leyny	Kilmacteige	Tobercurry
Meenaglogh	994	Leyny	Kilmacteige	Tobercurry
Meenamaddoo	461	Leyny	Kilmacteige	Tobercurry
Meenmore	214	Corran	Toomour	Boyle
Monasterredan	675	Coolavin	Kilcolman	Boyle
Monasterredan (or Annaghbeg)	119	Coolavin	Kilcolman	Boyle
Monereagh	287	Tireragh	Easky	Dromore West
Moneygold	471	Carbury	Ahamlish	Sligo
Moneylahan	501	Carbury	Rossinver	Sligo
Monks Island	1	Carbury	Calry	Sligo
Montiagh	1,446	Leyny	Achonry	Tobercurry
Moodoge	798	Carbury	Rossinver	Sligo
Mount Irvine	338	Coolavin	Kilfree	Boyle
Mount Temple	410	Carbury	Ahamlish	Sligo
Mount Town	384	Tirerrill	Killadoon	Boyle
Mountedward (or Drangan)	307	Carbury	Ahamlish	Sligo
Mountgaffeny	71	Tirerrill	Aghanagh	Boyle
Moydough	181	Coolavin	Kilfree	Boyle
Moygara	1,174	Coolavin	Kilfree	Boyle
Moylough	1,497	Leyny	Achonry	Tobercurry
Moymlough	409	Leyny	Killoran	Sligo
Moyrush	304	Corran	Cloonoghil	Tobercurry
Moytirra East	195	Tirerrill	Kilmactranny	Boyle
Moytirra West	334	Tirerrill	Kilmactranny	Boyle
Muck Island	21	Tirerrill	Kilmactranny	Boyle
Muckduff	168	Tireragh	Castleconor	Dromore West
Muckelty	278	Leyny	Achonry	Tobercurry
Muingwore	1,086	Tireragh	Castleconor	Dromore West
Mullaghanarry	317	Leyny	Achonry	Tobercurry
Mullaghcor	132	Corran	Toomour	Boyle
Mullaghfarna	159	Tirerrill	Aghanagh	Boyle
Mullaghfin	56	Tirerrill	Killerry	Sligo
Mullaghgar	62	Carbury	Calry	Sligo
Mullaghmore	886	Carbury	Ahamlish	Sligo
Mullaghmore	247	Tirerrill	Ballynakill	Sligo
Mullaghmore West	133	Carbury	Ahamlish	Sligo
Mullaghnabreena	140	Tirerrill	Ballysadare	Sligo
Mullaghnaneane	912	Carbury	Drumcliff	Sligo
Mullaghroe	432	Coolavin	Kilfree	Boyle
Mullanabreena	426	Leyny	Achonry	Tobercurry
Mullanashee	262	Leyny	Ballysadare	Sligo
Mullanfad	315	Carbury	Rossinver	Sligo
Mullaroe	117	Tireragh	Skreen	Dromore West
Mullaun	1,740	Leyny	Achonry	Tobercurry
Mullauns	154	Tireragh	Kilmoremoy	Ballina
Murhy	298	Corran	Toomour	Boyle
Murrillyroe	215	Tirerrill	Tawnagh	Sligo
Mweelroe	234	Coolavin	Kilfree	Boyle
Newpark	216	Corran	Kilmorgan	Sligo
Newtown	410	Tireragh	Castleconor	Dromore West
Newtown	154	Carbury	Ahamlish	Sligo
**Newtown Anderson**	Town	Carbury	Calry	Sligo
Newtowncliffony	105	Carbury	Ahamlish	Sligo
Oakfield (or Derrydarragh)	344	Carbury	St. Johns	Sligo
Ogham	244	Tirerrill	Tawnagh	Sligo
Ogham	475	Corran	Kilturra	Tobercurry
Oghambaun	412	Leyny	Achonry	Tobercurry
Oghil	204	Tireragh	Kilglass	Dromore West
Oldgrange	262	Tireragh	Easky	Dromore West
Oldrock (or Shancarrigeen)	205	Corran	Cloonoghil	Tobercurry
Oughaval	187	Leyny	Kilmacteige	Tobercurry
Oughtagorey	596	Carbury	Rossinver	Sligo
Ounagh	831	Leyny	Kilmacteige	Tobercurry
Owenbeg	1,466	Tireragh	Easky	Dromore West
Owenykeevan (or Tawnamaddoo)	844	Tireragh	Easky	Dromore West
Oyster Island	32	Carbury	Killaspugbrone	Sligo
Parke	124	Tireragh	Kilglass	Dromore West
Parkmore	103	Tirerrill	Aghanagh	Boyle
Patch	186	Tireragh	Kilmacshalgan	Dromore West
Phaleesh	191	Corran	Kilshalvy	Boyle
Portaghbradagh	177	Tireragh	Kilmacshalgan	Dromore West
Portavaud	140	Tireragh	Skreen	Dromore West
Portinch	184	Corran	Emlaghfad	Tobercurry
Powellsborough	1,041	Leyny	Achonry	Tobercurry
Primrosegrange	101	Carbury	Killaspugbrone	Sligo
Pullagh	216	Leyny	Achonry	Tobercurry
Quarryfield	629	Corran	Cloonoghil	Tobercurry
Quigabar	168	Tireragh	Kilglass	Dromore West
Quigaboy	249	Tireragh	Kilglass	Dromore West
Quignalecka	231	Tireragh	Kilmoremoy	Ballina
Quignalegan	413	Tireragh	Kilmoremoy	Ballina
Quignamanger	180	Tireragh	Kilmoremoy	Ballina
Quignashee	555	Tireragh	Kilmoremoy	Ballina
Raghly	169	Carbury	Drumcliff	Sligo
Ragwood (or Kilstraghlan)	294	Coolavin	Kilfree	Boyle
Rahaberna	252	Carbury	Drumcliff	Sligo
Rahelly	204	Carbury	Drumcliff	Sligo
Ranaghan Beg	75	Leyny	Kilvarnet	Tobercurry
Ranaghan More	174	Leyny	Kilvarnet	Tobercurry
Rannatruffaun East	199	Tirerrill	Killadoon	Boyle
Rannatruffaun West	206	Tirerrill	Killadoon	Boyle
Rathbarran	402	Leyny	Killoran	Tobercurry
Rathbaun	716	Leyny	Kilvarnet	Tobercurry
Rathbaun North	108	Corran	Kilturra	Tobercurry
Rathbaun South	85	Corran	Kilturra	Tobercurry
Rathbraghan	262	Carbury	Calry	Sligo
Rathcarrick	134	Carbury	Killaspugbrone	Sligo
Rathdonnell	145	Tireragh	Castleconor	Ballina
Rathdoony Beg	316	Corran	Emlaghfad	Sligo
Rathdoony More	496	Corran	Emlaghfad	Sligo
Rathedmond	191	Carbury	St. Johns	Sligo
Rathfrask	201	Carbury	Ahamlish	Sligo
Rathgeean	267	Tirerrill	Killerry	Sligo
Rathglass	336	Tireragh	Castleconor	Dromore West
Rathglass	227	Tireragh	Templeboy	Dromore West
Rathgoonaun	1,529	Tireragh	Kilmacshalgan	Dromore West
Rathgran	309	Leyny	Kilvarnet	Tobercurry
Rathhugh	247	Carbury	Ahamlish	Sligo
Rathkip	290	Tireragh	Kilmoremoy	Ballina
Rathlee	928	Tireragh	Easky	Dromore West
Rathmactiernan	143	Leyny	Killoran	Tobercurry
Rathmadder	162	Coolavin	Kilfree	Boyle
Rathmagurry	553	Leyny	Achonry	Tobercurry
Rathmeel	123	Tireragh	Kilmoremoy	Ballina
Rathmeel	82	Tireragh	Easky	Dromore West
Rathmoney	150	Tirerrill	Killerry	Sligo
Rathmore	368	Leyny	Killoran	Tobercurry
Rathmulpatrick	224	Tirerrill	Kilmacallan	Sligo
Rathmurphy	104	Tireragh	Castleconor	Dromore West
Rathnakelliga	48	Corran	Emlaghfad	Sligo
Rathnarrow (Brett)	218	Leyny	Kilvarnet	Tobercurry
Rathnarrow (O'Hara)	283	Leyny	Kilvarnet	Tobercurry
Rathonoragh	106	Carbury	Killaspugbrone	Sligo
Rathosey	1,012	Leyny	Killoran	Tobercurry
Rathquarter	212	Carbury	Calry	Sligo
Rathrippin	124	Tirerrill	Ballysadare	Sligo
Rathscanlan	604	Leyny	Achonry	Tobercurry
Rathtermon	271	Coolavin	Killaraght	Boyle
Rathtinaun	75	Coolavin	Killaraght	Boyle
Rathurlisk	103	Tireragh	Templeboy	Dromore West
Reask	297	Coolavin	Killaraght	Boyle
Rinbaun	876	Leyny	Achonry	Tobercurry
Rinn	126	Corran	Kilshalvy	Boyle
Rinn	55	Leyny	Ballysadare	Sligo
Rinn	27	Carbury	Killaspugbrone	Sligo
Rinnarogue	180	Corran	Cloonoghil	Tobercurry
Rinroe	196	Tireragh	Castleconor	Dromore West
**Riverstown**	Town	Tirerrill	Drumcolumb	Sligo
**Riverstown**	Town	Tirerrill	Kilmacallan	Sligo
Riverstown	333	Corran	Kilshalvy	Boyle
Roadstown (or Ballinvally)	213	Corran	Cloonoghil	Tobercurry
Rockbrook	231	Tirerrill	Ballynakill	Sligo
Rockfinlough	260	Leyny	Kilvarnet	Tobercurry
**Rockley**	Town	Carbury	Drumcliff	Sligo
Rooghan	763	Tirerrill	Ballynakill	Sligo
Roosky Beg	58	Corran	Drumrat	Boyle
Roosky More	109	Corran	Drumrat	Boyle
Ropefield (or Falnasoogaun)	384	Leyny	Kilvarnet	Tobercurry
Roscrib East	187	Corran	Toomour	Sligo
Roscrib West	141	Corran	Toomour	Sligo
Rosmore	332	Tirerrill	Kilmacallan	Sligo
Ross	273	Coolavin	Killaraght	Boyle
Ross	232	Tireragh	Skreen	Dromore West
Rosses Lower	492	Carbury	Drumcliff	Sligo
**Rosses Upper**	Town	Carbury	Drumcliff	Sligo
Rosses Upper	373	Carbury	Drumcliff	Sligo
Rover	569	Tirerrill	Kilmactranny	Boyle
Rue	721	Leyny	Kilmacteige	Tobercurry
Rusheen	301	Tirerrill	Ballynakill	Sligo
Rusheen	342	Tirerrill	Drumcolumb	Sligo
Sandyhill	308	Leyny	Achonry	Tobercurry
Scardan Beg	150	Carbury	Killaspugbrone	Sligo
Scardan More	200	Carbury	Killaspugbrone	Sligo
Scurmore	330	Tireragh	Castleconor	Dromore West
Seafield	218	Carbury	Kilmacowen	Sligo
Seefin	195	Coolavin	Kilfree	Boyle
Seevness	711	Leyny	Killoran	Tobercurry
Sessuecommon	1,315	Leyny	Achonry	Tobercurry
Sessuegarry	2,531	Leyny	Achonry	Tobercurry
Sessuegilroy	1,424	Leyny	Achonry	Tobercurry
Shanaghy (or Ardnaree)	522	Tireragh	Kilmoremoy	Ballina
Shancarrigeen (or Oldrock)	205	Corran	Cloonoghil	Tobercurry
Shancough	146	Tirerrill	Shancough	Boyle
Shancough	237	Leyny	Killoran	Tobercurry
Shancrock	778	Carbury	Rossinver	Sligo
Shannon Eighter	174	Carbury	Calry	Sligo
Shannon Oughter	184	Carbury	Calry	Sligo
Shannonspark East	34	Tireragh	Easky	Dromore West
Shannonspark West	10	Tireragh	Easky	Dromore West
Sheeanmore	169	Tireragh	Skreen	Dromore West
Sheerevagh	140	Tirerrill	Kilmacallan	Sligo
Siberia (or Slieveroe)	147	Carbury	Killaspugbrone	Sligo
Silverhill	149	Carbury	Ahamlish	Sligo
Skibbolecorragh	44	Tireragh	Skreen	Dromore West
Skreen Beg	96	Tireragh	Skreen	Dromore West
Skreen More	106	Tireragh	Skreen	Dromore West
Slievemore (or Kingsmountain)	704	Carbury	Drumcliff	Sligo
Slieveroe (or Siberia)	147	Carbury	Killaspugbrone	Sligo
**Sligo**	Town	Carbury	Calry	Sligo
**Sligo**	Town	Carbury	St. Johns	Sligo
Slishwood	374	Tirerrill	Killerry	Sligo
Slishwood Islands	1	Tirerrill	Killerry	Sligo
Sniggeen	54	Corran	Drumrat	Boyle
Soodry	268	Tireragh	Skreen	Dromore West
Sooey	151	Tirerrill	Ballynakill	Sligo
Spotfield	318	Tirerrill	Ballysadare	Sligo
Spring Garden	361	Tireragh	Dromard	Dromore West
Springfield	55	Tirerrill	Tawnagh	Sligo
Springfield (or Magheragillerneeve)	306	Carbury	Drumcliff	Sligo
Spurtown (Duke)	132	Corran	Kilshalvy	Tobercurry
Spurtown Lower	260	Corran	Kilshalvy	Boyle
Sragh	264	Coolavin	Kilfree	Boyle
Sraheens	73	Tireragh	Easky	Dromore West
Sralea	60	Corran	Drumrat	Boyle
Srananagh	301	Tirerrill	Ballysumaghan	Sligo
Srarevagh	74	Carbury	Ahamlish	Sligo
Sroove	1,670	Coolavin	Kilcolman	Boyle
Stonehall (or Carrownageeragh)	208	Leyny	Ballysadare	Sligo
Stonepark	213	Coolavin	Killaraght	Boyle
Stoneparks	85	Corran	Emlaghfad	Sligo
Straduff	746	Tirerrill	Kilmactranny	Boyle
Strandhill (or Larass)	388	Carbury	Killaspugbrone	Sligo
Streamstown	369	Leyny	Ballysadare	Sligo
Streamstown	200	Leyny	Achonry	Tobercurry
Streedagh	490	Carbury	Ahamlish	Sligo
Tanrego East (or Carrowmore)	167	Tireragh	Dromard	Dromore West
Tanrego West	297	Tireragh	Dromard	Dromore West
Tap	605	Tirerrill	Shancough	Boyle
Tawnadremira	1,060	Tireragh	Kilmacshalgan	Dromore West
Tawnagh	146	Corran	Kilshalvy	Boyle
Tawnagh	441	Tirerrill	Tawnagh	Sligo
Tawnaghmore	185	Corran	Kilshalvy	Boyle
Tawnalaghta	1,109	Tireragh	Kilglass	Dromore West
Tawnalion	134	Corran	Drumrat	Boyle
Tawnamaddoo (or Owenykeevan)	844	Tireragh	Easky	Dromore West
Tawnamore	1,722	Tireragh	Kilmacshalgan	Dromore West
Tawnaneilleen	646	Leyny	Kilmacteige	Tobercurry
Tawnatrohaun	1,417	Tireragh	Skreen	Dromore West
Tawnatruffaun	971	Tireragh	Kilmacshalgan	Dromore West
Tawnavoultry	128	Leyny	Achonry	Tobercurry
Tawnymucklagh	626	Coolavin	Kilcolman	Boyle
Tawran	684	Coolavin	Killaraght	Boyle
Teesan	159	Carbury	Drumcliff	Sligo
Templehouse Demesne	568	Leyny	Kilvarnet	Tobercurry
Templenabree	55	Carbury	Kilmacowen	Sligo
Templevanny	177	Corran	Toomour	Boyle
Tieveboy	159	Corran	Emlaghfad	Boyle
Tiraree	89	Corran	Kilmorgan	Sligo
Tiratick	134	Tirerrill	Killerry	Sligo
Toberanania	295	Tirerrill	Killerry	Sligo
Toberawnaun	173	Tireragh	Skreen	Dromore West
Toberbride	138	Tirerrill	Ballysadare	Sligo
**Tobercurry**	Town	Leyny	Achonry	Tobercurry
Tobercurry	736	Leyny	Achonry	Tobercurry
Tobernaglashy	83	Tirerrill	Kilmacallan	Sligo
Tobernaveen	58	Carbury	Kilmacowen	Sligo
Toberpatrick	183	Tireragh	Skreen	Dromore West
Toberroddy	233	Leyny	Kilmacteige	Tobercurry
**Toberscanavan**	Town	Tirerrill	Ballysadare	Sligo
Toberscardan	358	Leyny	Achonry	Tobercurry
Tobertelly	714	Leyny	Achonry	Tobercurry
Tonafortes	86	Carbury	St. Johns	Sligo
Tonaphubble	111	Carbury	St. Johns	Sligo
Tonaponra	106	Corran	Toomour	Boyle
Toomour	508	Corran	Toomour	Boyle
Toorard	65	Tireragh	Dromard	Dromore West
Toorboy	109	Tireragh	Kilmacshalgan	Dromore West
Toorlestraun	256	Leyny	Kilmacteige	Tobercurry
Tormore	659	Carbury	Drumcliff	Sligo
Trasgarve	426	Tireragh	Kilmacshalgan	Dromore West
Treanmacmurtagh	585	Tirerrill	Drumcolumb	Boyle
Treanmore	129	Tirerrill	Kilmactranny	Boyle
Treanmore	437	Corran	Toomour	Boyle
Treanscrabbagh	411	Tirerrill	Aghanagh	Boyle
Trotts	47	Tireragh	Kilglass	Dromore West
Tullaghaglass	1,092	Leyny	Kilmacteige	Tobercurry
Tullaghan	380	Leyny	Ballysadare	Sligo
Tullanaglug	579	Leyny	Kilmacteige	Tobercurry
Tully	98	Tirerrill	Killadoon	Boyle
Tully	456	Corran	Toomour	Boyle
Tully	271	Carbury	Calry	Sligo
Tully	208	Carbury	Drumcliff	Sligo
Tully	122	Carbury	Killaspugbrone	Sligo
Tully More	231	Tirerrill	Kilross	Sligo
Tullybeg	155	Tirerrill	Kilross	Sligo
Tullycusheen Beg	264	Leyny	Achonry	Tobercurry
Tullycusheen More	429	Leyny	Achonry	Tobercurry
Tullyhugh	412	Leyny	Achonry	Tobercurry
Tullylin (or Ballyfeenaun)	1,498	Tireragh	Castleconor	Dromore West
Tullymoy	248	Leyny	Kilmacteige	Tobercurry
Tullynagracken North	54	Carbury	St. Johns	Sligo
Tullynagracken South	209	Carbury	St. Johns	Sligo
Tullynure	743	Tirerrill	Kilmactranny	Boyle
Tullyvellia	1,890	Leyny	Achonry	Tobercurry
Tunnagh	191	Corran	Kilshalvy	Boyle
Tunnagh	387	Tirerrill	Ballynakill	Sligo
Turlaghyraun	58	Corran	Kilmorgan	Sligo
Turnalaydan	295	Tirerrill	Drumcolumb	Sligo
Ummeryroe	434	Tirerrill	Shancough	Boyle
Union	1,155	Tirerrill	Ballysadare	Sligo
Urlar	317	Carbury	Drumcliff	Sligo
Whitehill	159	Tirerrill	Aghanagh	Boyle
Whitehill	313	Tirerrill	Tawnagh	Sligo
Willowbrook	100	Carbury	Calry	Sligo
Woodfield	97	Corran	Emlaghfad	Sligo
Woodfield	138	Tirerrill	Killerry	Sligo
Woodhill (or Knocknakillew)	311	Corran	Cloonoghil	Tobercurry
Woodpark	18	Carbury	Killaspugbrone	Sligo
