= Tunnagh =

Tunnagh An tSonnach
- Townland
- Location within Ireland
- Coordinates: 54.164°N 8.355°W
- Civil parish: Ballynakill
- County: County Sligo
- Country: Ireland

Tunnagh (Irish: An tSonnach) is a small townland in County Sligo, Ireland. It is near the village of Sooey. It has an area of approximately 1.5 square kilometres (0.6 mi^{2}), and had a population of 13 people as of the 2011 census.
