= St Mary's Cathedral, Elphin =

St. Mary's Cathedral, Elphin
- St. Mary's Cathedral, Elphin
- 53°50′43″N 8°11′26″W
- Location: Achonry, Co Roscommon
- Country: Ireland
- Denomination: Church of Ireland
- Previous denomination: Roman Catholic

Administration
- Province: Province of Armagh
- Diocese: Diocese of Kilmore, Elphin and Ardagh

St Mary's Cathedral, Elphin, is a former cathedral in Ireland.

It was formerly the cathedral of the Diocese of Elphin, and then a joint cathedral in Kilmore, Elphin and Ardagh. It was founded by St. Patrick and destroyed during the Rebellion of 1641. It was rebuilt during the time of Bishop John Parker. It has lain ruined since 1957.
