= 1938 Birthday Honours =

British government recognitions

The King's Birthday Honours 1938 were appointments in many of the Commonwealth realms of King George VI to various orders and honours to reward and highlight the meritorious work of his subjects in those countries. The appointments were made to celebrate the King's official birthday and for the United Kingdom and Colonies were announced on 7 June 1938.

The recipients of honours are displayed here as they were styled before their new honour, and arranged by honour, with classes (Knight, Knight Grand Cross, etc.) and then divisions (Military, Civil, etc.) as appropriate.

== United Kingdom and Colonies ==
=== Viscount ===
- The Right Honourable John Lawrence, Baron Stonehaven, GCMG DSO JP DL. Governor-General and Commander-in-Chief, Commonwealth of Australia, 1925–30. Chairman of the Conservative and Unionist Party Organisation, 1931–1936. For political and public services.
- The Right Honourable William Douglas, Baron Weir, GCB DL. For public services.

=== Baron ===
- Vivian Hugh Smith. For political and public services.
- Sir Josiah Charles Stamp, GCB GBE FBA. For public services.

=== Privy Councillor ===
- Sir Donald Bradley Somervell, OBE KC MP. Attorney-General since 1936. Solicitor-General, 1933–36. Member of Parliament for the Crewe Division of Cheshire since 1931.

=== Baronet ===
- Sir William Alfred Churchman, VD JP DL. For political and public services in Suffolk.
- The Right Honourable Douglas Hewitt Hacking, OBE MP. Member of Parliament for Chorley since December 1918. Chairman of the Conservative and Unionist Party Organisation since 1936. For political and public services.
- Major Sir William Henry Prescott, CBE MICE JP DL. Chairman of the Metropolitan Water Board. For public services.
- Sir Eugene Joseph Squire Hargreaves Ramsden, OBE JP MP. Member of Parliament for Bradford, North Division, 1924 to 1929 and since 1931. For political and public services in Yorkshire.
- Major Samuel Strang Steel, TD JP DL. For political and public services in Scotland.
- Lieutenant-Colonel Sir (William Ernest George) Archibald Weigall, KCMG JP DL. Chairman of the Royal Empire Society.

=== Knight Bachelor ===
- Andrew Agnew, CBE. Managing Director, Shell Transport and Trading Company Ltd.
- William Girling Ball, FRCS. Surgeon and Dean of the Medical College, St Bartholomew's Hospital.
- Kenneth Ralph Barnes, Principal of the Royal Academy of Dramatic Art since 1909.
- Henry Howarth Bashford, MD BS MRCP MRCS. Chief Medical Officer, General Post Office.
- John Alfred Arnesby Brown, RA. Artist.
- Colonel Edward Geoffrey Hippisley-Cox, CBE TD DL. Secretary of the Parliamentary Agents' Society.
- Alderman Arthur John Edward Craig, JP. For political and public services in Peterborough.
- Arthur Edwin Cutforth, CBE FCA. Member of the Council of the Institute of Chartered Accountants. For services to Agriculture.
- Ronald Conway Davison, a member of the Central Council of the National Labour Organisation. For political and public services.
- Francis Netherwood Dixon, CB. Secretary, Exchequer and Audit Department.
- Walter Newman Flower, Managing Director of Cassell & Co. Ltd.
- William John Handfield Haslett, MRCS LRCP JP. For political and public services in the Spelthorne division of Middlesex.
- Lieutenant-Colonel Claude Vivian Holbrook, CBE JP DL. For political and public services in Rugby.
- Alderman Arthur Newton Hollely, JP. For political and public services in Plymouth.
- Arthur Jackson, Managing Director of Sir John Jackson (Singapore) Ltd.
- Lieutenant-Colonel John Conway Lloyd, MC JP DL. For political and public services in Breconshire and Radnorshire.
- Stephen Philpot Low, Solicitor to the Board of Trade.
- Alexander MacIntyre, Chairman and Managing Director of the Sudan Plantations Syndicate Ltd.
- Alderman Albert Martin, JP. For political and public services in Southend-on-Sea.
- Alderman Ernest Arnold Mills. For political and public services in Lambeth.
- John Moxon, OBE. For public services in Newport, Monmouthshire.
- Allan Hume Nicholl, CBE. Chairman of the London Safety First Council and of the National Executive of the National Safety First Association.
- Sydney Hugo Nicholson, MVO FRCO. Warden of St. Nicholas College, Chislehurst. For services to church music.
- Cyril Norwood, . President of St. John's College, Oxford.
- John Rowland, CB CBE MVO. Chairman of the Welsh Board of Health.
- George Leighton Seager, CBE JP. For political and public services in South Wales.
- Alderman Albert Smith, JP. For political and public services in Lancashire.
- Charles Herbert Smith. For political and public services in Birmingham.
- Francis Edward James Smith, president of the Council of the Law Society.
- Louis William Smith, MP. Member of Parliament for the Hallam Division of Sheffield since 1928. For political and public services.
- Henry Toy, JP. For political and public services in Cornwall.
- Samuel Turner, JP. For public services in Lancashire.
- Sydney Richard Wells, MP. Member of Parliament for Bedford since 1922. For political and public services.
- Frank Henry Cafaude Wiltshire, MC. Town Clerk of Birmingham, vice-president of the Society of Town Clerks.
- James Lockwood Wood, JP. For political and public services in Bradford.

Dominions

- Harry Percy Brown, CMG MBE MIEE. Director-General of Posts & Telegraphs, Commonwealth of Australia.
- The Honourable Harold Crisp, Chief Justice, State of Tasmania.
- Albert Fuller Ellis, CMG. New Zealand Member of the British Phosphate Commission.
- Thomas Stewart Gordon. For public services in the Commonwealth of Australia.
- The Honourable James Ross Macfarlan, KC . Senior Puisne Judge of the Supreme Court, State of Victoria.
- Robert Blakeway Wade, MD FRACS. President of the Medical Board, State of New South Wales.

India

- John Francis William James, Indian Civil Service, Puisne Judge of the High Court of Judicature at Patna, Bihar.
- Sajba Shankar Rangnekar, Puisne Judge of the High Court of Judicature at Bombay.
- Sarat Kumar Ghose, Puisne Judge of the High Court of Judicature at Fort William in Bengal.
- Rai Bahadur Jai Lai, lately Puisne Judge of the High Court of Judicature at Lahore, Punjab.
- William Alexander Cosgrave, CIE, Indian Civil Service, lately Chief Commissioner of the Andaman and Nicobar Islands.
- Hugh Byard Clayton, CIE, Indian Civil Service (retired), Chairman of the Public Services Commission for the Provinces of Bombay & Sind, Bombay.
- Major-General Arthur Mordaunt Mills, CB DSO. Military Adviser-in-Chief, Indian States Forces.
- Benegal Narsinga Rau, CIE, Indian Civil Service, Officer on special duty, Reforms Office, Government of India.
- John Frederick Hall, CSI CIE OBE, Indian Civil Service, Member, Board of Revenue, Madras.
- Hugh Bomford, Indian Civil Service, Member, Board of Revenue, United Provinces, and lately Acting Governor of the Central Provinces & Berar.
- John Rutherford Dain, CIE, Indian Civil Service, Revenue Commissioner, Orissa.
- Khan Sahib Adamjee Hajee Dawood, Merchant, Calcutta, Bengal.
- Dewan Bahadur Harilal Nemchand Gosalia, Dewan and President, Barwani State Council, Central India.
- William Roberts, CIE. Manager, British Cotton Growing Association Farm, Khanewal, Multan District, Punjab.

Burma

- U Paw Tun, Barrister-at-Law, Minister of Home Affairs.

Colonies, Protectorates, etc.

- Llewelyn Chisholm Dalton, Colonial Legal Service, Chief Justice, Tanganyika Territory.
- Cyril Gerard Brooke Francis, Colonial Legal Service, Chief Justice, Northern Rhodesia.
- Robert Hormus Kotewall, CMG . For public services in Hong Kong.
- Hadji Mohamed Macan Markar. For public services in Ceylon.
- George Edouard Nairac, Colonial Legal Service, Chief Judge, Mauritius.

=== Order of the Bath ===
==== Knight Grand Cross of the Order of the Bath (GCB) ====
Military Division

- General Sir William Edmund Ironside, KCB CMG DSO, Colonel Commandant, Royal Artillery, Aide-de-Camp General to The King, General Officer Commanding-in-Chief, Eastern Command.
- Air Chief Marshal Sir Cyril Louis Norton Newall, KCB CMG CBE AM, Royal Air Force.

==== Knight Commander of the Order of the Bath (KCB) ====
Military Division

Royal Navy

- Vice-Admiral Sidney Julius Meyrick, CB.
- Vice-Admiral Noel Frank Laurence, CB DSO.
- Paymaster Rear-Admiral Arthur Foster Strickland, CB OBE.

Army

- Lieutenant-General Maurice Grove Taylor, CB CMG DSO, late Royal Engineers, Deputy Master-General of the Ordnance, The War Office.
- Lieutenant-General Bertie Drew Fisher, CB CMG DSO, Colonel, 17th/21st Lancers, Half-Pay.
- Lieutenant-General Charles Clement Armitage, CB CMG DSO, late Royal Artillery, Master-General of the Ordnance, Headquarters Staff, India.

Royal Air Force

- Air Marshal Philip Bennet Joubert de la Ferté, CB CMG DSO.

Civil Division

- Honorary Colonel Robert William Herbert Watkin Williams-Wynn, CB DSO TD, President, Territorial Army Association of the County of Denbigh.
- Air Vice-Marshal Charles Alexander Holcombe Longcroft, CB CMG DSO AFC, Royal Air Force (Ret'd), President of the Aerodrome Board.
- Leonard Browett, CB CBE, Permanent Secretary, Ministry of Transport.
- Sir William Barrowclough Brown, KCMG CB CBE, Permanent Secretary, Board of Trade.
- Sir Cyril William Hurcomb, KBE CB, Chairman, Electricity Commission.
- Sir Arthur Charles Cosmo Parkinson, KCMG OBE, Permanent Under-Secretary of State for the Colonies.

==== Companion of the Order of the Bath (CB) ====
Military Division

Royal Navy

- Rear-Admiral Reginald Vesey Holt, DSO MVO.
- Rear-Admiral William Jock Whitworth, DSO.
- Rear-Admiral Bertram Chalmers Watson, DSO.
- Rear-Admiral Arthur Ninian Dowding.
- Rear-Admiral Geoffrey Schomberg Arbuthnot, DSO.
- Engineer Rear-Admiral Harold Hepworth Perring.

Army

- Major-General George Alfred Duncan Harvey, CMG (late Royal Army Medical Corps), Honorary Physician to The King, Deputy Director of Medical services, Western Command, India.
- Major-General Geoffry Francis Heremon Brooke, DSO MC (late 16th/5th Lancers), Major-General General Staff (Cavalry), Headquarters Staff, India.
- Major-General Geoffrey Taunton Raikes, DSO (late The South Wales Borderers), Half-Pay.
- Major-General William George Holmes, DSO (late The Royal Welch Fusiliers, and The East Lancashire Regiment), Commander, 42nd (East Lancashire) Division, Territorial Army.
- Major-General Pierse Joseph Mackesy, DSO (late Royal Engineers), Half-Pay.
- Major-General Desmond Francis Anderson, CMG (late The Devonshire Regiment, and The East Yorkshire Regiment (The Duke of York's Own)), Major-General in charge of Administration, Eastern Command.
- Major-General Francis Poitier Nosworthy, DSO (late Royal Engineers), Half Pay, Deputy Chief of the General Staff, Headquarters Staff, India, designate.
- Major-General The Honourable Harold Rupert Leofric George Alexander, CSI DSO MC (late Irish Guards and Extra Regimentally Employed List), Colonel, 3rd Battalion, 2nd Punjab Regiment, Indian Army. Commander, 1st Division, Aldershot Command.
- Major-General Henry Guy Riley, Royal Army Pay Corps, Chief Paymaster at the War Office and Inspector of Army Pay Offices.
- Colonel (honorary Brigadier-General), Lewis Pugh Evans, VC CMG DSO, retired pay (late The Black Watch (Royal Highland Regiment)).
- Major-General Frederick Gwatkin, DSO MC, Indian Army, Commander, 2nd (Sialkot) Cavalry Brigade, Northern Command, India.
- Major-General George de la Poer Beresford, MC, Indian Army, Commander, 4th (Secunderabad) Cavalry Brigade, Southern Command, India.
- Major-General Nigel Maitland Wilson, DSO OBE, Indian Army, Director of Personal Services, and Pay and Pensions, Headquarters Staff, India.

Royal Air Force

- Air Vice-Marshal Hazelton Robson Nicholl, CBE.
- Air Vice-Marshal Lawrence Arthur Pattinson, DSO MC DFC.

Civil Division

- Honorary Colonel Frank Garrett, CBE TD DL, Chairman, Territorial Army Association of the County of Suffolk.
- Colonel John Balderstone Muir, DSO TD DL, Chairman, Territorial Army Association of the County of the City of Dundee.
- John Jacob Fox, OBE DSc FIC, Government Chemist.
- Herbert William Sidney Francis, OBE, Director of the Local Government Division, Ministry of Health.
- William Kenrick Gibbons, Principal Clerk, Public Bill Office, and Clerk of the Fees, House of Commons.
- David Taylor Monteath, CVO OBE, Assistant Under Secretary of State, Burma Office.
- Otto Mundy, Secretary and Commissioner, Board of Customs & Excise.
- Frederick Abraham Slee, Commissioner and Secretary, Board of Inland Revenue.
- Arthur Egerton Watson, CBE, Principal Assistant Secretary, Unemployment Assistance Board.
- Thomas Moffat Young, lately Deputy Public Trustee, Manchester.

=== Order of Merit (OM) ===
- Sir Arthur Stanley Eddington, FRS.

=== Order of the Star of India ===
==== Knight Commander (KCSI) ====
- His Highness Maharaja Shri Krishna Kumarsinhji Bhavsinhji, Maharaja of Bhavnagar, States of Western India.
- His Highness Maharaj Rana Rajendra Singh Bahadur, Maharaj Rana of Jhalawar, Rajputana.

==== Companion (CSI) ====
- Satyendra Nath Roy, CIE, Indian Civil Service, Secretary to the Government of India in the Department of Communications.
- Noel James Roughton, CIE, Indian Civil Service, Officiating Financial Commissioner, Central Provinces & Berar.
- James Douglas Hardy Bedford, Indian Service of Engineers, Chief Engineer and Secretary to the Government of the Punjab in the Public Works Department, Irrigation Branch.

=== Order of Saint Michael and Saint George ===
==== Knight Grand Cross of the Order of St Michael and St George (GCMG) ====
- The Right Honourable William George Arthur, Baron Harlech, lately Secretary of State for the Colonies.
- Sir Howard William Kennard, KCMG CVO, His Majesty's Ambassador Extraordinary & Plenipotentiary at Warsaw.

==== Knight Commander of the Order of St Michael and St George (KCMG) ====
- Dougal Orme Malcolm, president of the British South Africa Company and Member of the Executive Committee of the British Council.
- The Honourable Charles Cecil Farquharson Dundas, CMG OBE, Governor & Commander-in-Chief of the Bahamas.
- Douglas James Jardine, CMG OBE, Governor & Commander-in-Chief of Sierra Leone.
- Henry Bradshaw Popham, CMG MBE, Governor & Commander-in-Chief of the Windward Islands.
- Arthur Dickinson Blackburn, CBE, Chinese Counsellor at His Majesty's Embassy in China.
- Harry Owen Chalkley, CMG CBE, Commercial Counsellor at His Majesty's Embassy at Washington.
- Charles Michael Palairet, CMG, until recently His Majesty's Envoy Extraordinary & Minister Plenipotentiary at Vienna.
- Herbert Phillips, CMG OBE, His Majesty's Consul-General at Shanghai.

Additional Knight Commander

- Admiral Alan Geoffrey Hotham, CB CMG (Ret'd), Gentleman Usher of the Blue Rod of the Most Distinguished Order of Saint Michael and Saint George.

Honorary Knight Commander

- His Highness Sultan Hisamund Din Alam Shah, Sultan of Selangor, Federated Malay States.

==== Companion of the Order of St Michael and St George (CMG) ====
- Charles Fenwick Crosby, President, Board of Directors of the Young Men's Christian Association, State of Victoria.
- Richard Oliver Gross, a prominent sculptor in the Dominion of New Zealand.
- Rear-Admiral Guy Waterhouse Hallifax (Ret'd), lately Secretary to the Governor General of the Union of South Africa.
- Roy Hendy, Town Clerk of the City of Sydney, State of New South Wales.
- William Richard Howley, KC, Registrar of the Supreme Court, and formerly a Member of the Commission of Government, Newfoundland.
- Professor Arnold Edwin Victor Richardson,, Deputy Chief Executive Officer, Council for Scientific & Industrial Research, Commonwealth of Australia.
- John Wood, MICE, Under-Secretary and Engineer-in-Chief, Public Works Department, Dominion of New Zealand.
- John Clague, CIE, Adviser to the Secretary of State for Burma.
- Arthur Henry Cox, Colonial Administrative Service, Provincial Commissioner, Uganda Protectorate.
- Arthur James Dawe, OBE, Assistant Secretary, Colonial Office.
- Colonel George Wykeham Heron, CBE DSO, Colonial Medical Service, Director of Medical Services, Palestine.
- Arthur Harris Hodges, Treasurer, Jamaica.
- Gwilym Arthur Jones, Commissioner of Agriculture, Imperial College of Tropical Agriculture, Trinidad.
- Frederick Joseph Morten, Colonial Administrative Service, Director of Education, Straits Settlements, and Adviser on Education, Malay States.
- Walter Evelyn Pepys, Colonial Administrative Service, General Adviser, Johore, Malay States.
- George Ritchie Sandford, OBE, Colonial Administrative Service, Financial Secretary, Tanganyika Territory.
- John Wyatt Spiller, MICE, Chief Engineer, Designs Branch, Crown Agents for the Colonies.
- Ralph Marcus Meaburn Worsley, MC, Colonial Administrative Service, Officer of Class I, Ceylon Civil Service.
- John Bailey, His Majesty's Consul General at Bangkok.
- Eric Grant Cable, His Majesty's Consul at Copenhagen.
- Anthony Hastings George, Commercial Secretary at His Majesty's Embassy in China.
- Edmund Leo Hall-Patch, Financial Adviser to His Majesty's Embassy at Tokyo and His Majesty's Embassy in China.
- Major (local Lieutenant-Colonel) William Alexander Lovat-Fraser, OBE, Military Attaché to His Majesty's Embassy in China.
- Eugen Millington-Drake, His Majesty's Envoy Extraordinary & Minister Plenipotentiary at Montevideo.
- Humphrey Ingelram Prideaux-Brune, OBE, one of His Majesty's Consuls in China.
- Ralph Clarmont Skrine Stevenson, an Acting Counsellor in the Foreign Office.
- Miralai David Johnston Wallace Bey, until recently Deputy Director-General of the Frontiers Administration, Cairo.

=== Order of the Indian Empire ===
==== Knight Commander (KCIE) ====
- Lieutenant-Colonel Arthur Edward Broadbent Parsons, CBE DSO, Indian Political Service, Agent to the Governor-General, Resident & Chief Commissioner, Baluchistan.
- John Carson Nixon, CSI CIE, Indian Civil Service, Secretary to the Government of India in the Finance Department.
- Cecil Fabian Brackenbury, CSI, Indian Civil Service, Chief Secretary to the Government of Madras.
- Major-General William Louis Oberkirch Twiss, CB CBE MC, Indian Army, General Officer Commanding, Army in Burma.

==== Companion (CIE) ====
- Lieutenant-Colonel Denholme de Montalte Stuart Fraser, Indian Political Service, Officiating Resident for Central India.
- Mead Slade, Indian Civil Service, Officiating Secretary to the Government of India in the Commerce Department.
- Eric Thomas Coates, Indian Civil Service, Joint Secretary to the Government of India in the Finance Department.
- Arthur de Coetlogan Williams, Indian Civil Service, Joint Secretary to the Government of India in the Legislative Department and Secretary to the Governor General's Executive Council.
- Colonel (Temporary Brigadier) Gerald Edward Collins, MC, Indian Army, lately Director of Remounts, Army Headquarters.
- Joseph Ernest Parkinson, Indian Educational Service, Educational Commissioner with the Government of India.
- William Cuthbert Dible, Indian Civil Service, Commissioner, United Provinces.
- Edmund Richard John Ratcliffe Cousins, Indian Civil Service, Commissioner of the Patna Division, Bihar.
- Lieutenant-Colonel Henry William Cumine Robson, OBE, Indian political Service, Resident for the Eastern States.
- Hugh Otway de Gale, Indian Police, Inspector-General of Police, North-West Frontier Province.
- Harold Samuel Eaton Stevens, Indian Civil Service, Secretary to the Government of Bengal in the Agriculture & Industries Department, Bengal.
- Charles Beaupre Bell Clee, Indian Civil Service, Secretary to the Government of Sind in the Finance Department.
- Rabindra Nath Banerjee, Indian Civil Service, Secretary to the Governor of the Central Provinces & Berar.
- Jaigopal Bhandari, Indian Audit & Accounts Service, lately Accountant General, Punjab.
- Tirunelveli Sellamier Sankara Aiyar, Indian Audit & Accounts Service, Director of Finance to the Government of India in the Railway Department (Railway Board).
- Colonel Stanley van Buren Laing, DSO MC, Indian Army, Commandant, Army School of Physical Training and Inspector of Physical Training, India.
- Lieutenant-Colonel Nilkanth Shriram Jatar, DSO MRCS, Indian Medical Service, Inspector-General of Prisons, Central Provinces & Berar.
- Thomas Alec Whitehead, Indian Forest Service, Chief Conservator of Forests, Madras.
- William Grieve, Indian Educational Service, Director of Public Instruction, Bombay.
- Brevet Lieutenant-Colonel Hugh Huntingdon Stable, Central India Horse, lately Military Secretary to the Viceroy.
- Herbert William Waite, Indian Police, Deputy Inspector-General of Police, Punjab.
- Geoffrey Stephen Bozman, Indian Civil Service, Deputy Secretary to the Government of India in the Department of Education, Health & Lands.
- Lieutenant-Colonel Edward Humfrey Vere Hodge, MRCS FRCP, Indian Medical Service, Professor of Medicine, Medical College, Calcutta, and First Physician to the College Hospitals, Bengal.
- Alexander Robert MacEwen, MC, Indian Civil Service, Collector and District Magistrate, Madras.
- Thomas Henry Gilborn Stamper, MC FSL, Consulting Surveyor to the Government of Bombay.
- Frederic Edwin Grist, Secretary, Financial Department, India Office.
- Robert Ernest Montgomery, Secretary, General Department, Office of the High Commissioner for India.

=== Royal Victorian Order ===
==== Knight Commander of the Royal Victorian Order (KCVO) ====
- Colonel Arthur Claud Spencer, Baron Templemore, DSO OBE.

==== Commander of the Royal Victorian Order (CVO) ====
- Charles Reginald Byrom, OBE (dated 20 May 1938).
- Commander Jameson Boyd Adams, CBE DSO, Royal Naval Reserve (Ret'd).
- Lawrence Franklin Burgis, CMG MVO.
- Thomas Hay, MVO.
- Captain Charles Alexander Lindsay Irvine, MVO OBE.
- Frederick Robert Hoyer Millar.
- Frank Owen Salisbury, LLD RI RPS.

==== Member of the Royal Victorian Order, 4th class (MVO) ====
- Vera Elinor Whishaw, OBE (dated 26 April 1938).
- Rosalind Culhane.
- Captain Stephen Hugh Van Neck, MC.
- The Reverend Jocelyn Henry Temple Perkins, DCL.
- Eric Humphrey Savill, MC.
- Reginald Harry Short, MVO.
- Major Arthur Noel Skinner, Royal Artillery.
- Major Charles Mervyn Hunt Wingfield.

==== Member of the Royal Victorian Order, 5th class (MVO) ====
- Alexander Ritchie.

=== Order of the British Empire ===
==== Knight Grand Cross of the Order of the British Empire (GBE) ====
Civil Division

- The Right Honourable Richard William Alan, Earl of Onslow, OBE, Lord Chairman of Committees in the House of Lords since 1931. For political and public services.

==== Dame Grand Cross of the Order of the British Empire (GBE) ====
Civil Division

- Irene Frances Adza, Marchioness of Carisbrooke.

==== Knight Commander of the Order of the British Empire (KBE) ====
Civil Division

- James Alan Noel Barlow, CB CBE, Under-Secretary, Treasury.
- Frederick Carl Bovenschen, CB, Deputy Under-Secretary of State, War Office.
- Harold William Stannus Gray. For political and public services in Cambridgeshire.
- Brigadier-General Ernest Makins, CB DSO MP, Member of Parliament for Knutsford since 1922. For political and public services.
- Arthur William Street, CB CMG CIE MC, First Deputy Under Secretary of State, Air Ministry. Lately Second Secretary, Ministry of Agriculture & Fisheries.
- Cecil McAlpine Weir, MC JP, Convener of the Empire Exhibition, Scotland, and Chairman of the Administrative Committee.
- Robert Calder-Marshall, CBE, Chairman of the British Chamber of Commerce, Shanghai.
- Lewa Thomas Wentworth Russell Pasha, CMG OBE, Commandant of the Cairo City Police and Director of the Central Narcotics Intelligence Bureau, Cairo.
- Alfred Charles Davidson, General Manager, Bank of New South Wales. For public services in the Commonwealth of Australia.
- Professor Thomas Easterfield, PhD FIC, formerly director of the Cawthron Institute of Scientific Research, Nelson, Dominion of New Zealand.
- Sir Samuel Hordern, President of the Royal Agricultural Society, State of New South Wales.

==== Dame Commander of the Order of the British Empire (DBE) ====
Civil Division

- Katherine Elizabeth, Countess of Elgin & Kincardine, MBE, Chairman of the Women's Section, Empire Exhibition, Scotland.

==== Commander of the Order of the British Empire (CBE) ====
Military Division

Royal Navy

- Colonel Second Commandant John Melville Tuke, OBE, Royal Marines.
- Captain Douglas Davenport-Jones, RD ADC, Royal Naval Reserve.

Army

- Colonel (temporary Brigadier) Walter Headfort Brooke, MC, Territorial Army, Commander, 130th (Devon & Cornwall) Infantry Brigade.
- Colonel (temporary Brigadier) Norman Robertson Campbell, MC TD, Territorial Army, Commander, 157th (Highland Light Infantry) Infantry Brigade.
- Lieutenant-Colonel and Brevet Colonel Norman Douglas, TD, Royal Army Ordnance Corps, Territorial Army, Deputy Assistant Director of Ordnance Services, 50th (Northumbrian) Division, Territorial Army.
- Major (local Colonel) Charles Christopher Fowkes, MC, The South Wales Borderers, Commander, Southern Brigade, The King's African Rifles.
- Colonel (temporary Brigadier) Godfrey Morgan Giles, MC TD, Territorial Army, Commander, 2nd (London) Infantry Brigade, Territorial Army.
- Colonel Lionel Denham Henderson, MC TD, Territorial Army, late Officer Commanding The London Scottish, The Gordon Highlanders, Territorial Army.
- Colonel (temporary Brigadier) Lennard Charles Mandleberg, DSO MC TD, Territorial Army, Commander, 164th (North Lancashire) Infantry Brigade, Territorial Army.
- Daisy Maud Martin, RRC, Retired pay, late Matron-in-Chief, Queen Alexandra's Imperial Military Nursing Service.
- Colonel Robert Cecil Milliken, TD MIEE, Territorial Army, Honorary Colonel, 29th (Kent) Anti-Aircraft Battalion, Royal Engineers, Territorial Army.
- Colonel Philip Henry Mitchiner, TD FRCS, Territorial Army, Honorary Surgeon to The King, Assistant Director of Medical Services, 1st Anti-Aircraft Division, Territorial Army.
- Colonel (temporary Brigadier) Arthur Leslie Walter Newth, DSO MC TD, Territorial Army, Commander, 144th (Gloucestershire & Worcestershire) Infantry Brigade, Territorial Army.
- Lieutenant-Colonel and Brevet Colonel Roderick George Fenwick-Palmer, Retired, late Officer Commanding, 4th (Denbighshire) Battalion, The Royal Welch Fusiliers, Territorial Army (Major, Regular Army Reserve of Officers, The Life Guards.)
- Colonel Robert Brindley Pitt, MC TD BA AMInstCE AMIMechE, Territorial Army, Honorary Colonel, 43rd (Wessex) Divisional Engineers, Territorial Army.
- Colonel Frederick Dudley Samuel, DSO TD, late Territorial Army Reserve, late Honorary Colonel 10th (3rd City of London) Battalion, The Royal Fusiliers), Territorial Army.
- Colonel (temporary Brigadier) Oliver Daniel Smallwood, TD, Territorial Army, Commander, 143rd (Warwickshire) Infantry Brigade, Territorial Army.
- Lieutenant-Colonel and Brevet Colonel William Tozer, TD, Officer Commanding, The Hallamshire Battalion, The York and Lancaster Regiment, Territorial Army.

Royal Air Force

- Wing-Commander Oswin George William Gifford Lywood, OBE, Royal Air Force.

Civil Division

- John Beard, Member and Past President of the Council of Agriculture for England. Formerly President of the Workers' Union and of the Transport & General Workers' Union, President of the Trades Union Congress in 1930.
- Mary Emily Percy Birley, JP, Chief Commissioner for England, Girl Guides Association, and formerly County Commissioner for North West Lancashire.
- Harold Bishop, MIEE MIMechE, Assistant Chief Engineer, British Broadcasting Corporation.
- Isabella Edith Phillips Brocklehurst. For political and public services in Lancashire and Cheshire.
- Robert Henry Charles, HM Chief Inspector of Elementary Schools, Board of Education.
- Henry Williamson Clothier, Director of Accounts, Air Ministry.
- Major Ernest Radcliffe Cockburn, OBE, Chief Constable of Hampshire.
- Ruth Frances Darwin, Senior Commissioner, Board of Control.
- William Dunn, JP. For political and public services in North West Devon.
- James Fenton, MD MRCP DPH, Medical Officer of Health, Royal Borough of Kensington.
- Louis Fleischmann, Chairman of the Royal National Orthopaedic Hospital.
- William Gladstone Gilbert, ISO, Deputy Comptroller and Accountant General, General Post Office.
- Harry Andrew Bennie Gray, MIMechE MIChemE JP, Chairman of the Huddersfield & District Local Employment Committee and of the Juvenile Advisory Committee.
- Elizabeth Hurdon, MD, lately Director, Medical Services & Research, the Marie Curie Hospital, Hampstead, and now a member of the Advisory Council of the Hospital.
- Bennett Melvill Jones, AFC, Francis Mond Professor of Aeronautical Engineering in the University of Cambridge.
- Major Cedric Llewellyn Longstaff, TD JP DL. For political and public services.
- Major Cyril Clarke Boville Morris, MC MIMechE, lately Chief Officer, London Fire Brigade.
- Cecil Oakes, Clerk of the East Suffolk County Council.
- Lady Muriel Evelyn Vernon Paget, OBE, Founder of the British Subjects in Russia Relief Association. For welfare and charitable work in various foreign countries.
- William George Pearson, JP. Member of Parliament for Jarrow, 1931–35 For political and public services in Jarrow.
- William Percival Robinson, MICE, County Engineer & Surveyor, Surrey County Council.
- Humbert Anthony Sabelli, secretary of the Lawn Tennis Association.
- Clarence Thomas Albert Sadd, JP. For political and public services.
- Ethel Walker, Artist.
- Charles Redwood Vachell Wallace, Second Assistant Director of Public Prosecutions.
- Edmund Basil Wedmore, MIEE FInstP, Director & Secretary, British Electrical and Allied Industries Research Association.
- Robert William Wharhirst, OBE, Chief Superintendent of Armament Supply, Admiralty.
- Councillor George Williams, Chairman, National Industrial Development Council of Wales & Monmouthshire. For public services in Wales.
- James Laidlaw Maxwell, a British subject resident in Hankow, General Secretary of the International Red Cross Committee for Central China.
- William Donald Campbell Laidlaw Purves, Governor of the Northern Province, Sudan.
- Charles Aubrey Smith, a British subject resident in South California.
- Arthur Ernest Tipper, Chairman of the British Municipal Council, Tianjin.
- Edward Sheldon Wilkinson, a British subject resident in Shanghai.
- The Honourable Margaret Mary Best, OBE, Honorary Secretary of the School Empire Tours Committee.
- Captain Edward Thornton Fox, OBE, Secretary to the Treasury, Southern Rhodesia.
- George William Frederick Holland, State President, Victorian Branch of the Returned Sailors' and Soldiers' Imperial League of Australia.
- Annie Elizabeth Kelly, a prominent artist in the Dominion of New Zealand.
- Augustus Leo Kenny, MB ChB FRACS. For social welfare services in the State of Victoria.
- William Sanderson La Trobe, formerly Superintendent of Technical Education, Education Department, Dominion of New Zealand.
- Lewis Richard Macgregor, Trade Commissioner in Canada for the Commonwealth of Australia.
- Gregan McMahon. For services to the stage in the Commonwealth of Australia.
- Alderman Ernest Samuel Marks, of the City of Sydney, State of New South Wales. For public services.
- The Honourable Ernest Christian Sommerlad, MLC. For public services in the State of New South Wales.
- Khan Bahadur Ali Buksh Mohamed Hussain, Member, Council of State.
- Albert Henry Byrt, Special Correspondent and Director, Times of India, Bombay.
- Frank Samuel Grose, Burma Frontier Service (Ret'd).
- Major Eric Aldhelm Torlogh Dutton, OBE, Colonial Administrative Service, Principal Assistant Chief Secretary, Northern Rhodesia.
- Conway Harvey. For public services in Kenya.
- William Walker Henderson, MRCVS DVSM, Colonial Veterinary Service, Director of Veterinary Services, Nigeria.
- The Right Reverend Frank Melville Jones, DD, Bishop of Lagos, Nigeria. For services to education in Nigeria.
- William Stanley Reeve-Tucker. For public services in the Federated Malay States.
- Kenneth Cyprian Strahan, Chief Mechanical Engineer, Kenya & Uganda Railways & Harbours.
- Edward James Wayland, ARCS MInstMM FGS, Colonial Geological Survey Service, Director of Geological Survey, Uganda.

==== Officer of the Order of the British Empire (OBE) ====
Military Division

Royal Navy

- Commander Gerald Courtney Banister, Royal Navy.
- Commander Leonard Hammersley Bell, Royal Navy.
- Engineer Commander Leslie Wood Robinson, Royal Navy.
- Surgeon Commander Joseph Archibald Maxwell, MB BCh FRCS, Royal Navy.
- Paymaster Commander Maurice Herbert Elliott, MBE, Royal Navy.

Army

- Lieutenant-Colonel and Brevet Colonel John Sandeman Allen, MC TD MP, Territorial Army Reserve of Officers, late Officer Commanding 106th (Lancashire Yeomanry) Army Field Brigade, Royal Artillery, Territorial Army.
- Major Charles Bevan Carew Anderson, MB FRCS, Royal Army Medical Corps.
- Major Charles George William Stacpoole Heaton-Armstrong, Royal Engineers.
- Colonel William Saville Ashley, late Officer Commanding, 42nd (East Lancashire) Divisional Signals, Royal Corps of Signals, Territorial Army.
- Lieutenant-Colonel and Brevet Colonel Richard Atkinson, MC TD, Officer Commanding 74th (Northumbrian) Field Brigade, Royal Artillery, Territorial Army.
- Lieutenant-Colonel William Brooks, TD, late Officer Commanding, 54th (Durham & West Riding) Medium Brigade, Royal Artillery, Territorial Army.
- Lieutenant-Colonel and Brevet Colonel Albert Quintus Browning, TD, Officer Commanding Kent & Sussex Heavy Brigade, Royal Artillery, Territorial Army.
- Major (local Lieutenant-Colonel) George McIllree Stanton Bruce, MC, The Lincolnshire Regiment, Officer Commanding The Malay Regiment.
- Lieutenant-Colonel (Honorary Colonel) Harold James Copley, VD, Unattached List, 4th Military District, Australian Military Forces.
- Captain and Brevet Major Algernon Edward Cottam, MC, The South Staffordshire Regiment.
- Lieutenant-Colonel Arthur Foulkes Baglietto Cottrell, DSO, Royal Artillery, late Inspector, Artillery (General Staff Officer, 2nd Grade), British Military Mission, attached Iraq Army.
- Major and Brevet Lieutenant-Colonel Robert Kennedy Cullen, Royal Army Ordnance Corps, Territorial Army, Deputy Assistant Director of Ordnance Services, 52nd (Lowland) Division, Territorial Army.
- Lieutenant-Colonel and Brevet Colonel Harold Maldwyn Davies, TD, Officer Commanding, 5th (Flintshire) Battalion, The Royal Welch Fusiliers, Territorial Army.
- Lieutenant-Colonel and Brevet Colonel Samuel Percy Dawson, MM TD, late Officer Commanding, 8th (Ardwick) Battalion, The Manchester Regiment, Territorial Army.
- Lieutenant-Colonel and Brevet Colonel Newlyn Mason Elliott, DSO TD, Officer Commanding, 72nd (Hampshire) Anti-Aircraft Brigade, Royal Artillery, Territorial Army.
- Captain and Brevet Major Herbert Baird Evans, TD, Queen Mary's Grammar School Contingent, Junior Division Officers Training Corps.
- Lieutenant-Colonel and Brevet Colonel Christian Albert Hastings Fairbank, MC TD, late Officer Commanding, 66th (South Midland) Field Brigade, Royal Artillery, Territorial Army.
- Lieutenant-Colonel and Brevet Colonel John Malcolm Fisher, DSO MC TD, Officer Commanding, 67th (The York & Lancaster Regiment) Anti-Aircraft Brigade, Royal Artillery, Territorial Army.
- Lieutenant-Colonel and Brevet Colonel Aubrey Nathaniel Francis, TD, Officer Commanding 5th (Hackney) Battalion, The Royal Berkshire Regiment (Princess Charlotte of Wales's), Territorial Army.
- Major Eric Freeman Clayton-Greene, Officer Commanding Second Medium Battery, New Zealand Artillery (Territorial Force).
- Lieutenant-Colonel Ernest Lucas Guest, District Commandant, No.8 Military District, Defence Force, Southern Rhodesia.
- The Reverend Henry Hugh Longuet Longuet-Higgins, MC , Chaplain to the Forces, 3rd Class, Royal Army Chaplains' Department, Territorial Army, Senior Chaplain, 44th (Home Counties) Division, Territorial Army.
- Lieutenant-Colonel and Brevet Colonel Harold Ridley Hooper, MC TD, Officer Commanding, 4th Battalion, The Norfolk Regiment, Territorial Army.
- Colonel Phillip Kirkup, DSO MC TD, Territorial Army, late Officer Commanding 8th Battalion, The Durham Light Infantry, Territorial Army.
- Lieutenant-Colonel and Brevet Colonel Carl Arthur Boys Lindop, late Officer Commanding, 5th Battalion, The South Staffordshire Regiment, Territorial Army.
- Lieutenant-Colonel and Brevet Colonel Colin Sinclair Lyon, TD, Officer Commanding, 87th (1st West Lancashire) Field Brigade, Royal Artillery, Territorial Army.
- Major and Brevet Lieutenant-Colonel Walter Adair MacLellan, MC TD, 80th (Lowland–City of Glasgow) Field Brigade, Royal Artillery, Territorial Army.
- Colonel Charles Henry March, TD, late Officer Commanding, 82nd (Welsh) Field Brigade, Royal Artillery, Territorial Army.
- Lieutenant-Colonel Charles Daniel Martin, TD, Officer Commanding 59th (The Essex Regiment) Anti-Aircraft Brigade, Royal Artillery, Territorial Army.
- Major Edgar Julius Medley, MC, Royal Artillery, General Staff Officer, 2nd Grade, Headquarters, Malaya.
- Lieutenant-Colonel and Brevet Colonel George David Keith Murray, MC TD, Officer Commanding, 226th Anti-Aircraft Battery, Royal Artillery, Territorial Army.
- Lieutenant-Colonel Reginald Fosbery Nation, (Major, retired pay, late The Royal Fusiliers (City of London Regiment)), Officer Commanding, 9th (2nd City of London) Battalion, The Royal Fusiliers (City of London Regiment), Territorial Army.
- Lieutenant-Colonel Cyril Mainwaring Newman, MC VD, District Commandant, No.20 Military District, Defence Force, Southern Rhodesia.
- Colonel Bernard Pearfield, MC TD, Territorial Army, Honorary Colonel, 5th Battalion, The Royal Northumberland Fusiliers, Territorial Army.
- Lieutenant-Colonel and Brevet Colonel Arthur Maxwell Ramsden, MBE TD, Officer Commanding 66th (Leeds Rifles, The West Yorkshire Regiment) Anti-Aircraft Brigade, Royal Artillery, Territorial Army.
- Major and Brevet Lieutenant-Colonel Alexander Frederick Gordon Renton, MC, Officer Commanding, 25th (Northamptonshire Yeomanry) Armoured Car Company, Royal Tank Corps, Territorial Army.
- Captain (Local Major) Edmund Charles Richards, The Oxfordshire & Buckinghamshire Light Infantry, Assistant Military Attaché, Paris.
- Lieutenant-Colonel James Wilson Robertson, DCM, late Officer Commanding, 52nd (Lowland) Divisional Signals, Royal Corps of Signals, Territorial Army.
- Lieutenant-Colonel and Brevet Colonel Beltran Ford Robinson, TD, late Officer Commanding, 9th Battalion, The Manchester Regiment, Territorial Army.
- Lieutenant-Colonel and Brevet Colonel James Frederick Martyn Robinson, MC TD, late Officer Commanding, 93rd (East Lancashire) Army Field Brigade, Royal Artillery, Territorial Army.
- Lieutenant-Colonel Sydney Fairbairn Rowell, Australian Staff Corps, General Staff Officer, 1st Division, and 2nd District Base, 2nd Military District, Australian Military Forces.
- Lieutenant-Colonel Waldo Sansoni, VD, Officer Commanding, Ceylon Light Infantry.
- Lieutenant-Colonel and Brevet Colonel Henry Donald Scowcroft, TD, Officer Commanding, 65th (The Manchester Regiment) Anti-Aircraft Brigade, Royal Artillery, Territorial Army.
- Captain Adam Burne Sullivan, 16th/5th Lancers, attached 9th Queen's Royal Lancers; late Local Major, 2nd-in-Command, Somaliland Camel Corps, The King's African Rifles.
- Lieutenant-Colonel and Brevet Colonel-Alfred Leslie Symes, TD, Officer Commanding, 56th (Devon) Army Field Brigade, Royal Artillery, Territorial Army.
- Colonel Ian Kenneth Thomson, TD, late Officer Commanding, 6th (The Morayshire) Battalion, The Seaforth Highlanders (Ross-shire Buffs, The Duke of Albany's), Territorial Army.
- Lieutenant-Colonel and Brevet Colonel Ralph Gates Wever, MC TD, late Officer Commanding, 49th (West Riding) Divisional Engineers, Royal Engineers, Territorial Army.
- Major and Brevet Lieutenant-Colonel George Whittaker, TD, Officer Commanding, 8th (London) Hygiene Company, Royal Army Medical Corps, Territorial Army.
- Lieutenant-Colonel and Brevet Colonel Robert Frederick Edward Whittaker, TD, Officer Commanding 53rd (City of London) Anti-Aircraft Brigade, Royal Artillery, Territorial Army.

Royal Air Force

- Wing Commander Victor Hubert Tait, Royal Air Force.
- Wing Commander Arnold Samuel Thompson, Royal Air Force.
- Wing Commander Harry Leonard Woolveridge, Royal Air Force.
- Wing Commander Philip Clermont Livingston, FRCS MRCS LRCR DPH DOMS, Royal Air Force.
- Squadron Leader Kenneth Lenton Boswell, Royal Air Force.
- Squadron Leader Francis Henry Albert Harrison, Royal Air Force.
- Wing Commander Francis William Fellowes Lukis, Royal Australian Air Force.

Civil Division

- Thomas James Addly, SSC JP, Chairman, Edinburgh Insurance Committee. Secretary, Scottish Professional Assistants' Approved Society.
- Francis George Caster Baldwin, Chief Regional Engineer, North Eastern Region, General Post Office.
- Alderman Frederick Bath, JP. Chairman of the Southampton & District Local Employment Committee.
- Percy James Bowie, Head Clerk, Crown Office, Supreme Court of Judicature.
- Crichton Jane Isobel Weir Breen, JP. For political and public services in Fife.
- George Edward Brown, JP. Chairman, Ampthill Rural District Council.
- Robert Lancelot Busby, MC. For political, and public services in Manchester and Salford.
- Albert Canning, MBE, Chief Constable, Metropolitan Police.
- John William Cassels, Director of Agriculture, County Durham. For services in connection with the settlement of unemployed men on the land.
- Stafford Edwin Chandler, ARCS FLS, Principal of the Plant & Animal Products Department of the Imperial Institute.
- Richard Henry Curtis, Chief Officer, Mental Hospitals Department, London County Council.
- Albert Dakin,, Head Master, Stretford Grammar School, Lancashire.
- Alphonso William James Davies, ISO MBE, Honorary Secretary and Treasurer of the Sir Frederick Richards' Memorial Fund. For services to naval charities.
- Thomas Huws Davies, Secretary, Welsh Church Commission.
- Emily Hannah Davis, Secretary of the Artists' General Benevolent Fund.
- Arthur Feirn, Assistant Director of Transport Accounts, Ministry of Transport.
- Peter Copland Flett, JP. For political and public services in Orkney.
- Lancelot Rougier Foster. For political and public services in Sunderland and Houghton-le-Spring.
- Allan Gibb, MBE, District Officer, Unemployment Assistance Board.
- Captain Alan Stewart Giles, MC, Chairman, Birmingham Advisory Committee, Unemployment Assistance Board.
- Captain William Gobdley, MC, Commissioner, No.1 District, St John Ambulance Brigade.
- Francesca Anne Victoria Chaplin Hall, Secretary, Massage Department & School, National Institute for the Blind, Secretary, Association of Certificated Blind Masseurs.
- William Benjamin Hards, Chairman, Navy League Overseas Relief Fund.
- Walter Haward, MB BS MRQS LRCP, Assistant Director of Medical Services, Ministry of Pensions.
- George Robert Henderson. For political and public services in Edinburgh.
- Mark Hodgson, JP. General Secretary, Boilermakers' Society of Great Britain & Ireland.
- John Whitmell Hughes, Principal Finance Officer, Board of Education.
- Frederick Robert Hutchings, Assistant Chief Constable, Devon.
- Alfred William Jarvis, MBE, Deputy Chief Quantity Surveyor, HM Office of Works and Public Buildings.
- Mabel Johnson. For political services.
- Frederick Heron Kerr, Principal Auditor, Exchequer & Audit Department, Northern Ireland.
- Alfred George Kitson, Master Mariner in command of HM Transport Dilwara.
- George Lament, Chief Constable, Motherwell & Wishaw.
- Jurat Philip de Carteret Le Cornu, Lieutenant Bailiff of Jersey.
- Alderman Miriam Lightowler, JP. For political and public services in Halifax.
- Alderman William Edward Lovsey, JP. For political and public services in Birmingham.
- William Henry Ludlow, ARIBA, Architect & Surveyor, General Post Office.
- Albert George Mitchell, MC, Chief Organising Secretary of the Junior Imperial League. For political services.
- Harvey Hugh Montgomerie, Principal, Ministry of Labour.
- Jessie Brown More. For political services in the East of Scotland.
- Frank Leonard Nicholls, JP. For political and public services in Cardiff.
- William Henry Nithsdale, Superintending Inspector, Board of Customs & Excise.
- Robert O'Field Oakley, Principal, Department of Scientific & Industrial Research.
- Elsie Osborn. For public services in Birmingham.
- Nancy Broadfield Parkinson, Honorary Secretary, Hospitality Council of the National Union of Students in London.
- John Price, JP. For charitable and public services in the Rhondda Valley.
- Arthur Reeder, Deputy Director of Statistics, Ministry of Labour.
- Alderman Alexander Rennie, JP. For political and public services in West Lewisham.
- Daniel Robinson, ARCSc, Superintending Examiner, Patent Office, Board of Trade.
- Captain John Couch Adams Roseveare, MICE MInstWE, Chief Drainage Engineer, Ministry of Agriculture & Fisheries.
- Lieutenant-Colonel James Sargent, DSO, Headquarters Staff Officer, Ulster Special Constabulary.
- Alexander Shearer, MB CM, Medical Officer, Department of Health for Scotland.
- Alderman Edward William Kittow Slade, JP. Chairman, National Farmers' Union Cereals Committee.
- Benjamin Spalding Smith, MIEE FInstP, Superintending Scientist, Anti-Submarine Establishment, Portland.
- William Crampton Smith, Rector of the Royal Academy, Inverness.
- Robert Macmorran Stewart, Secretary, British Coal Exporters' Federation.
- Ernest Charles Sergeant Stow, JP. For public services in the East Riding.
- Charles Swinglehurst, Chairman of the Manchester & Salford Hospital Saturday Fund.
- Alderman John Thomas, JP. Chairman, Mid-Glamorgan Advisory Committee, Unemployment Assistance Board.
- Alexander Welsh Thomson, Chief Executive Officer, Military Department, India Office.
- Lady Betty Constance Trafford. For political and public services in East Norfolk.
- Thomas Trott. For political services in connection with the Conservative Club Movement.
- Joseph Henry Powers Turner, President, London and Home Counties Haulage Contractors' Association.
- Charles Oscar Vernede, Chief Examiner, Estate Duty Office, Board of Inland Revenue.
- Arthur Ernest White, Principal, Shrewsbury Technical College.
- Albert Henry Wiseman, JP. For political and public services in East Ham.
- David Wilberforce Young, MBE, Deputy Surveyor of the New Forest, Forestry Commission.
- Fanny Copeland, Reader in English at Ljubljana University, Yugoslavia.
- John Herbert Cubbon, Financial Secretary to the Chinese Maritime Customs.
- Henry Guyatt, MBE, His Majesty's Consul at Corunna.
- Major-Guy Anderson Herbert, MC, one of His Majesty's Consuls in China.
- Alfred Robert Hogg, a British subject resident in Qingdao.
- Arthur Reginald Lambert, Inspector, Plant Observation Section, Gezira Agricultural Research Service, Sudan Government.
- Leslie Mead, Director of the Argentine Association of English Culture, Buenos Aires.
- George Swirede Moleyns Rogers, a British subject resident in Roumania.
- Captain Henry Malcolm Smyth, Assistant Commissioner of the Shanghai Municipal Police.
- Frederick Arthur Waugh, Water Supply Engineer, Public Works Department, Sudan Government.
- Edward Waller Austin, formerly President, Maritime Services Board, State of New South Wales, and Chairman of the Venetian Carnival Committee on the occasion of the celebration of Australia's 150th Anniversary.
- Horace Percy Beaver, formerly Town Clerk of the City of Adelaide, State of South Australia.
- Vera Brown, MD BS, Director of Infant Welfare, Public Health Department, State of Victoria.
- The Venerable Archdeacon Charles Edward Carey-Brenton. For native mission work in Swaziland on behalf of the Church of the Province of South Africa.
- Percy Cunningham Douglas, Deputy Commissioner in Tasmania, Taxation Branch, Commonwealth of Australia.
- The Honourable Maxwell Pollok Dunlop, MLC, Chairman of the Committee controlling Australia's 150th Anniversary celebrations in the country districts in the State of New South Wales.
- Herbert Francis Bradley Fox, Inspector, Board of Education. For services to education in Southern Rhodesia.
- Elizabeth Britomarte James. For social welfare services in the State of Victoria.
- William Henry Jeanes, Secretary of the Australian Board of Cricket Control, and formerly of the Cricket Association in the State of South Australia.
- The Honourable Frederick Percival Kneeshaw, MLC MIE. For services in the State of New South Wales to the Council controlling Australia's 150th Anniversary Celebrations.
- Laurence George Luscombe, Financial Secretary, Basutoland.
- Sadie Macdonald. For social welfare services in the Dominion of New Zealand.
- George Mackaness,, Lecturer-in Charge, Department of English, Teachers' Training College, Sydney, State of New South Wales. For services to education.
- Francis Joseph McKenna, Private Secretary to the Prime Minister of the Commonwealth of Australia.
- James Hugh McPhillimy. For benefactions and public services in the State of Victoria.
- Hugh Godfrey Mundy, Secretary, Department of Agriculture & Lands, Southern Rhodesia.
- Florence Mildred Muscio, Chairman, National Council of Women, State of New South Wales, & Chairman of the Women's Executive Committee & Advisory Council for Australia's 150th Anniversary Celebrations.
- May Martha Parkes. For municipal and charitable services in the State of New South Wales.
- Isabella Younger Ross, MB ChB, Honorary Secretary, Baby Health Centres Association, State of Victoria.
- Michael Sinnott, District Magistrate, Placentia, Newfoundland.
- Mary Gawan Taylor, Secretary, Overseas Nursing Association.
- Arthur William Turner, DSc DVSc, Senior Bacteriologist, Animal Health Division, Council for Scientific & Industrial Research, Commonwealth of Australia.
- James Wallace, JP. Chairman, Otago Education Board, Dominion of New Zealand.
- James Watt, JP. For public welfare services in the Commonwealth of Australia.
- Alfred Yeates. For services to ex-servicemen in the Commonwealth of Australia.
- Jeanne Forster Young. For social welfare services in the Commonwealth of Australia.
- M. R. Ry. Rao Sahib Pathiyil Appu Nayar Avargal, Secretary to the Government of Madras, Legal Department, and Remembrancer of Legal Affairs, Madras.
- No.34518 Lieutenant-Colonel Ambuj Nath Bose, MBE FRCP, Indian Medical Service, Professor of Pathology, Prince of Wales' Medical College, Patna, Bihar.
- Arthur Plumptre Faunce Hamilton, Indian Forest Service, Deputy Conservator of Forests, Hoshiarpur Siwaliks, Punjab.
- John Pirn Watson Johnston, Indian Police, Special Assistant to the Deputy Inspector-General of Police, Criminal Investigation Department, Bihar.
- Alec Houghton Joyce, Information Officer, India Office.
- Pestonji Phirozshah Kapadia, FRIBA, Architect, Bombay.
- Rao Bahadur Ramkrishna Moreshwar Khare, Pleader, Central Provinces and Berar.
- Lieutenant-Colonel Lloyd Kirkwood-Ledger, Indian Medical Service, Civil Surgeon, Peshawar, North-West Frontier Province.
- Major Reginald Maurice Lindsley, AIRO, Commandant, Malwa Bhil Corps, Indore, Central India.
- Rai Bahadur Nagendra Nath Mukherji, Chairman, District Board, Nadia, Bengal.
- Nazir Ahmad, PhD (Cantab) FInstP, Director of the Technological Laboratory, Matunga, Bombay.
- John Oswald, lately Engineer-in-Chief, Lighthouse Department, and Chief Inspector of Lighthouses in British India.
- George Alfred Pearce, Indian Police, Superintendent of Police, United Provinces.
- Clarence Arnold Phillips, MC, Senior Assistant Master, Prince of Wales' Royal Indian Military College, Dehra Dun.
- Khan Bahadur Saiyid Siddiq Hasan, lately His Majesty's Consul, Kandahar.
- Sardar Bahadur Sobha Singh, Government Contractor, Delhi.
- Arthur Carrington Tyndale, Military Accounts Department, Controller of Military Accounts, Northern Command.
- Nevill Vintcent, DFC, Manager, Tata's Aviation Department, Bombay.
- Akbar Ali Adamjee. For public services in Tanganyika Territory.
- George Bryce,, Colonial Agricultural Service, Assistant Director of Agriculture, Nigeria.
- Frederick Augustus William Byron, Superintendent of Broadcasting, Gold Coast.
- Lieutenant-Commander Clement James Charlewood, DSO, Royal Naval Reserve (Ret'd), Port Officer, Zanzibar.
- Percival Martin Cooper, AMInstCE MIM & CyE MIStructE, Chairman of Water Commission, Jamaica.
- Isabella Hardie Curr, MBE LRCP LRCS, in charge of the McLeod Hospital for Women at Inuvil, near Jaffna, Ceylon.
- William Samuel Dickens, MBE, Colonial Police Service, Commissioner of Police, Barbados.
- Phillip Frederick Ellis. For public services in Northern Rhodesia.
- Geoffrey Hammond Frith, Treasurer and Collector of Customs, St Lucia, Windward Islands.
- Harold Mence Gardner, Colonial Forest Service, Conservator of Forests, Kenya.
- Professor Rupert Montgomery Gordon, MD DSc MRCP, Director of Sir A.L. Jones Research Laboratory, Freetown, Sierra Leone.
- Robert Stuart Beaumont Mahony Hickson-Mahony, Colonial Administrative Service, Deputy Provincial Commissioner, Tanganyika Territory.
- John Charles Innes. For public services in Malaya.
- Robert Best Jackson, , Colonial Medical Service, Malariologist, Medical Department, Hong Kong.
- Alfred John Kingsley-Heath, Colonial Police Service, Deputy Inspector General of Police, Palestine.
- Charles Oswald Lelean. For public services in Fiji.
- Captain Herbert Edward Long, Colonial Administrative Service, District Officer, Somaliland Protectorate.
- Reginald Hugh McCleland, LCE, Senior Executive Engineer, Public Works Department, Straits Settlements.
- John Marshall. For public services in Nyasaland.
- Henry John Stephen Norton, MBE, Colonial Administrative Service, Assistant Secretary, Colonial Secretary's Office, Gibraltar.
- James Herbert Peet, Colonial Postal Service, Postmaster, Bahamas.
- Major Malcolm Cecil Sinclair, Civil Secretary, Aden.
- Robert Yelverton Stones, MC MD MRCP, Physician-in-Charge of the Church Missionary Society's Hospital at Namirembe, Uganda Protectorate.
- James Harper Taggart. For public services in Hong Kong.
- John Murchie Wilson, MBE, Colonial Customs Service, Comptroller of Customs, Fiji.
- Norman Wilson Kelly, Burma Frontier Service, Headquarters Assistant, Taunggyi.

Honorary Officers

- Aref Effendi El Aref, MBE, Administrative Officer, Palestine.
- Mitri Hanna, Land Officer, Palestine.
- Israel Rokach, Mayor of Tel Aviv, Palestine.
- Yang Amah Mulia Raja Yusuf ibni Sultan Abdul Jalilal-marhum Rathi Sultan, Raja Bendahara of Perak, Federated Malay States.
- Geoffrey Noel Burden, Colonial Administrative Service, District Officer, Nyasaland Protectorate.
- Sybil Burnside, Clerk, Grade II, Secretariat, Bahamas.
- Kenneth Cleland, Colonial Police Service, Assistant Superintendent of Police, Kenya.
- Cyril Robert Philpot Curran, Assistant Engineer, Public Works Department, Nyasaland Protectorate.
- Ahmed Essad Bey. For public services in Cyprus.
- Clarence Walter Frith, Superintendent of Public Works, Turks & Caicos Islands, Jamaica.
- Henry Langley Wilmot Hayward. For public services in St Vincent, Windward Islands.
- Ethel Hodnett, Welfare (Nursing) Sister, Health Department, Northern Rhodesia.
- The Very Reverend Edward John Holt, Dean and organist of Holy Trinity Cathedral, Trinidad.
- William Gordon Leckie, Colonial Agricultural Service, Senior Agricultural Officer, Kenya.
- Donald Mackinnon. For public services in the British Solomon Islands Protectorate.
- Jane Mahy. For public services in Grenada, Windward Islands.
- Rene Maingard De La Ville Es Offrans. For public services in Mauritius.
- Albion Mends, African Assistant Controller of Posts, Posts & Telegraphs Department, Gold Coast.
- Cuthbert Hugh Norton, District Commissioner, British Guiana.
- Albert Colonridge Panton, Assistant Treasurer, Collector of Customs and Postmaster, Cayman Islands, Jamaica.
- Charles Walker Rozario, Asiatic Traffic Inspector, Federated Malay States Railways.
- William Sellers, Sanitary Superintendent, Grade I, Medical Department, Nigeria.
- Allan Morley Spaar, Relief Works Officer, Ceylon.
- Ellen Thompson, Matron, King George V Merchant Seamen's Memorial Hospital, Malta.
- Harriet Jane Tyler, Matron, Lunatic Asylum, Jamaica.
- Hugh Vanhegan, Assistant Superintendent, Kenya & Uganda Railways and Harbours.
- Reginald Samuel Wheatley, Mechanical Superintendent, Public Works Department, Zanzibar.
- Ernest Jenner Wright, MRCS LRCP, Senior Medical Officer, Sierra Leone.

==== Member of the Order of the British Empire (MBE) ====
Military Division

Royal Navy

- Headmaster Lieutenant-Commander Gordon Lough, Royal Navy.
- Signal Lieutenant Gerald Barton, Royal Navy.
- Commissioned Boatswain Oscar Gerald Foxworthy, Royal Navy (Ret'd).
- Commissioned Engineer Russell John Hugh Duffay, Royal Navy.
- Commissioned Engineer Percy Leonard Tatford, Royal Navy.
- Headmaster Lieutenant William Sydney Edgerton, Royal Australian Navy.
- Commissioned Shipwright Duncan McLeod, Royal Australian Navy.
- Paymaster-Lieutenant Herbert Russell Sleeman, New Zealand Division of the Royal Navy.

Army

- Lieutenant (Assistant Commissary) Leonard Ernest Allinson, Indian Army Corps of Clerks.
- Captain James Baden Penrose Angwin, Royal Engineers.
- No.5766157 Warrant Officer, Class II (Company Sergeant Major) Frederick George Ashby, 5th Battalion, The Royal Norfolk Regiment, Territorial Army.
- Major Matthew Bain, DCM TD, 6th (Lanarkshire) Battalion, The Cameronians (Scottish Rifles), Territorial Army.
- Warrant Officer, Class II (Regimental Quarter Master-Sergeant) Harold Collingwood Bayne, Ceylon Army Service Corps.
- Captain James Bell, BSc ARIBA, 52nd (Lowland) Divisional Engineers, Royal Engineers, Territorial Army.
- Major Edwin Blackwell, TD, retired, late 85th (East Anglian) Field Brigade, Royal Artillery, Territorial Army.
- Major (Quarter-Master) Herbert William Bolton, DSO, 4th Battalion, The Queen's Royal Regiment (West Surrey), Territorial Army (Lieutenant-Colonel, retired pay).
- Captain John Sidney Boulter, TD, St. Bees School Contingent, Junior Division Officers Training Corps.
- Lieutenant (Quarter-Master) Frederick George Bowtell, MC DCM, 50th (The Northamptonshire Regiment) Anti-Aircraft Battalion, Royal Engineers, Territorial Army.
- Major Denys Henry Bramall, 52nd (London) Anti-Aircraft Brigade, Royal Artillery, Territorial Army.
- Major Claude Clifford Hendy Brazier, MIMechE AMIEE, Kent Fortress Engineers, Royal Engineers, Territorial Army.
- No.723529 Warrant Officer, Class II (Battery Sergeant-Major) George William Brown, 58th (Home Counties) Field Brigade, Royal Artillery, Territorial Army.
- No.6641965 Warrant Officer, Class II (Company Sergeant-Major) William Francis Brown, The Rangers, The King's Royal Rifle Corps, Territorial Army.
- Lieutenant (Quarter-Master) Reginald Gerard Verne Burrage, 2nd Battalion, The North Staffordshire Regiment (The Prince of Wales's).
- Captain (Deputy Commissary) William Butler, Indian Army Corps of Clerks.
- Captain (Quarter-Master) Samuel James Caloe, retired, late 4th Battalion, The King's Shropshire Light Infantry, Territorial Army.
- Conductor Elgious Victor Carpenter, Indian Army Corps of Clerks.
- Major Derwent Albert Carse, MC MM TD, 74th (Northumbrian) Field Brigade, Royal Artillery, Territorial Army.
- No.6538043 Warrant Officer, Class II (Company Sergeant-Major) Frederick William Clark, 10th (3rd City of London) Battalion, The Royal Fusiliers (City of London Regiment), Territorial Army.
- No.1660901 Warrant Officer, Class II (Battery-Sergeant-Major) Alfred Edward Cooper, 59th (4th West Lancashire) Medium Brigade, Royal Artillery, Territorial Army.
- Major Vincent Morse Cooper, DSO, Suffolk Fortress Engineers, Royal Engineers, Territorial Army (Commander, retired, Royal Navy).
- Lieutenant (Quarter-Master) Stephen Alfred Cox, 8th Battalion, The Middlesex Regiment (Duke of Cambridge's Own), Territorial Army.
- Captain Graham Warden Cree, 6th Battalion, The Highland Light Infantry (City of Glasgow Regiment), Territorial Army.
- No.7582056 Warrant Officer, Class II (Staff Quarter-Master-Sergeant) James Craig Dalglish, 52nd (Lowland) Divisional Royal Army Ordnance Corps, Royal Army Ordnance Corps, Territorial Army.
- Warrant Officer, Class I (Regimental Sergeant Major) George Noah David, Ceylon Medical Corps.
- No.5493093 Warrant Officer, Class II (Battery Sergeant-Major) Harold Henry Dennis, The Princess Beatrice's (Isle of Wight Rifles) Heavy Brigade, Royal Artillery, Territorial Army.
- Assistant Surgeon, 4th Class, Ernest Percival Denton, Indian Medical Department.
- Lieutenant Norman Lloyd Dexter, MC, late The Sherwood Foresters (Nottinghamshire and Derbyshire Regiment).
- Major Harry Kenneth Dimoline, 59th (4th West Lancashire) Medium Brigade, Royal Artillery, Territorial Army.
- Major Maurice Alfred Hugh Ditton, 6th Battalion, The Essex Regiment, Territorial Army.
- No.2604131 Warrant Officer, Class I (Regimental-Sergeant-Major) Walter Harry Dobson, MC MM, late Grenadier Guards, and Royal Military College.
- Captain John Primrose Douglas, MB, Royal Army Medical Corps.
- Warrant Officer Class I (Staff Sergeant-Major 2nd class) Charles James Farnington, DCM, Australian Instructional Corps, 3rd Military District, Australian Military.
- Temporary Quarter-Master and Honorary Lieutenant Hugh Fraser, Australian Instructional Corps, Adjutant & Quarter-Master, 16th Battalion, 5th Military District, Australian Military Forces.
- Captain Ernest William Gillard, Derby School Contingent, Junior Division Officers Training Corps.
- Major Duncan Archibald Graham, TD, retired, late 6th Battalion, The Highland Light Infantry (City of Glasgow Regiment), Territorial Army.
- Captain (Quarter-Master) Arthur Ernest Gray, MC, retired, late The Leicestershire Yeomanry (Prince Albert's Own) (Hussars), Territorial Army.
- No.4335043 Warrant Officer, Class II (Regimental Quarter-Master Sergeant) Edward Green, 2nd Battalion, The East Yorkshire Regiment (The Duke of York's Own).
- Captain (Deputy Commissary) Charles Hammond, Indian Army Corps of Clerks.
- No.1035382 Warrant Officer, Class II (Battery Sergeant-Major) Charles Lionel Hammond, Royal Artillery.
- No.6077137 Warrant Officer, Class I (Regimental Sergeant-Major) Edward Francis Hartridge, 1st Battalion, The Queen's Royal Regiment (West Surrey).
- Captain Robert William Hellis, TD, 22nd Battalion (Westminster Dragoons), Royal Tank Corps, Territorial Army.
- No.7335980 Warrant Officer, Class II (Quarter Master Sergeant) Sidney Thomas Helm, 140th (County of London) Field Ambulance, Royal Army Medical Corps, Territorial Army.
- No.6745053 Warrant Officer, Class II (Company Sergeant-Major) Joseph John Hemmings, 35th (First Surrey Rifles) Anti Aircraft Battalion, Royal Engineers, Territorial Army.
- Warrant Officer, Class I (Regimental Sergeant Major) Walter Henry Hibbard, MM, Indian Unattached List, Army School of Education, Pachmarhi, India.
- No.528551 Warrant Officer, Class II (Squadron Sergeant-Major) Clifford Holdsworth, The Yorkshire Hussars (Alexandra, Princess of Wales's Own) Yeomanry, Territorial Army.
- No.1663274 Warrant Officer, Class II (Battery Sergeant-Major) Ernest George Holloway, DCM, 73rd Anti-Aircraft Brigade, Royal Artillery, Territorial Army.
- Major James William Holmes, TD, 5th Battalion, The Manchester Regiment, Territorial Army.
- Captain James Vivian Davidson-Houston, Royal Engineers, General Staff Officer 3rd Grade (temporary) Headquarters, British Troops in China.
- The Reverend Benjamin John Isaac,, Chaplain to the Forces, 4th Class, Royal Army Chaplains' Department, Territorial Army.
- Major (Brevet Lieutenant-Colonel) David Ernest Jones, MC, 70th (3rd West Lancashire) Anti-Aircraft Brigade, Royal Artillery, Territorial Army (Major, Regular Army Reserve of Officers, Royal Artillery).
- Captain (Quarter-Master) William John Jones, MC TD, retired, late 7th Battalion, The Worcestershire Regiment, Territorial Army.
- No.1408817 Warrant Officer, Class I (Artificer Sergeant-Major) Russell Kellow, Royal Artillery.
- Captain Reginald John Kimber, 43rd (Wessex) Divisional Royal Army Service Corps, Royal Army Service Corps, Territorial Army.
- Captain (Quarter-Master) Laurence Matthias Kirby, MM, The North Somerset Yeomanry (Dragoons), Territorial Army.
- Lieutenant (Quarter-Master) Robert Knight, The Nottinghamshire Yeomanry (Sherwood Rangers) (Hussars), Territorial Army.
- Subadar-Major (Honorary Captain) Lai Khanr Bahadur, OBI, retired, late 1st Battalion, 8th Punjab Regiment, Indian Army.
- Captain John David Alexander Lamont, Royal Artillery, attached, The Sierra Leone Battalion, Royal West African Frontier Force.
- Captain (Quarter-Master) Thomas Victor Laverack, MM, 1st Battalion, The Duke of Wellington's Regiment (West Riding).
- No.2556202 Warrant Officer, Class II (Squadron Sergeant-Major) John Henry Lay, MC, 2nd Cavalry (Middlesex Yeomanry) Divisional Signals, Royal Corps of Signals, Territorial Army.
- Captain Herbert Aubrey Lee, All Hallows School Contingent, Junior Division Officers Training Corps.
- No.725787 Warrant Officer, Class II (Battery Sergeant-Major) George Levack, 68th (South Midland) Field Brigade, Royal Artillery, Territorial Army.
- No.5330163 Warrant Officer, Class II (Company Sergeant-Major) Herbert Longhurst, 4th Battalion, The Royal Berkshire Regiment (Princess Charlotte of Wales's), Territorial Army.
- Regimental Sergeant-Major John Lord, Bechuanaland Protectorate Police.
- Captain (Quarter-Master) Robert William Lyne, 4th Battalion, The Wiltshire Regiment (Duke of Edinburgh's), Territorial Army.
- Major William Hay Mackenzie, BSc AMICE, City of Edinburgh Fortress Engineers, Royal Engineers, Territorial Army.
- Major (Quarter-Master) William Edward Perry Manley, DCM, Retired, late 5th (Prince of Wales's) Battalion, The Devonshire Regiment, Territorial Army.
- Lieutenant (Quarter-Master) John James Marshall, 11th Hussars (Prince Albert's Own).
- Warrant Officer, Class I (Regimental Sergeant Major) Albert Edward McCarthy, The Malay Regiment.
- Lieutenant Robert Peter McMullen, 1st Battalion, The Hertfordshire Regiment, Territorial Army.
- Major Richard John Measures, 94th (Queen's Own Dorset Yeomanry) Field Brigade, Royal Artillery, Territorial Army.
- No.960535 Warrant Officer, Class II (Battery Sergeant-Major) Charles Robert Middlemiss, 64th (7th London) Field Brigade, Royal Artillery, Territorial Army.
- Captain (Quarter-Master) Robert Arthur Morrow, retired pay, Regular Army Reserve of Officers, late Royal Horse Artillery.
- Captain James Alexander Oliver, 4th/5th (Dundee & Angus) Battalion, The Black Watch (Royal Highland Regiment), Territorial Army.
- Major George John Morley Peel, TD, 1st Anti-Aircraft Divisional Signals, Royal Corps of Signals, Territorial Army.
- Captain Arthur Raymond Pepin, Marlborough College Contingent, Junior Division Officers Training Corps.
- Jemadar Jugti Ram, 18th King Edward VII's Own Cavalry, Indian Army, Jemadar Quarter-Master, Indian Military Academy, Dehra Dun, India.
- Captain (Deputy Commissary) John Lawrence Randall, retired, late Indian Army Ordnance Corps.
- Captain Tom Gordon Rennie, The Black Watch (Royal Highland Regiment), General Staff Officer, 3rd Grade, The War Office.
- No.396601 Warrant Officer, Class II (Farrier Quarter-Master Sergeant) Robert Wallace Robertson, The Scottish Horse, Scouts, Territorial Army.
- No.7657558 Warrant Officer, Class II (Staff Quarter-Master Sergeant) Henry Herbert Rowland, Royal Army Pay Corps.
- Major Herbert Wynne Scriven, 7th (Leeds Rifles) Battalion, The West Yorkshire Regiment (The Prince of Wales's Own), Territorial Army.
- Major Robert Amyas Seel, TD, 82nd (Welsh) Field Brigade, Royal Artillery, Territorial Army.
- Captain William Philip Selbie, MC , Army Educational Corps.
- Major (Commissary) Reginald James Shearcroft, Indian Miscellaneous List, Assistant Secretary, Defence Department, India.
- Captain John Denham Shorter, AFC, Shanghai Volunteer Corps.
- No.7576596 Warrant Officer Class II (Staff Quarter-Master-Sergeant) (Fitter) Hubert John Shrapnel, Royal Army Ordnance Corps.
- Captain Sydney Clifford Simons, 5th (Glamorgan) Battalion, The Welch Regiment, Territorial Army.
- Major Charles Holdaway Kirby Smith, Territorial Army Reserve of Officers, late Officer Commanding, 2nd Cavalry Divisional Royal Army Ordnance Corps, Territorial Army.
- Captain Geoffrey Henry Rutherfoord Pye Smith, Adjutant, Suffolk Heavy Brigade, Royal Artillery, Territorial Army.
- Captain Richard Browning-Smith, TD, Territorial Army Reserve of Officers, late 104th (Essex Yeomanry) Army Field Brigade, Royal Artillery, Territorial Army.
- Lieutenant (Quarter-Master) Frank Tebbs, DCM, 49th (West Riding) 205th Medium Artillery Signal Section Divisional Signals, Royal Corps of Signals, Territorial Army.
- Captain Arthur Tilly, TD, St. Edwards School Contingent, Junior Division Officers Training Corps.
- No.5097245 Warrant Officer Class II (Company Sergeant Major) Francis Townley, MC DCM, 45th (The Royal Warwickshire Regiment) Anti-Aircraft Battalion, Royal Engineers, Territorial Army.
- Captain Leslie Nelson Turner, TD, Bury Grammar School Contingent, Junior Division Officers Training Corps.
- Captain (Quarter-Master) Simon Tykiff, 7th Battalion, The Duke of Wellington's Regiment (West Riding), Territorial Army.
- Captain Cecil Elsmie Howard-Vyse, Royal Engineers.
- No.2314083 Warrant Officer Class II (Foreman of Signals Quarter-Master-Sergeant) Alfred Russell Walker, Royal Corps of Signals.
- Major Joseph Henry Ernest Webb, 2nd Battalion, The Monmouthshire Regiment, Territorial Army.
- Warrant Officer Class I (Staff Sergeant-Major 2nd Class) Sydney Hamilton Welch, Australian Instructional Corps, 6th Military District, Australian Military Forces.
- No.1660523 Warrant Officer Class II (Battery Sergeant Major) Bernard Stanley Widdowson, East Riding Heavy Brigade, Royal Artillery, Territorial Army.
- No.5174457 Warrant Officer Class II (Company Sergeant-Major) Samuel John Wilcox, 5th Battalion, The Gloucestershire Regiment, Territorial Army.
- Captain (Quarter-Master) Alexander Wilkinson, 6th/7th (Perth & Fife) Battalion, The Black Watch (Royal Highland Regiment), Territorial Army.
- No.6840784 Warrant Officer Class II (Company Sergeant-Major) Frederick Charles Williams, 1st Battalion, The King's Royal Rifle Corps.
- Major Thomas Uril Wilson, 101st (Queen's Own Royal Glasgow Yeomanry) Army Field Brigade, Royal Artillery, Territorial Army.
- The Reverend William Ewart Worsley, MC, Chaplain to the Forces 4th Class, Royal Army Chaplains' Department, Territorial Army.

Royal Air Force

- Flight Lieutenant Alfred Hardwicke Marsack.
- Flying Officer Charles Harold Ervin Lyster.
- Flying Officer Francis William George Aggett.
- Warrant Officer William Charles Billing.
- Warrant Officer Eugene Jack Vivian.
- Warrant Officer Wilfrid Harry Reed.
- Warrant Officer Frederick Martin Weiss.
- Flying Officer Leonard Waller Heathcote, Royal Australian Air Force.
- Warrant Officer Ernest Edward Lane, Royal Australian Air Force.
- Warrant Officer William Stanley Simpson, Royal New Zealand Air Force.

Civil Division

- Charles Stewart Agnew, BE, Senior Architect, Ministry of Finance, Northern Ireland.
- Harold Ardern, AMIMechE, Director of Public Cleansing, City of Westminster, Honorary Secretary of the Institute of Public Cleansing.
- Arthur Charles Baker, Staff Officer, Office of the Chief Inspector of Taxes, Board of Inland Revenue.
- Charles Harry Barnes, Clerk, Higher Grade, Office of the Special Commissioners of Income Tax, Board of Inland Revenue.
- Percival Henry Alder-Barrett, Honorary Secretary, Hereford Savings Committee.
- Harry Battley, Lately Superintendent, Metropolitan Police.
- Allan Beaton. For political services in the East of Scotland.
- George Horatio Bibbings. For political services.
- Joseph Frearson Blocksidge, Assistant Inspector, Board of Education.
- Frederick Hugh Bowyer. For political and public services in Southwark.
- Daisy Florence Mary Brown, Superintendent of Typists, Cabinet Office.
- Robert Bryson Brown, Secretary of the Documentary Committee of the Chamber of Shipping. Lately Joint Secretary of the Tramp Shipping Subsidy Committee.
- Gerald Browne, Editor of Debates, Parliament of Northern Ireland.
- Donald Burden, District Postmaster, Western District Office, London Postal Region, General Post Office.
- Allan Campbell, Superintendent, Edinburgh City Police.
- Albert Victor Chamberlain, Secretary to the Lord Mayor of Cardiff.
- Frederick Charles Chapman, Headmaster, York Fishergate Senior School.
- Gregory John Edmonds Chase, Officer, Board of Customs & Excise.
- Laura Angel Hallett Clifford, Chairman of the Women's Sub-Committee of the Whitehaven Local Employment Committee.
- Charles Aubrey Collier, Staff Officer, Board of Trade.
- Frank Evered Cook, Senior Staff Officer, Mines Department.
- John Charles Coulson, Flight Lieutenant, Royal Air Force, retired, Technical Assistant, Signals Branch, Air Ministry.
- Percy Coy, Registrar of Births & Deaths, Warwick.
- Captain Rhys Wiltshire Davies, FSI FAI, Lands Officer, Air Ministry.
- Albert Diggle, First Class Officer, Ministry of Labour Manager of the Bolton Employment Exchange.
- Catherine Smart Dow, Superintendent of the Gilshochill Approved Girls' School, Glasgow.
- Rowland Harding Egerton, Headmaster, Wykeham Senior School, Willesden.
- John Joseph Fogarty, Higher Clerical Officer, Department of Agriculture for Scotland.
- William George Gant, Staff Officer, Treasury.
- Reginald Gibson, Senior Executive Officer, Board of Customs & Excise.
- Oscar Leonard Gill, Horticultural Officer, Belgium and Germany, Imperial War Graves Commission.
- Irene Lola Hilda Grand. For political services.
- Constance Isabel Green. For political and public services in Abingdon, Berkshire.
- William Greene, Chairman, Stoke-on-Trent, Cheadle & District War Pensions Committee.
- Harry Clifford Greenfield, Stationmaster, Waterloo station. For services in connection with oversea visitors.
- William Griffiths. For political services in East Rhondda.
- Ernest Edward Grundy. For political and public services in the Woodbridge division of Suffolk.
- Elsie Harral, Headmistress, Holy Trinity Church of England Infants' School, Blackburn.
- Mary J. B. Harries. For political and public services in Llanelly.
- William George Harris, Chairman, Islington War Pensions Committee.
- William Thomson Harrower, Senior Examiner, Passport Office.
- Charles Henry Harvey, JP. For political and public services in Leominster.
- Robert Henry Haylett, Senior Executive Officer, Mercantile Marine Department, Board of Trade.
- Major Edward Robert Henry Herbert. For political and public services in the Wrekin.
- Stanley Robert Hewitson, Headmaster, Royal Hospital School, Holbrook.
- The Reverend Fred Hibbert, Chairman of the Blackpool Juvenile Advisory Committee.
- John Hood, Staff Officer, District Manager's Office, South Midland District, Reading, General Post Office.
- Margaret Horn, JP, Honorary Organiser of the Westminster Health Society. For services in connection with child welfare.
- Richard Houghton. For political services in Lancashire.
- Annie Hudson. For political and public services in Wakefield.
- Nellie Arthur Hutchinson, Chairman, Children's Committee of the Grantham, Boston & District War Pensions Committee.
- Mabel Leonora Jackson. For political and public services in Manchester & District.
- William Henry Jenkins, Chief Superintendent, Head Post Office, Newport, Monmouthshire.
- Emily Frances Kearton. For political and public services in Hastings.
- Elizabeth Mercer Langdon, Family Welfare Worker, Portsmouth Port Division, Admiralty.
- Harry Llewellyn Lawrence, Crop Reporter, Lincolnshire, Ministry of Agriculture & Fisheries.
- Charles Laywood, Chief Range Officer of the Society of Miniature Rifle Clubs. Secretary of the Yorkshire Miniature Rifle Association.
- William Lynn, 1st Class District Inspector, Royal Ulster Constabulary.
- Michael Dodds McCarthy. For political services in Durham.
- Ewen McCaskill, Superintendent, Maryhill Division, Glasgow City Police.
- Elsie Anne McCleverty, Inspector (Insurance Branch), Ministry of Health.
- Councillor Alexander MacDonald. For political and public services in Roxburgh and Selkirk.
- Joseph Whitehorn Mercer, JP, Chairman of the Acton Local Employment Committee.
- Alderman Arthur Samuel Moulton, JP. For political and public services in Huddersfield.
- Ella Munro, District Nurse in Foula and Fair Isle, Shetland.
- John Drummond Murdoch, Assistant Architect, Grade I, HM Office of Works and Public Buildings.
- Thomas William Nevard, FSS, Senior Executive Officer, Unemployment Assistance Board.
- Alice Eleanor Norford, Clerical Officer, Home Office.
- Mary Lucy Bennett Pardoe. For political services in Peckham.
- James Paterson, Principal Sheriff Clerk Depute of Lanarkshire.
- Alfred Claud Peachey, Assistant Postmaster, Liverpool General Post Office.
- Councillor Sidney Perkins. For political and public services in Northampton.
- Charles Crunden Phelps, Commandant, Metropolitan Special Constabulary.
- Matthew John Potts, Manager of Glentress Instructional Centre, Ministry of Labour.
- George Henry Purvis. For public services in Monmouthshire, especially among the unemployed.
- Walter William Burton Ranee, Staff Clerk, War Office.
- Albert Edward Page Reynolds, Clerical Officer (Higher Grade), Dominions Office & Colonial Office.
- Marion Cassels Ritchie, Organising Secretary of the Women's Section, Empire Exhibition, Scotland.
- Florence Robertson, JP. For political and public services in South Shields.
- Henry Robertson, FEIS, Chairman of the South Ayrshire Local Savings Committee.
- Mary Emily Scott, Assistant Secretary of the Emergency Help Committee of the Joint Council of the Order of St John of Jerusalem and the British Red Cross Society.
- Reginald John Shambrook, Headmaster, Acland Central School, London.
- Stanley George Shaw, JP. A member of the Bacon Consultative Committee, Board of Trade.
- William Repulse Shenton, Staff Officer, Grade II, Ministry of Transport.
- Maud Mary Spencer, lately Clerical Officer, Ministry of Pensions.
- Elsie Isabel Sprott, Assistant (Women's Interests), Public Relations Division, British Broadcasting Corporation.
- William Henry Stevens, Telegraph Traffic Superintendent, South Eastern Surveyor's District, General Post Office.
- Joseph Stoddart, Senior Marketing Officer, Ministry of Agriculture & Fisheries.
- Nathan Sutton, FAI, Superintending Estate Surveyor, HM Office of Works & Public Buildings.
- William Gordon Syme, JP. For political services in Edinburgh.
- Cicely Ursula Tafe, Matron, The National Hospital for Diseases of the Nervous System.
- Maggie Taylor, Headmistress, Campton Junior Mixed Council School, Bedfordshire.
- Councillor Thomas Thomas, Chairman of the Ebbw Vale Local Employment Committee.
- Thomas Topping, Chief Sanitary Inspector, Rochester City Council.
- George Frederic Turner, LRIBA. For political services in South Oxfordshire.
- John Walker, Vice-Chairman of the Dundee & District Local Employment Committee.
- Ida, Alderman Mrs Warner, JP. For political and public services in Leicester.
- Margaret Helen Waterfield, Honorary Secretary of the Canterbury & Alford Aid Society.
- Walter Wells, Superintendent and Deputy Chief Constable, Dumbarton County Police.
- Arthur Charles White, Superintendent and Deputy Chief Constable, Buckinghamshire Constabulary.
- Blanche Winsland Williams, JP. For political and public services in Romford, Essex.
- Joseph Rowland Williams, Senior Staff Officer, Ministry of Transport Clerk to the Yorkshire Area, Traffic Commissioners.
- James Wilson, FSI FLAS, Command Land Agent, Scottish Command, War Office.
- Jeanie Dickie Wilson, Clerk to the Governor of Northern Ireland.
- Herman Frederick Baker, Assistant Secretary of the British Chamber of Commerce, Shanghai.
- George Albert Clark, Chief Accountant, Public Works Department, Sudan.
- Emily Collins, a British subject resident in Siam.
- Mary Josephine de Juan, Clerk at His Majesty's Embassy at Barcelona.
- No.34518 The Reverend Thomas Ward Hall,, Chaplain to the Mission to Seamen, Buenos Aires.
- Robert Stanley Heaney, Higher Clerical Officer at His Majesty's Consulate-General at Shanghai.
- Alfred Henry Norris, British Vice-Consul at São Paulo.
- Ernest Charles Reed, a British subject resident in Khartoum.
- Catherine Russell, a British subject resident in Lisbon.
- Paul Schoedelin, British Vice-Consul at Bayonne.
- William Coxon Scott, Accountant to His Majesty's Consulate-General at Shanghai.
- Frederick James Smith, British Vice Consul at Zurich.
- Eleanor Gertrude Whitney, a British subject resident in Shanghai.
- Harold George Alderson, President, Olympic Council, State of New South Wales.
- Elsie Euphemia Andrews, formerly Infant Mistress, Fitzroy School, New Plymouth, Dominion of New Zealand.
- Captain Francis Joseph Bayldon. For services in the State of New South Wales in connection with the nautical features, of Australia's 150th Anniversary Celebrations.
- Colonel Robert Henry Beardsmore, DSO VD, Member of the Superannuation Board, State of New South Wales, and Honorary Treasurer of the Council controlling Australia's 150th Anniversary Celebrations.
- Harald Arthur Bowden. For services in connection with patriotic movements in the State of New South Wales and as Chairman of the "Pageant of Nations" Committee, Australia's 150th Anniversary Celebrations.
- Robina Thomson Cameron, District Health Nurse, Rotorua, Dominion of New, Zealand.
- Mary Chambers, Honorary Secretary, Amateur Swimming Association, State of New South Wales.
- James John Collins, Honorary Producer of official pageants at Sydney, State of New South Wales, on the occasion of Australia's 150th Anniversary Celebrations.
- John Connell. For social welfare services in the Dominion of New Zealand.
- Frances Eileen Craig. For services in connection with social welfare and charitable organisations in the Commonwealth of Australia.
- Mabel Craven-Griffiths. For social and child welfare services in the Commonwealth of Australia.
- Ethel Dalton, Stenographer and Confidential Typist to the Governor, State of Victoria.
- Katharina Margarita Finnane, Matron, Mental Hospital, Porirua, Dominion of New Zealand.
- William Henry Gibson, JP. Postal Investigation Officer, Postmaster-General's Department, Commonwealth of Australia.
- Elmer Rennie Harris Glew. For services to blinded ex-servicemen in the Commonwealth of Australia.
- Evelyn Haile. For maternity work in the Bechuanaland Protectorate.
- Stanus William Hedger, Superintendent and secretary of the Royal Victorian Institute for the Blind, State of Victoria.
- William Wilson Hill. For public services in the State of New South Wales.
- Clarence Eric Strauss Houghton, Acting First Clerk, Department of Agriculture, State of New South Wales, and Honorary Secretary of the "Pageant of Nations" Committee, Australia's 150th Anniversary Celebrations.
- Cathrine Jenner. For services to ex-servicemen in the Commonwealth of Australia.
- Marion Knowles, a well-known Australian writer of books for girls.
- Alfred Thomas Warner McGuinness, of Zeehan, State of Tasmania. For social welfare services.
- Mary Martin, Matron, Botsabelo Leper Asylum, Basutoland.
- John James Meagher, Inquiry Officer, Premier's Department, and Honorary Secretary of the Public Service Band, State of Victoria.
- Alfred Metford, Commissioner of Pensions and Maternity Allowances, Commonwealth of Australia.
- James Henry O'Donnell, formerly Assistant Under-Secretary, Department of Lands and Survey, Dominion of New Zealand.
- William George Piper, Postmaster, Canberra, Commonwealth of Australia.
- Elizabeth Rose, School Teacher, Grand Bank, Newfoundland. For loyal and devoted services.
- Allan Bruce Shaw, Assistant Secretary, Maritime Services Board, State of New South Wales, and Secretary of the Water Pageants Committee, Australia's 150th Anniversary Celebrations.
- Alderman Frank Broome Wright, Deputy Mayor of Marrickville, State of New South Wales. For services in connection with Australia's 150th Anniversary Celebrations.
- Anne Elizabeth Burns, Chief Superintendent of Typists, Office of the High Commissioner for India.
- Margaret Reid Ladden (Wife of W. W. Ladden, OBE, Managing Director, Messrs. Simpson & Co. Ltd.), Madras.
- Lily Adelaide Marion Macgregor, Matron, Irwin Hospital, Amravati, Central Provinces and Berar.
- Hasina Murshed, Member of the Bengal Legislative Assembly; Honorary Presidency Magistrate, Central Children's Court, Calcutta; Member, Advisory Board of Women's Education, Bengal.
- Jahan Ara, Begum Shah Nawaz, Parliamentary Secretary to the Punjab Ministry, Punjab.
- Teresa Jadwiga Subramania Iyer, MRCS (Eng) LRCP (Lond), BS (Lond), Director, Maternity and Child Welfare Section of the United Provinces Branch of the Indian Red Cross Society.
- Rai Bahadur Jitendra Math Banarji, Deputy Superintendent of Police, United Provinces.
- Rai Bahadur Nirmal Shib Banerjee, Zamindar, Birbhum District, Bengal.
- Captain Ephraim Benjamin, AIRO, Assistant Director of Public Health, Sind.
- Captain Alfred James Curtis, AIRO, Brigade Major, Rampur State Forces.
- Percy Bertram Dell, Higher Clerical Officer, Office of the High Commissioner for India.
- Shantaram Ramkrishna Deshpande, Assistant Commissioner of Labour, Bombay.
- Khan Bahadur Dilawar Khan, Officiating Assistant Commissioner, North-West Frontier Province.
- Nblasco Peter D'Souza, Engineer, Government Central Distillery, Nasik Road, Bombay.
- Hira-Lall Dutta, Provincial Agricultural Service, Deputy Director of Agriculture, Orissa.
- Wrey Edward Hanby, Municipal Commissioner, Dehra Dun, United Provinces.
- John Emmanuel Reid Heppolette, Indian Medical Department, Clinical Assistant to the Professor of Midwifery, King Edward Medical College, Lahore, Punjab.
- Lieutenant (Assistant Surgeon) Ralph Holmes, Indian Medical Department, Quarantine Medical Officer, Bahrain, and Medical Officer-in-Charge, Victoria Memorial Hospital, Bahrain, Persian Gulf.
- The Reverend John Lewis Jenkins, River Chaplain (Church of England) and Secretary, Seamen's Welfare Association, Bengal.
- Nawab Mir Mahdi Ali Khan, lately Honorary Magistrate, Amravati, Central Provinces & Berar.
- Louis John Masearenhas, lately Secretary, Karachi Port Trust.
- Nowsherwan Aspandiar Mehrban, Assistant Commissioner of Labour, Bombay.
- Sisir Kumar Mitra,, Professor of Physics in the University of Calcutta.
- William Herbert Morris, Head Engineer, His Majesty's Mint, Bombay.
- Evelyn St Ormond Sylvester Nicholas, Honorary Presidency Magistrate, Madras.
- Konnanath Ramakrishna Menon, Deputy Military Accountant-General (Junior), Military Accounts Department.
- Mr. Ry Krishnaswami Ayyar Ramayya Avargal, Paddy Specialist at the Agricultural College & Research Institute, Coimbatore, Madras.
- Krishna Chandra Roy Chaudhuri, Merchant and Member of the Legislative Council, Bengal.
- Anthony Frederick Saldatiha, Superintendent of Police, Finger Print Bureau, Poona, Bombay.
- Edwin Sheehy, Superintendent of Police, Motor Vehicles Department, Bombay.
- Khan Bahadur Sher Ali Khan, Head of the Khalil Tribe, North-West Frontier Province.
- Robert Limond Simpson, Deputy Assistant Controller of Military Accounts, Military Accounts Department.
- Ved Pall Sondhi, FGS, Geologist, Geological Survey of India.
- Rai Bahadur Lakshmi Narayan Sukhani, Banker and Merchant, Bengal.
- Joseph Watson, Confidential Assistant to the Governor of Bombay.
- William Walter Bachelor, Verification Officer, Audit Department, Singapore, Straits Settlements.
- John Samuel Morris, Superintendent of Camp Jails, Mokpalin.

Honorary Members

- Sheikh Seif bin Suleiman el-Busaidi, a Member of the Legislative Council of Zanzibar.
- Mahomed Daud bin Salim, Datoh Istiadat, Kelantan, Malay States.
- Janardan Sitaram Vaidya, Assistant Surgeon, Medical Department, Somaliland Protectorate.

=== Kaisar-i-Hind Medal (First Class) ===
For public services in India

- Jane Leeke Latham, Social Worker, Nasik, Bombay.
- Marjorie Macpherson, Provincial Commissioner, Girl Guides Association, Lahore, Punjab.
- Annie Middleton (wife of R. H. Middleton, late Chief Engineer, Bombay, Baroda & Central India Railway).
- Shrimati Soubhagyavati Laxmidevi Naik Nimbalkar, Rani of Phaltan, Deccan States.
- Mary Estelle Shannon,, Principal, Isabella Thoburn College, Lucknow, United Provinces.
- Catherine Tyzack, Matron, Medical College Hospital, Patna, Bihar.
- The Reverend Henry Cecil Duncan, Head of the Scottish Mission, Darjeeling, Bengal.
- The Reverend Doctor Alfred George Hogg, lately Principal, Madras Christian College, Madras.
- The Reverend John Stirling Morley Hooper, General Secretary of the Bible Society for India & Ceylon, Central Provinces & Berar.
- Hugh Tufnell-Barrett, Indian Civil Service, District Magistrate, Bakarganj, Bengal.

==== Bar to the Kaisar-i-Hind Medal (First Class) ====
- Eleanor McDougal, Principal, Women's Christian College, Madras.

=== Companion of the Imperial Service Order (ISO) ===
Home Civil Service

- George James Allen, MBE, Chief Accountant, Ministry of Health.
- Ernest Hick Bennett, MBE, Inspector of Rates, Rating of Government Property Department.
- Ernest Charles Brewer, Head of the Elementary Schools Section, Board of Education.
- David Alexander Duncan, Deputy Principal Clerk, Court of Session, Edinburgh.
- John Benjamin Gotts, OBE, Assistant Controller, HM Stationery Office.
- Frank Wernham Gutridge, Principal Clerk, Public Works Loan Board.
- Alban Edward John Harris, lately Chief Clerk and Marshal, Admiralty Registry, Supreme Court of Judicature.
- Godfrey Thomas Jones, Assistant Director of Contracts, Air Ministry.
- Alexander Mackenzie, Assistant Principal Clerk, National Debt Office.
- Athelstan Vernon Masham, Accountant, Official Trustees' Department, Charity Commission.
- John James Maxwell, Controller of Stores & Manufactures, Prison Commission.
- Albert Robert Myers, OBE FSI ARIBA, lately Senior Architect, HM Office of Works & Public Buildings.
- Stephen Edward Penfold, lately First Class Officer, Ministry of Labour.
- Archibald William Purdye, Deputy Inspector-General of Waterguard, Board of Customs & Excise.
- Douglas Aikenhead Stroud,, Assistant Solicitor, General Post Office.

Dominions

- Frederick John Batt, Auditor-General, State of Tasmania.
- Frank Jenner, District Commissioner, Basutoland.
- John Elliott Monfries, Deputy Director in Tasmania, Postmaster-General's Department, Commonwealth of Australia.
- Arthur Percival, Surveyor-General and Chief Property Officer, Department of the Interior, Commonwealth of Australia.

Indian Civil Services

- Robert Relton de Relton a-Ababrelton, Superintendent, Telegraph & Mails Branch and Clerk of the Codes, India Office.
- Sidney Charles Apps Schofield, Higher Executive Officer, Accountant-General's Department, India Office.
- James Augustus Barber, Superintendent in the Public Works Department Secretariat, Buildings & Roads Branch, Punjab.
- Rai Bahadur Anant Prasad Dube, Assistant Secretary to the Government of India in the Defence Department.
- Charles Wilson Jones, Head Assistant, Office of the Military Secretaryto His, Excellency the Governor of the United Provinces.
- Rabindra Nath Roy, Deputy Registrar of Co-operative Societies, Bengal.

Burma

- Joseph Francis Blake, Assistant Commissioner of Income Tax, Rangoon.
- Hugh McGregor Elliot, Assistant Secretary, Burma Legislature.

Colonies, Protectorates, etc.

- Augustus Theodore Adu Beckley, Office Assistant, Northern Province, Sierra Leone.
- Victor Colin Curnock, Colonial Police Service, Superintendent of Police, Nyasaland.
- John Reginald Farnum, Chief Clerk, Surgeon-General's Office, British Guiana.
- Reginald Honon Fletcher, Colonial Postal Service Postmaster, Jamaica.
- John William Francis, Principal, Government African School, Machakos, Kenya.
- Thomas Miller Logan, Chief Accountant, Public Works Department, Gold Coast.
- George Roberts, Director of Public Works, Falkland Islands.
- Arthur Hugh Donald le Poer Trench, lately Colonial Agricultural Service, Senior Coffee Officer, Kenya.

=== Imperial Service Medal ===
Indian Civil Services
In recognition of long and meritorious service:

- Munshi Abdul Jabbar, Jemadar, Office of the Director-General, Posts & Telegraphs.
- Abdul Khadir, Amin, District Court, Guntur, Madras.
- Allah Ditta, Headworks Jemadar, Marala, Upper Chenab Canal Circle, Punjab.
- Havatkhan Sardarkhan, Excise Jemadar, Ahmednagar, Bombay.
- Etsisao Lhota, Interpreter, Mokokchung, Naga Hills, Assam.
- Nasir Khan, Chaprassi, Patiala Division, Sirhind Canal Circle, Public Works Department, Punjab.
- Safiuddin, Jemadar, Office of the District Magistrate, Rajshahi District, Bengal.
- Taj Muhammad, Chief Head Warder, Borstal Institution, Lahore, Punjab.
- John Edwin Tonks, First Class Messenger, Office of the High Commissioner for India.

=== British Empire Medal (BEM) ===
Military Division

Royal Navy

- Samuel Lee, Petty Officer Writer, ONP/MX46341.
- Douglas Maclure, Sick Berth Attendant, ONC/MX49870.
- Hugh Arthur Kilpatrick, Chief Petty Officer Writer, ON11319, Royal Australian Navy.

Army

- No.S/13252 Sergeant Robert Frederick James Badcock, Royal Army Service Corps.
- No.7011605 Rifleman David Barbour, 2nd Battalion, The Royal Ulster Rifles.
- No.2307911 Company Quarter-Master-Sergeant Gordon Ewart Diamond, Royal Corps of Signals.
- No.4793939 Sergeant Ernest Leslie Elkington, The Lincolnshire Regiment (attached Iraq Levies).
- No.7011606 Lance-Corporal Hugh Graham, 1st Battalion, The Royal Ulster Rifles.
- Staff-Sergeant Elias Hobby, 1st Heavy Brigade, Royal Australian Artillery Regiment.
- No.1670939 Battery Quarter-Master-Sergeant Richard Hughes, 61st Carnarvon & Denbigh (Yeomanry) Medium Brigade, Royal Artillery, Territorial Army.
- No.7011678 Rifleman John McGuire, 2nd Battalion, The Royal Ulster Rifles.
- No.S/52080 Sergeant Albert Ralph Parsons, Royal Army Service Corps.
- No.1870032 Sapper John Rowland, Royal Engineers.
- Staff-Sergeant-Instructor Mahamed Saaid bin Mat Amin, 1st (Perak) Battalion, Federated Malay States Volunteer Force.
- No.3445816 Fusilier Richard William Sheldon, 1st Battalion, The Lancashire Fusiliers.
- Colour-Sergeant Abraham David Stevenson, Malacca Volunteer Corps, 4th Battalion, Straits Settlements Volunteer Force.
- No.S/7942 Staff-Sergeant George Redvers Upton, Royal Army Service Corps.
- No.2200685 Company Quarter-Master-Sergeant William Edward Widdowfield, North Riding Fortress Engineers, Royal Engineers, Territorial Army.

Royal Air Force

- 343924 Flight Sergeant Henry Moore Baker.
- 335800 Flight Sergeant Valentine Ivor Cecil Alford Ball.
- 162784 Flight Sergeant Harold Perring Matthews.
- 241919 Flight Sergeant William Solomon Reed.
- 365347 Flight Sergeant Douglas George Viney.
- 358701 Sergeant Joseph Frederick Brown.
- 562112 Sergeant William Robert Owen Frame.
- 354116 Sergeant Harold Sissons.
- 360000 Corporal (now Acting Sergeant) William Thomas Bougourd.
- 516362 Aircraftman 1st Class Frederick William Holden.
- 525488 Aircraftman 2nd Class Jack Guest.

Civil Division

- William Bell, Overseer, Sorting Office, Newcastle, General Post Office.
- Charles James Connelly, Skilled Workman, Class I, Belfast, General Post Office.
- Elizabeth Gray, Assistant Supervisor (Telephones), Class II, Glasgow, General Post Office.
- William Jolly, General Foreman, Messrs Cowiesons Ltd., contractors. For services in the construction of the Empire Exhibition, Scotland.
- Charles Henry Lynch, Adult Messenger, Accountant General's Department, General Post Office.
- Walter Davidson McEwan, Foreman Joiner, Crowley, Russell & Co., contractors. For services in the construction of the Empire Exhibition, Scotland.
- Dorothy Eileen O'Regan, Assistant Supervisor, Central Telegraph Office, General Post Office.
- Thomas Pollock, MM, Chief Civilian Instructor, Army Vocational Training Centre, Aldershot.
- Kathleen Eva Roche, Matron, Savings Bank Department, General Post Office.
- Denis Rodgers, Foreman Erector, Redpath, Brown & Co., contractors. For services in the construction of the Empire Exhibition, Scotland.
- William Edward Wakefield, lately Architectural and Civil Engineering Assistant, Grade II, Office of the Commander, Royal Engineers, Catterick Camp.
- Harold Wale, Sorting Clerk and Telegraphist, Worcester, General Post Office.
- Stephen Woodgate, Foreman of Works, HM Prison Wandsworth.
- John Thomas Wyatt, Foreman Erector, Sir William Arrol & Co., contractors. For services in the construction of the Empire Exhibition, Scotland.
- Thomas Watters, Head Motor Driver, Scottish Ambulance Unit in Spain.
- Edward James Barwell, Senior Orderly, Government House, Wellington, Dominion of New Zealand.
- Arthur Driver, Line Inspector, Engineering Branch, Postmaster-General's Department, Brisbane, State of Queensland.
- James Brierley. Foreman, Inspectorate of Gun Carriages & Vehicles, Indian Ordnance Services, Jubbulpore.
- Nanak Prasad Srivastava, Postmaster General, United Provinces of Agra & Oudh.
- Babu Sarat Chandra Ghose, Forest Ranger, Sitapahar Range, Chittagong Hill Tracts, Bengal.
- Vithaldas Nathabhai Mehta, Head Clerk, Record Branch Office of the Commissioner of Police, Bombay.
- Vasudev Trimbak Mulherkar, Head Clerk, Motor Vehicles Department, Office of the Commissioner of Police, Bombay.
- Babu Prafulla Chandra Sen, Confidential Assistant to the Commissioner, Burdwan Division, Bengal.
- Pandit Jhamman Lai Sharma, Head Clerk of the political Branch of the Central India Agency, Secretariat, Central India Agency, Indore.
- Benjamin Maurice Adderley. For social work among prisoners in British Honduras.
- Joshua Ajayai, DCM, Inspector of Police, Grade II, Nigeria.
- Mohi-El-Din El Asali, Assistant Superintendent, Palestine Police Force.
- Eric Frank Butcher, Assistant Inspector, Palestine Police Force.
- Neville Oscar Callender, Constable, Trinidad Constabulary.
- Frederick George Charlesworth, Constable, Palestine Police Force.
- Albert Edward Conquest, 2nd Sergeant, Palestine Police Force.
- Salvador Basil Daniels, School Teacher, Roman Catholic Elementary School, Barranco British Honduras.
- Hashem Selim Deifeh, Sergeant, Palestine Police Force.
- Yehya Yassin Faris, Detective Constable, Palestine Police Force.
- Hubert James Fulbrook, 1st Sergeant, Palestine Police Force.
- David Misselbrook Morgan, Constable, Palestine Police Force.
- Mohamed Ali El Ousta, Detective Constable, Palestine Police Force.
- Alexander Pringle, 2nd Sergeant, Palestine Police Force.
- Ernest Rainey, Inspector, Aden Police.
- Theophilus Roberts, Sergeant, Trinidad Constabulary.
- Alan Samuel Lyle Smythe, Constable, Palestine Police Force.
- James Sneddon, Acting Sergeant, Palestine Police Force.
- Soloman Noah Soffer, First Inspector, Palestine Police Force.

=== Royal Red Cross (RRC) ===
In recognition of the exceptional devotion and competency displayed by them in the nursing and care of the sick in Royal Air Force: Hospitals at Home and Abroad.

- Matron-in-Chief Emily Mathieson Blair, Princess Mary's Royal Air Force Nursing Service.
- Matron Bessie Cowie Simpson Forsyte, Princess Mary's Royal Air Force Nursing Service.

=== Air Force Cross (AFC) ===
Royal Air Force

- Wing Commander Charles Findlay, DFC.
- Squadron Leader David Neal Roberts.
- Squadron Leader Raymond William Pennington Collings.
- Squadron Leader Alexander Lumsden Franks.
- Flight Lieutenant Maurice James Adam.
- Flying Officer Peter Derek Rougier Hutchings.
- Flying Officer Denys Edgar Gillam.

Reserve of Air Force Officers

- Flight Lieutenant Ralph Patrick Phillip Pope, DFC.

Auxiliary Air Force

- Wing Commander Lord George Nigel Douglas-Hamilton.

Royal Australian Air Force

- Flight Lieutenant William Lloyd Hely.

=== Air Force Medal (AFM) ===
Royal Air Force

- 407258 Flight Sergeant Reginald Edward Kirlew.
- 357087 Flight Sergeant Wilfred Sydney Lake.
- 363767 Flight Sergeant William Christopher Maker.
- 364938 Flight Sergeant Rowland Parr.
- 363261 Flight Sergeant William Edgar Sully.
- 560813 Sergeant Harry Graham Hastings.
- 561877 Sergeant Thomas Pountney.
- 363522 Sergeant Herbert William Waylen.
- 365988 Sergeant John Peter Whitehead.
- 363383 Corporal Gerald Francis Carnell.
- 513935 Corporal David William Edmunds.
- 562133 Leading Aircraftman Arthur Leslie Holland.
