= Lightowler =

Lightowler is a surname. Notable people with the surname include:

- Gerry Lightowler (1940–2008), English footballer
- Miriam Lightowler (1875–1958), English politician

== See also ==
- Marshall Lightowlers, Australian parasitologist
