= Bayldon =

Bayldon is a surname. Notable people with the surname include:

- Arthur Bayldon (1865–1958), English-born Australian poet
- Francis Joseph Bayldon (1872–1948), Australian mariner and nautical instructor
- Geoffrey Bayldon (1924–2017), British actor and cousin of Oliver
- Oliver Bayldon (1938–2019), British production designer and cousin of Geoffrey
