= Elizabeth Britomarte James =

Australian political reformer (1867–1943)

Elizabeth Britomarte James OBE, JP
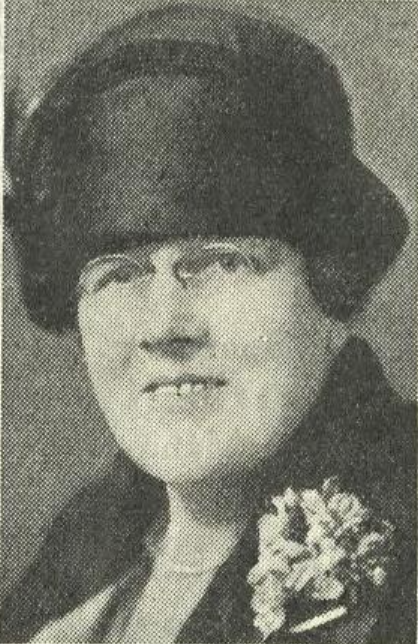
- James in 1927
- Born: 1 June 1867; Durban Lead, Ballarat, Victoria, Australia
- Died: 6 November 1943 (aged 76); Auburn, Victoria, Australia
- Resting place: Springvale Cemetery
- Other names: Mrs Britomarte James
- Known for: Australian political reformer, women's activist and temperance advocate

Elizabeth Britomarte James OBE JP (1 June 1867 – 6 November 1943), also known as Mrs Britomarte James, was an Australian political reformer, women's activist and temperance advocate.

== Early life and marriage ==
Born on the Victorian goldfields at Durban Lead, Ballarat, Victoria, James was the eldest child of Ebenezer James and Clara Elizabeth James (née Maisey). The family moved to Port Melbourne where James assisted her father in his work as chaplain at the Mission to Seaman.

James married her cousin, George Henry James on 25 May 1889 at her parents' home in Port Melbourne. He was a schoolteacher with the Victorian Department of Education.

== War and welfare work ==
Both her sons enlisted in World War I and were injured. James travelled to England to assist their recovery. Subsequently, they enlisted in the Flying Corps and, rather than returning to Australia, she volunteered with the Red Cross. She was later put in charge of a unit of the Women's Army Auxiliary Corps in France.

After the war she formed the Ex-Service Woman's Association and was its president for a number of years. In 1922 she was president of both the Metropolitan branch of the Farmers' Union and the Wattle League. She was also a leading member of the Victorian Women Citizens' Movement and the Victorian branch of the National Council of Women.

James stood unsuccessfully for election to the Council of South Melbourne in 1927.

In 1934, James called a meeting at the Lyceum Club in March 1934 at which she proposed the formation of a Centenary Club, being a place to welcome visitors to Melbourne.

In the 1938 Birthday Honours, James was made an Officer of the Order of British Empire for "social welfare services in the State of Victoria".

== Personal ==
James died at Kareela Private Hospital, Auburn, Victoria on 6 November 1943. She was survived by her two sons, Cecil Holman James and George Ronald James. Her husband had predeceased her in September 1938. She is buried in Springvale Cemetery, Springvale, Victoria.
