= William Stanley Reeve-Tucker =

British planter (1888-1939)

William Stanley Reeve-Tucker CBE
- Born: 1888
- Died: 26 March 1939 (aged 50–51); Whitchurch
- Occupation: Rubber planter
- Years active: 1907-1938
- Spouse: Kathleen
- Children: 1 son and 1 daughter

William Stanley Reeve-Tucker CBE (1888 – 26 March 1939) was a rubber planter in Malaya and a member of the Federal Council.

== Career ==
Eldest son of Major W. R. Reeve-Tucker, officer of the Malay States Guides at Taiping, William Stanley Reeve-Tucker was born in 1888. In 1907, he went to Malaya to work as a rubber planter's assistant on the Sungei Rengam Estate, Batu Tiga. In 1912, he was appointed manager of the Sungei Way Estate, Selangor, and remained as manager of the company until his retirement in 1938.

Reeve-Tucker was a pioneer fighter of Malaria in Malaya who introduced the new systematic oiling method by which oil sprayed on water was found to kill harmful mosquitoes and prevent them from breeding. When he came to the Sungei Way Estate it was reported to be one of the unhealthiest estates but by using the oiling method he reduced the incidence of Malaria amongst the workers to negligible amounts within two years. A staunch supporter of better working conditions for estate workers, he introduced welfare reforms and established a provident fund for their benefit. On several occasions he was President of the United Planting Association of Malaya, and in 1927 was appointed a member of the Central Health Board of the Federated Malay States.

In 1936, he was appointed as member of the Federal Council representing planters in Malaya, and the following year was appointed member of the Selangor State Council, and Justice of the Peace for the State. He was also served on the Sanitary Board.

He was also a keen volunteer, joining the Malay States Volunteer Rifles (MSVR) in 1907, and receiving his commission in 1913. He served with the local forces during the First World War, rose to the rank of captain, and was mentioned in despatches.

He retired to England in 1938 due to ill-health, and died in Whitchurch, in 1939, aged 51. He married in 1912, and had a son and a daughter.

== Honours ==
In 1928, Reeve-Tucker was awarded the Colonial Auxiliary Forces Long Service Medal, and was appointed Commander of the Order of the British Empire (CBE) in the 1938 King's Birthday Honours.
