= Frederick Joseph Morten =

British colonial administrator (1888–1960)

Frederick Joseph Morten CMG
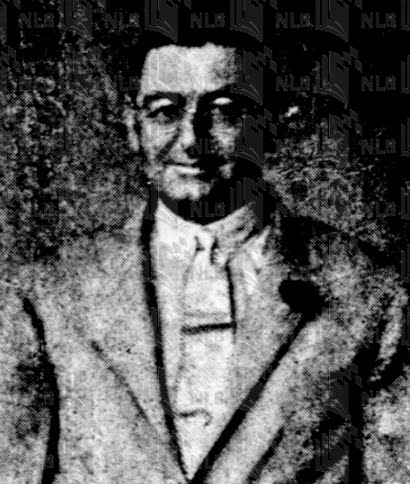
- Born: 6 October 1888
- Died: 18 May 1960 (aged 71)
- Education: Exeter College, Oxford
- Occupation: Colonial administrator

Frederick Joseph Morten (6 October 1888 – 18 May 1960) was a British colonial administrator who was Director of Education of the Straits Settlements and Adviser on Education to the Federated Malay States from 1932 to 1938.

== Early life and education ==
Morten was born on 6 October 1888 the son of Frederick Morten. He was educated at Lancing College and Exeter College, Oxford.

== Career ==
Morten joined the colonial administrative service in 1912 as a cadet in the Straits Settlements, and began his career serving in the Police Courts of Singapore acting as assistant district judge and magistrate. In 1914 he was transferred to Jasin as acting District Officer. After completing his cadetship in 1915 he served as acting District Officer, Alor Gajah. In 1919, he was attached to the Colonial Secretary's office in Singapore. In the following year he was transferred to Malacca where he was assistant to the Resident of Malacca; Agent to the Food Controller, and Collector of Land Revenue. In 1923, he was acting Registrar and Sheriff of the Supreme Court of Penang, and later that year was appointed Assistant Secretary, Straits Settlements and Clerk of the Councils, positions which he held until 1928.

In April 1932, Morten was appointed Director of Education of the Straits Settlements and Adviser on Education to the Federated Malay States taking over from R.O.Winstedt. Regarded as "an administrative appointment" at a time when education was becoming an important part of colonial administration, Morten, like other heads of education in the Colonies at the time, had no experience in education and had received no special training. Appointed during what was described as "the most difficult time that the department of education had passed through" due to the economic slump, Malaya was faced with a large surplus of English educated Malay boys who were unable to find suitable employment which led to criticism of the government. From July 1937 to February 1938, he acted as Colonial Secretary. For many years during the 1930s, he was acting President of Raffles College. He retired in 1938 as Director of Education and was succeeded by William Linehan.

Morten died on 18 May 1960, aged 71.

== Honours ==
Morten was appointed Companion of the Order of St Michael and St George (CMG) in the 1938 Birthday Honours.
