= Marion Knowles =

Australian journalist, poet, writer and Catholic charity worker

Marion Knowles MBE
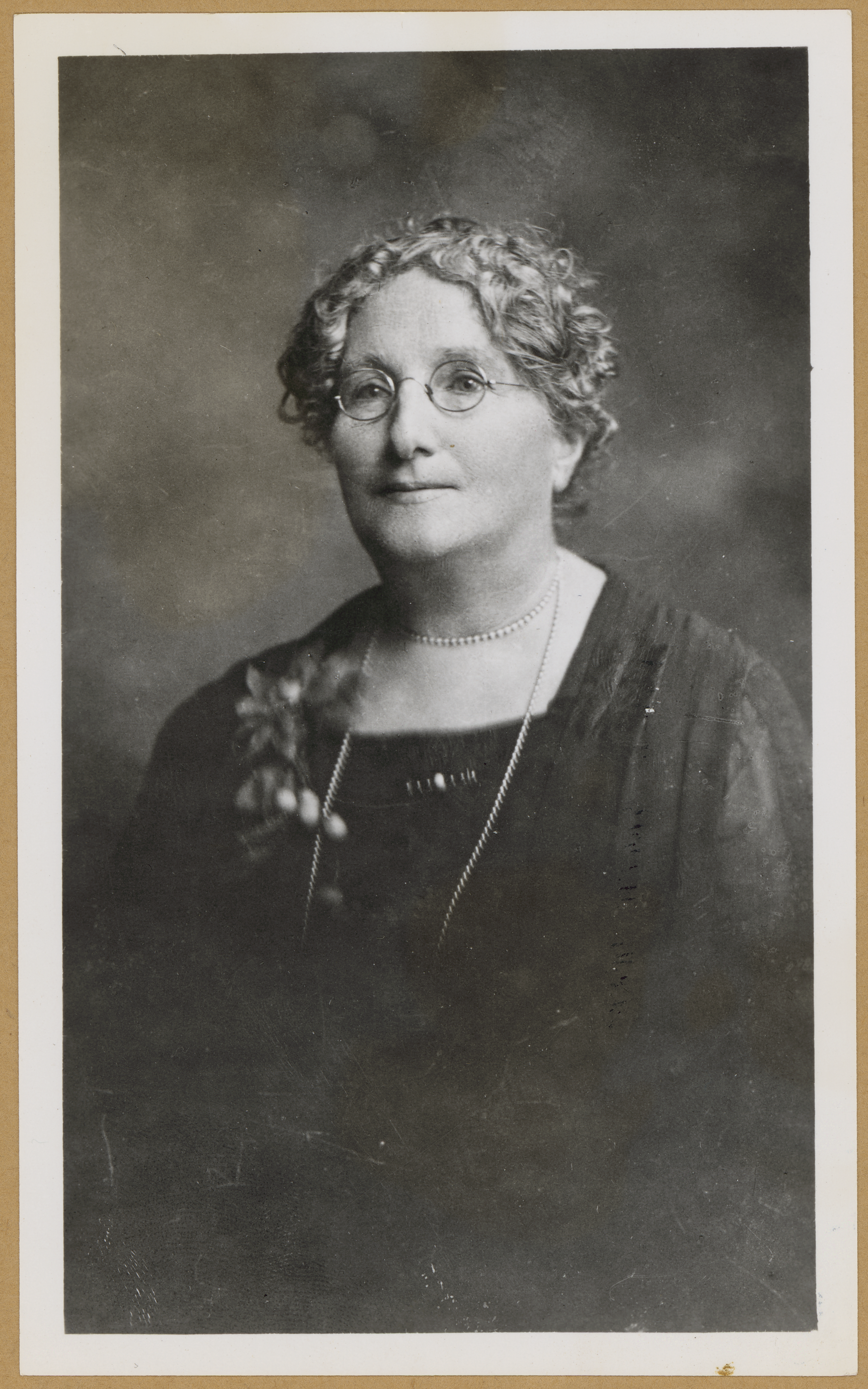
- Born: Marion Miller; 8 August 1865; Woods Point, Victoria, Australia
- Died: 16 September 1949 (aged 84); Camberwell, Victoria, Australia
- Resting place: Brighton Cemetery
- Occupations: Novelist, poet, journalist
- Children: 2 sons
- Writing career
- Pen name: John Desmond, Aunt Patsy

Marion Miller Knowles MBE (1865–1949) was an Australian journalist, poet, writer and Catholic charity worker.

== Early life and education ==
Born on 8 August 1865 in the Victorian gold-mining town of Woods Point, Knowles was the daughter of James and Anne (née Bowen) Miller. Her father was a storekeeper.

== Career ==
She was a journalist for the Melbourne Advocate for 30 years and conducted the Women’s and Children’s pages until her retirement in 1927. She also was a charity worker for the Melbourne Catholic Orphanage and the Wattle Day appeals.

In 1893 her first poems appeared in The Australasian under the name "John Desmond".

In 1931 she received a pension from the Commonwealth Literary Fund.

Knowles was made a Member of the Order of the British Empire in the 1938 Birthday Honours, being recognised as "a well-known Australian writer of books for girls".

== Works ==
=== Novels ===
- Barbara Halliday: A story of the hill country of Victoria (1896)
- Corinne of Corall's Bluff (1912)
- The Little Doctor (1919)
- The House of Garden of Roses (1923)
- Meg of Minadong (1926)
- Pierce O'Grady's Daughter (1928)
- Pretty Nan Hartigan (1928)

=== Poetry ===
- Songs from the Hills (1898)
- Fronds from the Black's Spur (1911)
- Roses on the Window Sill (1913)
- A Christmas Bouquet (1915)
- Shamrock Sprays (1916)
- Songs from the Land of the Wattle (1916)
- Love, Luck and Lavender (1919)
- Christmas Bells (1919)
- Ferns and Fancies (1923)
- Selected Poems (1935), republished in two volumes:
  - The Harp of the Hills (1937)
  - Lyrics of Wind and Wave (1937)

=== Short stories ===
- Shamrock and Wattle Bloom: A series of short tales and sketches (1900)

== Personal ==
Knowles married Joseph Knowles at St Patrick’s Cathedral on 19 September 1901. Her husband died on 18 June 1918 at a private hospital in Melbourne, aged 60.

Knowles died on 16 September 1949 and was survived by her two sons, Adrian and William. Following a requiem mass at the Sacred Heart Church in Kew, she was buried in Brighton Cemetery.
