= Geoffrey Bozman =

English cricketer

Personal information
- Full name: Geoffrey Stephen Bozman
- Born: 26 November 1896; Wandsworth, Surrey, England
- Died: 23 February 1973 (aged 76); Bromley, Kent, England
- Batting: Unknown
- Bowling: Unknown

Domestic team information
- Years: Team
- 1925/26: Europeans

Career statistics
Competition	First-class
Matches	1
Runs scored	24
Batting average	12.00
100s/50s	–/–
Top score	20
Balls bowled	24
Wickets	0
Bowling average	–
5 wickets in innings	–
10 wickets in match	–
Best bowling	–
Catches/stumpings	–/–
- Source: ESPNcricinfo, 29 November 2022

Geoffrey Stephen Bozman CIE CSI (26 November 1896 — 23 February 1973) was an English first-class cricketer and an officer in the Indian Civil Service.

The son of Samuel Bozman, he was born in November 1896 at Wandsworth. He was educated at Whitgift School, before matriculating to Brasenose College, Oxford. Bozman served in the First World War, being commissioned into the Queen's Royal Regiment (West Surrey) as a second lieutenant in October 1915, before being transferred to the Royal Flying Corps as a flying officer in August 1916. He was made a temporary lieutenant in March 1917, before gaining the rank in full in July 1917. Following the war, he was transferred to the unemployed list in January 1919, and resigned his commission in August of the same year, retaining the rank of lieutenant. Bozman joined the Indian Civil Service based in Madras in 1922, becoming an officer in the Department of Education, Health and Lands and eventually rose to the rank of secretary of the department. He was made a Companion to the Order of the Indian Empire in the 1938 Birthday Honours, and was later made a Companion of the Order of the Star of India in the 1946 New Year Honours. While in British India, Bozman played first-class cricket for the Europeans cricket team against the Indians at Madras in the Madras Presidency Match of January 1926. Opening the batting twice in the match, he was dismissed for 20 runs in the Europeans first innings by B. Bhaskar Rao, while in their second innings he was dismissed for 4 runs by C. R. Ganapathy. Bozman retired to England, where he died at Bromley in February 1973.
