= Arthur William Turner =

Australian veterinary scientist and bacteriologist (1900–1989)

Arthur William Turner OBE
- Born: 17 August 1900; Melbourne, Australia
- Died: 20 December 1989 (aged 89); Melbourne, Australia
- Resting place: Springvale Crematorium garden (cremated)
- Spouses: Grace (d. 1982); Nora
- Children: 3
- Awards: Officer of the Order of the British Empire; Gilruth Prize of the Australian Veterinary Association
- Scientific career
- Fields: Veterinary Science; Bacteriology
- Institutions: Melbourne University; CSIRO Division of Animal Health

Arthur William Turner OBE FAA (1900–1989) was an Australian veterinary scientist and bacteriologist.
