= Marshall Lightowlers =

Australian parasitologist

Marshall Lightowlers is an Australian parasitologist. He began his career in the field of parasitology during a post-doctoral appointment at the Institute of Medical and Veterinary Science in Adelaide where he undertook research on ovine sarcocystosis. In 1981, he began a post-doctoral position at the University of Melbourne, Veterinary Clinical Centre and commenced a research career focusing on the immunology and molecular biology of taeniid cestode parasites.

His initial research at the University of Melbourne investigated the immunochemistry of antigens of Taenia taeniaeformis and Echinococcus granulosus. Subsequently he was a member of a team of scientists that developed a vaccine against Taenia ovis infection in sheep, the first recombinant vaccine against a parasitic disease. In 1989 Lightowlers took over leadership of the molecular parasitology research laboratories at the University of Melbourne and began applying the lessons learnt with T. ovis to the development of similar vaccines against infection with the larval stages of other cestode parasites. This led to the development of highly effective, recombinant vaccines against cysticercosis in cattle due to Taenia saginata (TSA9/TSA18) and in pigs due to Taenia solium. In collaboration with Dr David Heath at the Wallaceville Animal Research Centre in New Zealand, he and his colleagues also developed the EG95 recombinant vaccine against cystic echinococcosis (hydatid disease).

The EG95 vaccine was proven successful in experimental trials in sheep against E. granulosus infection carried out in Argentina, China, Romania, Iran, New Zealand and Australia. The vaccine was registered as a commercial product in China in 2007 by Chongqing Auleon Biologicals Co., Ltd., and in Argentina in 2011 by Tecnovax Sanidad Animal. In 2016 the EG95 vaccine was incorporated into the Chinese National Echinococcosis Control Program and National Animal Disease Compulsory Immunization Program.

The TSOL18 vaccine against Taenia solium achieved >99% protection in experimental trials undertaken in pigs in Mexico, Cameroon and Peru. It has been developed as a commercial product, Cysvax, by Indian Immunologicals Limited and registered in India in 2016. The TSOL18 vaccine played an important role in a large-scale, successful, cysticercosis elimination program undertaken in the Tumbes region of northern Peru. The vaccine has completed the clinical trials in Nepal and has shown to be effective to control cysticercosis in pigs of the region.

Marshall Lightowlers is Principal Research Fellow with the National Health and Medical Research Council in Australia and Professor in the Faculty of Veterinary and Agricultural Sciences at the University of Melbourne. In 2011 he was appointed by the University of Melbourne Council as Melbourne Laureate Professor. He has published more than two hundred articles in internationally refereed journals and books. He has been an active member of the Australian Society for Parasitology, serving as the society's President in 1995/6, Honorary Secretary, and as a council member representing Victoria. In 1998, the society awarded Lightowlers the Bancroft-Mackerras Medal in recognition of his outstanding contribution to the science of parasitology.
