= Guy Riley =

British Army general

Major-General Sir Guy Riley KBE CB
- Born: 5 November 1884
- Died: 24 October 1964 (aged 79)
- Military career
- Allegiance: United Kingdom
- Branch: British Army
- Service years: 1906–1943
- Rank: Major-General
- Unit: North Staffordshire Regiment
- Conflicts: First World War, Second World War
- Awards: KBE, CB

Major-General Sir Henry Guy Riley KBE CB (1884–1964) was a senior British Army officer during the Second World War.

== Biography ==
Born on 5 November 1884, Guy Riley was educated at Bedford School. He joined the North Staffordshire Regiment in 1906, served during the First World War, and was mentioned in dispatches twice. He was Paymaster-in-Chief at the War Office between 1937 and 1943.

Major General Sir Guy Riley was invested as a Companion of the Order of the Bath in 1938, and as a Knight Commander of the Order of the British Empire in 1944. He retired from the British Army in 1943 and died on 24 October 1964.
