= Francis Joseph Bayldon =

Master mariner, nautical instructor

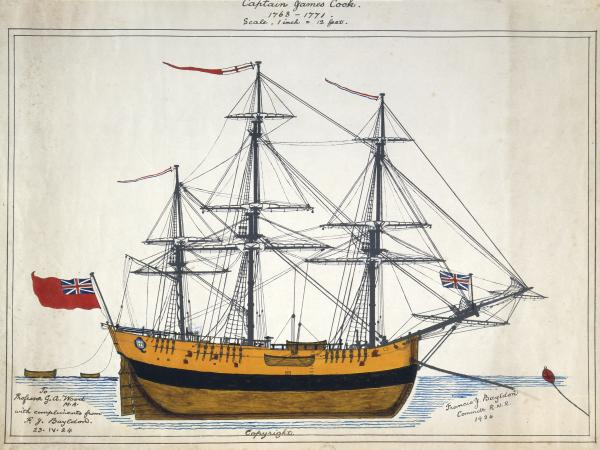
- Dimensional sketch of HM Bark Endeavour by Bayldon, dated 1923
- Born: 23 April 1872; Partney, Lincolnshire, England
- Died: 21 July 1948 (aged 76); Edgecliff, Australia
- Resting place: Bayldon Shoals; 09°08′S 160°08′E
- Other names: Gentle Annie
- Employer: Burns Philp
- Title: M.B.E. 1938
- Spouse: Stella Clare Summerbelle
- Children: Dr. Francis Wood Bayldon
- Parent(s): Rev. Joe Wood Bayldon, Jessie Caroline Nicholls

Francis Joseph Bayldon MBE (1872–1948) was an Australian master mariner and nautical instructor. Born in England, he was apprenticed to Devitt & Moore, and was an officer on their passenger ships, on a route that circled the globe, around the Cape of Good Hope and Cape Horn. He was later with the Canadian-Australian Line, sailing between Vancouver and Sydney, Australia. He was on the Burns Philp ship the Moresby in 1901–1902.

He helped correct nautical charts for Pacific navigation. Bayldon Shoals, near Tulagi in the Solomon Islands, is named for him.

He was a fellow of the Royal Australian Historical Society, and in 1925, published an article on the journeys of Luis Váez de Torres from the New Hebrides to the Moluccas. He was also a fellow of the Royal Geographical Society. He was president of the local League of Ancient Mariners and vice-president of the Shiplovers' Society in Sydney.
