= Miriam Lightowler =

English politician and mayor

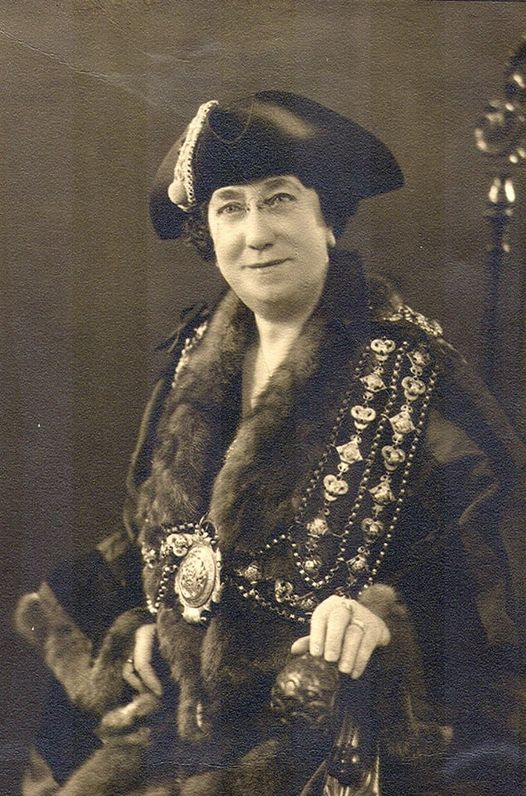
- Mayor of Halifax
- Born: Miriam Butler; 29 June 1875; Halifax
- Died: 19 June 1958 (aged 82); Halifax
- Occupations: councillor and mayor
- Predecessor: Frederick Austin Leach
- Successor: Walter Brenard
- Spouse: Henry Charles Lightowler

Miriam Lightowler JP OBE born Miriam Butler (29 June 1875 – 19 June 1958) was a local politician and mayor of Halifax, West Yorkshire, England. She raised money for a replacement holiday home and she broke a number of firsts including first woman to be mayor or to be a member of Halifax's board of guardians.

== Life ==
Lightowler was born in Halifax in 1875. Her mother was Elizabeth (born Mitchell) and her father, James Ryder Butler. He was the founder of the Butler Machine Tool Company Ltd which employed 500 people. She attended Holy Trinity School and then Cliff House in Harrogate. She was a Methodist all her life and she got her first experience of politics in her churches leaders meeting. Her father was a liberal and her mother was not allowed to vote. In 1896 she married Henry Charles Lightowler who sold carpets and furnished churches.

In 1913 not every man had the vote and no woman did. Women were being allowed to take on some positions and in 1913 she elected as the first conservative woman to serve on the poor-law union board of guardians that met in Halifax's St John's Hospital. Her husband suddenly died in 1918 two weeks after he was appointed to direct the National Kitchens Division (with few qualifications apart from his gender). She and her son became directors of the family company.

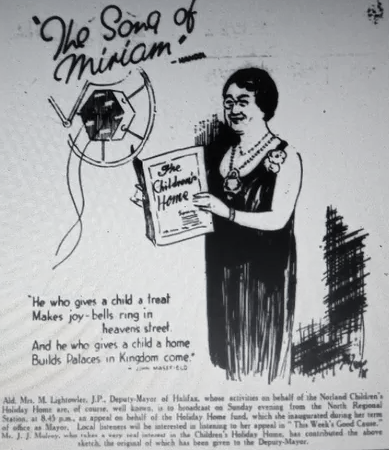
Cartoon of a radio appeal by Deputy Mayor Miriam Lightowler in 1936

In 1928 every woman in Britain was allowed to vote and Lightowler was elected to be the chair of the board of guardians. In the following year she ceremonially started a new clock in motion and the clock was named after her. The guardians became the public assistance committee and she retained the chair. In 1924 she was elected as the only candidate for Halifax's south ward. She was her town's first women councillor. In 1934 she was invited to become Halifax's first woman mayor. Her daughter in law, Edith Mary Lightowler, served as the mayoress and she was called "Mr Mayor". During her year she launched an appeal for Halifax to have a new replacement holiday home for children at Norland. Her appeal broke records when it raised £3,000 in eight weeks. It was assisted by her appeal on BBC radio for the "week's good cause" in Feb 1936 when she was deputy mayor. Her appeal itself was advertised with a cartoon of her in the local paper.

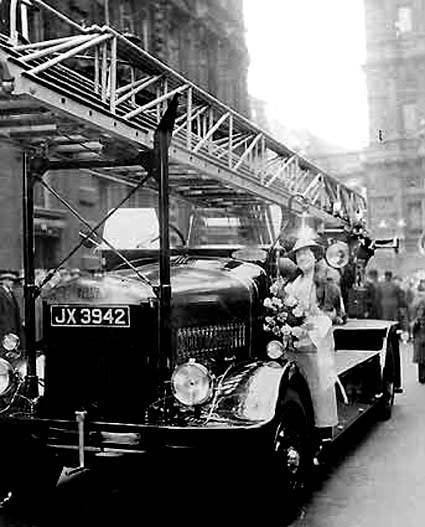
Miriam Lightowler and the turntable ladder that was named for her

In 1935 she had been made an alderman and was given a King George V Silver Jubilee Medal. In 1938 she was given an OBE for her services to Halifax.

Lightowler retired in 1950 and she died in Halifax in 1958. Her funeral was attended by a 100-foot turntable ladder that had been named after her by the local fire service.
