= List of The Tonight Show Starring Johnny Carson episodes (1976) =

- No. of episodes: 246

Release
- Original network: NBC

Season chronology
- ← Previous; 1975 episodes Next → 1977 episodes

The following is a list of episodes of the television series The Tonight Show Starring Johnny Carson which aired in 1976. In October, 1962 Johnny Carson took over as host of the show from the previous host Jack Paar.

== 1976 ==
=== January ===
No.	Original release date	Guest(s)	Musical/entertainment guest(s)
3334	January 1, 1976	TBA	N/A
3335	January 2, 1976	Tony Randall, Ed Bluestone, Irving Fein	Helen Reddy
Desk- "Collective Nouns"
3335	January 5, 1976	Robert Blake (guest host), Jack Palance, George Gobel, Dr. Joyce Brothers, Dub Taylor	N/A
3336	January 6, 1976	Don Rickles, John Byner, Buddy Rich, Cathy Rich	N/A
Carnac the Magnificent
3337	January 7, 1976	Fernando Lamas, Buddy Hackett, Joe Namath, Valerie Perrine, David Horowitz	N/A
Desk- "How to Spot a Married Man"
3338	January 8, 1976	John Wayne, Buck Henry, James Hampton	Phyllis Newman
Desk- "The Nation's Bicentennial Animal"
3339	January 9, 1976	Sammy Davis, Jr., Burt Reynolds, Burt Mustin, Dr. Lendon Smith	N/A
Desk- "Items Being Auctioned from the Lost and Found"
3340	January 12, 1976	Joan Rivers (guest host), Richard Pryor, Alan King	Anthony Newley
3341	January 13, 1976	George Carlin, Norm Crosby, Ed Lauter	Kelly Garrett, Liberace
Desk- "Photos of Johnny's Famous Ancestors"
3342	January 14, 1976	Clement Freud, Elke Sommer, Lionel Stander	Johnny Mathis
Desk- "Prisoners Calendar"
3343	January 15, 1976	Robert Blake, Burt Mustin, Marsha Mason, Marty Liquori	N/A
Desk- "New Television Shows In Development"
3345	January 16, 1976	Doris Day, Rex Reed, Dale Alexander	Donna Theodore ("I've Got the Music in Me")
Mighty Carson Art Players- "Man On The Street Interview"
3346	January 19, 1976	Freddie Prinze (guest host), Bob Hope, Richard Dreyfuss	Tony Orlando
Freddie Prinze's monologue consisted of ethnic jokes.
3347	January 20, 1976	Jonathan Winters, Danny Thomas, Ralph Nader	N/A
Desk- "Astrological Chart for Famous Personalities"
3348	January 21, 1976	Peter Ustinov, John Lindsay, Anne Marie Pohtamo	Judith Blegen
3349	January 22, 1976	Orson Welles, Billy Crystal, Ray Johnson	Lola Falana
Desk- "How to Avoid Household/Bathroom Accidents"
3350	January 23, 1976	Joan Embery, Lee Grant, Myron Cohen	Marilyn Maye
3351	January 26, 1976	David Brenner (guest host)	Mac Davis
3352	January 27, 1976	Della Reese (guest host), James Coco, Jack Albertson	N/A
3353	January 28, 1976	Steve Allen (guest host), Dick Shawn, Andy Kaufman	Charo
Blue Cards (Steve Allen)
3354	January 29, 1976	McLean Stevenson (guest host), Efrem Zimbalist, Jr., Debralee Scott	Bernadette Peters, Rod McKuen
3355	January 30, 1976	McLean Stevenson (guest host), Rich Little, Jack Warden	Jose Molina, Peggy Lee

=== February ===
No.	Original release date	Guest(s)	Musical/entertainment guest(s)
3356	February 2, 1976	McLean Stevenson (guest host), Mickey Rooney, Susan Sarandon	N/A
3357	February 3, 1976	Raymond Burr, Robert Klein, Tom Burnam, Maude Tull	N/A
Desk- "How to Tell When You're About to Lose Your Job"
3358	February 4, 1976	Valerie Harper, Irving Benson, Charles Nelson Reilly	Janis Ian
Johnny and Irv Benson
3359	February 5, 1976	Ginger Rogers, Orson Bean, Chris Sarandon	Ginger Rogers ("They Can't Take That Away From Me"), Pat Boone
Carnac the Magnificent
3360	February 6, 1976	Telly Savalas, Florence Henderson, Slim Pickens, Dr. Joyce Brothers	Florence Henderson ("Keep on Singing" and "Love Will Keep Us Together")
3361	February 9, 1976	John Davidson (guest host)	N/A
3362	February 10, 1976	Bert Convy, Kelly Monteith, Clifton Fadiman	Tom Sullivan
Aunt Blabby
3363	February 11, 1976	Burt Reynolds, Oliver Reed, Larry Beezer, Ward Kimball	Roy Clark
3364	February 12, 1976	Marcel Marceau, Dr. Michael Fox	Anthony Newley, Natalie Cole
Desk- "Predictions for 1976"
3365	February 13, 1976	David Steinberg, Jimmy Connors, Jack Valenti	Dionne Warwick
Stump the Band
3366	February 16, 1976	Smothers Brothers (guest hosts), George Carlin, Don Novello	N/A
Don Novello did a sketch about a mock restaurant with Dick Smothers
3367	February 17, 1976	Dick Cavett, John Davidson, Sue Peterson, Dr. Paul Ehrlich	N/A
3368	February 18, 1976	Joan Rivers, Karen Valentine	Kelly Garrett
Desk- "Codes for Physicians in the Year 1371 and Today's Doctors"
3369	February 19, 1976	Steve Landesberg, Judith Lowry, David Horowitz	Johnny Mathis ("One Day in Your Life")
Floyd R. Turbo- "Editorial in Favor of The SST"
3370	February 20, 1976	George Peppard	N/A
3371	February 23, 1976	McLean Stevenson (guest host), James Coco, Jo Anne Worley, Norm Crosby	N/A
3372	February 24, 1976	Joey Bishop, Freddie Prinze, Ray Johnson	Betty Garrett ("Goofus")
Desk- "Aircraft Pilot Rules in 1920 and 1976"
3373	February 25, 1976	Lynda Carter, Orson Bean, Paul Williams, William Demarest	N/A
3374	February 26, 1976	Peter Falk, Charlie Callas, Theodore Wilson	Della Reese
Desk- "License Plates for Celebrities"
3375	February 27, 1976	Carl Reiner, James Hampton, Ed Bluestone, Dr. Lendon Smith	Gerri Granger
Stump the Band

=== March ===
No.	Original release date	Guest(s)	Musical/entertainment guest(s)
3376	March 1, 1976	Steve Lawrence (guest host), Steve Allen, Wayne Rogers	Janis Ian
3377	March 2, 1976	Charlton Heston, Billy Crystal, Michael Landon, Lisa Farringer	Larry Adler
3378	March 3, 1976	Orson Welles, John Byner, Susan Clark, Sam Blotner	N/A
Desk- "Bicentennial Celebrations"
3379	March 4, 1976	Bob Hope, Don Rickles, Desi Arnaz, Robert Blake	N/A
Mighty Carson Art Players- "Rhinestone Cowboy"
3380	March 5, 1976	Ray Bolger, Marvin Hamlisch, Burt Mustin	Bing Crosby
Carnac the Magnificent
3381	March 8, 1976	Bill Cosby (guest host)	N/A
3382	March 9, 1976	Bill Cosby (guest host)	N/A
Game Show Sketch- "Let's Make a Boo-Boo"
3383	March 10, 1976	Bill Cosby (guest host)	N/A
3384	March 11, 1976	Bill Cosby (guest host)	N/A
3385	March 12, 1976	Bill Cosby (guest host)	N/A
3386	March 15, 1976	McLean Stevenson (guest host)	N/A
3387	March 16, 1976	McLean Stevenson (guest host)	N/A
3388	March 17, 1976	McLean Stevenson (guest host), Steve Martin, Betty White	Mac Davis, Teresa Brewer
3389	March 18, 1976	McLean Stevenson (guest host)	N/A
3390	March 19, 1976	McLean Stevenson (guest host), Bea Arthur	N/A
3391	March 22, 1976	McLean Stevenson (guest host), Minnie Pearl, Kreskin, Adrienne Barbeau	Luciano Pavarotti
3392	March 23, 1976	Joan Embery, Tony Randall, Rodney Dangerfield, Jose Perez	Kelly Garrett
Aunt Blabby
3393	March 24, 1976	Gore Vidal, Stockard Channing, Mark Dawson	Anthony Newley, Hoyt Axton
Desk- "Signs Your Marriage is Breaking Up"
3394	March 25, 1976	Orson Welles, George Gobel, Arthur Ashe	Ray Charles
Floyd R. Turbo- "Editorial in Favor of Censorship"
3395	March 26, 1976	Rodney Dangerfield, Rex Reed, Jean Marsh	N/A
Desk- "Rules for Nurses In The Year 1887 and 1976"
3396	March 29, 1976	David Brenner (guest host), Joan Rivers, Steve Landesberg	Lola Falana
3397	March 30, 1976	Audrey Hepburn, Buddy Hackett, Charlie Callas, Dr. Keith Sehnert	N/A
3398	March 31, 1976	Goldie Hawn, Buck Henry, Ken Fiske	Pat Boone
Desk- "Suggestions from Sylvia Porter's Money Book"

=== April ===
No.	Original release date	Guest(s)	Musical/entertainment guest(s)
3399	April 1, 1976	Rod Steiger, Ellen Burstyn, James Hampton	Loretta Lynn
Desk- "Comments from 13 Year Old Children Regarding their Love Lives
3400	April 2, 1976	Mike Connors, Orson Bean, Carol Wayne	N/A
Desk- "Tours for Senior Citizens"
3401	April 5, 1976	Helen Reddy (guest host), Dinah Shore, Carol Burnett, David Steinberg	N/A
3402	April 6, 1976	Suzanne Pleshette, Louise Fletcher, Dr. Carl Sagan	Bobby Goldsboro
3403	April 7, 1976	Robert Blake, Lee Grant	N/A
Carnac the Magnificent
3404	April 8, 1976	Bruce Dern, Bert Convy, Tom Dreesen, Sally Stanford	N/A
Stump the Band
3405	April 9, 1976	Orson Welles, Debbie Reynolds, Chris Evert	N/A
Desk- "Singles"
3406	April 12, 1976	Orson Welles (guest host), Flip Wilson, Paul Williams, George Gobel	N/A
3407	April 13, 1976	Shelley Winters, John Byner, Dr. Michael Fox	Buddy Rich
Desk- "Presidential Tidbits and Trivia"
3408	April 14, 1976	Charles Nelson Reilly, David Horowitz	Roy Clark, Aretha Franklin
Desk- "Letters from Fifth Grade Students Regarding The Tonight Show"
3409	April 15, 1976	John Davidson, Madlyn Rhue, Dr. William Nolen	Eugene Fodor
Desk- "Symptoms of a TV-aholic"
3410	April 16, 1976	Dom DeLuise, Robert Klein, Adela Rogers St. Johns	Marilyn Horne
3411	April 19, 1976	John Davidson (guest host), Vincent Price, Desi Arnaz	N/A
3412	April 20, 1976	John Davidson (guest host), Bob Hope, Kip Addotta	Shirley Jones
3413	April 21, 1976	John Davidson (guest host), Alfred Hitchcock	N/A
3414	April 22, 1976	John Davidson (guest host)	N/A
3415	April 23, 1976	John Davidson (guest host), Dr. Joyce Brothers	N/A
3416	April 26, 1976	John Davidson (guest host), Rip Taylor, Florence Henderson, Norm Crosby	Freddy Fender
3417	April 27, 1976	Fernando Lamas, Rich Little, Clifton Fadiman	Anna Moffo
Desk- "Precautions During An Earthquake"
3418	April 28, 1976	Don Rickles, Cloris Leachman, Dr. Lendon Smith	Ella Fitzgerald
3419	April 29, 1976	Tony Randall, Freddie Prinze, Joan Van Ark, Burt Mustin	N/A
Carnac the Magnificent
3420	April 30, 1976	Paul Lynde, McLean Stevenson, Bob Uecker, Carol Wayne	N/A
Mighty Carson Art Players- "Tea-Time Movie"

=== May ===
No.	Original release date	Guest(s)	Musical/entertainment guest(s)
3421	May 3, 1976	Don Rickles (guest host), Jack Klugman, James Brolin	Bernadette Peters
3422	May 4, 1976	Gene Kelly, Fred Astaire, John Byner	Tom Sullivan
Desk- "Little Known Facts"
3423	May 5, 1976	Shecky Greene, Thomas Tutko	Ethel Merman ("Gee, But It's Good To Be Here"), Hoyt Axton
Desk- "How to Know a Bore When You Meet One"
3424	May 6, 1976	Orson Bean, David Brenner, Stockard Channing, Ken Fiske	N/A
Stump the Band
3425	May 7, 1976	Orson Welles, Sally Kellerman, Jack Anderson	Bob & Ray
Johnny and Ed Talk
3426	May 10, 1976	Joan Rivers (guest host), Paul Lynde, Desi Arnaz	Jim Nabors
3427	May 11, 1976	Buddy Hackett, Ruth Gordon	Della Reese, Ronny Graham
Aunt Blabby
3428	May 12, 1976	James Stewart, Paul Williams, Buck Henry, Barbara Howar	N/A
Desk- "Citizen Band Radio Codes"
3428	May 13, 1976	Diahann Carroll, Robert Blake, Marvin Hamlisch, Garson Kanin	N/A
Desk- "Hints for Home Shopping"
3429	May 14, 1976	Joan Embery, Charles Nelson Reilly, Susan Clark	Lola Falana
Desk- "Pilots That Didn't Make It"
3430	May 17, 1976	John Davidson (guest host)	Charo
3430	May 18, 1976	Norm Crosby, Joshua Logan	Judith Blegen, Pat Boone
Stump the Band
3431	May 19, 1976	Peter Benchley, George Miller, Leslie Easterbrook	Glen Campbell, Kelly Garrett
Desk- "Rules and Prizes in the Howard Hughes Will Contest"
3432	May 20, 1976	Joey Bishop (guest host), Steve Allen	Fred Travalena
3433	May 21, 1976	McLean Stevenson, Will Geer, David Horowitz	Tom Sullivan
Floyd R. Turbo- "Rebuttal Against Government Control of Medicine"
3434	May 24, 1976	Barbara Walters (guest host), Truman Capote	Neil Sedaka
3435	May 25, 1976	James Hampton, Henny Youngman, Elsa Lanchester	Steve Lawrence
Carnac the Magnificent
3436	May 26, 1976	Jonathan Winters, Ellen Corby, Ed Bluestone, Bud Greenspan	Doc Severinsen & his orchestra perform their rendition of The Bee Gees song "Nights on Broadway".
Desk- "Letters from Third Grade Students Regarding Their Running for President"
3437	May 27, 1976	Fernando Lamas, Sam Blotner	Gloria Loring, Johnny Mathis
Sketch- "King Kong"
3438	May 28, 1976	Taka Miyama, Orson Bean, Max Baer, Jr., Ray Johnson	Bobbie Gentry
3439	May 31, 1976	Michael Landon (guest host), Steve Allen, Shecky Greene, Zero Mostel	N/A
"Show Humorous Film Montage from Little House on The Prairie"

=== June ===
No.	Original release date	Guest(s)	Musical/entertainment guest(s)
3440	June 1, 1976	David Brenner (guest host), Freddie Prinze, Charles Nelson Reilly	Peter Marshall
3441	June 2, 1976	David Brenner (guest host), George Gobel	Natalie Cole
3442	June 3, 1976	Bob Newhart (guest host), Bob Hope, Betty White, Lorne Greene	N/A
3443	June 4, 1976	Bob Newhart (guest host), Rich Little	Anthony Newley
3444	June 7, 1976	Joan Rivers (guest host), James Coco	N/A
3445	June 8, 1976	Joan Rivers (guest host)	Mel Tillis
3446	June 9, 1976	McLean Stevenson (guest host), Sonny Bono, Harvey Korman	Peter Suber
3447	June 10, 1976	McLean Stevenson (guest host), Suzanne Somers, Kreskin	Frankie Avalon
3448	June 11, 1976	McLean Stevenson (guest host), Phyllis Diller, Rip Taylor	Bernadette Peters
3449	June 14, 1976	McLean Stevenson (guest host), Muhammad Ali	Lou Rawls
3450	June 15, 1976	Charlton Heston, Kelly Monteith	Wayne Newton
Johnny and Ed Exchange Stories of Playing a Fair Ground
3451	June 16, 1976	Bert Convy, Steve Landesberg, Dr. Joyce Brothers	Leonard Waxdeck & The Birdcallers, Donna Theodore
Desk- "New Magazine 'Burbank' Articles"
3452	June 17, 1976	Susan Sarandon, John Byner, Jay Robert Nash	Larry Kert
3453	June 18, 1976	Orson Bean, Jack Albertson, Ashley Montagu	Abbe Lane
Desk- "Suggestions on How To Do Your Own Divorce"
3454	June 21, 1976	Freddie Prinze (guest host), Cindy Williams, Richard Pryor	Brett Somers, The Jacksons
3455	June 22, 1976	Lee Marvin, Jim Fowler, Thomas Tutko	Neil Sedaka ("Steppin' Out")
Carnac the Magnificent
3456	June 23, 1976	Tony Randall, Florence Henderson, James Hampton, Dr. William Nolen	N/A
Desk- "Howard Hughes Wills Sent In By Viewers"
3457	June 24, 1976	Rich Little, David Horowitz	Phyllis Newman
Desk- "Descriptions of Jobs Available in Texas"
3458	June 25, 1976	Angie Dickinson, Charles Nelson Reilly	Buddy Rich
Desk- "Strange Laws Still on The Books"
3459	June 28, 1976	John Davidson (guest host), Stan Kann	N/A
3450	June 29, 1976	John Davidson (guest host), Bob Hope, Norm Crosby, Roy Rogers	Vikki Carr
3451	June 30, 1976	John Davidson (guest host), Peter Falk, Kip Addotta, Sandy Duncan	Lennon Sisters

=== July ===
No.	Original release date	Guest(s)	Musical/entertainment guest(s)
3452	July 1, 1976	John Davidson (guest host), George Burns, Adrienne Barbeau, Pat Derby, Marvin Hamlisch	N/A
3453	July 2, 1976	Robert Klein (guest host), Penny Marshall, Rob Reiner	Della Reese
3454	July 5, 1976	Orson Welles (guest host), David Steinberg, Renn Woods, Ted Ross	Betty Garrett
3455	July 6, 1976	Madlyn Rhue, Rodney Dangerfield, Thomas Tutko	Joel Grey
Desk- "Memorabilia of the Centennial in a Safe That Had Been Sealed in 1876 and Opened by President Ford"
3456	July 7, 1976	George Peppard, Charlie Callas, Geoffrey H. Bourne, Charles O. Finley	N/A
Desk- "Psychic Predictions"
3457	July 8, 1976	Gregory Peck, Tom Dreesen	Freda Payne
3458	July 9, 1976	Joan Rivers, Buck Henry, Ralph Keyes	Roger Miller
Stump the Band
3459	July 12, 1976	Beau Bridges	N/A
3460	July 13, 1976	John Davidson	N/A
3461	July 14, 1976	TBA	N/A
3462	July 15, 1976	TBA	N/A
3463	July 16, 1976	Orson Welles, Norman Fell	Eugene Fodor, Lola Falana
Mighty Carson Art Players- "The King And His Fool"
3464	July 19, 1976	Don Rickles (guest host), Monty Hall	Charo
3465	July 20, 1976	John Davidson, Ann Turkel, George Miller, Joshua Logan, Plennie L. Wingo	N/A
3466	July 21, 1976	James Stewart, Karen Black, Steve Martin, Mel Fuller	N/A
Sketch- "The Congressman And His Secretary"
3467	July 22, 1976	David Brenner, Richard Harris, Ray Johnson	Donna Theodore
Sketch- Johnny Was Interviewed by Three Reporters for Getting a '10' Telling a Joke Last Night.
3468	July 23, 1976	Flip Wilson, Pat Boone, Tom Dreesen, Dr. Lendon Smith	N/A
Desk- Johnny impersonates Anne, Princess Royal & her then husband Mark Phillips; "Things You Should Do Once In Your Life"
3469	July 26, 1976	Don Rickles (guest host), Kirk Douglas	Peter Lemongello
3470	July 27, 1976	Charles Nelson Reilly, Dr. Carl Sagan	Tony Bennett
Aunt Blabby
3471	July 28, 1976	Burt Reynolds, Robert Blake, Doris Kearns Goodwin	N/A
3472	July 29, 1976	Mel Brooks, Smothers Brothers, Bob Uecker	N/A
Sketch- "Jim McKay at The Olympics (Johnny portrayed as Jim)"
3473	July 30, 1976	Joan Embery, Bob Newhart, Dr. William Nolen	Marilyn Maye
Sketch- "Howard Cosell at The Olympics (Johnny portrayed as Howard)"

=== August ===
No.	Original release date	Guest(s)	Musical/entertainment guest(s)
3474	August 2, 1976	Roy Clark (guest host)	N/A
3475	August 3, 1976	Roy Clark (guest host)	N/A
3476	August 4, 1976	Roy Clark (guest host)	N/A
3477	August 5, 1976	Joan Rivers (guest host)	N/A
3478	August 6, 1976	Joan Rivers (guest host)	N/A
3479	August 9, 1976	Joey Bishop (guest host), Eva Gabor, Sugar Ray Leonard	N/A
Joey Bishop did a sketch with Pat McCormick
3480	August 10, 1976	Joey Bishop (guest host)	N/A
3481	August 11, 1976	Joey Bishop (guest host)	N/A
3482	August 12, 1976	Joey Bishop (guest host)	N/A
3483	August 13, 1976	Joey Bishop (guest host), Suzanne Somers	N/A
Joey Bishop's last show.
3484	August 16, 1976	Dr. Joyce Brothers, Jean Marsh	N/A
3485	August 17, 1976	Desi Arnaz, Zsa Zsa Gabor	N/A
3486	August 18, 1976	Steve Allen, Norm Crosby	N/A
3487	August 19, 1976	Robert Conrad, Pamela Mason, Arte Johnson and wife Gisela	Gerri Granger
3488	August 20, 1976	David Brenner (guest host), Bert Convy, Beau Bridges	N/A
3489	August 23, 1976	Flip Wilson (guest host), Dick Van Dyke, Avery Schreiber	Dee Dee Bridgewater
3490	August 24, 1976	Flip Wilson (guest host), Franklyn Ajaye	Minnie Riperton, The Spinners
3491	August 25, 1976	Flip Wilson (guest host), Catherine Schell	Liz Torres
3492	August 26, 1976	Flip Wilson (guest host)	N/A
3493	August 27, 1976	Flip Wilson (guest host), Abe Vigoda, Dr. Joyce Brothers, Tom Smothers	Al Green, Shields & Yarnell
3494	August 30, 1976	Shecky Greene (guest host)	N/A
3495	August 31, 1976	Shecky Greene (guest host), Debbie Reynolds, Rich Little, Dub Taylor	Loretta Lynn

=== September ===
No.	Original release date	Guest(s)	Musical/entertainment guest(s)
3496	September 1, 1976	Robert Klein (guest host), McLean Stevenson	Buddy Rich, Rita Moreno
3497	September 2, 1976	David Brenner (guest host)	Robert Goulet
3498	September 3, 1976	David Brenner (guest host), Steve Allen, Ricardo Montalbán	Peggy Lee, Mills Brothers
3499	September 6, 1976	John Davidson (guest host), Sandy Duncan, Norm Crosby	N/A
3500	September 7, 1976	Carl Reiner, Gore Vidal, Roger Owens	N/A
Desk- "List of Wasted Expenditures from Government Grants"
3501	September 8, 1976	Erma Bombeck, Kelly Monteith	Helen Reddy, Hoyt Axton
Carnac the Magnificent
3502	September 9, 1976	Charles Nelson Reilly, Joshua Logan	Eugene Fodor, Johnny Mathis
Desk- "List of Future Projections from Future Facts"
3503	September 10, 1976	Robert Blake, George Gobel, David Horowitz	Priscilla Lopez ("What I Did for Love")
3504	September 13, 1976	Fernando Lamas (guest host)	N/A
3505	September 14, 1976	Bert Convy, Jim Henson	Neil Sedaka
Floyd R. Turbo- "Editorial On The Environment"
3506	September 15, 1976	Valerie Harper, Charlie Callas, Buffalo Bob Smith, Dr. Wayne Dyer	N/A
Desk- "What is 'Macho'?"
3507	September 16, 1976	Tony Randall, George Miller, Stephanie Blackmore, Dr. Carl Sagan	Beverly Sills
Sketch- "Martian Professor"
3508	September 17, 1976	Ralph Nader, David Brenner, Paul Williams	Pamela Blair
Desk- "Fantasy Amusement Park Called Burbankland"
3509	September 20, 1976	Shelley Winters (guest host), Desi Arnaz, Zsa Zsa Gabor	N/A
3510	September 21, 1976	Freddie Prinze, Jan Stephenson, Ray Johnson	Anthony Newley ("Teach the Children")
Sketch- "Defection of a Russian Comedian"
3511	September 22, 1976	Bruce Jenner, John Davidson, Steve Landesberg, Madlyn Rhue	N/A
Desk- "New Television Season and Debates" (Cross-Breeding)
3512	September 23, 1976	Orson Welles, Orson Bean, Carol Lawrence, Kay Lenz	N/A
Aunt Blabby: "Unfair Treatment of The Aged"
3513	September 24, 1976	Diahann Carroll, Fernando Lamas, Ilie Nastase, Norman Fell, Roy Rogers	N/A
3514	September 27, 1976	Shecky Greene (guest host), Steve Allen, Norm Crosby	N/A
3515	September 28, 1976	Danny Thomas, Lee Majors	Shields & Yarnell
Desk- "List of Activities for Senior Citizens"
3516	September 29, 1976	Barbara Parkins, Carol Wayne	Eydie Gormé, Victor Borge
Sketch- "Tea-Time Movie"
3517	September 30, 1976	Shecky Greene, Sam Blotner	Marilyn Horne
Desk- "Popular Cults"

=== October ===
No.	Original release date	Guest(s)	Musical/entertainment guest(s)
3518	October 1, 1976	TBA	N/A
14th Anniversary Show
3519	October 4, 1976	Lola Falana (guest host), Bill Cosby, Orson Bean	Wayne Newton
3520	October 5, 1976	Joan Rivers, James Garner, Dr. Joyce Brothers	Julie Budd ("I'm a Song" and "Weekend in New England")
Carnac the Magnificent
3521	October 6, 1976	Bob Uecker, Dr. William Nolen	Ethel Merman ("What I Did For Love" and "Sweet Georgia Brown"), Abbe Lane
Stump the Band
3522	October 7, 1976	Rod Steiger, Tom Dreesen, June Gable, Barbara Howar	N/A
Desk- "Letters from Seven Year Old Children on Being President of The U.S."
3523	October 8, 1976	Suzanne Pleshette, Raquel Welch, Erma Bombeck	Bob & Ray
3524	October 11, 1976	Rich Little (guest host), Betty White, Lawrence Welk	Scatman Crothers
Desk- "Johnny Carson Mannerisms" (by Rich Little)
3525	October 12, 1976	Rich Little (guest host), Steve Allen, Debbie Reynolds	N/A
Desk- "Comic Graphs" (by Rich Little)
3526	October 13, 1976	Don Rickles (guest host), Carroll O'Connor, Suzanne Somers	Pat Boone
3527	October 14, 1976	David Brenner (guest host), Shelley Winters	Gladys Knight & the Pips
3528	October 15, 1976	David Brenner (guest host), Cleveland Amory	Mel Tillis
3529	October 18, 1976	McLean Stevenson (guest host), James Hampton	Dionne Warwick
3530	October 19, 1976	McLean Stevenson (guest host), Jack Palance, Jim Varney	N/A
3531	October 20, 1976	David Brenner (guest host), Burl Ives	Lou Rawls
3532	October 21, 1976	David Brenner (guest host), Anne Baxter	Hoyt Axton
3533	October 22, 1976	David Brenner (guest host), Stan Kann	Rita Moreno
3534	October 25, 1976	Charles Nelson Reilly (guest host), Robert Conrad	N/A
3535	October 26, 1976	James Stewart	Ed Ames, Lola Falana
Desk- "How to Save Money"
3536	October 27, 1976	Orson Welles, Robert Blake, Dr. Wayne Dyer	Kelly Garrett
Desk- "Lists of Titles of Special Interest Magazines"
3537	October 28, 1976	Bob Hope, Steve Martin, Jim Fowler, David Horowitz	N/A
Aunt Blabby
3538	October 29, 1976	Shelley Winters, Johnny Bench	Gladys Knight and The Pips
Sketch- "Press Conference of Woodrow J. Waffle"

=== November ===
No.	Original release date	Guest(s)	Musical/entertainment guest(s)
3539	November 1, 1976	Joan Rivers (guest host), Shecky Greene	The Graduates
(11/2/76 pre-empted for NBC News election night coverage)
3540	November 3, 1976	Alan King, Harvey Korman, Joseph Wambaugh, Marilyn Sokol	N/A
3541	November 4, 1976	Lee Marvin, Orson Bean, Herbert A. Wagner	Larry Kert
3542	November 5, 1976	Dom DeLuise, Susan Anton, Ashley Montagu	Glen Campbell
3543	November 8, 1976	Steve Allen (guest host), David Brenner, Bill Daily	N/A
Blue Cards (Steve Allen); Sketch- "Eyewitless News"
3544	November 9, 1976	Sean Connery	Johnny Mathis, Judith Blegen
Desk- "What People Really Means When They Speak Cliches"
3545	November 10, 1976	Tony Randall, Ann Turkel, Dr. Michael Meyers	Hoyt Axton
Carnac the Magnificent
3546	November 11, 1976	Bert Convy, John Barracato	Helen Reddy
Stump the Band
3547	November 12, 1976	Frank Sinatra, Don Rickles, David Janssen, Ray Johnson	Frank Sinatra performed ("I Sing the Songs" and "Where or When"), Olivia Newton-John performed ("Every Face Tells a Story" and "Sam")
3548	November 15, 1976	Freddie Prinze (guest host), Paul Williams, Kreskin	Richie Havens
3549	November 16, 1976	Mike Connors, George Miller, Marilyn Sokol, Dr. Geoffrey Bourne	N/A
Desk- "Flashcards to Communicate with Other Drivers"
3550	November 17, 1976	Fernando Lamas, Jeanne Moreau, Jack Wheeler	Pat Boone
Desk- "List of Medieval Manners"
3551	November 18, 1976	Tony Curtis, Sheriff Katherine Crumbley	Shields & Yarnell
Desk- "Soap Operas That Didn't Make It"
3552	November 19, 1976	Elliott Gould, Ruth Gordon, Francesco Scavullo	Donna Theodore, Eugene Fodor
Desk- Johnny Talks about NBC's 50th Anniversary Show and Shows Film of Clips from the show.
3553	November 22, 1976	David Brenner (guest host), Peter Strauss	N/A
3554	November 23, 1976	Jack Klugman (guest host), Carazini	N/A
Blue Cards
3555	November 24, 1976	Don Rickles (guest host), Ricardo Montalbán, Dr. Joyce Brothers	Liberace
3556	November 25, 1976	Joan Rivers (guest host), Vincent Price, Twiggy	Robert Goulet
3557	November 26, 1976	Joan Rivers (guest host), Betty White	Mac Davis
3558	November 29, 1976	David Brenner (guest host), McLean Stevenson, Ted Knight	N/A
3559	November 30, 1976	George Burns, Rodney Dangerfield, Michael Constantine, Shana Alexander	N/A
Desk- "Predictions for President Carter's Term in Office"

=== December ===
No.	Original release date	Guest(s)	Musical/entertainment guest(s)
3560	December 1, 1976	William Holden, John Byner, Jack Anderson	Donna Theodore
Aunt Blabby
3561	December 2, 1976	Orson Welles, Susan Flannery, Mickey Rooney, Pat Henry	Tom Sullivan
Desk- "How To Determine If a Boyfriend is Stingy"
3562	December 3, 1976	Robert Wagner, Natalie Wood, Kelly Monteith, Erma Bombeck, Bill Shoemaker	N/A
Floyd R. Turbo- "Editorial Rebuttal in Favor of Military Draft"
3563	December 6, 1976	Bob Newhart (guest host), Dick Martin, Norm Crosby	Lennon Sisters
3564	December 7, 1976	Orson Bean, Charles Nelson Reilly, Dr. Dixie Lee Ray	Julie Budd
Carnac the Magnificent
3565	December 8, 1976	Charlie Callas, Cyd Charisse, Nancy Dickerson	Tony Martin
Desk- "Do's and Don'ts for Department Store Santa Claus"
3566	December 9, 1976	Rod Steiger, George Gobel, Jessica Lange, Sharon Johansen	N/A
New Products
3566	December 10, 1976	Bob Hope, Charlton Heston, Renn Woods, David Horowitz	N/A
Desk- "List of Ultimate Gifts for Christmas"
3567	December 13, 1976	Bob Newhart (guest host), Don Rickles, Bob Uecker	Anthony Newley
3568	December 14, 1976	John Davidson, Richard Pryor, Darleen Carr, Dr. Michael Fox	John Davidson ("Santa Claus Is Comin' to Town" and "After the Lovin'")
Don Rickles cigarette box incident: Johnny found out his cigarette box has been broken by Don Rickles who is taping CPO Sharkey next door. Johnny takes the camera and goes unexpected into the CPO Sharkey studio during the taping.
3569	December 15, 1976	Michael Landon, Tom Dreesen, Bud Greenspan	Robert Merrill
3570	December 16, 1976	Sylvester Stallone, Steve Landesberg, Dr. Joyce Brothers	Marilyn Maye ("By Myself" and "Being Alive")
Desk- "Letters from Children to Santa Claus"
3571	December 17, 1976	Joan Embery, George Carlin, Marilyn Sokol, Merie Earle	N/A
The NBC Orchestra performs a Christmas medley
3572	December 20, 1976	John Davidson (guest host), Muhammad Ali, McLean Stevenson	N/A
3573	December 21, 1976	John Davidson (guest host)	N/A
3574	December 22, 1976	John Davidson (guest host), David Steinberg	N/A
3575	December 23, 1976	John Davidson (guest host), Cindy Williams, Norm Crosby, Kip Addotta, Cleveland Amory	Kenny Rogers
3576	December 27, 1976	Steve Allen (guest host), Shecky Greene	N/A
Blue Cards (Steve Allen)
3577	December 28, 1976	Suzanne Pleshette, Gabriel Kaplan, Ray Johnson	Donna Theodore
Desk- "Unusual Christmas Cards"
3578	December 29, 1976	James Stewart, Jim Turner, Dr. Lendon Smith	Linda Hopkins
Desk- "What to Do on New Year's Eve"
3579	December 30, 1976	Orson Welles, Norman Fell, Kelly Lange	Engelbert Humperdinck
Desk- "How to Get Rid of a Hangover"
3580	December 31, 1976	Robert Blake, James Hampton, Frank Raines	Lola Falana
Sketch- "New Years' Baby 1977"
