= List of The Tonight Show Starring Johnny Carson episodes (1977) =

Episodes in 1977

- No. of episodes: 261

Release
- Original network: NBC

Season chronology
- ← Previous; 1976 episodes Next → 1978 episodes

The following is a list of episodes of the television series The Tonight Show Starring Johnny Carson which aired in 1977. In October, 1962 Johnny Carson took over as host of the show from the previous host Jack Paar.

== 1977 ==
=== January ===
No.	Original release date	Guest(s)	Musical/entertainment guest(s)
3581	January 3, 1977	David Brenner (guest host)	N/A
3582	January 4, 1977	Bob Hope, Rich Little, Irving Benson, Clement Freud	Richard Fredricks
3583	January 5, 1977	Fernando Lamas, John Byner, Joan Van Ark	Abbe Lane
3584	January 6, 1977	Orson Bean, Richard Benjamin, Joe Namath, Dick Schaap	Dee Dee Bridgewater
Sketch- "An Ombudsman"
3585	January 7, 1977	Peter Strauss, Darleen Carr	Steve Lawrence, Shields & Yarnell
Carnac the Magnificent
3586	January 10, 1977	Steve Lawrence (guest host), Marvin Hamlisch	Connie Stevens
3587	January 11, 1977	David Steinberg, William Demarest	Judith Blegen
3588	January 12, 1977	Ricardo Montalbán, Penny Marshall, Mark Wilson	Buddy Rich, Ronny Graham
3589	January 13, 1977	Peter Finch, George Carlin, Ruth Gordon	Joanie Sommers
Desk- "Gifts 'Not' to Give the Foreign Governments"
3590	January 14, 1977	Bob Hope, Angie Dickinson, Garson Kanin, Renn Woods	N/A
Stump the Band. Johnny acknowledges Peter Finch's death at the end of the program.
3591	January 17, 1977	Joan Rivers (guest host), Nancy Walker, Paul Williams	The Keane Brothers
3592	January 18, 1977	Earl Holliman, Billy Crystal, Charles Nelson Reilly, Merie Earle	N/A
Desk- "New Fall Television Series"
3593	January 19, 1977	Pat Henry, Sam Blotner	Dolly Parton
Aunt Blabby
3594	January 20, 1977	Shelley Winters, Gordon Margulis, James Phelan, Mel Stewart, Victor Buono	Joe Williams
3595	January 21, 1977	Florence Henderson, Andy Kaufman, Peter Isacksen, Dr. William Nolen	N/A
Desk- "Johnny mentioned the KNBC 'Feeling Fine' and the subject 'Growing Old' and added some comedic remarks."
3596	January 24, 1977	David Brenner (guest host), Jimmy Breslin, Sharon Farrell, Vincent Price	The Jacksons
3597	January 25, 1977	David Brenner (guest host)	N/A
3598	January 26, 1977	David Brenner (guest host)	Ben Vereen, Jack Jones
3599	January 27, 1977	Steve Martin (guest host), Tom Smothers, Ricky Jay	John Denver, Nitty Gritty Dirt Band, The Carpenters
Desk- Steve Martin checked in with his phone answering service.
3600	January 28, 1977	McLean Stevenson (guest host), Alan King, Lee Grant, Kreskin	Bob Dylan
3601	January 31, 1977	Don Rickles (guest host), Jack Klugman	N/A
Don Rickles and Ed discuss: The time Don broke Johnny's cigarette box

=== February ===
No.	Original release date	Guest(s)	Musical/entertainment guest(s)
3602	February 1, 1977	Buddy Hackett, Cindy Williams, Sander Vanocur	N/A
Floyd R. Turbo
3603	February 2, 1977	Tony Randall, Paula Prentiss, Alex Haley	Mel Tillis
3604	February 3, 1977	Orson Welles, Dinah Shore, Erma Bombeck	N/A
Stump the Band
3605	February 4, 1977	Richard Thomas	Della Reese
Talk with Ed about his role in the upcoming movie Fun with Dick and Jane
3606	February 7, 1977	Roy Clark (guest host), Elke Sommer, Norm Crosby	Freddy Fender
3607	February 8, 1977	Lily Tomlin, Rodney Dangerfield, Joseph Wambaugh	Jan Peerce
Desk- Johnny talks about the new NBC show called 'Seeds.'
3608	February 9, 1977	Orson Bean, Marilyn Sokol	Pat Boone
Desk- "Horror Movies That Haven't Been Released Yet"
3609	February 10, 1977	Richard Harris, Ann Turkel, Buck Henry, David Horowitz	N/A
Desk- "Suggestions for President Carter"
3610	February 11, 1977	Bert Convy, Shana Alexander, Marie-France Pisier	Lola Falana
Sketch- Johnny did a representation of Lincoln being interviewed on television.
3611	February 14, 1977	Orson Welles (guest host), Carol Burnett, Foster Brooks, Edwin Newman	N/A
Orson Welles performs a cardtrick with Doc Severinsen.
3612	February 15, 1977	George Carlin, McLean Stevenson, Martina Navratilova, Rita Reutter	N/A
Sketch- "Cupid"
3613	February 16, 1977	Thalassa Cruso	Joey Heatherton, Tony Bennett
Desk- "The Code for Comic Book Artists"
3614	February 17, 1977	Charlie Callas, Ray Johnson	Jose Molina, Dolly Parton
Carnac the Magnificent
3615	February 18, 1977	Lawrence Welk, Robert Klein, Mary Welch, Maggie Kuhn	Henry Cuesta
Desk- "Tips on How to Conserve Water"
3616	February 21, 1977	Helen Reddy (guest host), George Burns	Olivia Newton-John
3617	February 22, 1977	Charlton Heston, George Gobel, Ashley Montagu	Kelly Garrett
Sketch- "George Washington"
3618	February 23, 1977	Joan Embery, David Steinberg	Itzhak Perlman
Desk- Johnny mentions his Hasty Pudding Man of the Year award from Harvard University. He then reads some audience questions addressed to President Carter.
3619	February 24, 1977	Shecky Greene (guest host), Paul Williams, Jean Marsh	N/A
3620	February 25, 1977	Della Reese (guest host), Gabriel Kaplan	N/A
3621	February 28, 1977	George Carlin (guest host), Debbie Reynolds, Dr. Joyce Brothers	N/A

=== March ===
No.	Original release date	Guest(s)	Musical/entertainment guest(s)
3625	March 1, 1977	LeVar Burton	Eubie Blake, Tommy Leonetti
3626	March 2, 1977	Burt Reynolds, Jay Leno, Jack Douglas	Diana Ross
Jay Leno makes his first appearance on The Tonight Show Starring Johnny Carson. He would later become a guest host in 1986, and became the permanent host on May 25, 1992.
3627	March 3, 1977	Dyan Cannon, Andy Kaufman, Gore Vidal	Eydie Gormé, Steve Lawrence
3628	March 4, 1977	Peter Strauss, Calvin E. Simmons	Mummenschanz
Desk- "Ways Your Car Can Save Your Life"
3629	March 7, 1977	Steve Allen (guest host), Victor Buono	Linda Hopkins
Blue Cards (Steve Allen)
3630	March 8, 1977	Steve Allen (guest host), Charles Nelson Reilly, Norm Crosby	N/A
Blue Cards (Steve Allen)
3631	March 9, 1977	Joan Rivers (guest host), David Steinberg, Ned Beatty	N/A
3632	March 10, 1977	Alan King (guest host), Vincent Price	Della Reese
3633	March 11, 1977	Gabriel Kaplan (guest host), Penny Marshall, Norman Fell	N/A
3634	March 14, 1977	Bob Newhart (guest host), Bob Uecker, Kreskin	N/A
3635	March 15, 1977	James Stewart, Steve Martin, David Horowitz	Dee Dee Bridgewater
Desk- "Little Known Nominations"; Sketch- Johnny lip-synced a Sinatra record and a woman threw water on his head.
3636	March 16, 1977	William Holden, Kelly Monteith, Dan Haggerty	Mel Tillis
Desk- "Award Winning Commercials"
3637	March 17, 1977	Robert Blake, Alex Karras, Madlyn Rhue	Marilyn Maye
Sketch- "Leprechaun Interview"
3638	March 18, 1977	Angie Dickinson, Norm Crosby, Susie Cottrell	Kelly Garrett
Stump the Band
3639	March 21, 1977	David Brenner (guest host), Shelley Winters, Cleveland Amory	Janis Ian
3640	March 22, 1977	Raymond Burr, Billy Crystal, Mariette Hartley, Merie Earle	Gerri Granger
Desk- "New Congressional Code of Ethics"
3641	March 23, 1977	James Hampton, Richard Reeves	Joel Grey, Lee Horwin
Floyd R. Turbo
3642	March 24, 1977	Bob Hope, Michael Landon, Marilyn Sokol	Kenny Rogers
Mighty Carson Art Players- "Godfather Debate"
3643	March 25, 1977	Mitzi Gaynor, Orson Bean, Dr. Carl Sagan	N/A
Desk - Johnny welcomes the town of Essex, San Bernardino County, California to the show and talks to two of its residents. Essex did not have a TV signal at the time.
3644	March 28, 1977	David Brenner (guest host), Suzanne Somers, Stan Kann	Neil Sedaka, Mary MacGregor
3645	March 29, 1977	Bert Convy, Richard Benjamin, George Miller, Elizabeth Ashley	N/A
Desk- "How to Save New York City"
3646	March 30, 1977	Bruce Dern, Michael Preminger, Fernando Lamas, Dr. Samuel Dunkell	N/A
3647	March 31, 1977	Brenda Vaccaro, George Gobel, Renn Woods, Dr. Edgar Berman	N/A
Carnac the Magnificent

=== April ===
No.	Original release date	Guest(s)	Musical/entertainment guest(s)
3648	April 1, 1977	McLean Stevenson, Tom Dreesen, Ray Johnson	Ethel Merman ("Ridin' High" and "Younger Than Springtime")
Desk- "Wedding Planning"
3649	April 4, 1977	Steve Martin (guest host), Cindy Williams, Betty White	Liberty
Desk- "Test for Audience"
3650	April 5, 1977	Shecky Greene, Robert Klein	Kenny Rogers
Desk- "What To Do If You Were Johnny Carson"
3651	April 6, 1977	Rich Little (guest host), Phyllis Diller, Stan Kann	Joe Williams
Desk- "Rich Little Imitated Seven Presidents Then Henry Kissinger"
3652	April 7, 1977	Charles Nelson Reilly, Buck Henry, Irwin Blye	Lola Falana ("This Magic Moment")
Mighty Carson Art Players- "Tea-Time Movie"
3653	April 8, 1977	Joan Embery, Pat Henry, Carol Wayne	Billy Davis, Jr., Marilyn McCoo
Tea-Time Movie
3654	April 11, 1977	Bob Newhart (guest host), Don Rickles, Alex Karras	N/A
3655	April 12, 1977	Bob Newhart (guest host), Henry Fonda, Jerry Van Dyke	Freddy Fender ("Rain, Rain, Rain")
Desk- "Bob's Trip to Israel"
3656	April 13, 1977	Burt Reynolds (guest host), Orson Welles, Norman Fell	The Keane Brothers
Desk- "Burt's Playing Golf in Mexico"
3657	April 14, 1977	David Brenner (guest host), Bob Hope, Ruth Buzzi, Norm Crosby	England Dan & John Ford Coley ("The Dowdy Ferry Road")
3658	April 15, 1977	Burt Reynolds (guest host), Cher, David Steinberg	Dee Dee Bridgewater
Desk- "Burt's Fishing Vacation"
3659	April 18, 1977	John Davidson (guest host), Sandy Duncan, Harvey Korman	Aretha Franklin
3660	April 19, 1977	John Davidson (guest host), Steve Allen	N/A
3661	April 20, 1977	John Davidson (guest host)	Harry Chapin
3662	April 21, 1977	John Davidson (guest host)	Skiles and Henderson
3663	April 22, 1977	John Davidson (guest host), Earl Holliman, Rip Taylor, Jacques Cousteau	Lou Rawls ("All The Way" and "See You When I Get There")
3664	April 25, 1977	Orson Welles (guest host), Jack Lemmon, George Gobel	N/A
3665	April 26, 1977	Sammy Davis, Jr., Charlie Callas, George Peppard	N/A
Desk- "Lines Men Use to Break Down a Girl"
3666	April 27, 1977	Jill Ireland, David Sayh, Dr. Paul Ehrlich	Steve Lawrence
Carnac the Magnificent
3667	April 28, 1977	Lucille Ball, Jay Leno, Erma Bombeck	Joey Heatherton
Desk- "Suggestions and Questions from Audience for Johnny"
3668	April 29, 1977	Cloris Leachman, Hal Linden, Brooke Hayward	Hoyt Axton
Commercial Blackouts

=== May ===
No.	Original release date	Guest(s)	Musical/entertainment guest(s)
3669	May 2, 1977	Rich Little (guest host)	N/A
3670	May 3, 1977	Michael Landon, George Carlin	Martina Arroyo
Desk- "Emmy Nomination Categories"
3671	May 4, 1977	Chevy Chase, Richard Pryor, Marilyn Sokol, James Hampton	N/A
Aunt Blabby
3672	May 5, 1977	McLean Stevenson, Rodney Dangerfield, Ren Woods, Bob Woolf	N/A
Stump The Band
3673	May 6, 1977	Tony Curtis, John Ritter	N/A
Desk- "California License Plates"
3674	May 9, 1977	George Carlin (guest host), Milton Berle, Sam Levenson	Bernadette Peters
3675	May 10, 1977	David Steinberg, Erica Jong	Lola Falana, Mummenschanz
Floyd R. Turbo
3676	May 11, 1977	Jim Fowler, Shecky Greene	Lana Cantrell
Desk- "How a Person Can Reach Age 100"
3677	May 12, 1977	James Coburn, Ed Herlihy, Bobby Wick	Kelly Garrett
The Tonight Show Band plays "Supreme Sacrifice"
3678	May 13, 1977	Rob Reiner, Dan Haggerty	N/A
Sketch- "Big Foot"
3679	May 16, 1977	Robert Klein (guest host), Penny Marshall	N/A
3680	May 17, 1977	Angie Dickinson	Buddy Rich
Desk- "Shows That Didn't Make It"
3681	May 18, 1977	Red Adair, Orson Bean, David Horowitz	Julie Budd
Carnac the Magnificent
3682	May 19, 1977	Fernando Lamas, Bea Arthur, Irving Benson, Dr. Michael Fox	Joanie Sommers
3683	May 20, 1977	Muhammad Ali, Peter Falk, Steve Landesberg, Dr. Carl Sagan	N/A
3684	May 23, 1977	Steve Martin (guest host)	Helen Reddy
3685	May 24, 1977	Steve Martin (guest host)	N/A
3686	May 25, 1977	Steve Allen (guest host)	N/A
3687	May 26, 1977	Steve Allen (guest host)	N/A
3688	May 27, 1977	Steve Allen (guest host)	N/A
3689	May 30, 1977	David Brenner (guest host)	N/A
3690	May 31, 1977	David Brenner (guest host)	N/A

=== June ===
No.	Original release date	Guest(s)	Musical/entertainment guest(s)
3691	June 1, 1977	David Brenner (guest host), Marvin Hamlisch, Jackie Mason	Della Reese
3692	June 2, 1977	David Brenner (guest host), Edwin Newman	Robert Goulet
3693	June 3, 1977	David Brenner (guest host), Florence Henderson, Tom Smothers	N/A
3694	June 6, 1977	George Carlin (guest host), Elliott Gould, Monty Hall	N/A
3695	June 7, 1977	Suzanne Pleshette, Tom Snyder, Dr. Paul Ehrlich	N/A
Desk- "The Drought"
3696	June 8, 1977	Richard Benjamin, Richard Lewis, Sam Blotner	Gerri Granger
Stump the Band
3697	June 9, 1977	Diahann Carroll, David Sayh, John Schuck, Dan Rather	N/A
Floyd R. Turbo
3698	June 10, 1977	Sammy Davis, Jr.	Shields & Yarnell
3699	June 13, 1977	David Steinberg (guest host), Sally Field, Dr. Joyce Brothers	Helen Reddy
3700	June 14, 1977	Jay Leno, Joseph Wambaugh	Leonard Waxdeck & The Birdcallers, Alice Cooper ("Lace and Whiskey")
Aunt Blabby
3701	June 15, 1977	Charles Nelson Reilly, Peter Benchley	Claire Ritter, Johnny Mathis
Desk- "Body Insurance for Performers"
3702	June 16, 1977	Angie Dickinson	Ethel Merman ("Nothing Can Stop Me Now")
Desk- "Personal Profiles"
3703	June 17, 1977	Igor Cassini, Dr. William Nolen	Larry Kert, Lola Falana
Desk- "Letters from Children Regarding Their Fathers"
3704	June 20, 1977	Bob Newhart (guest host), Yul Brynner, Bert Convy	Bernadette Peters
3705	June 21, 1977	Tony Randall, Tom Dreesen, Merie Earle	Buddy Rich
Desk- "Los Angeles Magazine Suggestions of Free Events"
3706	June 22, 1977	George Carlin, Marcel Marceau	Pete Fountain
Stump the Band
3707	June 23, 1977	Susan Sarandon, Billy Crystal	Della Reese
Desk- "Notice from NBC Bulletin Board"; Desk- "Suggestion Box"
3708	June 24, 1977	Orson Bean, George Miller, Sally Kellerman, David Horowitz	N/A
3709	June 27, 1977	Gabriel Kaplan (guest host), Robert Conrad	England Dan and John Ford Coley
3710	June 28, 1977	Gabriel Kaplan (guest host), Suzanne Somers	N/A
Desk- "Letters to Gabriel Kaplan"
3711	June 29, 1977	Alan King (guest host), Rex Reed	Pat Boone
3712	June 30, 1977	Alan King (guest host), Norman Fell	Ben Vereen
Desk- "Blue Cards"

=== July ===
No.	Original release date	Guest(s)	Musical/entertainment guest(s)
3713	July 1, 1977	Vincent Price (guest host), Debbie Reynolds, Dr. Wayne Dyer	N/A
3714	July 4, 1977	Richard Benjamin (guest host), Charles Nelson Reilly, Marsha Mason, Neil Simon	N/A
Richard Benjamin talked about of doing "Quark" for NBC.
3715	July 5, 1977	Rich Little (guest host), Norm Crosby	Charo
3716	July 6, 1977	Joan Rivers (guest host), Shecky Greene, Kreskin	Glen Campbell
Joan talked about the film "Rabbit Test".
3717	July 7, 1977	Robert Klein (guest host), Jackie Mason	Dionne Warwick
3718	July 8, 1977	Della Reese (guest host), Fernando Lamas	Mel Tormé
3719	July 11, 1977	Rob Reiner (guest host), Lindsay Wagner, Albert Brooks, Harry Shearer, Billy Crystal, Penny Marshall	N/A
3720	July 12, 1977	James Stewart, Tracy Austin, Ray Johnson	Donna Theodore
Desk- "Ed's Injury"
3721	July 13, 1977	Buddy Hackett, Paula Prentiss	Bobby Goldsboro
Carnac the Magnificent
3722	July 14, 1977	Rodney Dangerfield, Elizabeth Ashley, Mr. Wizard	N/A
Desk- "Telephone Answering Machines"
3723	July 15, 1977	Marty Feldman, Bruce Jenner	N/A
Stump the Band
3724	July 18, 1977	Roger Moore (guest host), Vincent Price	N/A
3725	July 19, 1977	Albert Finney, Madeline Kahn, Stephen Schneider	N/A
Desk- "Things to Do Without Television"
3726	July 20, 1977	Joan Rivers, Richard Lewis, Bert Convy, Dr. Michael Fox	N/A
Aunt Blabby
3727	July 21, 1977	Sheriff Katherine Crumbley, Dr. Robin Cook	Mel Tillis
3728	July 22, 1977	Paul Williams, Mary Kay Place	Steve Lawrence
Desk-Johnny read some letters from children in which they finished familiar/famous sayings.
3729	July 25, 1977	David Brenner (guest host), Peter Fonda	Loretta Lynn
3730	July 26, 1977	Steve Martin, Fernando Lamas, Merie Earle	Kenny Rogers
Desk- "Psychic Predictions"
3731	July 27, 1977	Tony Randall, Robert Klein	Monti Rock
Desk- "Photos with Comedic Captions"; Stump the Band
3732	July 28, 1977	Charles Nelson Reilly, Norm Crosby, Evelyn Keyes & Janelle Commissiong	N/A
The Tonight Show Band performs "Lover"
3733	July 29, 1977	Shelley Winters, Jay Leno, Dr. Carl Sagan	Dee Dee Bridgewater
Desk- Johnny talked about English television, then showed some tapes of dogs.

=== August ===
No.	Original release date	Guest(s)	Musical/entertainment guest(s)
3734	August 1, 1977	Bob Newhart (guest host), Betty White, Don Rickles	Marilyn Maye, Skiles and Henderson
3735	August 2, 1977	William Devane	Pete Fountain, Liberace
Desk- "Material from Los Angeles Times"
3736	August 3, 1977	Gregory Peck, Edgar Bergen, George Gobel, Jim Bouton	N/A
3737	August 4, 1977	Joan Embery, Orson Bean, Andy Kaufman	Eugene Fodor
Carnac the Magnificent
3738	August 5, 1977	Rich Little, Richard Pryor, David Sayh, David Horowitz	N/A
Desk- "Russian Etiquette"
3738	August 8, 1977	David Steinberg (guest host), Steve Allen, Suzanne Somers, Dub Taylor	Linda Hopkins
3739	August 9, 1977	Helen Reddy (guest host), Hal Linden, Arnold Schwarzenegger, Dr. Joyce Brothers	N/A
3740	August 10, 1977	Gabriel Kaplan (guest host), Bill Cosby, Bruce Jenner	Harry Chapin
3741	August 11, 1977	Gabriel Kaplan (guest host), Bob Uecker	The Keane Brothers
Stump the Comedian with Gabriel Kaplan
3742	August 12, 1977	Gabriel Kaplan (guest host), Tom Smothers, Susan Saint James	Roy Clark
Desk- "Blue Cards with Gabriel Kaplan"
3743	August 15, 1977	John Davidson (guest host), Bob Hope	Natalie Cole
3744	August 16, 1977	John Davidson (guest host), Eva Gabor	N/A
3745	August 17, 1977	John Davidson (guest host), Monty Hall	N/A
3746	August 18, 1977	John Davidson (guest host), Shelley Winters, Dick Clark	Peter Marshall
3747	August 19, 1977	John Davidson (guest host), Bonnie Franklin, Will Geer, Helen Schneider	Freddy Fender
3748	August 22, 1977	Steve Martin (guest host), Chevy Chase, Jay Leno, Stan Kann	Pat Boone
3749	August 23, 1977	Steve Martin (guest host), Bill Cosby	Larry Gatlin
3750	August 24, 1977	Roy Clark (guest host), Norm Crosby	Jim Nabors, Scatman Crothers
3751	August 25, 1977	Roy Clark (guest host), Flip Wilson, Rue McClanahan, David Huddleston, Ruth Buzzi	Buck Trent, The Oak Ridge Boys
3752	August 26, 1977	Roy Clark (guest host), Victor Buono	Vikki Carr, Kenny Rogers
3753	August 29, 1977	George Carlin (guest host), John Ritter	Bernadette Peters, Jose Feliciano
3754	August 30, 1977	Suzanne Pleshette, Rodney Dangerfield, Norman Fell	Joe Williams
Mighty Carson Art Players- "Marharishi"
3755	August 31, 1977	David Steinberg, Lynn Remisovsky	Hoyt Axton
Carnac the Magnificent

=== September ===
No.	Original release date	Guest(s)	Musical/entertainment guest(s)
3756	September 1, 1977	Lou Brock, Don Rickles, Eli Wallach, Colleen McCullough	N/A
Floyd R. Turbo speaks in favor of the neutron bomb
3757	September 2, 1977	Orson Welles, Paul Williams, Madlyn Rhue, Skip Stephenson	Donna Theodore
Desk- "What Are The Odds?"
3758	September 5, 1977	Steve Allen (guest host), Louis Nye	Eartha Kitt
Desk- "Blue Cards (Steve Allen)"
3759	September 6, 1977	George Carlin	Buddy Rich
Johnny and Ed Discuss: 'Up Against the World' and the Labor Day Weekend.
3760	September 7, 1977	Orson Bean	Jack Jones
Aunt Blabby
3761	September 8, 1977	Dr. Lendon Smith	Joan Baez
Desk- "Ways to Cool Off"
3762	September 9, 1977	John Davidson, Sid Caesar, Imogene Coca	John Davidson ("You're Still the One" and "Don't Let Me Be Lonely Tonight"), Eubie Blake
Stump the Band
3763	September 12, 1977	David Brenner (guest host), Sonny Bono	Robert Goulet
3764	September 13, 1977	Peter Strauss, Jim Henson, Carol Wayne, Dr. Paul Ehrlich	N/A
Mighty Carson Art Players- "Tea-Time Movie"
3765	September 14, 1977	James Garner, Jack Klugman	N/A
Desk- "Article from Esquire"
3766	September 15, 1977	Tim Conway, Elayne Boosler	Johnny Mathis, Ronny Graham
Desk- "'Love is...' Letters"
3767	September 16, 1977	Charlton Heston, McLean Stevenson, David Horowitz	N/A
3768	September 19, 1977	David Brenner (guest host), Andy Griffith	N/A
3769	September 20, 1977	Mike Wallace, Erma Bombeck	Lola Falana
Carnac the Magnificent
3770	September 21, 1977	Tony Randall, Kelly Monteith	Anthony Newley
Johnny played the drums with the band, then the band performs with a regular drummer.
3770	September 22, 1977	James Mason	N/A
Sketch- "Recreation of The Funeral of Victor the Giraffe"; Stump the Band
3771	September 23, 1977	Richard Lewis, Peter Ustinov	Steve Lawrence
3772	September 26, 1977	Sammy Davis, Jr. (guest host), Rip Taylor	N/A
3773	September 27, 1977	Sammy Davis, Jr. (guest host), Arte Johnson	N/A
3774	September 28, 1977	Sammy Davis, Jr. (guest host), Sandy Duncan, Dub Taylor	N/A
3775	September 29, 1977	John Denver (guest host), Carl Reiner, Valerie Harper, Dr. Carl Sagan	N/A

=== October ===
No.	Original release date	Guest(s)	Musical/entertainment guest(s)
3776	October 3, 1977	John Denver (guest host), George Burns, Teri Garr	Kenny Rogers
3777	October 4, 1977	George Carlin (guest host), Suzanne Somers	Linda Hopkins
3778	October 5, 1977	Ann-Margret, Charles Nelson Reilly, Florence Henderson	N/A
3779	October 6, 1977	Jane Fonda, Orson Bean, Skip Stephenson, Dr. Michael Fox	N/A
Desk- Johnny showed stills of personalities and ventured what they'd say if told the world will end in one hour.
3780	October 7, 1977	92-year-old Dodgers fan Anna Marvin	Phyllis Newman, Eugene Fodor
3781	October 10, 1977	Steve Allen (guest host), Jayne Meadows, Dick Clark, Pam Grier	N/A
3782	October 11, 1977	Steve Landesberg	Pat Boone, Pete Fountain
Sketch- "Irv Benson and Johnny"
3783	October 12, 1977	Joan Rivers, Phyllis George, Ray Johnson	Los Indios Tabajaras
Desk- "Excuses for Auto Accidents"-sent in by Joe Vecchio
3784	October 13, 1977	Jim Fowler, Buddy Hackett	Della Reese
Desk- "How to Cut Medical Costs"
3785	October 14, 1977	Robert Blake, Barbara Howar, Lesley Ann Warren	Monti Rock
Desk- "Letters from Students About Bert Lance"
3786	October 17, 1977	Steve Martin (guest host), George Gobel, Kreskin	N/A
3787	October 18, 1977	Steve Martin (guest host), Bernadette Peters	John Sebastian, Scatman Crothers
3788	October 19, 1977	Della Reese (guest host), Charles Nelson Reilly, Arte Johnson, Erik Estrada	N/A
3789	October 20, 1977	Gabriel Kaplan (guest host), Cindy Williams, Don Rickles, Jay Leno	N/A
3790	October 21, 1977	Gabriel Kaplan (guest host), Angie Dickinson, Richard Lewis, Don Meredith	N/A
Stump the Comedian with Gabriel Kaplan
3791	October 24, 1977	Helen Reddy (guest host), Sylvester Stallone, Neil Simon, Cleveland Amory, George Miller	Joe Williams
3792	October 25, 1977	Bert Convy (guest host), Bob Newhart, Norm Crosby	N/A
3793	October 26, 1977	David Steinberg (guest host), Elizabeth Ashley, Edwin Newman	Della Reese
3794	October 27, 1977	Burt Reynolds (guest host), Dom DeLuise, Kareem Abdul-Jabbar, Norman Fell	Connie Stevens, Don Williams
Desk- "Blue Cards for Burt"
3795	October 28, 1977	Tom Smothers (guest host), Steve Allen, Cybill Shepherd, Jackie Mason, Stan Kann	Al Jarreau
3796	October 31, 1977	Bob Newhart (guest host), Harvey Korman, Kelly Monteith, Dr. Joyce Brothers	Pete Fountain

=== November ===
No.	Original release date	Guest(s)	Musical/entertainment guest(s)
3797	November 1, 1977	James Stewart, Rodney Dangerfield, Dr. Robert Jastrow	Anthony Newley
Desk- "Ed's Trip to France"
3798	November 2, 1977	Diahann Carroll, Fernando Lamas, Alan Bursky, Sam Blotner	N/A
Carnac the Magnificent
3799	November 3, 1977	Henry Winkler, Fred Graham, Susan Sullivan	Donna Theodore
Desk- "Words"; Desk- Johnny reads an item concerning him forty years ago from a Nebraska paper.
3800	November 4, 1977	Buck Henry, Susan Ford, David Horowitz	Steve Lawrence
Desk- "You Know You're Going To Get Fired When..."
3801	November 7, 1977	Bob Newhart (guest host), James Hampton	Lola Falana, Luciano Pavarotti
3802	November 8, 1977	Joe Namath	N/A
3803	November 9, 1977	McLean Stevenson, Jean Marsh	Linda Hopkins, Pilobolus
Johnny and Ed Discuss: The New Planet and Ed's bad back.
3804	November 10, 1977	Dinah Shore, Charles Nelson Reilly, Teri Garr, Thalassa Cruso	N/A
Desk- "Worst Song Titles"
3805	November 11, 1977	George Willig, John Byner, Margaret Braswell	Gloria Loring
Stump the Band
3806	November 14, 1977	Frank Sinatra (guest host), George Burns, Angie Dickinson, Carroll O'Connor, Don Rickles	Frank Sinatra performed "Maybe This Time" and "Why Don't You See the Show Again?"
Desk- "Letters"
3807	November 15, 1977	Cloris Leachman, Chris & Charlotte McBride	Judith Blegen
Desk- "Unusual Bumper Stickers"
3809	November 16, 1977	Tony Randall, Jack Douglas and wife Reiko	Charo
Commercial Blackouts
3810	November 17, 1977	Orson Bean, Erma Bombeck, Robert Klein	N/A
Desk- "New Fall Shows"
3811	November 18, 1977	James Caan, Lucille Ball, John Keane - Sherlock Bones "Tracer of Missing Pets"	Phoebe Snow
Sketch- "Take Off About Red Adair"
3812	November 21, 1977	Bob Newhart (guest host), Lily Tomlin, Bob Uecker	Glen Campbell
3813	November 22, 1977	Carl Reiner, Bill Cosby	Kenny Rogers
Desk- "Fashion Rules for Men"
3814	November 23, 1977	Burt Reynolds, Jane Seymour, Fred Brisson	Johnny Mathis
Sketch- "Thanksgiving Turkey Interview"
3815	November 24, 1977	Buddy Hackett, Dick Van Patten, Dr. Lendon Smith	Kelly Garrett ("It's Too Late", "Maybe This Time")
Desk- "Letters from Primary School Students"
3816	November 25, 1977	Karl Malden, David Steinberg	Marilyn Horne
Stump the Band
3817	November 28, 1977	George Carlin (guest host), Rich Little, Dr. Joyce Brothers	N/A
3818	November 29, 1977	Charles Nelson Reilly, Mark Hamill, Dr. William Nolen	Eugene Fodor
Desk- "Football Rules"
3819	November 30, 1977	Professor James Grier, Tom Dreesen	Chuck Mangione, Eydie Gormé
Carnac the Magnificent

=== December ===
No.	Original release date	Guest(s)	Musical/entertainment guest(s)
3820	December 1, 1977	Jack Albertson, Betty White, Gabriel Melgar	Donna Theodore, Eubie Blake
Desk- "Sexual Signals"
3821	December 2, 1977	Elizabeth Ashley, Betty Leslie-Melville	Beverly Sills, Bob & Ray
3822	December 5, 1977	David Brenner (guest host), John Travolta	Frankie Valli
3823	December 6, 1977	David Brenner (guest host), Omar Sharif, Norm Crosby	Mac Davis
David Brenner and Ed Discuss: The City and Country Noises
3824	December 7, 1977	David Brenner (guest host), Teri Garr, Marvin Hamlisch	Frankie Avalon
3825	December 8, 1977	Gabriel Kaplan (guest host), Robert Conrad	Scatman Crothers
3826	December 9, 1977	Gabriel Kaplan (guest host), Steve Allen, Alex Karras, Cleveland Amory	Anne Murray
Stump the Comedian with Gabriel Kaplan
3827	December 12, 1977	Bill Cosby (guest host), Angie Dickinson, Florence Henderson	N/A
Bill Cosby told of receiving some letters about paintings.
3828	December 13, 1977	Joan Embery, Kelly Monteith, Doug Henning	Tony Bennett
3829	December 14, 1977	Charles Nelson Reilly, Lawrence Welk	Dolly Parton
Desk- "Expensive Christmas Gifts"
3830	December 15, 1977	Susan Sullivan	Hoyt Axton
New Products
3831	December 16, 1977	Bob Hope, Robert Blake, Joseph Wambaugh	Mel Tillis
Sketch- "Art Fern"
3832	December 19, 1977	John Davidson (guest host), Debbie Reynolds, Pete Barbutti, Dorothy Hamill	Kenny Rogers
3833	December 20, 1977	John Davidson (guest host), Sandy Duncan, Marilyn Sokol	Harry Chapin
3834	December 21, 1977	John Davidson (guest host), Bruce Jenner, Kreskin	Aretha Franklin
3835	December 22, 1977	John Davidson (guest host), Shelley Winters, Kip Addotta	Bernadette Peters
3836	December 23, 1977	John Davidson (guest host), Victor Buono, Stephanie Edwards	Pat Boone
3837	December 26, 1977	Rich Little (guest host), Kathryn Grant, Shana Alexander	Mel Tormé
3838	December 27, 1977	Richard Benjamin, Alan Bursky, Dr. Lendon Smith	Dizzy Gillespie ("Manteca" and "I Can't Get Started"), Jane Olivor
Pie Blackouts: "Christmas Pie-In-A-Face Blackout"
3839	December 28, 1977	Vincent Price, Bert Convy, Renn Woods, Harriett Iden	N/A
Sketch- "Carswell Predicts"
3840	December 29, 1977	Quinn Cummings, George Miller, Ray Johnson	Al Jarreau
Desk- "Where to Go on New Year's Eve"
3841	December 30, 1977	Suzanne Pleshette, Beau Bridges, Merie Earle	Peggy Lee
Sketch- "Father Time"
