= List of The Tonight Show Starring Johnny Carson episodes (1975) =

Episodes in 1975

- No. of episodes: 254

Release
- Original network: NBC

Season chronology
- ← Previous; 1974 episodes Next → 1976 episodes

The following is a list of episodes of the television series The Tonight Show Starring Johnny Carson which aired in 1975. In October, 1962 Johnny Carson took over as host of the show from the previous host Jack Paar.

== 1975 ==
=== January ===
No.	Original release date	Guest(s)	Musical/entertainment guest(s)
3080	January 1, 1975	Joan Embery, Foster Brooks, Victor Buono, Adela Rogers St. Johns	N/A
Sketch- "New Year's Baby 1975"
3081	January 2, 1975	Diahann Carroll, John Byner, Fernando Lamas	Ronny Graham
Carnac the Magnificent
3082	January 3, 1975	George Peppard, Freddie Prinze, Dr. Carlfred Broderick	Leslie Uggams ("I Get the Blues When It Rains", "Make It Easy On Yourself", "All In Love Is Fair")
Desk- "NFL Film Clips"
3083	January 6, 1975	Dom DeLuise (guest host), Arte Johnson, Carol Lawrence	N/A
3084	January 7, 1975	Tony Randall, John Davidson, Marsha Mason, Buck Henry	N/A
Desk- "Bad News Products"
3085	January 8, 1975	Shecky Greene, George Gobel, Karen Black, David Hapgood	N/A
Desk- "Bathroom Etiquette"
3086	January 9, 1975	Joan Rivers, Allen Garfield, Thalassa Cruso	Joe Williams
Stump the Band
3087	January 10, 1975	Sammy Davis, Jr., Carl Reiner, Elia Kazan	Lana Cantrell
Desk- "Space Junk"
3088	January 13, 1975	Rich Little (guest host), Vincent Price, Sandy Duncan, Jack Klugman	N/A
3089	January 14, 1975	Sammy Davis, Jr., Alex Karras	Liberace
Desk- "Dealing with the Recession"
3090	January 15, 1975	David Janssen, Bert Convy, Jimmy Wynn, Rosie Black	Ethel Merman
Desk- "Unusual Holidays"
3091	January 16, 1975	Robert Blake, Paul Williams, Ellen Burstyn, Otto Preminger	N/A
Desk- "New Television Program Ideas"
3092	January 17, 1975	Don Rickles, Alan King, Eydie Gormé	Monti Rock
Desk- "Ripley's Believe It or Not"
3093	January 20, 1975	John Davidson (guest host), Norm Crosby, Dick Smothers, Amazing Kreskin	Nancy Wilson
3094	January 21, 1975	Orson Bean, Norman Fell, Burt Mustin	Marilyn Horne
Desk- "Economic Forecast for 1975"
3095	January 22, 1975	Ann-Margret, Bruce Dern, Art Carney	Ann-Margret performed ("I've Got the Music in Me")
Carnac the Magnificent
3096	January 23, 1975	James Caan, Karen Valentine, David Brenner, Dr. Michael Fox	N/A
Mighty Carson Art Players- "Great Moments in History"
3097	January 24, 1975	Joan Rivers, Richard Harris, Susan Flannery	Eloise Laws
Desk- "International Road Signs"
3098	January 27, 1975	McLean Stevenson (guest host), Shecky Greene, Victoria Principal	N/A
3099	January 28, 1975	McLean Stevenson (guest host), Steve Allen, Vincent Price, Suzanne Somers	N/A
3100	January 29, 1975	McLean Stevenson (guest host), Sonny Bono, Dub Taylor	N/A
3101	January 30, 1975	McLean Stevenson (guest host), Dinah Shore, Adlai Stevenson, Jr., Jack Albertson	Aretha Franklin
3102	January 31, 1975	McLean Stevenson (guest host), George Gobel	Anthony Newley

=== February ===
No.	Original release date	Guest(s)	Musical/entertainment guest(s)
3103	February 3, 1975	Barbara Walters (guest host), Gene Kelly	Helen Reddy
3104	February 4, 1975	Fernando Lamas, Susan Sarandon, Ken McFeely	Roger Miller
Desk- "Announcements Commemorating the Bicentennial"
3105	February 5, 1975	Charlton Heston, Florence Henderson, Peter Benchley, Dwight Stones	N/A
Desk- "T.V. Guide Show Synopses"
3106	February 6, 1975	Orson Bean, George Carlin, Allen Garfield	Ian Whitcomb
Desk- "How the Federal Budget Should Be Allocated"
3107	February 7, 1975	Henry Fonda, Truman Capote, Senta Berger	Chita Rivera
Desk- "Story of 7 Foot Couple"
3108	February 10, 1975	Roy Clark (guest host), Bob Hope	Glen Campbell
3109	February 11, 1975	Roy Rogers, Buddy Hackett, Pam Grier	N/A
Mighty Carson Art Players- "Roy Rogers And His Sidekick"
3110	February 12, 1975	Angie Dickinson, Robert Klein, Madalyn Murray O'Hair	Marilyn Maye
Stump the Band
3111	February 13, 1975	Mel Brooks, Susan Blakely, Bob Rosefsky	N/A
Desk- "Rights of Shoppers"
3112	February 14, 1975	Jack Palance, John Byner	Today's Children and Now Generation Brass
Sketch- "Cupid"
3113	February 17, 1975	Bill Cosby (guest host), Gabriel Kaplan, Valerie Perrine, Dub Taylor, Adrienne Barbeau	Teresa Brewer
3114	February 18, 1975	Madlyn Rhue, William Demarest	Jack Jones, Petula Clark
Aunt Blabby
3115	February 19, 1975	James Stewart, Kelly Monteith	Buddy Rich
Desk- "Tips for Buying Used Cars"
3116	February 20, 1975	Lily Tomlin, Walter Slezak, Jerry Van Dyke, Sam Blotner	N/A
Carnac the Magnificent
3117	February 21, 1975	George Segal, David Brenner, Dr. Charles Kelman	Los Indios Tabajaras
Desk- "List of Reasons to Get Out of The Service"
3118	February 24, 1975	McLean Stevenson (guest host)	Mel Tormé
3119	February 25, 1975	McLean Stevenson (guest host), Dick Smothers, Jo Anne Worley, Fernando Lamas	Marilyn Horne
3120	February 26, 1975	McLean Stevenson (guest host), Andy Griffith, Kip Addotta, Sandy Duncan	N/A
3121	February 27, 1975	McLean Stevenson (guest host), Marcel Marceau	N/A
3122	February 28, 1975	McLean Stevenson (guest host)	David & Goliath, Pat Boone

=== March ===
No.	Original release date	Guest(s)	Musical/entertainment guest(s)
3123	March 3, 1975	McLean Stevenson (guest host), Bob Hope, Rich Little	N/A
3124	March 4, 1975	McLean Stevenson (guest host)	N/A
3125	March 5, 1975	McLean Stevenson (guest host)	N/A
3126	March 6, 1975	McLean Stevenson (guest host)	N/A
3127	March 7, 1975	McLean Stevenson (guest host)	N/A
3128	March 10, 1975	Shecky Greene (guest host)	N/A
3129	March 11, 1975	Dom DeLuise, John Davidson, Gena Rowlands, Dr. David Viscott	N/A
Desk- "How to Cope With The Recession"
3130	March 12, 1975	Elizabeth Ashley, Bert Convy, Jim Davidson, Charles Quick	Gloria Loring
3131	March 13, 1975	Ronald Reagan, Florence Henderson, Don Meredith	Mickey Newbury
Desk- "Ways the Government Gives Grants"
3132	March 14, 1975	Joan Embery, Michael Landon, John Newcombe	Olivia Newton-John ("Have You Never Been Mellow?")
3133	March 17, 1975	Peter Bogdanovich (guest host), Albert Brooks, Cybill Shepherd	N/A
3134	March 18, 1975	Diahann Carroll, Jim Henson, Dan Rowan, Larry Beezer, Norman Fell	N/A
Sketch- "Professor Fringe- Expert on Origins"
3135	March 19, 1975	Peter Falk, Susan Blakely, Buck Henry	Mac Davis
Desk- "Ideas About The Month of March"
3136	March 20, 1975	Warren Beatty, Gabriel Kaplan	Judith Blegen
Mighty Carson Art Players skit
3137	March 21, 1975	Mitzi Gaynor, Jack Albertson, Linda Pope, Paul Williams	Scatman Crothers
Desk- "Things to Say to Lose Friends"
3138	March 24, 1975	Smothers Brothers (guest hosts), Sally Kellerman	Cliff DeYoung
3139	March 25, 1975	Goldie Hawn, Orson Bean	Johnny Mathis
Carnac the Magnificent
3140	March 26, 1975	Alan Alda, David Brenner, Dr. William Nolen	Ethel Merman
Mighty Carson Art Players- "The Old Vaudevillians"
3141	March 27, 1975	Jonathan Winters, Carmel Myers	Phyllis McGuire
Desk- "Famous First Facts"; Stump the Band
3142	March 28, 1975	Jack Palance, Joan Rivers, Jill St. John	Linda Hopkins
Desk- "Letters from Newleyweds in Pocono Mountains, Pennsylvania"
3143	March 31, 1975	Glen Campbell (guest host), McLean Stevenson, Shecky Greene	Tennessee Ernie Ford, Helen Reddy

=== April ===
No.	Original release date	Guest(s)	Musical/entertainment guest(s)
3144	April 1, 1975	Bob Newhart, Shirley MacLaine	Itzhak Perlman, Ronny Graham
Desk- "Pranks on April Fools' Day"
3145	April 2, 1975	John Davidson, Robert Blake, Freddie Prinze	N/A
Desk- "How to Get Old and Get It Right"
3146	April 3, 1975	Rex Reed, Bob Uecker	Lola Falana, Ronny Graham
Mighty Carson Art Players- "Presidential Press Conference in 1986"
3147	April 4, 1975	Joey Bishop (guest host), Art Carney, Steve Martin, Dr. Michael Fox	Connie Stevens
Desk- "Blue Cards"; Band Number
3148	April 7, 1975	McLean Stevenson (guest host), Steve Allen	N/A
3149	April 9, 1975	McLean Stevenson (guest host), Dick Shawn	N/A
3150	April 10, 1975	Rich Little (guest host), Edward Asner, Karen Valentine	Anthony Newley
3151	April 11, 1975	Rich Little (guest host)	Pat Boone
3152	April 14, 1975	Joey Bishop (guest host)	N/A
3153	April 15, 1975	Joey Bishop (guest host), George Foreman, Bob Hope	N/A
3154	April 16, 1975	Joey Bishop (guest host), Dr. Joyce Brothers, Bert Convy, Margot Kidder	N/A
3155	April 17, 1975	Joey Bishop (guest host), Norm Crosby, Leonard Barr, Adrienne Barbeau	Enzo Stuarti, Mel Tormé
3156	April 18, 1975	Joey Bishop (guest host), David Brenner	Charo
3157	April 21, 1975	Shecky Greene (guest host)	N/A
3158	April 22, 1975	Bea Arthur, January Jones, David Horowitz	Buddy Rich
Carnac the Magnificent
3159	April 23, 1975	Orson Bean, Fernando Lamas	Judith Blegen, Scatman Crothers
Desk- "Television Awards For The Worst Shows"
3160	April 24, 1975	Earl Holliman, Dr. Carl Sagan	Phyllis Newman
Sketch- "Whooping Crane Interview"
3161	April 25, 1975	Ricardo Montalbán, Carol Wayne	Della Reese, Vic Damone
Mighty Carson Art Players- "Tea-Time Movie"
3162	April 28, 1975	McLean Stevenson (guest host), Carazini, Sharon Farrell, Barry Newman, Cleveland Amory, Ted Ross	Stephanie Mills
3163	April 29, 1975	Angie Dickinson, Harvey Korman, Irving Benson, Art Seidenbaum	Pat Boone
Comedy with Irv Benson
3164	April 30, 1975	Robert Blake, Susan Sarandon	Eubie Blake, Joan Baez
New Set Debut & Aunt Blabby

=== May ===
No.	Original release date	Guest(s)	Musical/entertainment guest(s)
3165	May 1, 1975	Elizabeth Ashley, Buck Henry	Lola Falana, Mickey Newbury
3166	May 2, 1975	George Peppard, Paul Williams, Richard Harris, Ann Turkel, Dr. David Viscott	N/A
3167	May 5, 1975	Roger Miller (guest host), Karen Black, John Byner	N/A
3168	May 6, 1975	Michael Landon, Shecky Greene, Maude Tull, Ida Gleason	Luciano Pavarotti
3169	May 7, 1975	Art Carney, Rich Little, Peter Leeds, John C. McAdams	Linda Hopkins
Sketch- "Gangster at Unemployment Office"
3170	May 8, 1975	Dennis Weaver, Charles Nelson Reilly, Dr. Joyce Brothers	Albert Hammond
Desk- "Police Codes"
3170	May 9, 1975	George Gobel, David Brenner	N/A
Carnac the Magnificent
3171	May 12, 1975	Tennessee Ernie Ford (guest host), Lloyd Bridges, Foster Brooks, Shari Lewis	Mel Tillis
3172	May 13, 1975	McLean Stevenson	N/A
Desk- "News That Didn't Happen"
3173	May 14, 1975	Candice Bergen, Dr. Paul Ehrlich	Robert Goulet
Mighty Carson Art Players- "America's First Comic"
3174	May 15, 1975	Don Rickles, Suzanne Pleshette, Allen Garfield	Melba Moore
Stump the Band
3175	May 16, 1975	Bert Convy, Maureen Stapleton	Tom Sullivan, Bob & Ray
Mighty Carson Art Players- "Six O'Clock Fairyland News"; Note: Bert Convy filled in for Ed McMahon.
3176	May 19, 1975	Della Reese (guest host), Sandy Duncan, Carroll O'Connor, Dr. David Reuben, Kip Addotta	Peggy Lee
3177	May 20, 1975	Joan Rivers, Truman Capote, Bob Speca	N/A
Desk- "Little Known Awards"
3178	May 21, 1975	Tony Randall, Steve Landesberg	N/A
Commercial parodies of 'Milk'; Desk- "Little Known Holidays"
3179	May 22, 1975	Buddy Hackett, Madlyn Rhue, Jim Dale	Johnny Mathis
Commercial Blackout: Takeoff of 'Ring-Around-The-Collar'
3180	May 23, 1975	Orson Bean, Charlie Callas	Vikki Carr
Commercial Blackout: Takeoff of 'Diarrhea'; Desk- "Possible Gossip Items for Hollywood Rumor Magazines"
3181	May 26, 1975	Kirk Douglas (guest host), George Segal, Brenda Vaccaro, Bruce Dern	N/A
3182	May 27, 1975	Cloris Leachman, Fernando Lamas, Robert Klein	Scatman Crothers
Commercial Blackouts: Takeoffs of: 'Elliott Janeway', 'Milk', 'Ring-Around-The-Collar', and 'Diarrhea'
3183	May 28, 1975	Shecky Greene, Sally Kellerman, Dr. Joyce Brothers	Itzhak Perlman
Desk- "Causes of Headaches"
3184	May 29, 1975	Robert Blake, Jimmy Breslin, Elke Sommer	Captain & Tennille
Sketch- "Allistair Cookie"
3185	May 30, 1975	Diane Keaton, Myron Cohen	N/A
Desk- "Weird Laws Proposed in Arizona"; Stump the Band

=== June ===
No.	Original release date	Guest(s)	Musical/entertainment guest(s)
3186	June 2, 1975	McLean Stevenson (guest host), Sonny Bono, Dick Shawn	Shirley Jones
3187	June 3, 1975	Leo Durocher, Valerie Perrine	Eydie Gormé
Carnac the Magnificent
3188	June 4, 1975	Bert Convy, Billy Braver, Helen Lawrenson, Dian Thomas	Lola Falana
Desk- Johnny reads a 'Dear Abby' letter
3189	June 5, 1975	Gabriel Kaplan, Bob Uecker, Carol Wayne	Phyllis Newman
Mighty Carson Art Players- "Tea-Time Movie"
3190	June 6, 1975	Joan Embery, Marvin Hamlisch, Susan Flannery	Roger Miller
Sketch- "Summer Camp Counselor"
3191	June 9, 1975	John Davidson (guest host), Rich Little	N/A
3192	June 10, 1975	John Davidson (guest host), Rip Taylor	The Clowns of Ping Pong
3193	June 11, 1975	John Davidson (guest host), Sandy Duncan, Norm Crosby, Kreskin	Robert Goulet
3194	June 12, 1975	John Davidson (guest host), Kip Addotta	Charo, Ethel Merman
3195	June 13, 1975	John Davidson (guest host), Joan Rivers, Robert Shaw	Della Reese
3196	June 17, 1975	Jerry Lewis (guest host)	The Pointer Sisters
3197	June 18, 1975	Jerry Lewis (guest host), Adrienne Barbeau, Dub Taylor, George Maharis	Monti Rock, Scatman Crothers
3198	June 19, 1975	Jerry Lewis (guest host), Sally Struthers	N/A
3199	June 20, 1975	Jerry Lewis (guest host)	Kaye Ballard
3200	June 23, 1975	Jerry Lewis (guest host), Steve Martin, Suzanne Somers, Telly Savalas, Dub Taylor	Leslie Uggams
3201	June 24, 1975	Orson Bean, Brenda Vaccaro, David Horowitz	Kenny Rankin
Desk- "Little Known Laws"
3202	June 25, 1975	Buddy Hackett, William Demarest, Jack Douglas	Minnie Riperton
Carnac the Magnificent
3203	June 26, 1975	David Brenner, Oria Douglas-Hamilton	Joan Baez
3204	June 27, 1975	Earl Holliman, Euell Gibbons, Nanette Fabray	Della Reese
Desk- Johnny reads article from the Detroit Free Press; Note: Excerpts of this episode are featured in the Columbo episode "Forgotten Lady" which originally aired on September 14, 1975.
3205	June 30, 1975	McLean Stevenson (guest host), Steve Allen, Elke Sommer, Wina Sturgeon, Jim Rinehart	Holly Lipton

=== July ===
No.	Original release date	Guest(s)	Musical/entertainment guest(s)
3206	July 1, 1975	Fernando Lamas, Stockard Channing, Buck Henry	Gladys Knight & The Pips
Aunt Blabby
3207	July 2, 1975	Bert Convy (guest host), Don Adams	N/A
3208	July 3, 1975	George Carlin, Geoffrey Holder, Dr. Joyce Brothers	Mac Davis
3209	July 4, 1975	Charles Nelson Reilly, Ricardo Montalbán	Lola Falana,
Desk- "Famous Quotes"; Mighty Carson Art Players- "Liberty Bell"
3210	July 7, 1975	John Davidson (guest host), Jo Anne Worley, George Gobel	Peter Marshall
3211	July 8, 1975	Bert Convy, Sally Kellerman, Jimmy Grippo	Antonia Brico
3212	July 9, 1975	Rex Reed, Pat McCormick	Beverly Sills
Sketch- "Jaws"
3213	July 10, 1975	Robert Blake, Debbie Reynolds, Victor Buono	N/A
Desk- "Sleeping Tips"
3214	July 11, 1975	Red Skelton, Florence Henderson, Rex Reed	N/A
Desk- "T.V. Guide Program Descriptions"
3215	July 14, 1975	George Segal (guest host), Bob Hope, Elliott Gould, Goldie Hawn, Sonny Bono, Cher	Scatman Crothers
Desk- George Segal showed some clips from his film 'Russian Roulette'
3216	July 15, 1975	Dyan Cannon, Sid Caesar	Tom Sullivan
Desk- "Photos of Celebrities When They Were Young"
3217	July 16, 1975	Jack Palance, Norm Crosby, Vonetta McGee	Roy Clark
Desk- "Excuses Motorists Give Police"
3218	July 17, 1975	Charlie Callas, Dr. Michael Fox	Glen Campbell, Marilyn Maye
Stump the Band
3219	July 18, 1975	Allen Garfield, Barbara Carrera, Marvin Hamlisch	Lola Falana
Desk- "How to Avoid Shark Attacks"
3220	July 21, 1975	Joey Bishop (guest host)	Charo
Audience Talent Contest
3221	July 22, 1975	Orson Bean, Freddie Prinze, Mary Jo Peppler	Judi Pulver ("Dancing on the Moon")
Desk- "Little Known Predictions"
3222	July 23, 1975	Joan Embery, Robert Klein, Peter Cook, Dudley Moore	William Walker
Sketch- "NBC Peacock"
3223	July 24, 1975	Joan Rivers, David Brenner, Buck Henry	Peggy Lee
Desk- "Guinness Book of Records"
3224	July 25, 1975	David Janssen, Jim Henson, Ray Johnson	Helen Reddy
Desk- "Comments From Honeymooners"
3225	July 29, 1975	John Denver (guest host), Buddy Hackett, Adrienne Barbeau, Dub Taylor, Karen Black	N/A
3226	July 30, 1975	John Denver (guest host), Smothers Brothers	Glen Campbell, Claudine Longet
3227	July 31, 1975	McLean Stevenson (guest host)	Della Reese

=== August ===
No.	Original release date	Guest(s)	Musical/entertainment guest(s)
3228	August 1, 1975	McLean Stevenson (guest host), Rip Taylor, Quincy Jones	Pat Boone
3229	August 4, 1975	Rich Little	Ben Vereen
3230	August 5, 1975	Bob Newhart (guest host), Suzanne Pleshette, Dick Martin	Petula Clark
Band Number
3231	August 6, 1975	John Davidson (guest host), Karen Valentine, George Foreman, Euell Gibbons, Ernest Borgnine	N/A
3232	August 7, 1975	Don Meredith (guest host), Burt Reynolds	Freddy Fender ("Wasted Days" and "Before the Next Tear Drop Falls")
3233	August 11, 1975	John Davidson (guest host), McLean Stevenson, David Brenner	Lennon Sisters
3234	August 12, 1975	John Davidson (guest host), Dick Clark, Marsha Mason	N/A
3235	August 13, 1975	John Davidson (guest host), Rose Marie, Kip Addotta	Lou Rawls
3236	August 14, 1975	John Davidson (guest host), Steve Landesberg	Della Reese, Neil Sedaka
3237	August 15, 1975	Steve Allen (guest host), Jayne Meadows, Fernando Lamas, Dub Taylor	N/A
Desk- "Blue Cards (Steve Allen)"
3238	August 18, 1975	Joey Bishop (guest host), Betty White	Mel Tormé
3239	August 19, 1975	Joey Bishop (guest host), Ruth Buzzi, James Whitmore, Stan Kann	Skiles and Henderson, Linda Hopkins
3240	August 20, 1975	Joey Bishop (guest host), Alan King, Cleveland Amory	Rod McKuen
3241	August 21, 1975	Joey Bishop (guest host), Suzanne Somers, Victor Buono	Bobby Goldsboro
3242	August 22, 1975	Joey Bishop (guest host), Bob Hope, Carl Gottlieb	Scatman Crothers
3243	August 25, 1975	Bill Cosby (guest host), Dub Taylor	John Twomey, Jose Molina, Martina Arroyo
3244	August 26, 1975	Bill Cosby (guest host), Dr. Lendon Smith	Lola Falana, Mac Davis
Bill Cosby and Ed McMahon performs comic bicycle sketch; Sketch- Tribute to Song Writers Who Just Missed Writing Hits ('White Thanksgiving', 'Bo Johnson' and 'Bad Boy Leroy Johnson')
3245	August 27, 1975	Bill Cosby (guest host), Freddie Prinze, Phyllis Diller, Russell Wayne Howell, Burt Mustin	Judy Collins, Isaac Hayes
With group perform comic mock ballet.
3246	August 28, 1975	McLean Stevenson (guest host), Lee Grant, Dr. Michael Fox	N/A
Desk- "Do's and Don'ts for Labor Day Weekend"; Desk- "Notes on Fanny Patting"
3247	August 29, 1975	McLean Stevenson (guest host), Redd Foxx	Ethel Merman ("I Get a Kick Out of You")

=== September ===
No.	Original release date	Guest(s)	Musical/entertainment guest(s)
3248	September 1, 1975	Michael Landon (guest host), Earl Holliman, Dr. Joyce Brothers	N/A
Michael Landon shows a clip from an episode of "Little House on The Prairie" he wrote.
3249	September 2, 1975	George Burns, Rich Little, Buck Henry	The Bee Gees ("Jive Talkin'")
Desk- "Discussion about Johnny's Vacation"
3250	September 3, 1975	George Peppard, Charlie Callas, Norman Fell	Mills Brothers
Desk- "Pilots That Didn't Make It"
3251	September 4, 1975	Robert Blake, Gabriel Kaplan, Paul Williams, Trish Stewart	N/A
Stump the Band
3252	September 5, 1975	Bert Convy, Rodney Dangerfield, Shelley Winters	N/A
3253	September 8, 1975	Dom DeLuise (guest host)	N/A
3254	September 9, 1975	Dom DeLuise, Joan Collins, Jack Anderson	Harry Chapin
Desk- "Strange Burbank Criminal Acts"
3255	September 10, 1975	Carl Reiner, Jean Marsh, Sally Quinn	Pat Boone
Carnac the Magnificent
3256	September 11, 1975	Angie Dickinson, Orson Bean, Florence Henderson, David Horowitz	N/A
3257	September 12, 1975	McLean Stevenson, Lee Remick, Myron Cohen, Carol Lawrence, Ray Johnson	N/A
3258	September 15, 1975	David Brenner (guest host), Freddie Prinze, Charles Nelson Reilly	Lola Falana
3259	September 16, 1975	Buddy Hackett, Bo Hopkins, Dr. Carl Sagan	N/A
Desk- "Little Known Laws"
3260	September 17, 1975	Joan Rivers, Harvey Korman, Lesley Ann Warren	Paul Anka
Desk- "New Rules for the Television Family Hour"
3261	September 18, 1975	Jack Palance, Arthur Ashe, Jerzy Kosinski	Tom Sullivan
Desk- "Superstitions"
3262	September 19, 1975	Robert Blake, Peter Leeds	N/A
Mighty Carson Art Players- "Columbo" (with Peter Leeds & Robert Blake)
3263	September 22, 1975	Debbie Reynolds (guest host)	N/A
3264	September 23, 1975	Fernando Lamas, Lynn Redgrave, Kelly Monteith	Glen Campbell ("Rhinestone Cowboy", "Marie"), The Supremes
Desk- "Specials Scheduled for The Television Season"
3265	September 24, 1975	David Steinberg, Lee Grant, Michael Korda	Janis Ian
Desk- "Famous Quotes"
3266	September 25, 1975	Earl Holliman, Peter Leeds, William Demarest, Gloria Loring	Luciano Pavarotti, Scatman Crothers
Mighty Carson Art Players- "Monsters At Unemployment Office" (with Peter Leeds)
3267	September 26, 1975	Shelley Winters, Oliver Reed, Dr. Ronald Taylor	Charles Aznavour
3268	September 29, 1975	Dom DeLuise (guest host), Sandy Duncan, Don Adams	N/A
Dom shows slides from his latest film (No Title)
3269	September 30, 1975	Robert Blake, Steve Martin, January Jones, Dr. William Nolen	N/A
Desk- "Survival In The City"

=== October ===
No.	Original release date	Guest(s)	Musical/entertainment guest(s)
3270	October 1, 1975	none	N/A
13th Anniversary Show
3271	October 2, 1975	Tony Randall, Bob Uecker, William F. Buckley, Jr.	Andy Kim
3272	October 3, 1975	Tony Curtis, Elaine Stritch	Diana Ross sang "Theme from Mahogany (Do You Know Where You're Going To)" and "Baby Love"
Desk- "Public Enemies"
3273	October 6, 1975	Joey Bishop (guest host), Deborah Kerr, Norm Crosby, Dr. Joyce Brothers	Freddy Fender
3274	October 7, 1975	Joey Bishop (guest host), Danny Thomas, London Lee, Andy Griffith	N/A
Joey Bishop shows some comedic film clips
3275	October 8, 1975	Joey Bishop (guest host)	Robert Goulet
3276	October 9, 1975	Joey Bishop (guest host)	N/A
3277	October 10, 1975	Joey Bishop (guest host), Ricardo Montalbán, Susan Sarandon	Peggy Lee
3278	October 13, 1975	Don Rickles (guest host), Carroll O'Connor	N/A
3279	October 14, 1975	Don Rickles (guest host), Jonathan Winters	N/A
3280	October 15, 1975	Don Rickles (guest host), John Wayne, Adrienne Barbeau, Bob Hope	Bing Crosby, Pat Boone
3281	October 16, 1975	Don Rickles (guest host)	Scatman Crothers
Don jokes with the band and insults the audience
3282	October 17, 1975	Don Rickles (guest host), Ernest Borgnine	Charo
3283	October 20, 1975	Robert Goulet (guest host), Phyllis Diller	N/A
3284	October 21, 1975	Shecky Greene, Michael Landon	N/A
3285	October 22, 1975	none	N/A
3286	October 23, 1975	Richard Benjamin, Albert Brooks	N/A
Ed wishes Johnny a Happy Birthday
3287	October 24, 1975	Candice Bergen, David Niven	Los Indios Tabajaras
Desk- "How To Save New York City"
3288	October 27, 1975	Fred Astaire, Trish Stewart, Ray Johnson	Bill Evans, Tony Bennett
Desk- "Current Television Shows"
3289	October 28, 1975	Robert Blake, Kelly Monteith, Thomas Braden, Albert Weber	N/A
Aunt Blabby
3290	October 29, 1975	McLean Stevenson, Truman Capote	Lana Cantrell
Desk- "What The Bicentennial Means To You (Letters by 10-Year-Old Children from Ava, Montana)"
3291	October 30, 1975	Lee Grant, Bert Convy, Jay Presson Allen, Charles Nelson Reilly	N/A
Carnac the Magnificent
3292	October 31, 1975	James Coco, Rich Little, David Horowitz	Joe Williams
Desk- "Scandal Fan Magazine's Deceptive Article Titles"

=== November ===
No.	Original release date	Guest(s)	Musical/entertainment guest(s)
3293	November 3, 1975	Della Reese (guest host), Muhammad Ali, Orson Bean	Captain & Tennille ("You Are So Beautiful")
3294	November 4, 1975	Joan Rivers, Paul Williams, Valerie Perrine, Joseph Wambaugh	N/A
3295	November 5, 1975	David Brenner, Garson Kanin	Anthony Newley
Desk- "Facts About The Common Cold"
3296	November 6, 1975	Steve Allen, Jack Palance, Madlyn Rhue	Buddy Rich
3297	November 7, 1975	Gene Kelly, Shecky Greene, Stockard Channing	Ronny Graham
Stump the Band
3298	November 10, 1975	John Davidson (guest host), Suzanne Somers	Peter Marshall
3299	November 11, 1975	Joan Embery, Orson Bean, Charlie Callas, Lynda Carter	N/A
3300	November 12, 1975	George Carlin, Fernando Lamas, Irving Benson, Beth Jaffe	Albert Hammond
Johnny and Irv Benson
3301	November 13, 1975	Earl Holliman, John Davidson, James Hampton	Beverly Sills
3302	November 14, 1975	George Peppard, Jane Goodall	Petula Clark, Bob & Ray
Desk- "Phobias"
3303	November 17, 1975	McLean Stevenson (guest host)	N/A
3304	November 18, 1975	Suzanne Pleshette, Don Rickles	Vic Damone
Desk- "Fan Mail"
3305	November 19, 1975	Ann-Margret, Freddie Prinze, McLean Stevenson, Mr. Wizard	Ann-Margret ("Steppin' Out"), Bobby Goldsboro ("With Pen in Hand")
Desk- "Leaks in Washington, D.C."
3306	November 20, 1975	Buddy Hackett	Roy Clark, Steve Lawrence ("Our Love Is Here To Stay")
Floyd R. Turbo- "Editorial for Hunting"
3307	November 21, 1975	Vincent Price	Eydie Gormé
Desk- "Thanksgiving Dinner (Letters from Children Who Describe the Event)"
3308	November 24, 1975	McLean Stevenson (guest host)	Alice Cooper
3309	November 25, 1975	McLean Stevenson (guest host), Susan Sarandon	Neil Sedaka
Desk- "Suggestions for the Oil Crisis"
3310	November 26, 1975	McLean Stevenson (guest host), Richard Benjamin, Paula Prentiss	N/A
Desk- "How to Stuff Your Thanksgiving Bird"
3311	November 27, 1975	McLean Stevenson (guest host), Fernando Lamas, Charles Nelson Reilly, Dick Shawn	Anne Murray
3312	November 28, 1975	McLean Stevenson (guest host), Steve Allen, George Gobel	N/A

=== December ===
No.	Original release date	Guest(s)	Musical/entertainment guest(s)
3313	December 1, 1975	Roy Clark (guest host), Angie Dickinson, Andy Griffith, Norm Crosby	N/A
3314	December 2, 1975	Lucille Ball, Sam Blotner	Johnny Mathis
Desk- "City of Burbank's Calendar of 1975 and What's in Store for 1976"
3315	December 3, 1975	David Janssen, Lily Tomlin, Irwin Shaw	Natalie Cole ("Inseparable")
Carnac the Magnificent; Irving Paul Lazar makes a brief appearance to offer Johnny a check for $1 million to appear in the film adaptation of Irwin Shaw's "Night Work".
3316	December 4, 1975	Tony Randall, Diane Keaton, John Byner	N/A
Stump the Band
3317	December 5, 1975	Michael Caine, Sean Connery, David Brenner, Burt Mustin	N/A
Gallagher makes his unscheduled debut promoting "The Tonight Show Home Game".
3318	December 8, 1975	Glen Campbell (guest host)	N/A
3319	December 9, 1975	Carol Burnett, Bert Convy, Tom Dreesen, Barbara Gelb	N/A
Desk- "Television Shows That Didn't Make It"
3320	December 10, 1975	George Carlin, Charles Durning, Darryl Ponicsan	Pat Boone
Sketch- "Maharishi"
3321	December 11, 1975	Jack Lemmon, David Steinberg, Madeline Kahn	Kenny Rankin
Desk- "Letters to Santa Claus (Provided by the New York Post Office)"
3322	December 12, 1975	Bob Hope, Dean Martin, Charles Nelson Reilly, Carol Wayne	N/A
Sketch- "Tea-Time Movie"
3323	December 15, 1975	Burt Reynolds (guest host), Gene Hackman, Mel Brooks, Lauren Hutton	Liza Minnelli ("Lucky Lady" and "I Don't Want to Be Lonely Tonight")
3324	December 16, 1975	Shecky Greene, Ted Knight, Madlyn Rhue	Ethel Merman ("Some People")
Desk- "Do's and Don'ts for People Who Play Santa Claus"
3325	December 17, 1975	Charlie Callas, Jean Marsh	Roger Miller, Ronny Graham
Stump the Band
3326	December 18, 1975	Steve Allen, Lorraine Gary	Betty Garrett
New Products
3326	December 19, 1975	Robert Blake, Rodney Dangerfield	Lola Falana
Desk- "Little Known Facts about Christmas"
3327	December 22, 1975	John Davidson (guest host), Norm Crosby, Doug Henning	Robert Goulet
3328	December 23, 1975	John Davidson (guest host), Florence Henderson, Bill Fellows, Victor Buono	Lennon Sisters
3329	December 25, 1975	John Davidson (guest host), Anthony Newley, Vincent Price	Captain & Tennille ("Christmas Is For Children")
3330	December 26, 1975	John Davidson (guest host), Juliet Prowse, Richard Thomas, Rip Taylor, Rose Marie	Kenny Rogers
3331	December 29, 1975	John Davidson (guest host), Kreskin	Charo ("Tequila"), Freddy Fender ("Once I Had a Secret Love" and "Via Con Dios")
3332	December 30, 1975	Buddy Hackett	N/A
Desk- "New Year's Resolutions by Famous People"
3333	December 31, 1975	Joan Rivers, Orson Bean, Charles Nelson Reilly, Scatman Crothers	N/A
Sketch- "Father Time"
