= The Night That Made America Famous =

1975 musical revue featuring the songs of Harry Chapin

- Original Broadway Playbill
- Music: Harry Chapin
- Lyrics: Harry Chapin
- Basis: The songs of Harry Chapin
- Premiere: February 26, 1975
- Productions: 1975 Broadway

The Night That Made America Famous is a 1975 musical revue featuring the songs of Harry Chapin. The music consists of a combination of songs written for the musical and songs from Chapin's four previous albums, the latter including "What Made America Famous?", a song about a plumber who rescues a group of hippies from a fire. A lyric from that song gives the musical its title.

Chapin appeared in the mixed–media musical, alongside a cast that included his brothers, Tom and Stephen, who were both featured performers and musicians. The production was directed by Gene Frankel. Originally scheduled to open February 4, 1975, it opened at the Ethel Barrymore Theatre in New York on February 26, 1975, after fourteen previews, and closed on April 5, 1975 after 47 performances.

== Cast ==
- Alexandra Borrie
- Harry Chapin
- Stephen Chapin
- Tom Chapin
- Mercedes Ellington
- Kelly Garrett
- Delores Hall
- Sid Marshall
- Gilbert Price
- Ernie Pyshe
- Bill Starr
- Lynne Thigpen

== Awards and nominations ==
=== 1975 Tony Award nominations ===
- Tony Award for Best Featured Actor in a Musical - Gilbert Price
- Tony Award for Best Featured Actress in a Musical - Kelly Garrett

=== 1975 Drama Desk Award nominations ===
- Drama Desk Award for Outstanding Featured Actor in a Musical - Gilbert Price
- Drama Desk Award for Outstanding Featured Actress in a Musical - Kelly Garrett
