= David Viscott =

American physician

- Born: David Steven Viscott; May 24, 1938; Boston, Massachusetts, U.S.
- Died: October 10, 1996 (aged 58); Studio City, California, U.S.
- Education: Dartmouth College; Tufts University School of Medicine
- Occupations: Psychiatrist, author
- Spouses: Judith Ann Finn (m. 1959; div. 1976); Katherine Random (m. 1983)
- Children: 4

David Steven Viscott (May 24, 1938 – October 10, 1996) was an American psychiatrist, author, businessman, and media personality. He was a graduate of Dartmouth (1959), Tufts Medical School and taught at University Hospital in Boston. He started a private practice in psychiatry in 1968 and later moved to Los Angeles in 1979 where he was a professor of psychiatry at UCLA. He founded and managed the Viscott Center for Natural Therapy in Beverly Hills, Newport Beach and Pasadena, California.

== Biography ==
In 1980 Viscott began presenting his own full-time show on talk radio, and was notably one of the first psychiatrists to do so (talk station KABC). He screened telephone calls and gave a considerable amount of free psychological counselling to his on-air "patients."

In 1987 Viscott briefly had his own live syndicated TV show, Getting in Touch with Dr. David Viscott, providing much the same service as his radio show. In fact, the shows ran concurrently. In the early 1990s he had a weekly call-in therapy television program on KNBC in Los Angeles early Sunday morning after Saturday Night Live, titled Night Talk with Dr. David Viscott.

Viscott's signature style was to attempt to isolate an individual's source of emotional problems in a very short amount of time. Many of his books were of a self-help nature, written to assist the individual with his own examination of life. His autobiography, The Making of a Psychiatrist, was a best-seller, a Book of the Month Club Main Selection, and nominated for the Pulitzer Prize.

Along with psychiatric advice, he would fall back on his medical knowledge to regularly devote entire segments of radio to answering medical questions. During these segments he would give medical advice. Many of the questions answered had to do with pharmacological advice. This was unique in the world of talk radio.

Viscott's popularity peaked in the early 1990s, and then fell sharply. A separation from his wife, followed by declining health, occurred at about the same time that he left the air waves. He died in 1996 of heart failure complicated by a diabetic condition. At the time, he was living alone in Los Angeles. He is survived by three of his four children: Elizabeth, Penelope, and Jonathan.

== The Simpsons ==
In the television show The Simpsons, the character Dr. Marvin Monroe's voice was based on Viscott. Monroe has been retired since the seventh season because voicing the character strained Harry Shearer's throat. The character's retirement was marked by the broadcast of a Dr. Marvin Monroe Memorial Hospital over Lou's walkie-talkie in "Who Shot Mr. Burns? (Part Two)". Since then, several references to Monroe being dead have been made: a glimpse of his gravestone in "Alone Again, Natura-Diddily", a Dr. Marvin Monroe Memorial Gymnasium seen in "Bye Bye Nerdie", and a trivia interstitial in the "138th Episode Spectacular" regarding which popular characters had recently died. However, Monroe is seen alive in the fifteenth season in "Diatribe of a Mad Housewife" purchasing a copy of Marge's novel, The Harpooned Heart, stating simply that he had "...been very sick" when asked about his long absence by Marge. He was later seen as a ghost, claiming that he was "stuck in limbo" in "Treehouse of Horror XXV".

== Notable books by Viscott ==
- The Making of a Psychiatrist
- The Viscott Method
- Risking
- I Love You, Let's Work It Out
- The Language of Feelings
- Emotional Resilience ISBN 978-0-517-88825-4
- Finding Your Strength in Difficult Times
- Emotionally Free
- How to Live with Another Person
- Feel Free
- Winning
- Taking Care of Business
- What Every Kid Should Know
- Labyrinth of Silence
- Dorchester Boy: Portrait of a Psychiatrist as a Very Young Man ISBN 978-0877950707
