= Ed Bluestone =

American comedian, writer and actor (1948 or 1949 – 2024)

- Born: 1948 or 1949; East Orange, New Jersey, U.S.
- Died: October 24, 2024 (aged 75–76)
- Occupations: Comedian; writer; actor
- Years active: 1970s–1980s

Ed Bluestone (1948 or 1949 – October 24, 2024) was an American comedian, writer and actor.

Bluestone wrote for National Lampoon magazine and was the originator of the publication's most famous cover. He is also known for his role on the 1977 revival of the sketch comedy series Laugh-In.

== Early life ==
Bluestone was born in East Orange, New Jersey to a Jewish family.

He studied speech and drama at Monmouth College (now known as Monmouth University) in West Long Branch. He had the reputation of being the class clown, and in a 1967 interview of Monmouth College students by the Long Branch Daily Record, students were asked "What do you think you will be doing five years from now?" Bluestone's response was "Selling subway tokens." Bluestone eventually dropped-out and started performing stand-up comedy at 20 years of age.

== Career ==
Bluestone got his start in stand-up in New York City, first in folk clubs and coffee houses in Greenwich Village, before becoming a regular performer at the comedy clubs Catch a Rising Star and The Improv in Manhattan. He is known for his wry, deadpan delivery and for one-liners. He is also known for his dark sense of humor. Bluestone admired comedians such as Woody Allen, Jerry Lewis, Rodney Dangerfield and Richard Pryor.

In 1972 he started writing for National Lampoon magazine. Bluestone conceived of the magazine's famous cover from their 1973 Death issue. It featured a dog with a gun pointed to his head next to the title "If You Don't Buy This Magazine We'll Kill This Dog," which originated from a joke in Bluestone's stand-up act. Bluestone also produced two pieces for the Death issue titled "23 Ways to Be Offensive at the Funeral of Someone You Didn't Like" and "Telling a Kid His Parents are Dead". It was the magazine's best seller that year. The Lampoon cover was ranked number 7 on the American Society of Magazine Editors' list of the "Top 40 Magazine Covers of the Last 40 Years", published in 2005, and was also one of five covers listed in a 2018 article in The Guardian titled "The best magazine covers ever?"

A syndicated column featuring Bluestone, called "My Favorite Jokes", appeared in American newspapers nationally from 1973 to 1978. Each column opened with note from an unnamed "editor" who would provide a bit of information about Bluestone, followed by a curation of Bluestone's stand-up material.

By the mid-1970s Bluestone's name was included in articles on the "new breed" of comedians, alongside names such as Robert Klein, Lily Tomlin, Richard Pryor, George Carlin, Richard Lewis, Andy Kaufman and Elayne Boosler. He also became a paid regular at The Comedy Store in Los Angeles.

He appeared on the variety show Saturday Night Live with Howard Cosell in 1975 and appeared on three episodes of The Tonight Show Starring Johnny Carson in 1976. Bluestone appeared on the Dean Martin variety series Dean Martin's Comedyworld in 1974 and Dean's Place in 1976, in addition to serving as a roaster on the Gabe Kaplan and Peter Marshall episodes of The Dean Martin Celebrity Roast that aired in 1977.

Laugh-In producer George Schlatter visited The Improv to find talent for the show's 1977 revival. Schlatter told the Washington Post: "He hit me with one line. The line was, 'He's a quadrasexual. That means he'll do anything to anybody for a quarter.' When I hear that. I went crazy, and the club went crazy."

Bluestone dropped out of the public eye in the early 1980s. One of his last TV appearances was a 1982 episode of Late Night with David Letterman.

During a Reddit AMA by filmmaker Douglas Tirola about his 2015 documentary Drunk Stoned Brilliant Dead: The Story of the National Lampoon, Tirola was asked "Where is Ed Bluestone?", to which Tirola replied: "Ed Bluestone has a cameo in the movie visiting Los Angeles. And I believe he performs standup. He's still funny."

== Death ==
Bluestone died from complications of a stroke on October 24, 2024. He was survived by his ex-wife, brother, and three nieces.
