= Donna Theodore =

American actress and singer (1941-2024)

- Donna Theodore in 1970
- Born: Donna Glory Theodore; July 25, 1941; Pleasanton, California, U.S.
- Died: June 16, 2024 (aged 82); Palm Desert, California, U.S.
- Occupations: Actress, singer
- Spouse: Don Martin (m. 1994)

Donna Glory Theodore (July 25, 1941 – June 16, 2024) was an American actress and singer who first came to attention as a headliner at many famous nightclubs during the 1960s including the Copacabana, The Fountainebleau Hotel, the Fairmont Hotel, and El San Juan in Puerto Rico.

== Biography ==
Theodore began working professionally at the age of twelve. She appeared Off-Broadway as Eustacia Vye in the 1977 Hudson Guild Theater production of Dance On A Country Grave. Her success on Broadway led to concerts at major performance venues such as Carnegie Hall.

During the 1970s and 1980s, Theodore appeared regularly on many different talk and variety shows on television including Dick Cavett, Mike Douglas, and Merv Griffin. She is perhaps best remembered for her appearances with Johnny Carson on The Tonight Show, making more than 50 guest appearances. Theodore also created the role of Kitty Merritt on the daytime soap opera Search for Tomorrow, appeared in the television movie Face of Fear, and acted in numerous other popular television series like B. J. and the Bear, Family, Medical Center, Lanigan's Rabbi and Rosetti and Ryan.

In 2010, she performed on concert stages throughout the United States with her critically acclaimed tribute show, A Date with Judy—the Garland Years.

== Personal life ==
Theodore attended Amador Valley High School in Pleasanton, California. Theodore lived in Palm Desert, California, with her husband Don Martin, where they presented a spiritual and motivational program called "Performing Artists Living Spiritually."

She died on June 16, 2024 in Palm Desert, aged 82. She was survived by her husband, her brother, and extended family.

== Awards and honors ==
Theodore won a Theater World Award and received a Tony Award nomination for her performance in the 1975 musical Shenandoah.

She was the first person to receive a Drama Desk Award in the category of Outstanding Featured Actress in a Musical. Prior to the 1974–1975 awards, Drama Desk awards did not make distinctions between the sexes or musical versus dramatic roles.

== Bibliography ==
- Theodore, Donna G. (2008). The Message is in the Music. Infinity Publishing. ISBN 978-0741447593.
