= Skiles and Henderson =

American stand-up comedy act

- Born: Bill Skiles: William Al Skiles; July 5, 1931; San Antonio, Texas, U.S. Pete Henderson: Peter Carroll Henderson; April 28, 1938; Los Angeles County, California, U.S.
- Died: Bill Skiles: May 16, 2011 (aged 79); St. Cloud, Florida, U.S. Pete Henderson: March 1, 2018 (aged 79); Branson, Missouri, U.S.
- Cause of death: Bill Skiles: Kidney cancer Pete Henderson: Unknown
- Occupation: Comedians
- Spouse(s): Bill Skiles: Marilynn Lorraine Pierson (m. 1960 - 196?; 3 children) Arlene Adams (m. 1963; died 2011) Pete Henderson: Katharine Jackson (m. 1968-1972: 1 son); Linda Hartley (m. 1976 - ?)

Skiles and Henderson was a long-running American stand-up comedy act consisting of Bill Skiles (William Al Skiles, July 5, 1931 - May 16, 2011) and Pete Henderson (Peter Carroll Henderson, April 28, 1938 - March 1, 2018). With Henderson as the straight man and Skiles as the joker, they performed live and on many popular television shows. Their act began in 1958 at Disneyland, and they continued to perform together until 2010. Skiles died on May 16, 2011, and Henderson died on March 1, 2018.

== Performance style ==
Bill Skiles acted as the "frenzied, jabbering, sound-effecting clown to the straight man Pete Henderson". The act consisted mainly of improvised humor featuring sound effects and a variety of antics by Skiles, interfering with Henderson's attempts to tell a story or sing a popular song. During a serious rendition of "By the Time I Get to Phoenix", Henderson sang the lyric, "She'll probably stop at lunch--" only to be interrupted by Skiles imitating the screech of brakes and shouting,"Gimme a Big Mac!"

== History ==
The two men met in 1953 in Orange County, California. Their act started in 1958 at Disneyland as a song-and-dance act featuring musical instruments made by Skiles' father. Turning more towards comedy, in 1960 they had their professional debut at the Golden Nugget Las Vegas.

The duo played at nightclubs, showrooms and corporate events, and as a supporting act they toured with the New Christy Minstrels and The Carpenters. They made television appearances with Ed Sullivan, Dean Martin, Rowan and Martin, Bob Hope, Johnny Carson, Mike Douglas, David Frost and Merv Griffin.

Skiles and Henderson last performed in Arizona in March 2010. Skiles died on May 16, 2011, at the age of 79 at his home in St Cloud, Florida.
