= George Miller (comedian) =

Comedian

- Born: June 28, 1941; Seattle, Washington, US
- Died: March 5, 2003 (aged 61); Los Angeles, California, US

George Miller (June 28, 1941 – March 5, 2003), born George Wade Dornberger, was an American stand-up comedian.

Greatly influenced by comedian Mort Sahl, Miller first performed standup at age 21, starting in Seattle and eventually in the late 1960s moving onto Southern California and Los Angeles comedy clubs, making his network television debut on The Tonight Show in 1976. Thereafter he appeared regularly on TV talk programs, including The Mike Douglas Show, Dinah!, and many others. Miller was a guest on NBC's Late Night with David Letterman and CBS' Late Show with David Letterman 56 times in two decades. He was a "clean comic" with a sardonic wit. Making references to show business or current events, Miller was a "comedian’s comic", writing what David Letterman described as “very funny, intelligently constructed jokes, rather than comic musings.” PBS in Seattle shot a special called Funny Business with George Miller, following the comedian on the road, including to a taping of Letterman. The special was a first to look close-up on a life in the comedy “front lines,” and featured interviews with Letterman, as well as his mother and his long-term partner and manager. He acted as guest host for Joan Rivers on Fox’s The Late Show with Clint Holmes as his sidekick. He was a fiercely loyal friend to many in the West Coast comedy scene who later enjoyed tremendous success, including David Letterman, Robin Williams, Jay Leno and Jerry Seinfeld.

Miller died in 2003 aged 61 at UCLA Medical Center after a long bout with leukemia, from a blood clot in his brain. Letterman reportedly paid for Miller's medical expenses throughout his battle with leukemia, including a major donation to UCLA so Miller could be admitted into an experimental treatment program. Letterman also paid for Miller's funeral expenses (though was unable to attend due to being hospitalized for a severe case of shingles).
