= Julie Budd =

American singer (born 1954)

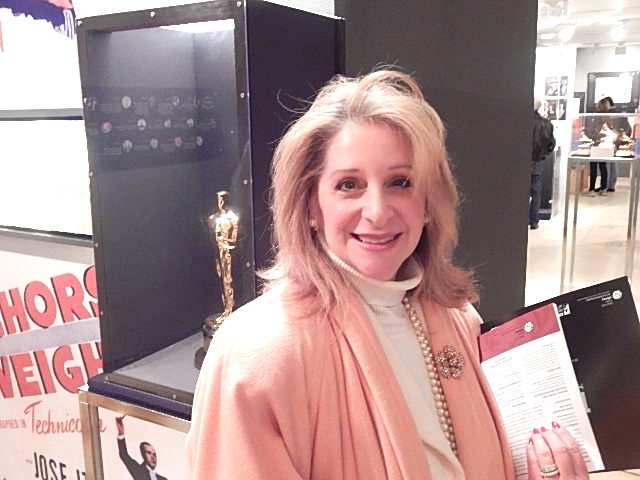
- Julie at Sinatra Exhibition

Background information
- Born: Edith Erdman; May 7, 1954 (age 72); Brooklyn, New York, US
- Genres: Broadway show tunes, jazz
- Years active: 1966–present
- Website: juliebudd.com

Julie Budd (born May 7, 1954) is an American recording artist and actress.

== Early life and education ==
Budd was born Edith Erdman in Brooklyn, New York, the second of three daughters of Joan and Saul Erdman, a bottling company executive. She attended the Roy H. Mann Jr. High School in Brooklyn until 1969, when she transferred to a private academy in Manhattan.

== Singing ==
Budd began her singing career at the age of 12 when, after winning amateur night at a resort camp, she was spotted by producer Herb Bernstein, who became her manager and arranger. After signing a contract for personal management, he also had her record a demo, and arranged for a three-year contract with Metro-Goldwyn-Mayer records. Budd also became a regular on the NBC summer series Showcase '68. She appeared on the Merv Griffin Show, The Ed Sullivan Show, The Tonight Show, The Carol Burnett Show and The Jim Nabors Hour. At the time, her style drew frequent comparisons to Barbra Streisand (to the point where she was mistakenly assumed to be Streisand's sister).

Appearing at Caesars Palace at the age of 16, Budd became the youngest opening act for Frank Sinatra. She also became a frequent performer on the Las Vegas Strip, supporting Sinatra, Liberace, George Burns, and Bob Hope. She performed the title song for the 1972 film Living Free, which played over the opening credits.

Budd continues to perform mainly in the New York City area and Las Vegas. She released the albums Pure Imagination (1997) and If You Could See Me Now (2000), and to commemorate Sinatra's centenary on December 12, 2015, she released an album, Remembering Mr. Sinatra. She also teaches master classes in singing.

== Concerts and symphonies ==
Budd has performed at Carnegie Hall, Lincoln Center and the Kennedy Center. She has also performed concerts and one-woman shows at the London Palladium and the Tel Aviv Performing Arts Center. She has worked with symphony orchestras including Baltimore Symphony, National Symphony, Pittsburgh Symphony, Austin Symphony, Alabama Symphony, Philadelphia Symphony, Dallas Symphony and the Milwaukee Symphony Orchestra.

== Acting ==
Budd is associated with the Circle Repertory Company and Playwrights Horizons of New York City. She starred in the 1981 Walt Disney film The Devil and Max Devlin as a 19-year-old high school dropout and aspiring singer. Budd has stated that "having the opportunity to work for the Disney Company was a life changer for me. At Disney they always do it right".
