= Kelly Garrett (singer) =

American actress

- Born: Ellen Boulton; March 25, 1944; Chester, Pennsylvania
- Died: August 7, 2013 (aged 69); Albuquerque, New Mexico
- Occupations: Singer, Actress

Kelly Garrett (March 25, 1944 – August 7, 2013) was an American actress and singer known for her work on the Broadway stage and on television. She was nominated for a Tony Award in 1976 for Best Featured Actress in a Musical.

== Early life ==
Garrett was born Ellen Boulton, one of 10 children of Sabina (née Griego), a nurse, and Jack Boulton, a marine. The family moved to Santa Fe, New Mexico where Garrett attended Catholic schools and began singing. She attended the Cincinnati Conservatory of Music before moving to Los Angeles to develop her singing career.

== Career ==
=== Television ===
In 1963, Garrett started releasing singles and performing on television. Between 1963 and 1979, she was the musical guest on The Tonight Show Starring Johnny Carson 16 times. She was a regular on The Real Tom Kennedy Show and made numerous appearances on Shindig!, The Dean Martin Show, Playboy After Dark, The Alan Thicke Show and Dinah!, among others. She was also a regular guest on the game shows The $10,000 Pyramid and Musical Chairs Her only film appearance was a non-speaking role in 1984's The Party Animal.

In 1976, Garrett performed on the Academy Awards singing "Richard's Window" from The Other Side of the Mountain, which was nominated for Best Original Song.

=== Broadway ===
In 1971, Garrett moved to New York and made her Broadway debut in the 1972 musical Mother Earth, for which she received a Theatre World award. In 1974 she performed in the musical revue Words & Music. In 1975 she performed in the musical revue The Night That Made America Famous, for which she was nominated for the Tony Award and the first Drama Desk Award for Outstanding Featured Actress in a Musical. She was considered for the lead role of Mabel in Mack & Mabel, losing the role to Bernadette Peters.

== Personal life and death ==
Garrett was once divorced and, through the 1970s and 1980s, was the girlfriend of television executive Roger Ailes, who was also her manager.

In the early 1990s, Garrett retired from performing and moved to Los Angeles, where she worked as a voice coach. In 2006, she moved to Rio Rancho, New Mexico and worked as an arts educator. She died on August 7, 2013, in an Albuquerque, New Mexico hospice of throat and tongue cancer, age 69.

== Discography ==
=== Albums ===
- Kelly, 1976

=== Singles ===
- "Tommy Makes Girls Cry" / "Baby It Hurts", 1963
- "I Don’t Think He’s Coming" / "This Heart Is Haunted", 1964
- "Save Me From Myself" / "The Boy On The Drums", 1965
- "A Toy In The Hands Of A Child" / "The Answer To A Young Girl’s Prayer", 1965
- "Love’s The Only Answer" / "Knowing When To Leave", 1968
- "You Step Into My World" / "Nothing Left to Give", 1969
- "Is This The Way A Marriage (Has To Be)" / "If Today (Could Be Like Yesterday)", 1973
- "As Far As We Can Go", 1975
- "Leavin’ On Your Mind" / "He Moves Me", 1976
- "With You" / "Lay Me Down", 1977
- "Love’s the Only Answer" / "Psychedelic Soul", with Saxie Russell, 2011
