= Stan Kann =

American theatre organist and vacuum cleaner collector (1924–2008)

Stan Kann (December 9, 1924 – September 29, 2008) was a locally-famous professional theatre organist in St. Louis, Missouri, whose hobby of collecting and demonstrating vacuum cleaners, plus a talent for comedy, brought him national recognition as a frequent television talk-show guest in the 1960s. For 22 years, he was resident organist at the Fox Theatre.

== Organist ==
Kann, a native of St. Louis, began playing the organ at age 4. He majored in classical organ at Washington University in St. Louis. In the late 1940s, he persuaded the management of the Fox Theatre in St Louis to allow him to refurbish its 4-36 Fox Special Wurlitzer, which had lain idle for twenty years, and became the official house organist in 1952. Kann served as the theater's resident organist until 1974, four years before the Fox closed. In 1956, Kann installed a Wurlitzer in the famous St. Louis restaurant "Ruggeri's On The Hill" (later owned by Stan Musial) and played there regularly until 1974. His Saturday evening performances at Ruggeri's were broadcast on NBC from 1964 to 1974.

== Talk show guest ==
Kann's first appearance on The Tonight Show was June 8, 1966. He had been booked to discuss some of the prized carpet sweepers from his 150-item collection."I planned on showing the vacuums as a kind of historical demonstration. I had no idea what it would turn into," Kann told a reporter for the St. Louis Post-Dispatch.

Once Kann began demonstrating the sweepers on air, parts began to fall off the vacuum cleaners at inopportune moments. Tonight Show host Johnny Carson saved the situation with humorous ad libs, and Kann was invited to make 76 additional appearances on The Tonight Show. Kann had been introduced to Carson through Phyllis Diller. He met Diller when she made a guest appearance on The Charlotte Peters Show, a local St. Louis television program. Kann served as musical director and co-host on the show, and Diller was impressed by Kann's wit. "When she saw my vacuum (collection) she said, 'I'm going to call the Carson show, cause you're nuts,'" Kann said in an Associated Press interview.

Kann also made 89 appearances on The Mike Douglas Show and was a guest on talk shows hosted by Merv Griffin and Gypsy Rose Lee.

== Biography ==
Kann became interested in vacuum cleaners at age 8. His interest primarily stemmed from the fact that his parents couldn't afford to buy one. Kann developed the ability to distinguish different models of vacuum cleaners by sound. If, while walking down the street, he heard a cleaner he didn't recognize, he had no qualms about knocking on the door and asking to see the sweeper. "Sometimes they'd say yes, and sometimes they'd say no," Kann told the Post-Dispatch interviewer. He briefly worked as a vacuum cleaner salesman in high school. Kann moved from Missouri to Los Angeles in 1975, but returned to St. Louis in 1998 for hip replacement surgery.

Kann died at Saint Louis University Hospital of complications from open heart surgery.

== Select discography ==
- The Pipes Of Stan – Norman Records – LP catalog # NS 213 – 1966
- Stan Kann In St Louis – Malar Productions – LP catalog # MAS 2018 – 1972
- Anything Goes – Piping Hot Productions – CD catalog # 1001 – 1996
- Pipe Organ Extravaganza 2 – Rialto Square Theatre – CD catalog # N/A – 1997
- Stan Kann At Dickenson – Dickenson Theatre Organ Society – CD catalog # 121 – 2001
- Meet Me At The Fox – Kann Productions – CD catalog # N/A – 2003
- Pipes And Power – Kann Productions – CD catalog # N/A
- Christmas With Stan Kann – Kann Productions – cassette catalog # N/A
