= William A. Nolen =

American surgeon and author (1928–1986)

William A. Nolen (March 20, 1928 – December 20, 1986) was a surgeon and author who resided in Litchfield, Minnesota. He wrote a syndicated medical advice column that appeared in McCall's magazine for many years, and was the author of several books. He died on December 20, 1986, at the University of Minnesota Medical Center, from heart disease.

== Career ==
Nolen's best-known book is The Making of a Surgeon, which continues to be a popular (though now dated) narrative about his experiences as an intern and resident surgeon-in-training at Bellevue Hospital in New York City. Many students contemplating medical school find that it guides their decision.

Nolen conducted research at a 1973 Kathryn Kuhlman fellowship in Philadelphia, with 23 people who claimed to have been cured during her services. Nolen's long-term follow-ups concluded there were no cures in those cases. Furthermore, "one woman who was said to have been cured of spinal cancer threw away her brace and ran across the stage at Kuhlman's command; her spine collapsed the next day, according to Nolen, and she died four months later."

Nolen is also known for his book Healing: A Doctor in Search of a Miracle (1974). He spent two years examining faith healers and concluded that no patients with organic disease had been cured. He investigated psychic surgery and discovered it was based on sleight of hand trickery. He uncovered many cases of fraud.

== Publications ==
- The Making of a Surgeon. Mid List Press (1970, 1990) ISBN 0-922811-46-6
- A Surgeon's World. New York: Random House (1972) ISBN 0-394-46745-0
- Healing: A Doctor in Search of a Miracle. New York: Random House (1974) ISBN 0-394-49095-9
- Surgeon Under the Knife. Book World Promotions (1976) ISBN 0-698-10743-8
