= Lendon Smith =

American OB/GYN, pediatrician, author and television personality

- Born: Lendon Howard Smith; June 3, 1921; Portland, Oregon
- Died: November 17, 2001 (aged 80); Portland, Oregon
- Occupations: Pediatrician, author, television personality
- Years active: 1963–2001

Lendon Howard Smith (June 3, 1921 – November 17, 2001) was an American Ob/Gyn, pediatrician, author, and television personality. He was notable for his advice on parenting and advocating children's health and eating issues. He was known to fans as "The Children's Doctor" for his expertise on the issues and an outspoken proponent of the use of vitamins for children.

Smith was criticized by nutritionists for promoting the dangerous belief that large megavitamin dosages would help cure any disease or disorder.

== Background ==
Born in Portland, Oregon, Smith was a second generation doctor (his father was also a pediatrician), having received his M.D. in 1946 from the University of Oregon Medical School. He served as captain in the United States Army Medical Corps from 1947 to 1949, went on to a pediatric residency at St. Louis Children's Hospital in Missouri, and completed it at Portland's Doernbecher Memorial Hospital in 1951. In 1955, Smith became Clinical Professor of Pediatrics at the University of Oregon Medical Hospital. He would practice pediatrics for 35 years before losing his medical license in 1987, after which he continued to lecture, to write, and to help make "megavitamin" a household word and promote megavitamin therapy, in which he advocated the uses of Vitamin A and Vitamin C in massive amounts.

Smith was also among the first to caution against sugar, white flour, and junk food known to contribute to sickness, hyperactivity, obesity, allergies, and many illnesses in children and adults. He was also vocal about his feelings towards the use of vaccines and modern drugs: "Modern drugs and vaccines have proven to be a hoax in attaining health. They have brought false hopes......The vaccinations are not working, and they are dangerous.. We should be working with nature." He also argued against the use of experimental treatment in children with ADHD.

Smith was also a fixture on television, which is where he would receive the nickname "The Children's Doctor", which was also the title of his 5-minute ABC daytime show that ran from 1967 to 1969. He also appeared on The Tonight Show Starring Johnny Carson (with the audience in stitches as he talked on and on) a record 62 times, and on The Phil Donahue Show 20 times. But he would become more famous for appearing in a 1977 ABC Afterschool Special called My Mom's Having a Baby, about a 10-year-old boy's curiosity about how babies are born. The special proved to be popular with viewers and was awarded a Daytime Emmy. Smith would return in 1980 for the sequel Where Do Teenagers Come From?, which dealt with a 12-year-old girl's puberty. He also authored or co-authored more than 15 books, ranging from parenting and children's issues to nutrition.

== Controversies ==
Smith was placed under probation by the Oregon Board of Medical Examiners in 1973 for prescribing medication that was "not necessary or medically indicated" for six adult patients, one diagnosed as hyperactive and the other five as heroin addicts. He was restricted to practicing pediatrics by the board that same year but was allowed to authorize prescriptions again in 1974. He was placed on probation again in 1975 after the board determined that he was prescribing Ritalin to "too many children," only to be reinstated in 1981. This would be one of the many issues that would result in him surrendering his license in 1987, as he was under pressure from insurance companies and the Board of Medical Examiners over his ethical practices, in which he had signed documents authorizing insurance payments for patients he had not seen. The patients had actually been seen by chiropractors, homeopaths, and others whose treatment was not covered at the clinics in which he had worked.

He remained involved with medicine through writing and lecturing, this time promoting alternative medicine. He helped to promote the Life Balances International Program. In 2001 he was involved with the Church of Scientology as he appointed himself as the commissioner of the Citizens Commission on Human Rights.

In 1993, Smith was featured in a marketing video "Homeopathic Care of Infants and Children", that promoted him as a physician, even though he was not licensed to practice as one. The video has been described by medical experts as dangerous. In the video Smith promoted dubious homeopathic remedies for chicken pox, colds, constipation, coughs, diarrhea, earaches, flu, headaches, measles and sore throats.

Stephen Barrett of Quackwatch has noted that Smith advocated for pregnant women, "daily supplements of 20,000 to 30,000 units of vitamin A, a dosage high enough to cause birth defects." Nutritionist Kurt Butler described Smith as a quack who promoted dangerous medical advice. According to Butler:

Besides encouraging people to poison themselves and their kids with toxic doses of supplements, he recommends raw milk, avoiding foods you are allergic to because they cause obesity, diagnosis by hair analysis and cytotoxic testing, taking thyroxin pills, taking glandulars, fasting to the point of feeling weak and sick, and lots of other nonsense. Smith's books are hoaxes because there is not a scrap of scientific evidence to support his claims.

In his book Dr. Lendon Smith's Low-Stress Diet, he recommended his readers to practice fasting and take only distilled water and supplements for several days to cleanse the liver. He was criticized for this erroneous belief. During fasting the liver is not cleansed but overworks by saturating it with toxins produced by starvation.

== Death ==
Smith died on November 17, 2001, after having open heart surgery. He was 80.

== Selected publications ==
- Feed Your Kids Right (1979)
- Dr. Lendon Smith's Low-Stress Diet Book (1988)
- Feed Your Body Right: Understanding Your Individual Body (1993)
- How to Raise a Healthy Child (1996)

== See also ==
- Orthomolecular medicine
- Vitamin C megadosage
