= Kip Addotta =

American comedian (1944–2019)

- Born: Kip Francis Addotta; June 16, 1944; Rockford, Illinois, U.S.
- Died: August 13, 2019 (aged 75); Los Angeles, California, U.S.
- Resting place: Westwood Village Memorial Park Cemetery
- Occupations: Comedian, singer, songwriter, actor
- Children: 3

Francis Kip Addotta (June 16, 1944 – August 13, 2019) was an American stand up comedian. He made several appearances on television during the 1970s including The Tonight Show Starring Johnny Carson, The Mike Douglas Show, Dinah!, American Bandstand, The Midnight Special, Don Kirshner's Rock Concert, and the game shows The Hollywood Squares and Make Me Laugh. Addotta was also featured on the Dr. Demento radio show. He is probably best known for his comedy recording "Wet Dream". Other recordings include "Big Cock Roach" and "Life in the Slaw Lane."

Addotta appeared as the opening act for several superstars like Diana Ross, Paul Anka and Liza Minnelli, among others. He also hosted the game show Everything Goes on the Playboy Channel, and has appeared in a number of films, including the Woody Guthrie biopic Bound for Glory (1976), and TV acting appearances, including The Larry Sanders Show. His early recordings were with Laff Records.

== Personal life ==
Addotta was born in Rockford, Illinois to Frank and Josephine Addotta (née Bucalo). He had an older half-sister named Kathie from his mother's previous marriage. His mother left when Addotta was two years old and took Kathy with her. His father abused him both emotionally and physically, and eventually placed him in an orphanage when he was four years old. His paternal grandmother Francesca Addotta then took him in to live with her. His grandmother and his grandfather Jesper ("Gaspare") had both come to the US from Sicily. In his autobiography, Confessions Of A Comedian, Addotta describes his grandmother as an associate of the Bonanno crime family. She died when he was 15. His grandmother had wanted him to become a priest, but he became a barber instead and managed a salon. He married his first wife, Mary, in 1962. Mary died in 1966; the couple had two children. Addotta had another child with his second wife, Lynn. Aged 27, he moved with his family to Los Angeles to try his luck at comedy. After performing several months at The Comedy Store, his career as a stand-up comedian took off.

Addotta was the father of three children: Victor, Katheryn and Frank. He has one grandchild by his daughter Katheryn, and two grandchildren by his son Frank.

Addotta died on August 13, 2019, aged 75.

== Releases ==
DVD

- 1995 – Live From Maximum Security!

CD

- 1979 – I Hope I'm Not Out Of Line
- 1985 – The Comedian Of The United States
- 1985 – Life In The Slaw Lane
- 1989 – I Saw Daddy Kissing Santa Claus
- 1994 – The Trouble Hole
- 2002 - Jokes To Go
- 2013 – Portable Kip
- 2014 – Ears to You

Vinyl

- 1984 – White Boy Rapp

Books

- 2018 – Confessions of a Comedian – An Autobiography

== Sources ==
- Addotta, Kip (2018). Confessions of a Comedian – An Autobiography. New York: Beacon Publishing Group. ISBN 978-0998593241.
