= Norm Crosby =

American comedian (1927–2020)

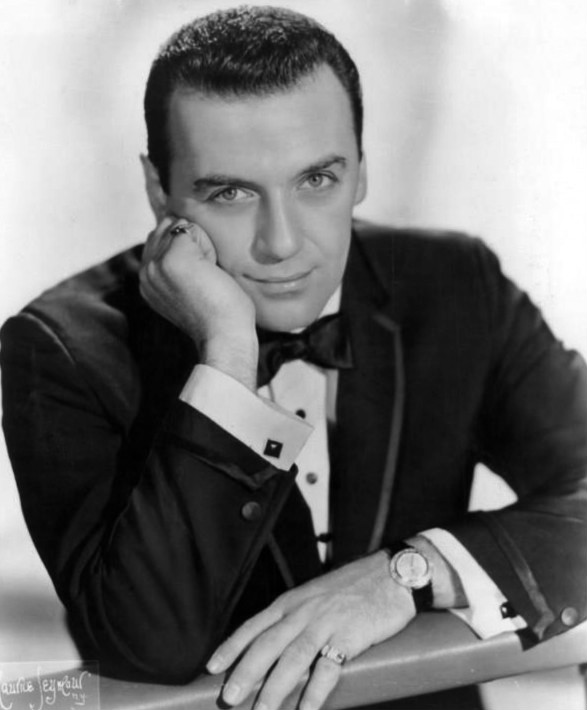
- Crosby in 1965
- Born: Norman Lawrence Crosby; September 15, 1927; Boston, Massachusetts, U.S.
- Died: November 7, 2020 (aged 93); Los Angeles, California, U.S.
- Resting place: Hillside Memorial Park Cemetery
- Occupation: Comedian
- Spouse: Joan Crane Foley (m. 1966)
- Children: 2

Norman Lawrence Crosby (September 15, 1927 – November 7, 2020) was an American comedian born in Boston, Massachusetts. He was often referred to as "The Master of Malaprop".

== Early and personal life ==
Crosby was born and was raised in Dorchester, Boston on September 15, 1927, to his Jewish family. He is the son of Ann (née Lansky) and John Crosby.

During World War II, Crosby served aboard a US Coast Guard submarine chaser in the North Atlantic. He suffered permanent damage of his hearing from a concussion he received from the depth charges that exploded while he was on anti-submarine patrol. He did not notice hearing problems until long after he had returned home and wore a hearing aid onstage.

In 1966, Crosby married Joan Crane Foley. They had two children. He became a Freemason in 1956, and served as Master of at least one lodge and participated in many charitable activities. He was a member of Ionic Composite Lodge #520 in Los Angeles, California.

== Career ==
Crosby went solo as a stand-up comedian, adopting a friendly, blue collar, guy-next-door persona in the 1950s. Crosby refined his standup monologues by interpolating malapropisms. He first appeared on The Tonight Show Starring Johnny Carson in December 1964. In late-1968, he co-starred on The Beautiful Phyllis Diller Show, an NBC twelve-week series. Crosby made two guest appearances on Adam-12, the first in 1971 as guest star Dewey Conroy in the episode "Reason to Run", then later in 1972 as guest star as Charlie in the episode "Eyewitness". In 1974, he co-hosted a Canadian variety television series, Everything Goes. From 1974 through 1984 he was on over half a dozen Dean Martin Celebrity Roasts including one of George Burns and two separate ones of Redd Foxx. From 1978 through 1981, he hosted a nationally syndicated series, The Comedy Shop, in which a mix of up-and-coming stand-up comics and vaudeville legends presented their material.

In the late 1970s and early 1980s, Crosby became a commercial pitchman for Anheuser-Busch Natural Light beer. During this time, he also appeared as a celebrity guest on a number of game shows, including Celebrity Bowling, Liar's Club, Tattletales, and Hollywood Squares.

From 1983 until the program's dissociation from Jerry Lewis in 2010, Crosby co-hosted and contributed to the annual Jerry Lewis MDA Labor Day Telethon.

He has a star on the Hollywood Walk of Fame at 6560 Hollywood Boulevard.

He appeared in two films with Adam Sandler – Eight Crazy Nights (2002) and Grown Ups 2 (2013)

== Death ==
Crosby died of heart failure at his home in Los Angeles, California, on November 7, 2020, at the age of 93.
