= Irving Benson =

American actor and comedian

Irving Benson (né Irving Wishnew; January 31, 1914 – May 19, 2016) was an American actor and comedian. He was one of the last survivors of the vaudeville era.

Having enjoyed a long and successful run on the east coast American Burlesque circuit, Benson travelled west to play Las Vegas for the first time in 1957, with the Minsky Follies show. Benson gained national exposure during the 1960s, when fellow vaudevillian Milton Berle hired him to play a faux heckler named Sidney Spritzer.

The character would turn up in the balcony overlooking the stage of Berle's variety show (where the studio audience could see him) and banter with Berle about the host's alleged lack of talent and originality. The character was likely the inspiration for The Muppets' Statler and Waldorf. Benson became Johnny Carson's favorite comic and appeared frequently on the Carson-hosted Tonight Show. He was honored for Best Documentary at the 2011 Backlot Film Festival for "The Last First Comic" uncovering the roots of American comedy also going inside the colorful world of the Burlesque show.

Benson, born Irving Wishnew married Lillian Waldowsky on November 19, 1936. Their 79-year marriage, which lasted until her death in March 2016, remains the longest entertainment industry marriage on record, surpassing Peggy Craven and Norman Lloyd's 75-year marriage in 2012. The couple had two children, five grandchildren, and seven great-grandchildren. He turned 100 in January 2014, and died on May 19, 2016, at the age of 102, in Port Jefferson, New York.

== Filmography ==
- 1961: Scanty Panties (Gambler)
- 1966: The Milton Berle Show (Sidney Sphritzer)
- 1968: The Hollywood Palace (Sidney Sphritzer)
- 1970: Which Way to the Front? (German Officer, uncredited)
- 1979: Happy Days (Irv Hanson)
