= David Horowitz (consumer advocate) =

American consumer advocate and journalist (1937–2019)

- Born: David Charles Horowitz; June 30, 1937; The Bronx, New York City, U.S.
- Died: February 14, 2019 (aged 81); Los Angeles, California, U.S.
- Occupation: Consumer advocate
- Spouse(s): Judith Rosenthal (m. 1964; div. 1969) Suzanne McCambridge (m. 1973)
- Children: 2

David Charles Horowitz (June 30, 1937 – February 14, 2019) was an American consumer reporter and journalist for KNBC in Los Angeles, whose television program Fight Back! would warn viewers about defective products, test advertised claims to see if they were true, and confront corporations about customer complaints. He was on the boards of directors of the National Broadcast Editorial Conference, City of Hope, and the American Cancer Society, and he served on the advisory boards of the FCC and the Los Angeles District Attorney.

Horowitz has been described as a consumer advocate; he shunned the description, noting that he always tried to maintain an objective point of view toward both the consumer and the businesses he profiled.

== Early life ==
Horowitz attended Bradley University, where he became a member of Alpha Epsilon Pi, and graduated with high honors in 1959. Horowitz earned a master's degree in journalism from Northwestern University in 1961, then worked at newspapers and TV stations in the Midwest, including KRNT-TV (now KCCI) in Des Moines, Iowa. He was a writer for The Huntley–Brinkley Report.

== Television career ==
Horowitz opened the first news bureau for NBC News during the Vietnam War.

In early 1973, Horowitz was offered a chance to develop a consumer-awareness news segment for KNBC, NBC's flagship Los Angeles station. He nearly turned it down because they had offered it to six other people before him. Nevertheless, the segment on KNBC Newservice was successful, and Horowitz gained a reputation through the 1970s as a consumer reporter and advocate. He began the weekly consumer advocate program Fight Back! with David Horowitz in 1976, and he made appearances on NBC programs including regular appearances on the Today program and on America Alive! in 1978.

Horowitz made a guest appearance on The Super Mario Bros. Super Show! in 1989. He also appeared as himself on an episode of Silver Spoons, ALF, The Golden Girls, The Munsters Today, and Saved by the Bell. Horowitz was also a regular guest on The Tonight Show Starring Johnny Carson and had a reserved parking spot next to Johnny Carson on the NBC lot in Burbank.

Horowitz left KNBC in August 1992 after the station declined to renew his contract and joined KCBS-TV the following year, where he resumed his Fight Back! segments for Channel 2 Action News.

== Hostage situation ==
On August 19, 1987, during the 4 p.m. edition of KNBC's Channel 4 News, a gun-wielding man named Gary Stollman got into NBC's Burbank Studios as a guest of a former employee and took Horowitz hostage live on the air. With the gun pressed to his side, Horowitz calmly read the gunman's statements about the CIA and mental health hospitals on camera, but unbeknownst to the gunman, the news feed had been taken off the air and staff members put up a technical difficulties graphic. The man identified himself and at the end of his statement he set the gun down on the news desk, at which point anchorman John Beard quickly confiscated it. The weapon was later revealed to have been an unloaded BB gun. The incident led Horowitz to start a campaign to ban realistic toy guns.

== Controversies ==
In 1998, Horowitz joined a political campaign to urge voters to defeat a California ballot initiative calling for a 20% cut in electricity rates for private utility customers and ending surcharges on ratepayers to pay for nuclear power plants. Horowitz later admitted he was paid $106,000 by the campaign.

== Death ==
Horowitz died on February 14, 2019, from complications due to dementia.
