= Joan Embery =

American animal and environmental advocate (born 1949)

- Born: Joan Marie Embery; June 1, 1949 (age 77); San Diego, California, U.S.
- Education: Eastern Illinois University
- Awards: List

Joan Marie Embery is an American environmental and animal advocate, notable for her appearances on television shows and programs such as The Tonight Show Starring Johnny Carson and The Tonight Show with Jay Leno.

== Career ==
Embery was a trustee of the Morris Animal Foundation, a professional fellow of the Association of Zoos and Aquariums, a member of the Advisory Board of the UC Davis School of Veterinary Medicine's Wildlife Health Center, and a founding member of the American Association of Zoo Keepers. The goodwill ambassador to the Zoological Society of San Diego (which oversees both the San Diego Zoo and San Diego Zoo Safari Park) for 32 years, she has also hosted educational series such as Animal Express, Animals of Africa, Baby Panda, and Challenges to Wildlife on public broadcasting. She has raised awareness of animals and wildlife conservation through her books, tours, projects, and appearances on television shows.

Over the course of her decades-long career, she and her many animal ambassadors appeared nearly 70 times on The Tonight Show with Johnny Carson. According to Embery herself, however, that number is closer to 100, with additional appearances while Jay Leno was hosting. She was especially enjoyed by Johnny Carson and his audiences, where various animal guests included a baby elephant who could “paint,” a tarantula, a baby rhinoceros, a lion cub, and a pygmy marmoset who jumped from Joan’s arm to Johnny’s arm, up to his shoulder, then to the top of his head, before sitting quietly and urinating there, on live television. Embery said that the marmoset was “content” and “marking its territory,” given that apparently, it had its tail wrapped around Johnny Carson’s ear as well.

== Personal life ==
=== Marriage ===
Joan Embery and Duane Pillsbury (1929–2020) were married almost 42 years, until his death at age 91. Embery and Pillsbury met when she was 30 and he was 50 through the matchmaking efforts of one of Pillsbury's two daughters, who shared with Embery a mutual interest as competitive female equestrians. During their marriage, Pillsbury always accompanied Embery on her world travels and TV appearances.

=== Ranch ===
Embery and Pillsbury made their home at Pillsbury Ranch, a 50-acre (20 ha) ranch in east county San Diego, home to show horses, wildlife ambassadors, the native wildlife, and personal pets. Two of her most well-known animals were a zebra, who would graze on her front lawn, and a toco toucan. The Pillsbury Land & Livestock Co. property hosted many fundraisers for civic, environmental, and animal conservation groups over the years.

=== Equestrian interests ===
In addition to being an environmental advocate, Embery is a skilled horsewoman who has won many trophies, including in the areas of dressage, cutting, jumping, and driving. On Embery's ranch, she raises and trains various horse breeds, mules, and her California State Grand Champion bull.

== Honors ==
- Embery was inducted into the San Diego County Women's Hall of Fame in 2007.
- Outstanding Celebrity Philanthropist – Rotary International, San Diego Chapter
- Distinguished Alumna Award – Eastern Illinois University 1998
- Cool Women – Girl Scouts of San Diego 2012
- Women Who Mean Business Community Service Award – 2015
