= List of The Tonight Show Starring Johnny Carson episodes (1972) =

- No. of episodes: 257

Release
- Original network: NBC

Season chronology
- ← Previous; 1971 episodes Next → 1973 episodes

The following is a list of episodes of the television series The Tonight Show Starring Johnny Carson which aired in 1972. In October, 1962 Johnny Carson took over as host of the show from the previous host Jack Paar.

== 1972 ==
=== January ===
No.	Original release date	Guest(s)	Musical/entertainment guest(s)
2367	January 3, 1972	Phyllis Newman (guest host), David Frye, Anne Jackson, George Maharis, Joseph Bologna, Renée Taylor, Eli Wallach	Monti Rock
2368	January 4, 1972	Dr. Irwin Maxwell Stillman, Billy De Wolfe, The Amazing Randi	Teresa Brewer
2369	January 5, 1972	Mr. Blackwell, Stephen R. Hudis	Jose Molina, Bette Midler
2370	January 6, 1972	Marcel Marceau	Artie Shaw, Buddy Rich, Marilyn Maye
2371	January 7, 1972	Gene Hackman, Jerzy Kosiński, Jose Molina, Tom O'Horgan, Irwin C. Watson	Linda Hopkins
2372	January 10, 1972	Pearl Bailey (guest host), Maya Angelou	Bill Withers
2373	January 11, 1972	Pete Hamill	Lana Cantrell
2374	January 12, 1972	John Carradine, Cloris Leachman, Albert Brooks	Los Indios Tabajaras
2375	January 13, 1972	Karen Morrow, Jack Douglas and wife Reiko	N/A
2376	January 14, 1972	John Wayne, Mark Rydell, Totie Fields	Johnnie Ray
2377	January 17, 1972	Joey Bishop (guest host), Dick Martin, Yvonne Constant	Sandler and Young
2378	January 18, 1972	Joey Bishop (guest host), Barbara Walters, Bob Melvin	Robert Merrill
2379	January 19, 1972	Joey Bishop (guest host), Ann Corio, Pat Cooper, Dick Gregory, Dr. Joyce Brothers	Carlos Montoya
2380	January 20, 1972	Joey Bishop (guest host), Corbett Monica, David Frye, Martina Arroyo	Lucky Peterson
2381	January 21, 1972	Joey Bishop (guest host), Jake LaMotta, The Amazing Randi, Moms Mabley, Stanley Myron Handelman	N/A
2382	January 24, 1972	Joey Bishop (guest host), Barbara Walters, Nipsey Russell, Hugh O'Brian	Liz Torres
2383	January 25, 1972	George Segal, David Brenner, Greer Garson, Tom Baker	Phyllis Newman
2384	January 26, 1972	Lloyd Bridges, Jerry Lucas	Richie Havens, Ace Trucking Company
2385	January 27, 1972	Rob Reiner, Ashley Montagu, Mary Storrs, Milt Moss	Karen Morrow, Mac Davis
2386	January 28, 1972	Orson Bean	N/A
2387	January 31, 1972	Burt Reynolds (guest host), Howard Cosell, Karen Valentine, Helen Gurley Brown	Bobby Goldsboro, Margaret Whiting

=== February ===
No.	Original release date	Guest(s)	Musical/entertainment guest(s)
2388	February 1, 1972	George Carlin, Alan King, Cyb Barnstable	Linda Hopkins, Liberace
2389	February 2, 1972	Gig Young, Robert Klein, Pamela Mason, Earl Wilson, Jim Bailey	Maxine Weldon
2390	February 3, 1972	Lee Marvin, Rodney Dangerfield	Marilyn Horne, Phyllis Newman
2391	February 4, 1972	Suzanne Pleshette	N/A
2392	February 14, 1972	Sammy Davis Jr., Bette Davis, Foster Brooks, Carol Wayne	Johnny Mathis
2393	February 15, 1972	Lawrence Welk, Buddy Hackett, Steve Martin, Mary Storrs	Johnny Mathis
2394	February 16, 1972	Efrem Zimbalist Jr.	N/A
2395	February 17, 1972	Ben Johnson	Bette Midler
2396	February 18, 1972	Burt Reynolds, Billy De Wolfe, Albert Brooks	Pat Boone
2397	February 21, 1972	George Burns, Richard Harris	Don Ho
2398	February 22, 1972	Jack Benny, Lana Wood, Dr. David Reuben	Lola Falana
2399	February 23, 1972	Elke Sommer, Jonathan Miller	Ike & Tina Turner
2400	February 24, 1972	Victor Buono, Alex Karras, Adelle Davis, Karl Wallenda	Della Reese
2401	February 25, 1972	Redd Foxx, Karen Valentine, Bob Hope	Tennessee Ernie Ford
2402	February 28, 1972	Jonathan Winters, Smothers Brothers, Chuck Woolery	Julie London, Bobby Troup
2403	February 29, 1972	Ann-Margret, Flip Wilson, George Carlin, Susan Saint James	N/A
Mighty Carson Art Players- "Ironfeet" (parody of "Ironside"); Flip Wilson and George Carlin present The Best of the News.

=== March ===
No.	Original release date	Guest(s)	Musical/entertainment guest(s)
2404	March 1, 1972	Joan Embery, Rob Reiner, Jo Anne Worley, Tony Randall	Pat Boone
2405	March 2, 1972	George Gobel, Orson Bean, Suzanne Pleshette, Pamela Mason	Maxine Weldon
2406	March 3, 1972	John Wayne, Debbie Reynolds, Buddy Hackett	Kaye Ballard, Roy Clark
2407	March 6, 1972	David Steinberg, Buffy St. Marie	Bobby Darin
2408	March 7, 1972	Florence Henderson, James Caan	N/A
2409	March 8, 1972	Howard Cosell, Jaye P. Morgan, Pete Hamill, Susan Hampshire	Johnnie Ray
2410	March 9, 1972	Shecky Greene	Bobby Goldsboro
2411	March 10, 1972	Joan Rivers (guest host), Lucie Arnaz	Anthony Newley
2412	March 13, 1972	Richard Hart (guest host), Virginia Graham, William Peter Blatty, Kreskin, Malachy McCourt	N/A
2413	March 14, 1972	Melvin Belli, Bill Bixby, Myron Cohen	Bette Midler
2414	March 15, 1972	David Brenner, William Saroyan, Sarah Kennedy	James Brown
2415	March 16, 1972	George Maharis, Larry Storch, Roger Kahn	Phyllis Newman
2416	March 17, 1972	Jim Fowler	N/A
2417	March 20, 1972	Dom DeLuise (guest host), Cloris Leachman	N/A
2418	March 21, 1972	Lily Tomlin	N/A
2419	March 22, 1972	Goldie Hawn, John Byner, Dr. Leo Madow, Dr. Neil Solomon	Dusty Springfield
2420	March 23, 1972	Joan Rivers	Beverly Sills
2421	March 24, 1972	Mickey Rooney, Tim Rooney, Robert Klein, Gerald A. Browne	Linda Hopkins
2422	March 27, 1972	Burt Reynolds (guest host), Billy De Wolfe, Judy Carne, Leonard Frey	Teresa Graves
2423	March 28, 1972	Orson Bean, Jennifer O'Neill, David Brenner	Henry Mancini, John Twomey
2424	March 29, 1972	Bruce Dern, George Carlin, Elia Kazan	Frankie Avalon
2425	March 30, 1972	Maureen Stapleton	N/A
2426	March 31, 1972	Joe Garagiola, Ruth Gordon, Betsy von Furstenberg	Caterina Valente

=== April ===
No.	Original release date	Guest(s)	Musical/entertainment guest(s)
2427	April 3, 1972	David Steinberg (guest host), Howard Cosell, Virginia Graham, Rip Taylor, Gay Talese	Gerri Granger, Linda Hopkins
2428	April 4, 1972	Truman Capote, Alexis Smith, Vida Blue, Dr. Irwin Maxwell Stillman	Linda Hopkins
2429	April 5, 1972	none	Phyllis McGuire
2430	April 6, 1972	Tony Randall, Charlie Callas, John McGiver, Tim Dinsdale, Dr. Irwin Maxwell Stillman	Lynn Anderson
2431	April 7, 1972	Don Rickles, Diane Keaton, Dr. Michael Fox	Monti Rock
2432	April 11, 1972	David Steinberg, Neil Sheehan, Joe Garagiola	N/A
2433	April 12, 1972	Rex Reed, Valerie Perrine, Johnny Bench	N/A
2434	April 13, 1972	Rodney Dangerfield, Skye Aubrey, Leonard Frey, Alan King	Marilyn Horne
2435	April 14, 1972	Eli Wallach, Slappy White, Jerzy Kosiński	N/A
2436	April 17, 1972	Orson Bean, Tom Goreman	Bette Midler
2437	April 18, 1972	Gore Vidal, David Brenner, Sam Blotner	Lana Cantrell
2438	April 19, 1972	Burt Reynolds, Sid Caesar, Sammy Davis Jr.	Phyllis Newman
2439	April 20, 1972	Howard Cosell, Bob Uecker, Dorothy Collins	Stiller and Meara
2440	April 21, 1972	Desi Arnaz, Rip Taylor, Jack Douglas and wife Reiko	Enzo Stuarti, Linda Hopkins
2441	April 24, 1972	Joey Bishop (guest host), Phil Silvers	Sandler and Young, Liz Torres
2442	April 25, 1972	Joey Bishop (guest host), Carl Ballantine, Virginia Graham, Albert S. Ruddy, Allan Drake	Al Green
2443	April 26, 1972	Joey Bishop (guest host), David Niven, Helen Gurley Brown, Phil Foster	Abbe Lane
2444	April 27, 1972	Joey Bishop (guest host), Nipsey Russell, Professor Irwin Corey, Rocky Graziano	Jose Molina, Monica Maris
2445	April 28, 1972	Joey Bishop (guest host), Allan Drake	Bobby Goldsboro
This is the last Tonight Show Starring Johnny Carson episode to tape at 30 Rockefeller Center in New York City before its permanent move to the NBC Studios in Burbank, California, although it would return to New York City for 2 final series of shows in November 1972 and May 1973.

=== May ===
No.	Original release date	Guest(s)	Musical/entertainment guest(s)
2446	May 1, 1972	Bob Newhart, Cal Worthington, Darlene Conley, Don Rickles, Nancy Reagan, Shelley Winters	N/A
Beginning with this episode, The Tonight Show Starring Johnny Carson moved to the NBC Studios in Burbank, California, and, except for 2 final series of shows in November 1972 and May 1973, remained in Burbank until the end of Carson's run on May 22, 1992.
2447	May 2, 1972	Rob Reiner, George Carlin, Carol Wayne, Mr. Blackwell	Johnny Mathis performed ("To the Ends of the Earth", "The First Time Ever I Saw Your Face")
T.V. Guide Quotes
2448	May 3, 1972	Jo Anne Worley, Michael Constantine, Paul Williams	Andy Williams
2449	May 4, 1972	Suzanne Pleshette, Arthur Siegel, Dr. David Reuben	Ike & Tina Turner, Kaye Ballard
2450	May 5, 1972	Shecky Greene, Phyllis Diller	N/A
2451	May 8, 1972	Joan Embery, Albert Brooks, James Coco, Joseph Wambaugh	Gladys Knight & the Pips, Petula Clark
2452	May 9, 1972	Billy De Wolfe, James Franciscus, Dr. Irwin Maxwell Stillman	Roger Miller
2453	May 10, 1972	Sammy Davis Jr., Karen Valentine	Ethel Waters, Kenny Rogers
2454	May 11, 1972	Charlton Heston, George Gobel	Jimmy Osmond, Lola Falana
2455	May 12, 1972	Vincent Price, David Frye, Sarah Kennedy	Joan Baez
2456	May 15, 1972	Joan Rivers (guest host), Eva Gabor, Charles Nelson Reilly, Virginia Graham	Anthony Newley, Maxine Weldon
2457	May 16, 1972	Debbie Reynolds, Fernando Lamas	Trini Lopez
2458	May 17, 1972	Lana Turner, Mickey Rooney, Adelle Davis	Vikki Carr
2459	May 18, 1972	June Allyson, Jim Fowler, John Cassavetes, Ronnie Schell	N/A
2460	May 19, 1972	Mitzi Gaynor, Robert Blake, Adelle Davis, Gwen Davis	John Twomey
2461	May 22, 1972	Rodney Dangerfield, Jo Anne Worley, Cliff Robertson, Vidal Sassoon	Roy Clark
2462	May 23, 1972	Dom DeLuise, Tony Randall, Carol Hughes, Dr. Joel Futrel, Dr. Vince Friedewald, Paul Williams	N/A
2463	May 24, 1972	Woody Allen, Earl Holliman	Della Reese
2464	May 25, 1972	Peter Fonda, Beverly Garland, Karen Rosenblatt, Victor Buono	Vic Damone
2465	May 26, 1972	Barry Sullivan, Bill Dana	Clara Ward Singers, Roger Miller
2466	May 29, 1972	Edward Asner, Eva Gabor, Billy De Wolfe, Marcia Wallace	Charles Aznavour
2467	May 30, 1972	Maureen Stapleton, Jason Robards, Helen Gurley Brown, Gay Talese	Jerry Reed, Ray Charles
2468	May 31, 1972	Pete Hamill, Stephanie Edwards	Pat Boone

=== June ===
No.	Original release date	Guest(s)	Musical/entertainment guest(s)
2469	June 1, 1972	John Davidson, William Holden, Pete Hamill, Martin Rackin, Luciana Paluzzi	N/A
2470	June 2, 1972	Nancy Sinatra, David Steinberg, George Gobel, Simon Argevitch	Nancy Sinatra & Lee Hazlewood
2471	June 5, 1972	Pat Boone (guest host), Karen Valentine, Clint Walker	N/A
2472	June 6, 1972	none	N/A
2473	June 7, 1972	John Wayne, Ann-Margret, Carol Burnett, Sandy Duncan	N/A
2474	June 8, 1972	Dennis Weaver, Lorna Luft, Myron Cohen, Oral Roberts	N/A
2475	June 9, 1972	none	N/A
2476	June 12, 1972	Flip Wilson (guest host), George Carlin	Sarah Vaughan
2477	June 13, 1972	Flip Wilson (guest host), Coretta Scott King	Helen Reddy, The Dells, Burns & Schreiber
2478	June 14, 1972	Flip Wilson (guest host), Bill Russell, Kreskin, Larry Storch, Nikki Giovanni	Erroll Garner
2479	June 15, 1972	Flip Wilson (guest host), Pat Paulsen	N/A
2480	June 16, 1972	Flip Wilson (guest host), Steve Allen, Jayne Meadows, Amarillo Slim, Bill Dana	Kenny Rankin, Willie Bobo
2481	June 19, 1972	Don Rickles (guest host), Carroll O'Connor, Richard Benjamin, Paula Prentiss	Della Reese, Jerry Vale
2482	June 20, 1972	Don Rickles (guest host), Lee Marvin, Laffit Pincay Jr., Janice Harper, Muhammad Ali, Don Adams	Della Reese
2483	June 21, 1972	Don Rickles (guest host), Bob Newhart, Karen Black, James Caan	Johnny Tillotson
2484	June 22, 1972	Don Rickles (guest host), Corbett Monica, Cleveland Amory, Alex Karras, Redd Foxx	Sergio Franchi
2485	June 23, 1972	Don Rickles (guest host), Sally Struthers, Ray Milland, Sally Stevens	Jackie Ward, Wayne Newton
2486	June 26, 1972	Danny Thomas, Howard Cosell, Jimmy Allen	Jim Nabors
2487	June 27, 1972	Suzanne Pleshette, George Peppard, Rodney Dangerfield	N/A
2488	June 28, 1972	Elsa Lanchester, Joe Flynn, Michael Crichton	Johnny Mathis
2489	June 29, 1972	George Burns, Patti Deutsch, Buddy Rich, Cathy Rich	James Brown
2490	June 30, 1972	Orson Bean, Arthur Siegel, David Brenner	Kaye Ballard, Lola Falana

=== July ===
No.	Original release date	Guest(s)	Musical/entertainment guest(s)
2491	July 3, 1972	George Carlin (guest host), Debbie Reynolds	Dan Hicks and his Hot Licks
2492	July 4, 1972	Mickey Rooney, Martin Poriss, Billy De Wolfe, Buddy Hackett, Marcia Wallace	James Brown, Lyn Collins
2493	July 5, 1972	Joan Rivers	Burns & Schreiber
2494	July 6, 1972	Edward Asner, Robert Blake, Shelley Winters, Dr. Kay Straud	Harry Chapin
2495	July 7, 1972	Robert Mitchum, Ken Sansom, Robert Klein	Lana Cantrell, Mac Davis
2496	July 10, 1972	Joey Bishop (guest host), Redd Foxx	Gladys Knight & the Pips
2497	July 11, 1972	Joey Bishop (guest host), Jack Klugman, Harris Nelson, Stanley Myron Handelman, Rose Marie	Bobby Goldsboro
2498	July 12, 1972	Joey Bishop (guest host), Charles Nelson Reilly, Helen Gurley Brown	Pat Boone
2499	July 13, 1972	Joey Bishop (guest host), Rex Reed, Morty Gunty, Professor Backwards, Broderick Crawford	N/A
2500	July 14, 1972	Joey Bishop (guest host), Ricardo Montalbán, Pepper Davis, Luciana Paluzzi, Stan Kann	Al Martino
2501	July 17, 1972	Joey Bishop (guest host), Rip Taylor, Pamela Mason, Jan Murray, Harris Nelson	Charo
2502	July 18, 1972	Slappy White, Bob Seagren, Dr. Jean Rosenbaum	N/A
2503	July 19, 1972	Tony Randall, Cheryl Miller, Dr. Sidney Garfield	Cass Elliot
2504	July 20, 1972	Truman Capote, Joe Flynn	Jack Jones
2505	July 21, 1972	Albert Brooks, Sam Peckinpah	N/A
2506	July 24, 1972	Bobby Darin (guest host), Dr. Irwin Maxwell Stillman	Nancy Wilson
2507	July 25, 1972	Bobby Darin (guest host), Joan Embery, Jo Anne Worley	Pat Boone
2508	July 26, 1972	Earl Holliman, Jim Ahern	N/A
2509	July 27, 1972	James Stewart and wife Gloria, Slappy White, Sam Blotner	N/A
2510	July 28, 1972	June Allyson, Alexis Smith, Patti Deutsch	Kenny Rankin
2511	July 31, 1972	David Hartman (guest host), Bob Uecker, Gwen Davis, Richard M. Powell, Bobby Wick	Lola Falana

=== August ===
No.	Original release date	Guest(s)	Musical/entertainment guest(s)
2512	August 1, 1972	Lorna Luft, Robert Blake, Joan Rivers, Joseph Wambaugh	N/A
2513	August 2, 1972	Richard Harris, Florence Henderson	N/A
2514	August 3, 1972	Jack Benny	Harry Chapin
2515	August 4, 1972	Redd Foxx, Dr. Paul Ehrlich	Trini Lopez
2516	August 7, 1972	Joey Bishop (guest host), Jack Klugman, Carol Wayne, Rose Marie	Bobby Goldsboro
2517	August 8, 1972	Andy Griffith, Paul Williams, Dick Clair, Amarillo Slim	N/A
2518	August 9, 1972	Frank Buxton, Gail Parent, Kenny Solms	Vikki Carr
2519	August 10, 1972	Charlie Callas, Joe Flynn, Dr. Irwin Maxwell Stillman	Della Reese
2520	August 11, 1972	David Brenner, Claude Steines	Mac Davis, Melba Moore
2521	August 14, 1972	Joey Bishop (guest host)	N/A
Desk- "Little Known Facts"
2522	August 15, 1972	Joey Bishop (guest host), Danny Thomas, Arnold Beichman	Burns & Schreiber, Jim Croce, Maury Muehleisen
2523	August 16, 1972	Joey Bishop (guest host), Jon Voight, Shecky Greene, Jenna McMahon, Dick Clair	N/A
2524	August 17, 1972	Joey Bishop (guest host), Marty Feldman	Arlo Guthrie, Pete Seeger
2525	August 18, 1972	Bob Hope	Lana Cantrell, John Denver
2526	August 21, 1972	Joey Bishop (guest host), Redd Foxx, Leonard Barr	Bobby Rydell
2527	August 22, 1972	Joey Bishop (guest host), Charles Nelson Reilly, Sandy Baron	Jose Molina, Eartha Kitt
2528	August 23, 1972	Joey Bishop (guest host), Nipsey Russell	N/A
2529	August 24, 1972	Joey Bishop (guest host), Dom DeLuise, Lainie Kazan, Pepper Davis, Regis Philbin, Tony Reese	The Agostinos
2530	August 25, 1972	Joey Bishop (guest host), Norm Crosby, Marcia Wallace, Gene Nelson, Cleveland Amory	N/A
2531	August 28, 1972	Joey Bishop (guest host), Helen Gurley Brown, Jackie Vernon, Stan Kann, Virginia Graham, Demond Wilson	N/A
2532	August 29, 1972	Joey Bishop (guest host), Dr. Joyce Brothers, Rip Taylor, Carol Lynley	Lou Rawls
2533	August 30, 1972	Joey Bishop (guest host), Henny Youngman	Mel Carter
2534	August 31, 1972	Joey Bishop (guest host), Aileen Eaton, Milt Kamen	Abbe Lane, Mel Carter

=== September ===
No.	Original release date	Guest(s)	Musical/entertainment guest(s)
2535	September 1, 1972	Joey Bishop (guest host), Richard Dawson, Phil Foster	Charo
2536	September 4, 1972	Joey Bishop (guest host), Victor Buono, Professor Backwards, Rose Marie, Amanda Ambrose	Joanie Sommers
2537	September 5, 1972	George Gobel, Jill St. John	Paula Kelly
2538	September 6, 1972	Steve Martin, Joe Flynn	Cass Elliot
2539	September 7, 1972	Eva Gabor, Joseph N. Sorrentino	Roger Miller
2540	September 11, 1972	Joey Bishop (guest host), Fernando Lamas, Pat Henry, Leonard Barr	Edie Adams, Monica Maris
2541	September 12, 1972	Karen Valentine, Rodney Dangerfield	Larry Kert, Phyllis McGuire
Carnac the Magnificent
2542	September 13, 1972	George Burns, Susan Saint James, Reverend Billy Graham	Ricky Nelson
2543	September 14, 1972	Jim Fowler, George Maharis	Ace Trucking Company
2544	September 15, 1972	Burt Reynolds, Peter Falk, Albert Brooks, Dr. Melvin Anchell	Vikki Carr
Desk- "Burt Reynolds Walk-On"
2545	September 18, 1972	Joey Bishop (guest host), Broderick Crawford, Rex Reed, Professor Backwards	N/A
2546	September 19, 1972	Bob Hope, Dom DeLuise, Peter Fonda	John Denver ("It's a Sin To Tell a Lie" and "Prisoners")
Things to Do When Bored
2547	September 20, 1972	Don Rickles, Hal David, Dr. Irwin Maxwell Stillman	Pat Boone, Dionne Warwick
Ripley's Believe It or Not
2548	September 21, 1972	Jonathan Winters, Carol Wayne	N/A
2549	September 22, 1972	Shecky Greene, Peaches Jones	Ace Trucking Company, Tommy Leonetti
2550	September 25, 1972	Joey Bishop (guest host), Charles Nelson Reilly, Sandy Baron	Eartha Kitt
2551	September 26, 1972	Tony Randall, Paul Williams, Redd Foxx, Martin Poriss	N/A
T.V. Programs in Development For Next Season
2552	September 27, 1972	Robert Klein, Jaye P. Morgan, Frank Buxton, Terry Meeuwsen	N/A
Terry Meeuwsen became Pat Robertson's co-host of The 700 Club in 1993.
2553	September 28, 1972	Dennis Weaver, Totie Fields, Billy De Wolfe	Joe Williams
Stump the Band
2554	September 29, 1972	Joan Rivers, Earl Holliman, Mitzi Gaynor, John Kidner, Carazini	N/A
How Johnny and Ed Meet

=== October ===
No.	Original release date	Guest(s)	Musical/entertainment guest(s)
2555	October 2, 1972	Jack Benny, Joey Bishop, George Burns, Jerry Lewis, Don Rickles, Dan Rowan, Dick Martin, Dinah Shore, Gov. Ronald Reagan, Don Durgin, Dean Martin (taped cameo)	N/A
10th anniversary show.
2556	October 3, 1972	Sandy Duncan, Rodney Dangerfield, Joseph N. Sorrentino	N/A
Johnny showed some film of his marriage announcement at the party given for him at the Beverly Hills Hotel by NBC, and showed some NFL film footage.
2557	October 4, 1972	Bob Hope, Charlie Callas, Gig Young	Ike & Tina Turner ("It's Gonna Work Out Fine", "Let Me Touch Your Mind")
Prop piece- "Memorabilia from The Tonight Show"
2558	October 5, 1972	Betty Ann Carr, Carroll O'Connor, Rona Jaffe	Burns & Schreiber
Provocative Newspaper Titles; Burns & Schreiber performs the panhandler routine
2559	October 6, 1972	Shelley Winters, Patti Deutsch, George Maharis	Kenny Rankin ("String Man")
Bobby Fischer Interview
2560	October 9, 1972	Joey Bishop (guest host), Pat Paulsen	Della Reese, Sandler and Young
Audience Imitations
2561	October 10, 1972	Lorne Greene, Myron Cohen, James Coco	Lola Falana ("Fever")
Carnac the Magnificent
2562	October 11, 1972	Florence Henderson, Orson Bean, George Carlin, Dr. Melvin Anchell	N/A
2563	October 12, 1972	Steve Martin, Madalyn Murray O'Hair	Roger Miller
Ripley's Believe It or Not; Stump the Band
2564	October 13, 1972	James Franciscus, David Brenner, Joe Flynn	N/A
Johnny showed some NFL film.
2565	October 16, 1972	Joey Bishop (guest host), Steve Allen, Jayne Meadows, Dr. Laurence J. Peter, Milt Kamen, E.J. Pealser	N/A
2566	October 17, 1972	Joey Bishop (guest host), Dr. Joyce Brothers, Jack E. Leonard	Erroll Garner, Jim Weatherly, Pearl Bailey
2567	October 18, 1972	Joey Bishop (guest host), Ross Martin, Pat Cooper, Stan Kann	Cass Elliot
2568	October 19, 1972	Joey Bishop (guest host), Vincent Price, David Frye	Erroll Garner, Charo
Audience Talent Contest
2569	October 20, 1972	Joey Bishop (guest host), Leonard Barr, Jack Douglas and wife Reiko	Janis Ian, Pat Boone
2570	October 23, 1972	George Kirby, Helen Gurley Brown, Luciana Paluzzi	Liz Torres
2571	October 24, 1972	John Davidson, Stanley Myron Handelman, Richard Boone	Jose Molina
2572	October 25, 1972	Bruce Dern, Micki King	Johnny Mathis ("Where Is the Love?", "Alone Again")
Aunt Blabby
2573	October 26, 1972	Charles Nelson Reilly, Cicely Tyson	N/A
2574	October 27, 1972	Mickey Rooney, Artie Shaw, Ethel Waters	Julie Budd ("It's Too Late Baby", "The Way You Love")
Tribute to McDonald's
2575	October 30, 1972	Lorne Greene (guest host), Marty Allen, Adelle Davis	Billy Daniels, Edie Adams
2576	October 31, 1972	Frederick Forsyth, Elsa Lanchester	Trini Lopez
Accidents With The Staff

=== November ===
No.	Original release date	Guest(s)	Musical/entertainment guest(s)
2577	November 1, 1972	Victor Buono, Patti Deutsch, Mark Stone	Vikki Carr
Halloween Pranks
2578	November 2, 1972	Jo Anne Worley, Alex Karras, John Landis	Charles Aznavour ("Dance in The Old-Fashioned Way" and "What Makes Man a Man")
Lesser Known World Records
2579	November 3, 1972	Joan Embery, Graham Kerr, Joe Flynn	Dana Valery
Joan Embery of the San Diego Zoo makes her first appearance on The Tonight Show Starring Johnny Carson.
2580	November 6, 1972	Danny Thomas, Jaye P. Morgan, George Maharis	Ace Trucking Company
Desk- "Polls"; Stump the Band (11/7/72 pre-empted for NBC News Election Night Coverage)
2581	November 8, 1972	Suzanne Pleshette, Dom DeLuise, Bobby Fischer	José Feliciano
2582	November 9, 1972	Joan Rivers, Rob Reiner, Dr. David Reuben	Bee Gees ("Living in Chicago" and "Alive")
T.V. Guide Listings
2583	November 10, 1972	Shecky Greene, Robert Shaw, Karen Valentine	Diana Ross
2584	November 13, 1972	(FROM NEW YORK CITY) Muhammad Ali, Mayor John Lindsay, Teddy Kollek, Michael Preminger	Harry Chapin ("Greyhound")
The show traveled back to 30 Rockefeller Center in New York City.
2585	November 14, 1972	(FROM NEW YORK CITY) Ashley Montagu	Bobby Goldsboro, Phyllis Newman, Bob & Ray
NFL Football Clip
2586	November 15, 1972	(FROM NEW YORK CITY) Jerry Lewis, Paul Williams	Paul Williams ("Here's That Rainy Day")
How to Meet New Friends While in Transit
2587	November 16, 1972	(FROM NEW YORK CITY) Debbie Reynolds, Rex Reed, Patsy Kelly	Larry Kert, Linda Hopkins
Carnac the Magnificent
2588	November 17, 1972	(FROM NEW YORK CITY) Gig Young, Joe Garagiola	Bette Midler, Los Indios Tabajaras
Unusual Hobbies
2589	November 20, 1972	(FROM NEW YORK CITY) Jennifer O'Neill, Charlie Callas	Ethel Merman ("It's De-Lovely")
Amusing News Items
2590	November 21, 1972	(FROM NEW YORK CITY) Diane Keaton, Orson Bean, Dan Jenkins	Richie Havens
How to Sober up a Drunk
2591	November 22, 1972	(FROM NEW YORK CITY) Lorne Greene, Rodney Dangerfield, James Coco	Marilyn Maye ("You've Got a Friend")
Stump the Band
2592	November 23, 1972	(FROM NEW YORK CITY) Billy De Wolfe	Ben Vereen, John Rubinstein
NFL Film Clip
2593	November 24, 1972	(FROM NEW YORK CITY) Tony Randall, David Brenner, Jaye P. Morgan, Mark Stone	Oleg Popov, Jaye P. Morgan performed ("This Masquerade")
Review of Ed's Show at the St. Regis
2594	November 27, 1972	(FROM NEW YORK CITY) Joe Frazier, Truman Capote, Robert Klein	Tammy Grimes
Letters to Santa
2595	November 28, 1972	(FROM NEW YORK CITY) Anthony Quinn, David Steinberg, William F. Buckley Jr.	Lana Cantrell
2596	November 29, 1972	(FROM NEW YORK CITY) Margaret Truman	Buddy Rich, Marilyn Horne, Ace Trucking Company
Split Billboards
2597	November 30, 1972	(FROM NEW YORK CITY) Jerry Orbach	N/A

=== December ===
No.	Original release date	Guest(s)	Musical/entertainment guest(s)
2598	December 1, 1972	Joe Namath (guest host), Barbara Walters, Otto Preminger, Pat Henry	Dana Valery, Ace Trucking Company
2599	December 4, 1972	Suzanne Pleshette, Don Rickles	Don Ho ("Lovers Prayer" and "It's Impossible")
Aunt Blabby
2600	December 5, 1972	Steve Martin	Lola Falana, Mac Davis
Stump the Band
2601	December 6, 1972	Robert Blake, Sammy Davis Jr., Inga Nielsen, Dr. William A. Nolen	N/A
2602	December 7, 1972	Bob Hope, Carol Burnett, Joe Flynn, Dr. William Nolen	N/A
Motion Picture 'Spin-Off' Titles
2603	December 8, 1972	Joan Rivers (guest host), Charles Nelson Reilly, Milt Kamen, Kreskin	Kaye Ballard, Maxine Weldon
2604	December 11, 1972	Steve Allen, Harriet Gibson, Jackie Forrest, Dr. Irwin Maxwell Stillman	Martina Arroyo
2605	December 12, 1972	Charlton Heston, George Carlin, Joseph N. Sorrentino	Kenny Rankin
How to Write a Thank You Note For a Gift You Don't Like
2606	December 13, 1972	Patti Deutsch, George Maharis, Sharon Johansen	Della Reese
2607	December 14, 1972	James Garner, Bruce Dern, Terry Galanoy	N/A
Mighty Carson Art Players- "Frankenstein's Monster" with a surprise appearance by Ed Sullivan; Reads Letters from Grade 4 students at Lincoln Elementary School in Framingham, Massachusetts
2608	December 15, 1972	Sammy Davis Jr., Sandy Duncan, Mickey Rooney	Melanie
2609	December 18, 1972	Sammy Davis Jr., Robert Blake	N/A
New Products
2610	December 19, 1972	Joey Bishop (guest host), Danny Thomas, Norm Crosby, Stan Kann	Roger Miller
2611	December 20, 1972	Joey Bishop (guest host), George Foreman	James Brown, Kentucky Fried Theatre
2612	December 21, 1972	Joey Bishop (guest host), Fernando Lamas, Rich Little, Virginia Graham, Leonard Barr	N/A
2613	December 22, 1972	Joey Bishop (guest host), Walter Matthau, Allan Drake, Martin Ritt	Charo
2614	December 25, 1972	Milt Kamen, Rose Marie, Sarah Kennedy	Frankie Avalon, Gloria Loring
2615	December 26, 1972	Adelle Davis, Jan Murray, Stanley Myron Handelman	Johnny Cash
2616	December 27, 1972	Steve Martin, F. Lee Bailey	Buddy Rich, The Mills Brothers
Carnac the Magnificent
2617	December 28, 1972	Gene Hackman, Diane Keaton, Michael Preminger, Patrick McGrady	Diane Keaton performed ("There's a Lull in My Life")
New Year's Eve Night Club Ads
2618	December 29, 1972	Desi Arnaz Jr., Jaye P. Morgan, Dr. Irwin Maxwell Stillman	David Clayton-Thomas
How to Know When You've Had Enough to Drink

== Sources ==
- "An Entertaining Hour: It's Tony and Dinah And Sonny And Cher". St. Petersburg Independent. Vol. 65, no. 52. January 3, 1972. p. 11-B – via Google Books.
- "Live Performances Slated By Hollywood TV Theatre". St. Petersburg Independent. Vol. 65, no. 55. January 6, 1972. p. 17-B – via Google Books.
- "Philippine Natives Face Onslaught Of Civilization". St. Petersburg Independent. Vol. 65, no. 60. January 12, 1972. p. 15-B – via Google Books.
- "Preview Of Great Films Will Whet Fans' Appetites". St. Petersburg Independent. Vol. 56, no. 56. January 7, 1972. p. 19-B – via Google Books.
- Pearson, Howard (January 11, 1972). "TV Highlights: Film Classics Of The Past". Deseret News. Vol. 377, no. 9. p. C5 – via Google Books.
- Pearson, Howard (January 10, 1972). "TV Highlights: More Stars On Laugh-In". Deseret News. Vol. 377, no. 8. p. 2B – via Google Books.
