= List of The Tonight Show Starring Johnny Carson episodes (1971) =

Episodes in 1971

- No. of episodes: 257

Release
- Original network: NBC

Season chronology
- ← Previous; 1970 episodes Next → 1972 episodes

The following is a list of episodes of the television series The Tonight Show Starring Johnny Carson which aired in 1971. In October, 1962 Johnny Carson took over as host of the show from the previous host Jack Paar.

== 1971 ==
=== January ===
| No. | Original release date | Guest(s) | Musical/entertainment guest(s) |
|---|---|---|---|
| 2109 | January 1, 1971 | Jerzy Kosinski, Peter Hurkos | Junior Mance, Ronnie Dyson, Tiny Tim |
| 2110 | January 4, 1971 | Sammy Davis Jr. (guest host), Redd Foxx | Irene Cara |
| 2111 | January 5, 1971 | Andy Griffith | Ace Trucking Company |
| 2112 | January 6, 1971 | Jerry Lewis (guest host), Totie Fields, Dr. Irwin Maxwell Stillman, Mr. Blackwell | N/A |
| 2113 | January 7, 1971 | Rodney Dangerfield, David Steinberg, Willie Stargell, Jerzy Kosinski | Della Reese |
| 2114 | January 8, 1971 | David Brenner, Jack Cassidy | Bob & Ray |
| 2115 | January 11, 1971 | David Steinberg (guest host), Elaine Stritch, Peter Stone, Helen Gurley Brown, Richard Chamberlain | Bette Midler, Monti Rock |
| 2116 | January 12, 1971 | Jerry Lewis (guest host), Yvonne de Carlo, Albert Brooks | N/A |
| 2117 | January 13, 1971 | Jerry Lewis (guest host) | N/A |
| 2118 | January 14, 1971 | Eli Wallach, Anne Jackson, Jo Anne Worley, Rodney Dangerfield | N/A |
| 2119 | January 15, 1971 | TBA | N/A |
| 2120 | January 18, 1971 | Bob Newhart (guest host), Milton Berle, Don Rickles, Hugh Downs, Pat Henry, Alan King | Jerry Vale, Ray Stevens, Sheila MacRae |
| 2121 | January 19, 1971 | Bob Newhart (guest host), Joseph Sirola, Stanley Myron Handelman, Hugh Downs | Della Reese |
| 2122 | January 20, 1971 | Bob Newhart (guest host), Don Rickles, Pat Henry | Bernadette Peters, Cass Elliot, Edmunds & Curly |
| 2123 | January 21, 1971 | Alan King (guest host), Tony Randall, Brenda Vaccaro, Dr. William Nolen | Sergio Mendes & Brasil '66, Helen Reddy |
| 2124 | January 22, 1971 | Della Reese (guest host), Rodney Dangerfield, Selma Diamond | Ronnie Dyson, Tony Bennett, Los Indios Tabajaras |
| 2125 | January 25, 1971 | Joan Rivers (guest host) | N/A |
| 2126 | January 26, 1971 | Anthony Quayle, Rachel Roberts | Donna Theodore, Los Indios Tabajaras |
| 2127 | January 27, 1971 | Joan Rivers, David Brenner, David Hartman, Jerzy Kosinski | Phyllis Newman |
| 2128 | January 28, 1971 | Jaye P. Morgan, Leonard Frey | Marilyn Maye |
| 2129 | January 29, 1971 | James Coco, Elaine Stritch, Barbara Sharma, Bob Kaufman | Phyllis Newman, Los Indios Tabajaras |

=== February ===
| No. | Original release date | Guest(s) | Musical/entertainment guest(s) |
|---|---|---|---|
| 2130 | February 1, 1971 | Gig Young, Diane Keaton, Patsy Kelly, Carol Channing | Buddy Rich |
| 2131 | February 2, 1971 | TBA | N/A |
| 2132 | February 3, 1971 | Dr. Irwin Maxwell Stillman, Melanie Henderson, Bill Toomey, Mary Toomey | Della Reese, Ronnie Dyson |
| 2133 | February 4, 1971 | Sandy Baron, Gwen Davis, Marilyn Michaels, Helen Gallagher | Monti Rock |
| 2134 | February 5, 1971 | Bob Newhart (guest host), Eli Wallach, Jack Cassidy, Ashley Montagu | Kaye Stevens, Lynn Anderson |
| 2135 | February 8, 1971 | John Wayne, Ben Gazzara, Ann-Margret, Jack Benny, Peter Falk, Red Skelton, John Cassavetes | N/A |
| 2136 | February 9, 1971 | Albert Brooks, George Kennedy, Jaye P. Morgan, Nancy Sinatra, Pamela Mason | Roger Miller, The Edwin Hawkins Singers |
| 2137 | February 10, 1971 | Bob Hope, Mayor Sam Yorty | Johnny Mathis, Kaye Ballard |
| 2138 | February 11, 1971 | Dan Rowan, Dick Martin, Charles Nelson Reilly, John Byner, Johnny Brown | Cass Elliot, Johnny Mathis |
| 2139 | February 12, 1971 | TBA | Nancy Wilson |
| 2140 | February 15, 1971 | Walter Matthau, Jack Lemmon, James Stewart | N/A |
| 2141 | February 16, 1971 | Ricardo Montalbán, Dinah Shore, Harold Sakata | N/A |
| 2142 | February 17, 1971 | Jack Benny, David Steinberg, Lily Tomlin | N/A |
| 2143 | February 18, 1971 | George Burns, Jo Anne Worley, George Gobel | Della Reese, Bee Gees |
| 2144 | February 19, 1971 | Robert Shaw | Trini Lopez, Vikki Carr |
| 2145 | February 22, 1971 | Dr. William Nolen | Connie Stevens |
| 2146 | February 23, 1971 | Joan Rivers, Gail Fisher, Dr. Jonathan Karas | Hines, Hines & Dad, Monti Rock |
| 2147 | February 24, 1971 | Elliott Gould, Kreskin | Mac Davis, Tammy Grimes |
| 2148 | February 25, 1971 | Bob Hope, Burt Lancaster, Jerry Lewis | Nitty Gritty Dirt Band |
| 2149 | February 26, 1971 | James Coco, Rodney Dangerfield, Diane Keaton, Jack Cassidy, Diana Sands | N/A |

=== March ===
| No. | Original release date | Guest(s) | Musical/entertainment guest(s) |
|---|---|---|---|
| 2150 | March 1, 1971 | Totie Fields, Albert Brooks, Sue Ane Langdon | Louis Armstrong |
| 2151 | March 2, 1971 | David Brenner | Buddy Rich |
| 2152 | March 3, 1971 | Bill Cosby, Bob Kaufman | Clifton Davis |
| 2153 | March 4, 1971 | Sargent Shriver, Tony Randall, Hal Frazier, Bob Uecker | Dana Valery |
| 2154 | March 5, 1971 | Joan Rivers (guest host), Noel Harrison | N/A |
| 2155 | March 8, 1971 | Robert Young, Alan Shepard, Stuart Roosa, Edgar Mitchell, Corbett Monica | Abbe Lane |
| 2156 | March 9, 1971 | Clement Freud, David Frye, Stanley Myron Handelman, Gordon MacRae | Donna Theodore |
| 2157 | March 10, 1971 | Marilyn Michaels, Pat Henry, Dr. Joyce Brothers | Glen Campbell, Jerry Reed |
| 2158 | March 11, 1971 | Joey Bishop (guest host), Selma Diamond, Marty Brill, Nipsey Russell, Elaine Stritch | Dick Jensen, Louis Prima |
| 2159 | March 12, 1971 | Joey Bishop (guest host), Barbara Sharma, Dr. Irwin Maxwell Stillman | Tammy Grimes |
| 2160 | March 15, 1971 | Joey Bishop (guest host), James Coco, Milt Kamen, Kreskin | Al Martino, Charo |
| 2161 | March 16, 1971 | Joey Bishop (guest host), Mickey Rooney, London Lee | Eloise Laws, Enzo Stuarti |
| 2162 | March 17, 1971 | Joey Bishop (guest host), Joe Garagiola, Mel A. Bishop | Dana Valery, James Brown, Vicki Anderson, Patti Austin |
| 2163 | March 18, 1971 | Joey Bishop (guest host) | N/A |
| 2164 | March 19, 1971 | Joey Bishop (guest host), Carol Channing, Helen Gurley Brown, Jack Cassidy, Bob Melvin | Marilyn Maye |
| 2165 | March 22, 1971 | Joey Bishop (guest host), Chuck Connors, Joe Frazier, Luci Baines Johnson, Allan Drake | Carlos Montoya |
| 2166 | March 23, 1971 | Muhammad Ali, Lily Tomlin, Johnny Brown, Rosalind Russell, Bob Kaufman | Della Reese |
| 2167 | March 24, 1971 | Carol Channing, Rodney Dangerfield | Hines, Hines & Dad |
| 2168 | March 25, 1971 | David Steinberg, Jaye P. Morgan, Maureen Stapleton | N/A |
| 2169 | March 26, 1971 | Dr. Paul Ehrlich, Rodney Dangerfield | Bette Midler |
| 2170 | March 29, 1971 | Tony Randall (guest host), Wally Cox, Otto Preminger, Thalassa Cruso | Bernadette Peters, Ezio Flagello |
| 2171 | March 30, 1971 | Vincent Price, Robert Klein, William Rankin | Homer & Jethro |
| 2172 | March 31, 1971 | Rod Steiger, Joe Frazier, Jack Douglas and wife Reiko | Mac Davis |

=== April ===
| No. | Original release date | Guest(s) | Musical/entertainment guest(s) |
|---|---|---|---|
| 2173 | April 1, 1971 | Albert Brooks, Diana Rigg, Herschel Bernardi | Hines, Hines and Dad |
| 2174 | April 2, 1971 | Joe Namath, Ellen Peck, Burt Reynolds, Michele Carey | The New Christy Minstrels |
| 2175 | April 5, 1971 | Joan Rivers (guest host), Myron Cohen | Karen Morrow, Sandler & Young |
| 2176 | April 6, 1971 | Sandy Baron, Phyllis George, Charlie Callas, Dr. David Reuben | N/A |
| 2177 | April 7, 1971 | Truman Capote, Joseph Wambaugh, Robert Fabian | Lana Cantrell |
| 2178 | April 8, 1971 | James Coco, Carol Wayne | Sergio Franchi |
| 2179 | April 9, 1971 | Lauren Bacall, David Brenner, Walter Slezak, Dr. Benjamin Spock | N/A |
| 2180 | April 12, 1971 | David Steinberg (guest host), Jack Burns, George Segal, Peter Stone | Dionne Warwick |
| 2181 | April 13, 1971 | Chief Red Fox, Beth Howland, Susan Browning | Donna McKechnie, Larry Kert, Phyllis Newman |
| 2182 | April 14, 1971 | Burt Reynolds, Elaine Stritch, Sandy Baron, Milt Moss | Buddy Rich |
| 2183 | April 16, 1971 | Michael Douglas | Helen Reddy, Ace Trucking Company |
| 2184 | April 19, 1971 | Joey Bishop (guest host), Don Rickles, Frank Gorshin | Alice Faye, Billy Daniels |
| 2185 | April 20, 1971 | Joey Bishop (guest host), Corbett Monica, Phil Foster, Fifi D'Orsay | James Brown |
| 2186 | April 21, 1971 | Joey Bishop (guest host), Ashley Montagu, Shelley Berman | Romina Power |
| 2187 | April 22, 1971 | Joey Bishop (guest host), Phil Silvers, Vonda Kay Van Dyke | Lillian Roth, Ronnie Dyson |
| 2188 | April 23, 1971 | Joey Bishop (guest host), Don Rickles, Tony Darrow, Sharon Farrell, Nipsey Russell | Nitty Gritty Dirt Band |
| 2189 | April 26, 1971 | Joey Bishop (guest host), Sally Struthers, Pete Barbutti, Kreskin, Joe Frazier, Debbie Drake, Jerzy Kosinski | N/A |
| 2190 | April 27, 1971 | Joey Bishop (guest host), George Kirby, Helen Gurley Brown, Jackie Kahane | Wayne Newton, Charo |
| 2191 | April 28, 1971 | Don Rickles, Louise Lasser, Leonard Frey | Little Richard, Melba Moore |
| 2192 | April 29, 1971 | Rodney Dangerfield, Jerzy Kosinski | Jose Feliciano |
| 2193 | April 30, 1971 | Robert Klein, Charlie Manna, Jack Douglas and wife Reiko | Sunday's Child |

=== May ===
| No. | Original release date | Guest(s) | Musical/entertainment guest(s) |
|---|---|---|---|
| 2194 | May 3, 1971 | David Brenner, Jack Cassidy, Sarah Miles, Gunther Gebel-Williams | N/A |
| 2195 | May 4, 1971 | David Frost | N/A |
| 2196 | May 5, 1971 | Joe Namath (guest host), Ellen Peck, Jerry Stiller, Anne Meara, Tina Kaplan | The Supremes |
| 2197 | May 6, 1971 | Woody Allen (guest host), Bob Hope, James Coco, Dr. Irwin Maxwell Stillman, Chief Red Fox, Kaye Hart | N/A |
| 2198 | May 7, 1971 | Woody Allen (guest host), Muhammad Ali, Dr. Joyce Brothers, Diane Keaton, Chief Red Fox, Ken Coleman | N/A |
| 2199 | May 10, 1971 | Redd Foxx, Walter Matthau, Joan Rivers, Carol Wayne | Dana Valery, Sergio Franchi |
| 2200 | May 11, 1971 | Shecky Greene, Joey Bishop | Della Reese |
| 2201 | May 12, 1971 | James Stewart, Jo Anne Worley | Mel Torme |
| 2202 | May 13, 1971 | Ernest Borgnine, Sally Struthers, Art Metrano | Johnny Mathis |
| 2203 | May 14, 1971 | Jack Benny, Albert Brooks, Jerry Lucas | Vikki Carr |
| 2204 | May 17, 1971 | John Byner, Carl Reiner, Ruth Gordon | Lou Rawls |
| 2205 | May 18, 1971 | Bob Hope, George Gobel, Jaye P. Morgan, Gig Young | Kaye Ballard |
| 2206 | May 19, 1971 | George Burns, Janet Leigh, Suzanne Pleshette, Sammy Davis Jr., Altovise Davis | Al Hirt, Don Ho |
| 2207 | May 20, 1971 | Sammy Davis Jr., Norm Crosby, Phyllis Diller | Jack Jones, Nancy Wilson |
| 2208 | May 21, 1971 | Lucille Ball, Debbie Reynolds, Johnny Brown | N/A |
| 2209 | May 24, 1971 | Joan Rivers | Frankie Avalon |
| 2210 | May 25, 1971 | Albert Brooks, Des O'Connor | Phyllis Newman |
| 2211 | May 26, 1971 | Mickey Rooney | Chet Atkins, Mac Davis |
| 2212 | May 27, 1971 | Charlie Callas, Sharon Farrell, Rodney Dangerfield | Liz Torres, Fanny (band) |
| 2213 | May 28, 1971 | James Coco, Gene Nelson, Janie Sell | N/A |
| 2214 | May 31, 1971 | Burt Reynolds (guest host), Doug McClure, Stella Stevens, Don Meredith | Bobby Goldsboro, Patti Austin |

=== June ===
| No. | Original release date | Guest(s) | Musical/entertainment guest(s) |
|---|---|---|---|
| 2215 | June 1, 1971 | David Steinberg, Cliff Gorman | Pete Townshend, Los Indios Tabajaras |
| 2216 | June 2, 1971 | Roddy McDowall, Kim Hunter, Jack Douglas and wife Reiko | Carly Simon, Ace Trucking Company |
| 2217 | June 3, 1971 | Tom Tryon | Donna Theodore |
| 2218 | June 4, 1971 | Robert Klein, Christopher Mitchum, Patrick Wayne | Buddy Rich, The Lettermen |
| 2219 | June 7, 1971 | David Steinberg (guest host), Muhammad Ali, William Peter Blatty, Selma Diamond | Paul Simon |
| 2220 | June 8, 1971 | David Hemmings, Julie Ege, Alan King | Larry Kert |
| 2221 | June 9, 1971 | David Brenner, Dustin Hoffman, George Axelrod | Gerri Granger |
| 2222 | June 10, 1971 | George Carlin, Chief Red Fox | Larry Kert, Los Indios Tabajaras |
| 2223 | June 11, 1971 | Orson Bean, Bob Uecker, Alexis Smith | Frankie Avalon |
| 2224 | June 14, 1971 | Joey Bishop (guest host), Debbie Reynolds, Myron Cohen, June Allyson | The Bells |
| 2225 | June 15, 1971 | Joey Bishop (guest host), Rex Reed | Tiny Tim |
| 2226 | June 16, 1971 | Joey Bishop (guest host), Frank Capra, David Hemmings, Jerry Shane | Melba Moore |
| 2227 | June 17, 1971 | Joey Bishop (guest host), Dom DeLuise, Dr. Irwin Maxwell Stillman, Sam Levenson | George Barnes and Bucky Pizzarelli |
| 2228 | June 18, 1971 | Joey Bishop (guest host), Kreskin | Bette Midler, Enzo Stuarti |
| 2229 | June 21, 1971 | Joey Bishop (guest host), Sandy Baron | Julie Budd |
| 2230 | June 22, 1971 | Joey Bishop (guest host), George Kirby | N/A |
| 2231 | June 23, 1971 | Joey Bishop (guest host), Noel Harrison, Dick Gregory | Marilyn Maye |
| 2232 | June 24, 1971 | Joey Bishop (guest host), Victor Buono, Buffy Sainte-Marie, Corbett Monica | N/A |
| 2233 | June 25, 1971 | Joey Bishop (guest host), Dom DeLuise, Jackie Kahane, Betty Walker | Bobby Goldsboro |
| 2234 | June 28, 1971 | Buddy Hackett, Bill Dana | Sandler & Young |
| 2235 | June 29, 1971 | Ed Sullivan, Robert Klein, Polly Bergen, Jerzy Kosinski | Buddy Rich, Lucky Peterson |
| 2236 | June 30, 1971 | Jaye P. Morgan, Gail Parent, Kenny Solms | The Carpenters |

=== July ===
| No. | Original release date | Guest(s) | Musical/entertainment guest(s) |
|---|---|---|---|
| 2237 | July 1, 1971 | Rodney Dangerfield, Jerzy Kosinski | Della Reese, Freeway (band) |
| 2238 | July 2, 1971 | Bob Hope, Carol Lawrence, Selma Diamond, Godfrey Cambridge, Bob Melvin | Irene Cara |
| 2239 | July 5, 1971 | Joan Rivers (guest host), James Coco, Hugh O'Brian, Stan Kann | N/A |
| 2240 | July 6, 1971 | Albert Brooks, Truman Capote, Louise Lasser | N/A |
| 2241 | July 7, 1971 | Art Metrano, Dr. Irwin Maxwell Stillman | Luiz Bonfa, Lynn Anderson |
| 2242 | July 8, 1971 | Abie Grossfeld | Larry Kert, Marilyn Horne, Yvonne Constant |
| 2243 | July 9, 1971 | Yvonne Constant, Yvonne de Carlo | Helen Reddy, Ace Trucking Company |
| 2244 | July 12, 1971 | Phyllis Diller (guest host), Dr. Lendon Smith | Charo |
| 2245 | July 13, 1971 | Dom DeLuise, Ashley Montagu, Richard Roundtree | Genya Ravan, Luiz Bonfa |
| 2246 | July 14, 1971 | James Coco, Norm Crosby, Richard Roundtree | The Cowsills, Los Indios Tabajaras |
| 2247 | July 15, 1971 | Gig Young, Sharon Farrell, Gael Greene | Liz Torres |
| 2248 | July 16, 1971 | Redd Foxx | N/A |
| 2249 | July 19, 1971 | Joey Bishop (guest host), London Lee | N/A |
| 2250 | July 20, 1971 | Joey Bishop (guest host), Lee Trevino, Irwin C. Watson | Dana Valery |
| 2251 | July 21, 1971 | Joey Bishop (guest host), Joe Frazier, Eva Gabor, Bob Uecker, Charo | N/A |
| 2252 | July 22, 1971 | Joey Bishop (guest host), Victor Buono, Anne Baxter, Corbett Monica, Dr. Irwin Maxwell Stillman | N/A |
| 2253 | July 23, 1971 | Joey Bishop (guest host), Rex Reed, Louisa Moritz, Stan Kann | Troy Donahue |
Note: This was the episode where Louisa Moritz claimed to have been raped by Bill Cosby backstage. She claimed that her alleged incident with Cosby happened in 1971.
| 2254 | July 26, 1971 | Alan King (guest host), Barbara Walters, Max Shulman, Judith Lowry | Eloise Laws |
| 2255 | July 27, 1971 | Rodney Dangerfield, Billy de Wolfe | Mac Davis |
| 2256 | July 28, 1971 | George Carlin, Jack Cassidy, Ashley Montagu | N/A |
| 2257 | July 29, 1971 | David Brenner | Bobby Goldsboro |
| 2258 | July 30, 1971 | Dom DeLuise, Mr. Blackwell, Sandy Baron | Karen Morrow |

=== August ===
| No. | Original release date | Guest(s) | Musical/entertainment guest(s) |
|---|---|---|---|
| 2259 | August 2, 1971 | Desi Arnaz, George Burns, Cal Worthington, Carol Wayne | The 5th Dimension |
| 2260 | August 3, 1971 | William Holden, Jaye P. Morgan, John Byner, Johnny Brown | Gran Picasso |
| 2261 | August 4, 1971 | Dick Martin, Dan Rowan, Jo Anne Worley | Della Reese |
| 2262 | August 5, 1971 | Bob Newhart, Suzanne Pleshette, Dick Gregory | Ike & Tina Turner |
| 2263 | August 6, 1971 | Albert Brooks, Rob Reiner | Pat Boone |
| 2264 | August 9, 1971 | Karen Valentine, John McGiver, John Phillip Law, Joe Gerlach | Dionne Warwick |
| 2265 | August 10, 1971 | Bob Hope, Flip Wilson, David Steinberg | Mel Torme, Vikki Carr |
| 2266 | August 11, 1971 | Ray Milland | Abbe Lane |
| 2267 | August 12, 1971 | Sally Struthers, Burt Reynolds, Joan Blondell, Stanley Kramer | Johnny Mathis |
| 2268 | August 13, 1971 | Gene Kelly, Lily Tomlin | N/A |
| 2269 | August 16, 1971 | Lucille Ball, Broderick Crawford, Victor Buono | Kaye Ballard |
| 2270 | August 17, 1971 | Bob Newhart, Dan Rowan, Dick Martin, Don Adams, Charles Nelson Reilly | Barbara McNair |
| 2271 | August 18, 1971 | Charlton Heston, George Carlin, Sally Kellerman | Glen Campbell, Joe Williams |
| 2272 | August 19, 1971 | Kirk Douglas, Dennis Weaver | Roger Miller, The Carpenters |
| 2273 | August 20, 1971 | Ernest Borgnine, George Gobel, Fernando Lamas, Juliet Prowse | Roger Miller |
Sketch- "Tea-Time Movie"
| 2274 | August 23, 1971 | Bob Crane, Nipsey Russell | N/A |
| 2275 | August 24, 1971 | Selma Diamond, Amy Vanderbilt | The Bells, Tommy Leonetti |
| 2276 | August 25, 1971 | Bob Uecker, Jackie Kahane | Enzo Stuarti, Hines, Hines and Dad |
| 2277 | August 26, 1971 | Joey Bishop (guest host), Kreskin | Eloise Laws |
| 2278 | August 27, 1971 | Joey Bishop (guest host), Frank Sinatra Jr., Rosey Grier, Milt Kamen | Kaye Stevens |
| 2279 | August 30, 1971 | Joey Bishop (guest host), Lee Meredith | Bobby Goldsboro |
| 2280 | August 31, 1971 | Joey Bishop (guest host), Leonard Barr, Noel Harrison, Linda Bennett | N/A |

=== September ===
| No. | Original release date | Guest(s) | Musical/entertainment guest(s) |
|---|---|---|---|
| 2281 | September 1, 1971 | Joey Bishop (guest host) | N/A |
| 2282 | September 2, 1971 | Joey Bishop (guest host), Dennis Weaver, Corbett Monica, Mamie Van Doren, Stanley Myron Handelman | Karen Morrow |
| 2283 | September 3, 1971 | Joey Bishop (guest host), Mary Ann Mobley, Gary Collins, Pat Henry | Aretha Franklin, Karen Morrow, Sonny King |
| 2284 | September 6, 1971 | George Carlin, John McGiver, Bobby Alto, Jaye P. Morgan, Jerzy Kosinski | N/A |
| 2285 | September 7, 1971 | John Byner | Bee Gees, Bernadette Peters, Monti Rock |
| 2286 | September 8, 1971 | Dr. Irwin Maxwell Stillman, Godfrey Cambridge, Jack Douglas and wife Reiko | Connie Francis |
| 2287 | September 9, 1971 | Rich Little, Rodney Dangerfield | N/A |
| 2288 | September 10, 1971 | Jo Anne Worley | Artie Shaw |
| 2289 | September 13, 1971 | Burt Reynolds (guest host), Jake La Motta, Laurie Lea Schaefer, Alex Karras, Kreskin | Charo |
| 2290 | September 14, 1971 | Dr. Irwin Maxwell Stillman, Nancy Grigor, Dr. David Reuben | Lana Cantrell |
| 2291 | September 15, 1971 | David Brenner, Luciana Paluzzi | Phyllis Newman, Tiny Tim |
| 2292 | September 16, 1971 | Dinah Shore, Victor Buono | N/A |
| 2293 | September 17, 1971 | Mickey Rooney, Robert Klein, Sharon Farrell, Dr. Julius Segal | Martina Arroyo |
| 2294 | September 20, 1971 | Joan Rivers (guest host), James Coco, Ginger Rogers, Stan Kann, Lucie Arnaz, George Maharis | N/A |
| 2295 | September 21, 1971 | Minnesota Fats, Frederick Forsyth | N/A |
| 2296 | September 22, 1971 | Charlie Callas | N/A |
| 2297 | September 23, 1971 | Bob Uecker, Hans Conried | Beverly Sills, Della Reese |
| 2298 | September 24, 1971 | Burt Reynolds, Albert Brooks, Linda Bennett | Buddy Rich |
| 2299 | September 27, 1971 | Totie Fields (guest host) | Leslie Uggams |
| 2300 | September 28, 1971 | Paul Harvey, Louise Lasser | Dick Haymes, Joe Williams, Larry Kert |
| 2301 | September 29, 1971 | Alex Karras, Jaye P. Morgan, William Peter Blatty | Mac Davis |
| 2302 | September 30, 1971 | Truman Capote, Peter Fonda, John Davidson, Ronnie Schell | N/A |

=== October ===
| No. | Original release date | Guest(s) | Musical/entertainment guest(s) |
|---|---|---|---|
| 2303 | October 1, 1971 | Mayor John Lindsay | N/A |
| 2304 | October 4, 1971 | Burt Reynolds (guest host), Bob Uecker, Leonard Frey, Helen Gurley Brown, Bob Lurtsema, Judy Carne | Jose Molina, Artie Shaw |
| 2305 | October 5, 1971 | Wally Hickel, Charlie Callas, Roland Lakes, Jim Files, Bob Lurtsema, Carol Lawrence | Robert Goulet |
Carnac the Magnificent
| 2306 | October 6, 1971 | Dr. Irwin Maxwell Stillman, Fifi D'Orsay | Bobby Goldsboro |
| 2307 | October 7, 1971 | George Carlin, Richard Crenna | Bette Midler, Buddy Rich |
| 2308 | October 8, 1971 | Lawrence Welk, Jerry Baker, Dick Gregory | Shirley Bassey |
| 2309 | October 11, 1971 | Steve Allen (guest host), Jayne Meadows, Bob Einstein, Amy Vanderbilt | Larry Kert, Victor Borge |
| 2310 | October 12, 1971 | Sam Blotner | Erroll Garner |
| 2311 | October 13, 1971 | Karen Black, David Steinberg, Paul Williams, Ronald Sarro | N/A |
| 2312 | October 14, 1971 | Jo Anne Worley | Artie Shaw |
| 2313 | October 15, 1971 | Jack Benny | N/A |
| 2314 | October 18, 1971 | Joey Bishop (guest host), Heywood Hale Broun, Myron Cohen | Hines, Hines and Dad |
| 2315 | October 19, 1971 | Joey Bishop (guest host), Bill Cosby, Sam Levenson, Gay Talese | Jose Molina, Buddy Greco |
| 2316 | October 20, 1971 | Joey Bishop (guest host), Sammy Davis Jr., Mickey Manners, Chief Red Fox, Ginger Rogers, Bob Melvin | Gerri Granger |
| 2317 | October 21, 1971 | Joey Bishop (guest host), Lana Wood, John Forsythe, Nipsey Russell | Peter Lemongello |
| 2318 | October 22, 1971 | Joey Bishop (guest host), Rex Reed, Melina Mercouri | Jack Jones |
| 2319 | October 25, 1971 | James Caan | Charles Aznavour |
| 2320 | October 26, 1971 | Victor Buono, Rich Little, Corbett Monica, William F. Buckley Jr. | Ace Trucking Company |
| 2321 | October 27, 1971 | Jane Goodall, Louise Lasser | Marilyn Maye |
| 2322 | October 28, 1971 | Clint Eastwood | N/A |
| 2323 | October 29, 1971 | Joan Rivers (guest host), William Peter Blatty, Sandy Baron | Hines, Hines and Dad |

=== November ===
| No. | Original release date | Guest(s) | Musical/entertainment guest(s) |
|---|---|---|---|
| 2324 | November 1, 1971 | Buddy Hackett, Carol Wayne | N/A |
| 2325 | November 2, 1971 | James Garner, Sammy Davis Jr., Karen Valentine, Dom DeLuise | N/A |
| 2326 | November 3, 1971 | Jack Benny, Lynn Redgrave, Fernando Lamas | Bill Withers |
| 2327 | November 4, 1971 | Jack Lemmon, Mel Blanc, Barbara Feldon, Billy de Wolfe, Alan Reed | Roy Clark |
| 2328 | November 5, 1971 | Joan Embery, George Carlin, Cliff Robertson, Suzanne Pleshette | The Carpenters |
| 2329 | November 8, 1971 | Lucille Ball, Mickey Rooney, Jack Cassidy, Jaye P. Morgan, Jo Ann Pflug | Don Ho |
| 2330 | November 9, 1971 | Vincent Price, Lawrence Welk, George Carlin | N/A |
| 2331 | November 10, 1971 | Gene Kelly, Elke Sommer, Shecky Greene | Ike & Tina Turner, Lola Falana |
| 2332 | November 11, 1971 | Rob Reiner | N/A |
| 2333 | November 12, 1971 | George Burns, Juliet Prowse, James Caan, Ray Berwick, Jim Bailey | Lola Falana |
| 2334 | November 15, 1971 | Suzanne Pleshette, Bill Shoemaker | Beverly Sills, Connie Stevens |
| 2335 | November 16, 1971 | Richard Harris, Albert Brooks | Anne Murray, Glen Campbell |
| 2336 | November 17, 1971 | Dan Rowan, Dick Martin, Jo Anne Worley, Perkins Harnly | Robert Goulet, Vikki Carr |
| 2337 | November 18, 1971 | Danny Thomas, Don Rickles, Jennifer O'Neill, James Coburn | Caterina Valente, Kaye Ballard |
| 2338 | November 19, 1971 | Fernando Lamas, Karen Valentine, Laurence Harvey, Paul Williams | Della Reese, Peter Nero |
| 2339 | November 22, 1971 | Robert Shaw, Shelley Winters | George Barnes and Bucky Pizzarelli |
| 2340 | November 23, 1971 | William Peter Blatty, Myron Cohen | Phyllis Newman, George Barnes and Bucky Pizzarelli |
| 2341 | November 24, 1971 | Muhammad Ali, Kreskin, Rodney Dangerfield | Mac Davis |
| 2342 | November 25, 1971 | Robert Klein, Dr. Irwin Maxwell Stillman | Tommy Leonetti |
| 2343 | November 26, 1971 | Della Reese (guest host), June Allyson, Leonard Frey, Charles Nelson Reilly, Minnie Pearl, Vic Perry | N/A |
| 2344 | November 29, 1971 | Robert Klein (guest host), Brenda Vaccaro, Fred Willard | Bernadette Peters, Freda Payne |
| 2345 | November 30, 1971 | David Brenner, Fernando Lamas, Pete Hamill, Justin de Villeneuve, Twiggy | Roy Clark |

=== December ===
| No. | Original release date | Guest(s) | Musical/entertainment guest(s) |
|---|---|---|---|
| 2346 | December 1, 1971 | Charlie Callas | Dennis Day, Los Indios Tabajaras |
| 2347 | December 2, 1971 | TBA | N/A |
| 2348 | December 3, 1971 | Rod Steiger, Otto Preminger | Larry Kert, Martina Arroyo |
| 2349 | December 6, 1971 | Pearl Bailey (guest host), Maya Angelou | Edie Adams, Sandler & Young |
| 2350 | December 7, 1971 | Roger Moore, Jane Goodall, Lee Trevino | James Brown, Los Indios Tabajaras |
| 2351 | December 8, 1971 | Jennifer O'Neill, Orson Bean | N/A |
| 2352 | December 10, 1971 | Jaye P. Morgan, Garson Kanin | Honey Cone, Monti Rock |
| 2353 | December 13, 1971 | David Steinberg (guest host), Amy Vanderbilt, Carol Lynley, David Frye | N/A |
| 2354 | December 14, 1971 | Robert Shaw, Paul Williams | Helen Reddy, Phyllis Newman |
| 2355 | December 15, 1971 | Paul Williams, Dr. David Reuben | N/A |
| 2356 | December 16, 1971 | Cloris Leachman, Ruth Gordon | Peter Nero, Vikki Carr, Ace Trucking Company |
| 2357 | December 17, 1971 | George Carlin, Dr. Paul Ehrlich | Bobby Goldsboro |
| 2358 | December 20, 1971 | Joey Bishop (guest host), Gwen Davis | Jose Molina, Enzo Stuarti |
| 2359 | December 21, 1971 | Joey Bishop (guest host), Leonard Barr, Francesca Annis, Phil Foster | Gerri Granger |
| 2360 | December 22, 1971 | Joey Bishop (guest host), John Carradine, Jackie Kahane, Jack Douglas and wife Reiko, Rex Reed | Martina Arroyo |
| 2361 | December 23, 1971 | Joey Bishop (guest host), Sam Levenson, Gena Rowlands, John Cassavetes | Gerri Granger |
| 2362 | December 27, 1971 | Joan Rivers, Tony Randall | Ethel Ennis, Larry Kert |
| 2363 | December 28, 1971 | Prof. Julius Sumner Miller, John McGiver, Alexis Smith, Craig Stevens | N/A |
| 2364 | December 29, 1971 | George Carlin, Sally Struthers, Irving Benson, Julius Sumner Miller, F. Lee Bailey | N/A |
| 2365 | December 30, 1971 | David Steinberg, Steve Landesberg, Elaine Stritch, Dr. Julius Segal | N/A |
| 2366 | December 31, 1971 | Shecky Greene, Rose Marie | N/A |
Mighty Carson Art Players- "Pirate Sketch"
