= Kraft Music Hall (TV series) =

American TV series (1958–1971)

- Genre: Musical variety
- Country of origin: United States
- Original language: English
- No. of seasons: 13

Production
- Production locations: Manhattan, New York City, New York, United States
- Running time: 50 minutes
- Production company: Bob Banner Associates

Original release
- Network: NBC
- Release: October 8, 1958 – September 1, 1971

Kraft Music Hall is an umbrella title for several television series aired by NBC in the United States from the 1950s to the 1970s in the musical variety genre, sponsored by Kraft Foods, the producers of a well-known line of cheeses and related dairy products. Their commercials were usually announced by "The Voice of Kraft", Ed Herlihy.

== Original ==
The original Kraft Music Hall was a radio series that aired from 1933 to 1949. It was one of the most popular programs of its type, particularly during the period (1936–1946) when it was hosted by Bing Crosby, then by Al Jolson (1947–1949). However, unlike similar programs, it did not make the transition directly to network television; Kraft's early ventures into that field entailed the sponsorship of a famed series of dramas, initially broadcast live, under the title Kraft Television Theatre.

== 1950s ==
By 1958, Kraft was prepared to revive the Music Hall for television. The first host was "Mr. Television" Milton Berle, who had become television's first superstar by hosting earlier NBC programs Texaco Star Theater and The Buick-Berle Show. An alternate summer host in the program's early period was English comedian and singer Dave King. The program achieved its greatest success with Perry Como hosting weekly between 1959 and 1963. Four seasons of Como Kraft specials followed until 1967.

In February 2024, it was revealed that a complete colour tape recording of the first Music Hall with Milton Berle, aired October 8, 1958, had been recovered at his estate, making it the oldest surviving entertainment show in original colour. The quad tape was made from the broadcast feed, and included the closing moments of that evening's The Price Is Right (thus marking the first known surviving colour footage of the Bill Cullen incarnation), and a short promo for the premiere of Bat Masterson, also airing that same night.

== 1960s ==
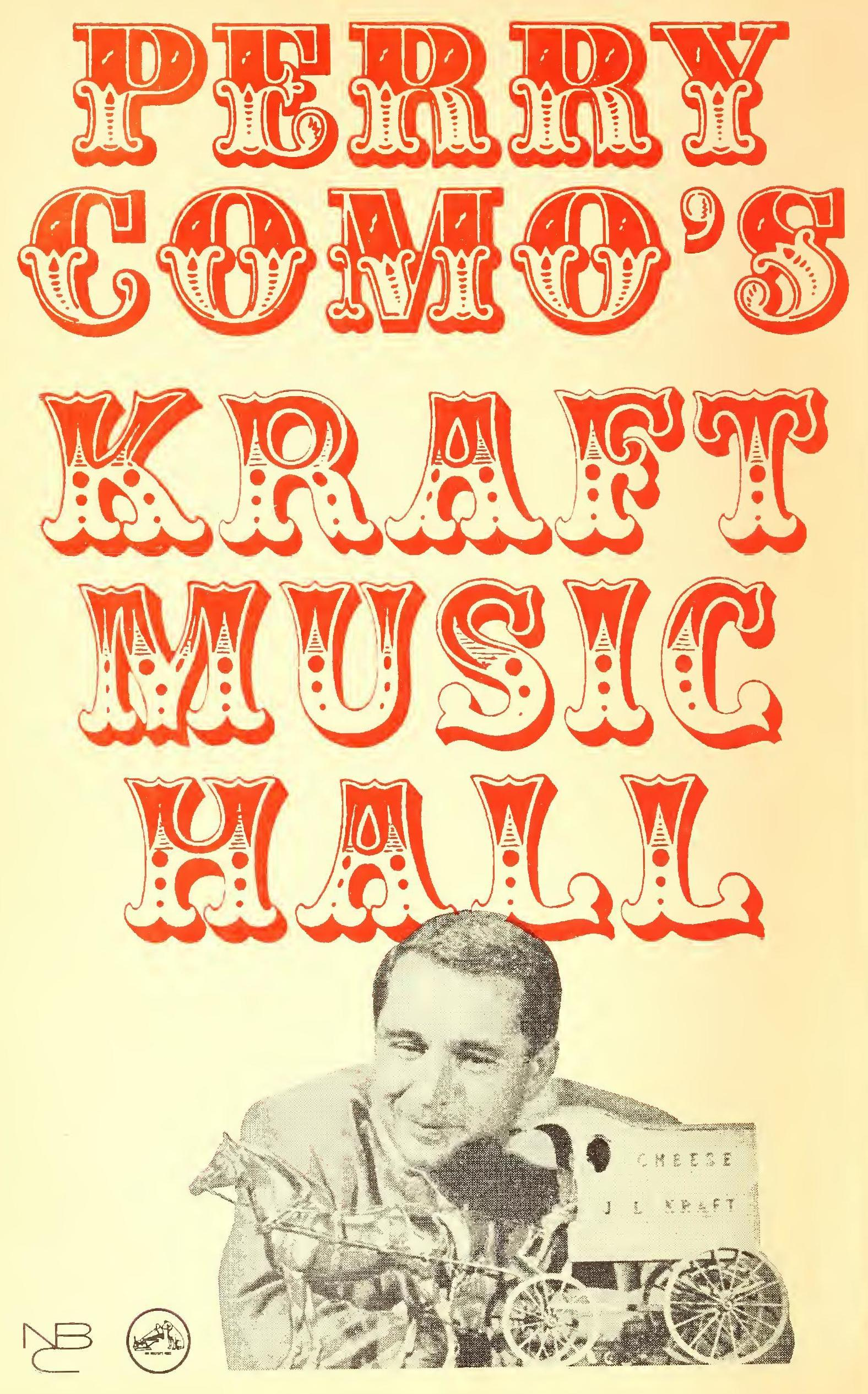
"Perry Como's Kraft Music Hall" ad in the Radio Annual and Television Year Book, 1964

Beginning in 1963, Kraft Music Hall specials hosted by Como were presented about once a month, through 1967. During the 1963-64 and 1964-65 television seasons, Kraft Suspense Theatre (co-produced by Como's "Roncom Films") was broadcast in the same time slot during the remaining weeks.

In 1966, the program was a summer replacement for The Andy Williams Show, known as the Kraft Summer Music Hall, hosted by singer John Davidson and featuring, on a regular basis, comedian George Carlin. In addition, Richard Pryor—then billed as both comic and singer—frequently guested, contributing renditions of Roger Miller's King of the Road and Nobody Knows You When You're Down and Out, among others.

In the fall of 1967, the Kraft Music Hall returned as a weekly series, but without Perry Como who abruptly ended his association with Kraft Foods after the 1966-67 season. A format of rotating guest hosts was implemented, employing some of the leading figures in the U.S. entertainment industry at the time, including Rock Hudson, Lorne Greene, George Burns, Dinah Shore and Woody Allen. In 1968, the practice of regular hosts was reinstated, with programs starring, in succession, country singer Eddy Arnold, John Davidson (again) and Ed McMahon. Arnold's programs all featured an appearance by comedian/impressionist John Byner, and Mark Andrews.

Other leading performers who appeared on the Kraft Music Hall on a reasonably frequent basis were Don Rickles, Alan King, Steve Lawrence and Eydie Gorme, Mitzi Gaynor, Bobby Darin, Pierre Olaf, Roy Rogers and Dale Evans, Wayne Newton, Johnny Cash and Simon & Garfunkel.

=== Taping ===
The series in the late 1960s and early 1970s was recorded at the NBC studio in Midwood, Brooklyn, New York, at Avenue M and East 14th Street. A show with Rickles was partly taped on Avenue M and the Avenue M station of the BMT subway line, less than two blocks away.

== Country Music Association Awards ==
The 1968 telecast of the Country Music Association Awards (the first installment of the CMA Awards to be televised) was presented as an episode of the Kraft Music Hall.

"From 1968 through 1987, the Country Music Awards were broadcast as part of the series, and from 1969 through 1987, the company was a co-sponsor of America's Junior Miss Program."

== Friars' Club roasts ==
The earliest (1969—1971) telecasts of the Friars' Club roasts, were presented as episodes of the Kraft Music Hall. Johnny Carson, Milton Berle, Jack Benny, Don Rickles, and Jerry Lewis were roasted.

Similar roasts later became a regular feature of The Dean Martin Show in 1974, followed by The Dean Martin Celebrity Roast, from 1974 to 1984.

== Summer hosts ==
Summer hosts during this late period of the show included Britons. In the summer of 1969 - from May 14 till Aug 13th - Tony Sandler and Ralph Young, a.k.a. Sandler and Young hosted the NBC show for 13 weeks from London.

Some other programs that summer were hosted by Don Ho and Des O'Connor in 1970 and 1971; the Des O'Connor shows were originally broadcast in the United Kingdom on ITV as the seventh series (seventh season) of The Des O'Connor Show, which ran from 1963 to 1973.

== Constants ==
Despite the variety of casts and formats employed by the program over the years, there were some constants as well. Longtime Kraft announcer Herlihy voiced all but the summer programs, and the Peter Matz orchestra provided most of the music and, again with the exception of the summer shows, Peter Gennaro was the choreographer.
