= Robert L. Spencer =

American fashion designer

Robert L. Spencer (1920–2014) was an American fashion designer, best known as longtime partner of Richard Blackwell for nearly 60 years.

Spencer was born in 1920 in Indianapolis. During the 1950s, Spencer took up professional hairdressing and became a hairdresser in Beverley Hills. He was a dear friend of actors Cary Grant and Randolph Scott, and even finalized their hair in certain movies. While visiting Spencer, Grant and Scott introduced Richard Blackwell to Spencer. Soon after, the pair established the first Blackwell fashion company in 1958. As Spencer and Blackwell became more popular throughout Los Angeles, Spencer produced the Blackwell's ABC Radio show and The Mr. Blackwell Show in 1964. Throughout the entire 60s, 70s and 80s, Spencer and Blackwell designed clothing for many celebrities, including Elizabeth Taylor, Mae West, Nancy Reagan and Jane Russell. Once Blackwell had died in 2008, he gave away Blackwell's last and final designed dress to Kate Linder. Spencer died from a heart attack in Los Angeles on March 1, 2014, aged 94.
