= Ralph Young (singer) =

American singer (1918–2008)

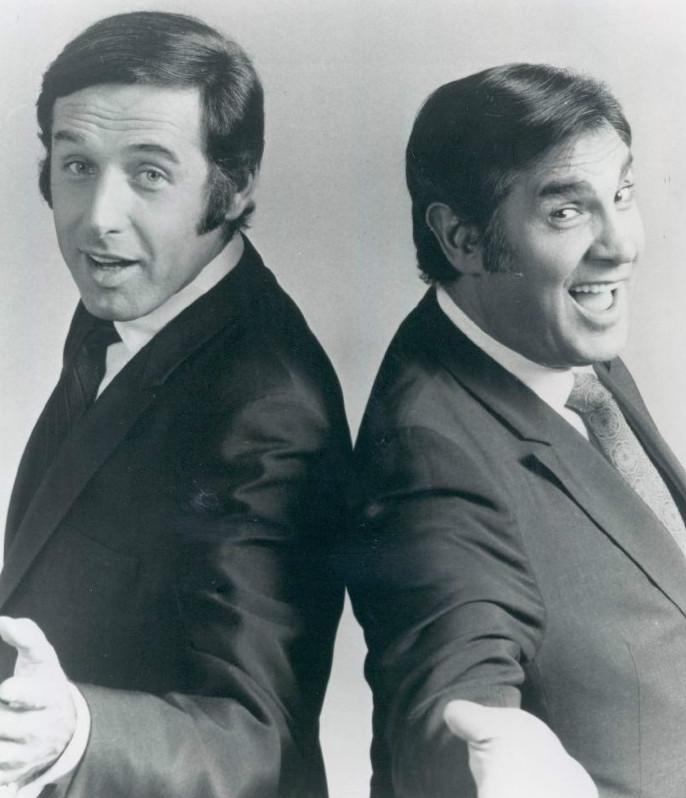
- Tony Sandler and Young (right) in 1970
- Born: July 1, 1918; New York City, New York
- Died: August 22, 2008 (aged 90); Palm Springs, California
- Resting place: Desert Memorial Park, Cathedral City, California
- Occupation: Singer

Ralph Young (July 1, 1918 – August 22, 2008) was an American singer and actor. He was best known as the singing partner of Belgian-born Tony Sandler in the duo of Sandler and Young.

Born and raised in New York, Young teamed with Sandler in the 1960s. The tuxedo-clad pair headlined major hotel and casino showrooms in both the United States and abroad, and made countless guest appearances on top-rated television variety shows. They released 22 albums, sometimes singing songs in both English and French, Italian, German or Flemish (Sandler's native tongue from Flanders Belgium).

Young retired at age 65 to spend more time with his family, a wife, Arlene, and their children, Neil, Arleen, Guy, Lauren, Rachel. Sandler, who was 16 years younger, continued to perform, and the two occasionally reunited for concerts, the last one when Young was in his mid-80s in Palm Springs in an All Stars Concert ‘Let Freedom Ring’ in honour of the victims of 9/11. Young died August 22, 2008, at his home in Palm Springs, California, after a brief illness. He was 90. He is buried at Desert Memorial Park in Cathedral City, California.
