= The Round-Up (1920 film) =

1920 film

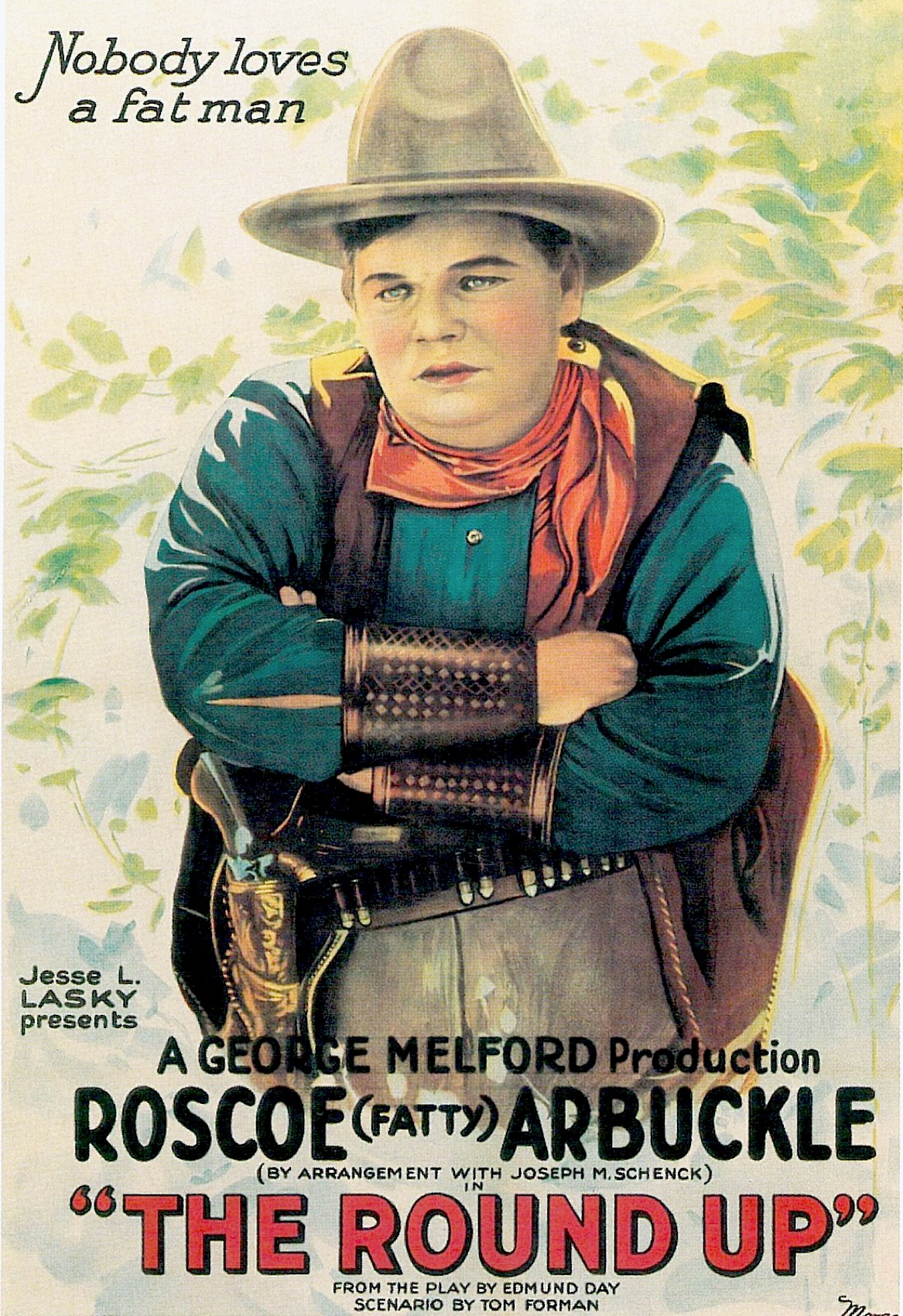
- Movie poster
- Directed by: George Melford
- Written by: Edmund Day (play); Tom Forman
- Produced by: Jesse Lasky
- Starring: Roscoe "Fatty" Arbuckle; Wallace Beery
- Cinematography: Paul P. Perry
- Distributed by: Famous Players–Lasky Corporation
- Release date: October 10, 1920
- Running time: 7 reels
- Country: United States
- Languages: Silent; English intertitles

The Round-Up is a 1920 American silent Western film starring Roscoe "Fatty" Arbuckle and featuring Wallace Beery. The movie was written by Edmund Day and Tom Forman, directed by George Melford, and based on Day's play that was a huge hit for Roscoe Arbuckle's older cousin Macklyn Arbuckle and Julia Dean on the Broadway stage in 1907. It was Macklyn in the play who created the famous phrase used in advertisements of the film, nobody loves a fat man.

Arbuckle was cast as a most unconventional-looking cowboy lead in The Round-Up because the studio didn't want to let their expensive star remain idle while his next comedy was being readied, and the film turned out to be one of Arbuckle's biggest critical successes.

The movie was screened in April and May 2006 as part of a massive 56-film Arbuckle retrospective at the Museum of Modern Art in New York City. The museum chose to take the unprecedented step of running the entire series twice in a row for additional emphasis, once in April and a second time in May.

== Plot ==
The Round-Up (1920)

As described in a film magazine, it is his love for Echo Allen that leads Jack Payson to sacrifice his honor and deceive the girl into believing that her former lover Dick Lane, a prospector, has been killed by Indians. Buck McKee, a half breed desperado, substantiates Jack's tale with an account of Lane's death, fabricated for his own convenience. As the only witness to the scene between Jack and Lane on the night of the latter's unexpected return when Jack was to marry the girl, Buck uses Lane's payment of a mortgage to cast evidence upon him that he was the robber and murderer of a local express agent. However, McKee himself committed the crime. His original lie confessed, Jack is sent by his bride out into the desert to bring Lane back. Sheriff Slim Hoover follows Jack based upon the strength of McKee's accusations. The parties meet on the border in a skirmish between Indian renegades and Mexican mounted police, and all are saved by the coming of the United States cavalry. Lane, however, meets his death with the forgiveness of Jack on his lips. Jack is then restored to the love and favor of Echo.

== Cast ==
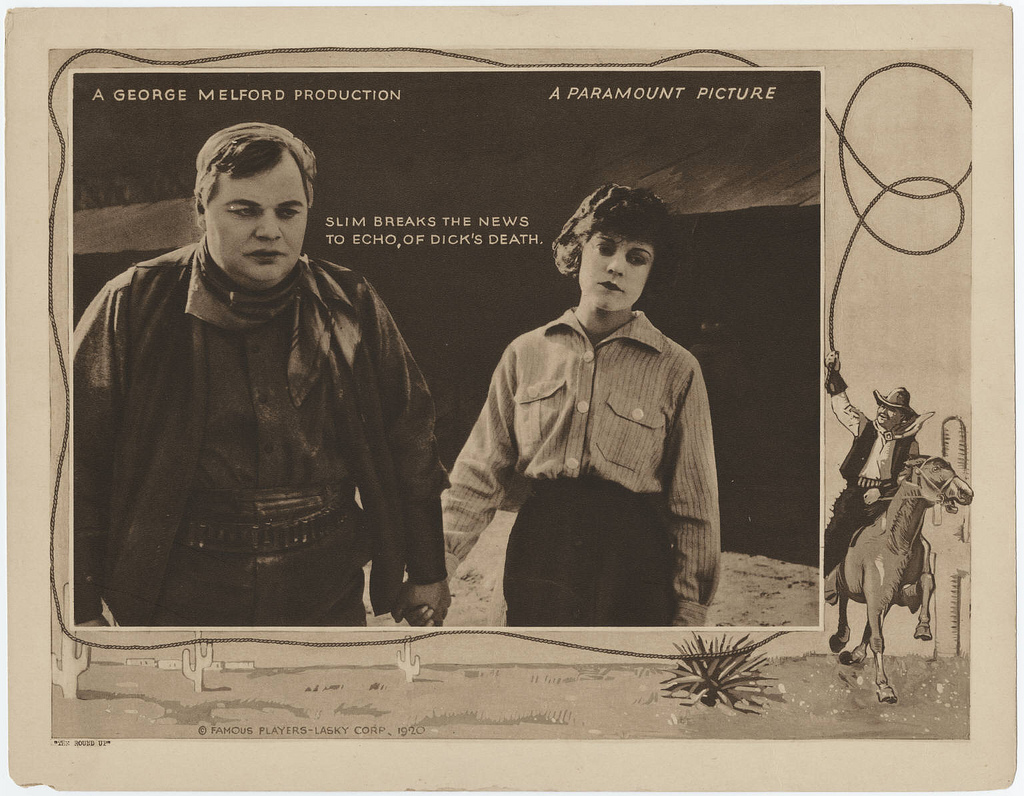
Lobby card: "Slim breaks the news to Echo of Dick's death."

- Roscoe "Fatty" Arbuckle as Slim Hoover
- Mabel Julienne Scott as Echo Allen
- Irving Cummings as Dick Lane
- Tom Forman as Jack Payson
- Wallace Beery as Buck McKee
- Jean Acker as Polly Hope
- A. Edward Sutherland as Bud Lane
- Guy Oliver as Uncle Jim
- Jane Wolfe as Josephine
- Fred Huntley as Sagebrush Charlie
- George Kuwa as Chinese boy
- Lucien Littlefield as Parenthesis
- Chief Red Fox
- Buster Keaton as Indian (uncredited)

== Production ==
Three weeks were spent filming on location at Lone Pine, California.

== See also ==
- List of American films of 1920
- Fatty Arbuckle filmography
- Buster Keaton filmography
