= Professor Backwards =

American comedian

James Edmonson, Sr.
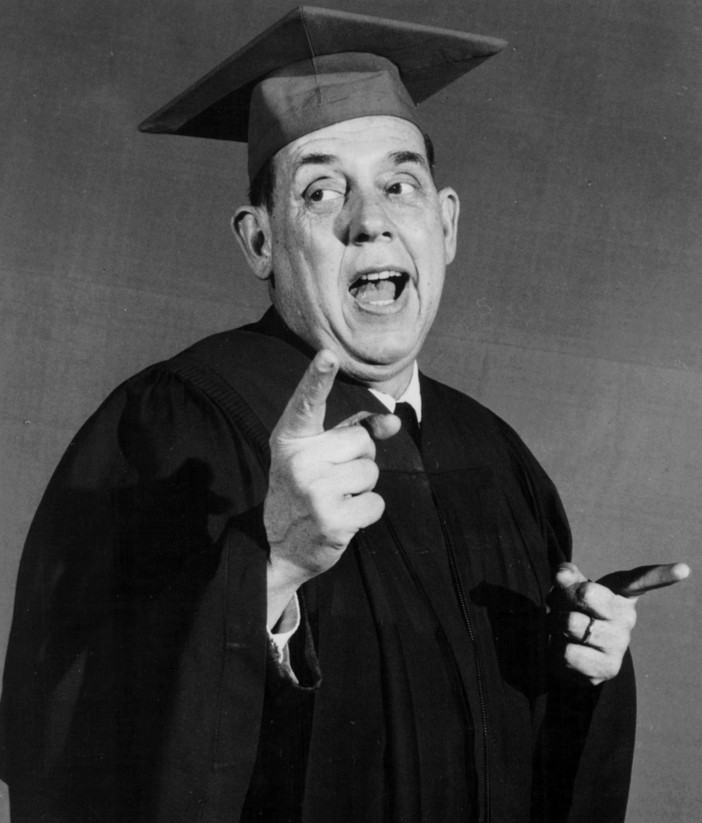
- Edmonson as Professor Backwards.
- Born: June 10, 1910
- Died: January 29, 1976 (aged 65)

Comedy career
- Years active: 1950s - 1976

James Edmondson, Sr. (June 10, 1910 – January 29, 1976), also known as Professor Backwards, was a vaudevillian/comedian who appeared on TV from the 1950s to the early 1970s, most notably on The Ed Sullivan Show, The Tonight Show, The Merv Griffin Show, The Dean Martin Show, and The Mike Douglas Show. In addition to traditional stand-up comedy, Edmondson's act featured his ability to write in script that was upside-down and/or backwards, spell and pronounce words backwards, and read an inverted blackboard correctly.

He was murdered on January 29, 1976, as part of an armed robbery. Three men — 17-year-old Willie Edgar Bell, 19-year-old Roy Anthony Ellerbee, and 23-year-old Michael Gantt — were arrested for the murder. They were all found guilty and sentenced to life in prison plus 20 years for armed robbery.

The three men were paroled in the early 1990s, albeit Bell and Gantt returned to prison for numerous parole violations. Gantt was paroled in 1991 but returned to prison in 1995. He was paroled again in 2001 but returned to prison months later. He was released a third time in 2005 but went back in 2007. He was paroled for the last time in 2008. Bell was paroled in 1990 but returned to prison in 1997. He was paroled again in 2005 but returned to prison in 2023.
