= Perkins Harnly =

American artist (1901–1986)

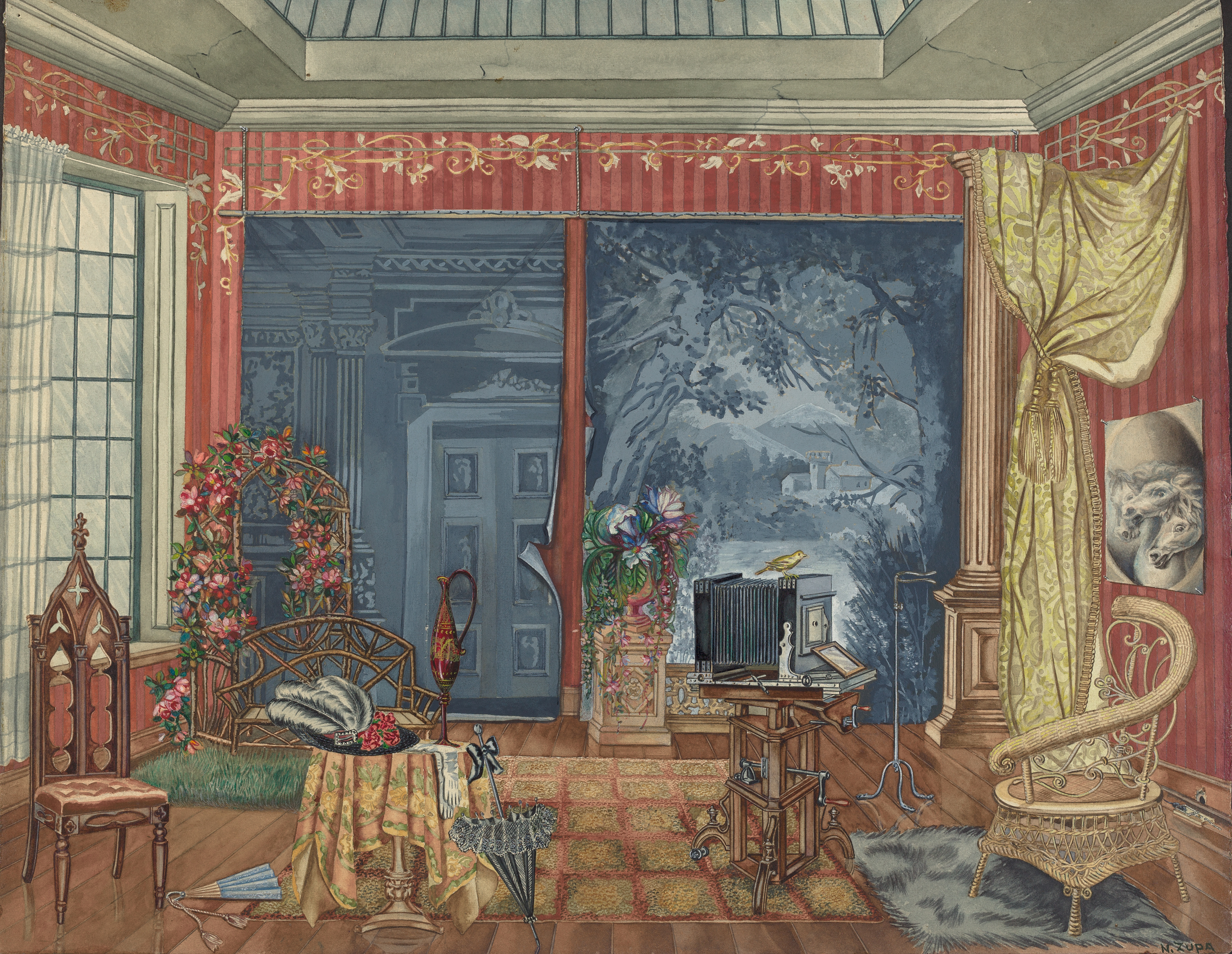
Perkins Harnly and Nicholas Zupa, Photographer's Studio, 1935–1942, NGA 28933

Perkins Harnly and Nicholas Zupa, Conservatory Fountain, c. 1938, National Gallery of Art, Index of American Design

Perkins Harnly (1901–1986) was an artist with the Federal Art Project's Index of American Design. He was born in Ogallala, Nebraska, and traveled to Los Angeles in 1922 and to New York in 1928, where he began painting the watercolors of Victorian interiors that were typical of the work for which he is best known.

Perkins Harnly, Iron Foundry, 1910, 1935-1942, National Gallery of Art, Index of American Design

Harnly's first gallery show was at the Julien Levy Gallery in 1933, with artists Joseph Cornell, Toulouse-Lautrec, and Harry Brown. He began working for the FAP in December, 1935, and then the Index of American Design in 1938. The works in the Index were given by the Federal government to the National Gallery of Art. After the end of the Federal Art Project, the Metropolitan Museum of Art in 1942 mounted an exhibition called I Remember That, composed of works from the Index of American Design with several paintings by Harnly. After seeing his works in this exhibit the film producer Albert Lewin invited Harnly to Hollywood and gave him various assignments, which included set designs for the 1945 film The Picture of Dorian Gray. Lewin later commissioned Harnly to supplement his work with the Index by creating additional paintings, which were then given by Lewin to the National Gallery of Art.

The National Museum of American Art (now the Smithsonian American Art Museum) presented a solo exhibition of Harnly's work from October 16, 1981 to February 15, 1982.

A biography, The Emphatically Queer Career of Artist Perkins Harnly and His Bohemian Friends by Sarah Burns was published by Feral House books in 2021.
