= Jack Douglas (writer) =

American comedy writer (1908–1989)

- Born: Douglas Linley Crickard; July 17, 1908; Lynbrook, New York, U.S.
- Died: January 31, 1989 (aged 80); Los Angeles, California, U.S.
- Occupations: Novelist, short story writer, columnist, actor, television personality, comedian
- Spouses: Reiko Hashimoto (1960–1989 - his death); Marion Hutton (1949–1954 - divorced); Merle Dean Crain (1937–1949 - divorced)
- Children: 5
- Writing career
- Pen name: Jack Douglas
- Period: 1947–1979
- Genre: Comedy
- Notable work: My Brother Was An Only Child

Jack Douglas (born Douglas Linley Crickard, July 17, 1908 – January 31, 1989) was an American comedy writer who wrote for radio and television while additionally writing a series of humor books.

== Radio ==
On radio, he was a writer for Red Skelton, Bob Hope and the situation comedy Tommy Riggs and Betty Lou (1938–46), in which Riggs switched back and forth from his natural baritone to the voice of a seven-year-old girl.

== Television ==
Continuing to write for Skelton and Hope as he moved into television, Douglas also wrote for Jimmy Durante, Bing Crosby, Woody Allen, Johnny Carson, The Adventures of Ozzie and Harriet, The Jack Paar Show, The George Gobel Show and Laugh-In. The producer of Laugh-In, George Schlatter, said, "He saw the world from a different angle than the rest of us. He was not only funny, he was nice." Douglas won an Emmy Award in 1954 for best-written comedy material.

He was best known for his frequent guest appearances on Jack Paar's shows of the late 1950s and early 1960s. On one such appearance, when Douglas was well established as a Paar guest, he was chastised by Paar for holding a stack of file cards with his jokes while talking with Paar. When Paar returned to television in 1973 and was confronted by unexpected low ratings, he engaged Douglas to contribute monologue material by mail. One week, there was no mail from Douglas; but his next package contained a note: "Sorry I didn't send anything last week. I forgot you were on."

Douglas and his third wife Reiko (née Hashimoto), a Japanese-born singer and comedian, were regular guests on shows hosted by Merv Griffin, Dick Cavett and Johnny Carson.

== Humor books ==
By 1959, Douglas' appearances with Paar gave him a huge audience for his humorous memoirs, published by Dutton and Putnam with many mass market paperback editions by Pocket Books and others.

My Brother Was an Only Child, adapted from a book he privately printed in 1947 and sent to 400 of his friends, stayed on the bestseller lists for months in 1959. Some of his books, including Shut Up and Eat Your Snowshoes (1970), were set in Northern Ontario, where Jack and Reiko Douglas lived for several years after purchasing a wilderness lodge on Bird Lake near Killarney Provincial Park in 1968. The town Chinookville in his Northern Ontario books is based on the Ontario city Sudbury. The book The Neighbors Are Scaring My Wolf (1968) was based on his experiences living in New Canaan, Connecticut, while Benedict Arnold Slept Here (1975) recalled the misadventures of the couple while operating their own inn.

Woody Allen, in his 2003 film Anything Else (as his character David Dobel), references one of Douglas' books, Never Trust A Naked Bus Driver. Dobel recalls, "Years ago, Falk, a very wonderful comedy writer, wrote a very funny book with a deep, a really deep and meaningful title. It was called 'Never Trust a Naked Bus Driver.' Now, you would be amazed how many people do exactly that — and worse."

== Published works ==
- No Navel to Guide Him (1947)
- My Brother Was an Only Child (1959)
- Never Trust a Naked Bus Driver (1960)
- A Funny Thing Happened to Me on My Way to the Grave (1962)
- The Adventures of Huckleberry Hashimoto (1964)
- The Neighbors Are Scaring My Wolf (1968)
- Shut Up and Eat Your Snowshoes (1970)
- What Do You Hear from Walden Pond? (1971)
- The Jewish-Japanese Sex and Cook Book and How to Raise Wolves (1972)
- Benedict Arnold Slept Here (1975)
- Going Nuts in Brazil (1977)
- Rubber Duck (1979)

== Personal life ==
Douglas's third wife Reiko Douglas (née Hashimoto) was a Japanese-born singer and comedian. Reiko died of cancer on September 9, 2013, in Los Angeles at age 77.
