= Maxine Weldon =

American soul and jazz singer

Maxine Weldon is an American soul and jazz singer. She is also an actress and live performer. Her brother was actor/director Charles Weldon and one of her sisters is actress/singer Ann Weldon.

Weldon recorded two albums in 1970–71, with members of The Jazz Crusaders playing as session musicians on the recordings. She followed these with Some Singin in 1974, which became her best-selling record, reaching #48 on the Billboard R&B albums chart. Her last album was issued in 1975. In the 1980s and 1990s, she performed frequently but did not record; in 1995–1997 she performed in the Broadway production of Black and Blue and later in the 1990s toured with Linda Hopkins.

== Discography ==
- Right On (Mainstream, 1970)
- Chilly Wind (Mainstream, 1971)
- Some Singin (Monument, 1974)
- Alone on My Own (Monument, 1975)
