= Chief Red Fox =

Native American Lakota Sioux activist and actor (1870–1976)

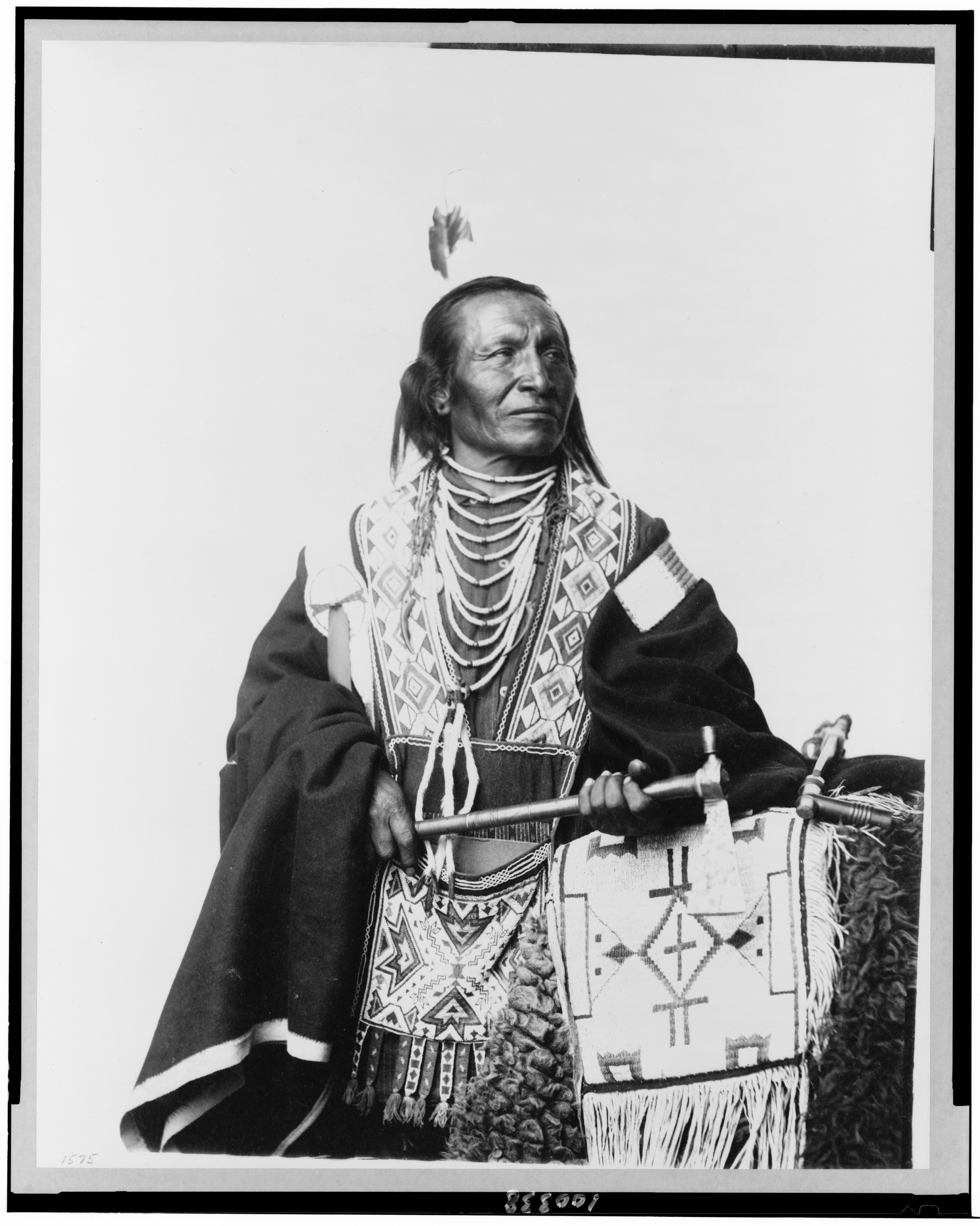

Chief Red Fox (Lakota: Tokála Luta, also known as Chief William Red Fox; June 11, 1870 – March 1, 1976) was an Oglala Lakota Sioux performer, actor, and Sioux Indian rights advocate, born on the Pine Ridge Reservation in the Dakota Territory. He was a nephew of famed Sioux war leader, Crazy Horse. Chief William Red Fox was considered an authority on the historic Little Bighorn massacre. He often recalled the day in 1876 when 4000 of his people left the Dakota Territory for the valley of the Little Bighorn in Montana on a buffalo hunt. He says he was left behind with the women children and old men 10 miles from where Gen. George Custer's detachment was massacred.

== Participation in Buffalo Bill's Wild West show ==
In 1893, Colonel William Frederick Cody, better known as Buffalo Bill, visited Pine Ridge Reservation to recruit Native Americans as performers in his Wild West show. He met Chief Red Fox and asked him to join the troupe of performers who were about to make an appearance at the 1893 World's Columbian Exposition, also known as the Chicago World's Fair. Chief Red Fox was asked to serve as a translator and "have charge" of the Native Americans who were in the troupe. Red Fox agreed and worked for Buffalo Bill for many years, not just translating, but also acting in the show. In 1905, Chief Red Fox "scalped" King Edward VII in a stagecoach robbery scene in a Wild West show performance in London.

== U.S. Navy ==
Chief William Red fox served in the U.S. Navy during the Spanish American War and Boxer Rebellion.

== In popular culture ==
Chief Red Fox appeared in many early silent westerns shown in Nickelodeon movie theaters, most notably The Round Up.

Chief Red Fox appeared in:

- War on the Plains
- When the Heart Calls
- Daughters of the Tribe
- Toll of the Warpath
- Red Fox and Wild Flower
- Perils of the Plains
- Medicine Boy
- The Covered Wagon
- The Vanishing American
- Desert Gold
- The Wild Horse Massacre
- The Flaming Arrow
- The Law of Crippled Creek
- The Round Up
