= The Jack Paar Show =

The Jack Paar Show may refer to:

- The Jack Paar Show (1947), American radio show, a summer replacement for The Jack Benny Program
- The Jack Paar Show (1956, radio), American radio show broadcast by ABC in 1956
- The Jack Paar Show (1956, television), American television show broadcast by CBS in 1956
- Tonight Starring Jack Paar, American television talk show broadcast by NBC (July 29, 1957 to March 30, 1962)
