= Tony Sandler =

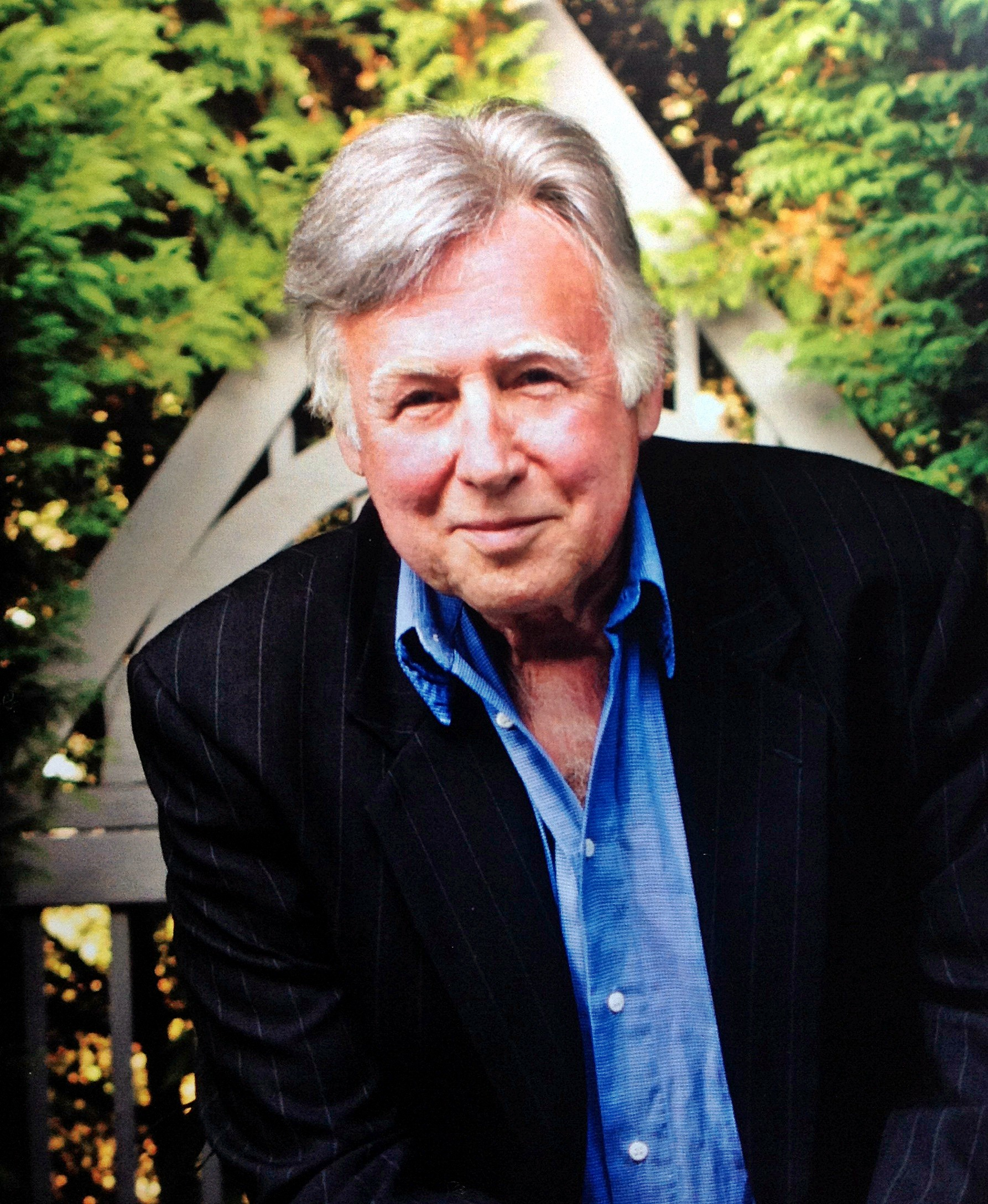
- Sandler in 2012

Background information
- Born: Lucien Joseph Santelé; 18 August 1933 (age 92); Lauwe, Belgium
- Genres: Easy listening, vocal, traditional pop
- Occupations: Singer, actor, theatrical producer
- Labels: Capitol, Balladin Productions, Immure Records, Ralton
- Formerly of: Sandler and Young
- Website: www.sandlerandyoung-legacy.com

Tony Sandler (born Lucien Joseph Santelé, 18 August 1933) is a Belgian singer who was half the vocal duo Sandler and Young, which was popular from the 1960s to the 1980s.

== Europe 1954–1963 ==
Sandler began performing as a boy with the Belgian choir « les petits chanteurs des sept croix » of Mouscron.

In 1954, he recorded his first hit "Song of the Sea" while serving with the Belgian Air Force during the Korean War. He attracted international audiences in Austria, Germany, Switzerland and Britain, and became a stage and television star with dozens of hit records. He also starred in four German/Italian films, including Do Not Send Your Wife to Italy, as well as musical productions.

Sandler then starred and headlined with singing engagements at the 'Roof Garden' of the renowned Café Roma in Alassio on the Italian Riviera leading him to his U.S. debut.

On 29 November 1963 Sandler joined the cast of the "Casino de Paris" revue at the Dunes Hotel in Las Vegas. In this extravaganza, produced by Frederic Apcar, Tony Sandler performed side by side with French star Line Renaud and also one American entertainer Ralph Young.

== Sandler & Young (1963–1987) ==
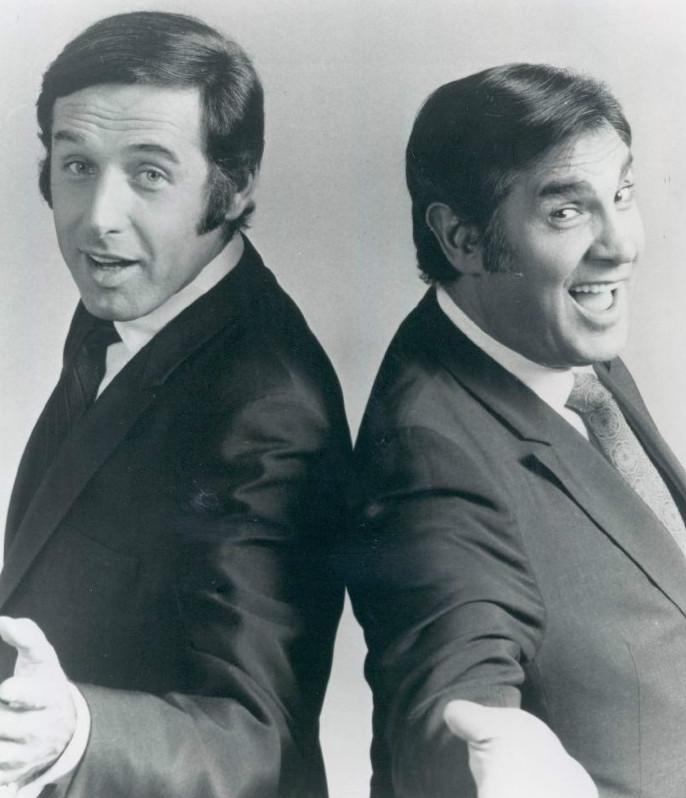
Sandler (left) with Ralph Young, 1970

Tony Sandler and Ralph Young stayed for two seasons committed to the Casino de Paris show. In 1965 Tony Sandler and Ralph Young decided to cease work as soloists and perform together as a singing team.

The hit duo Sandler and Young performed for two decades as headliners in the main showrooms of the major Las Vegas hotels and casinos and all over the country. They secured guest spots on many national TV shows and sold millions of records, making them one of the most popular acts in show business.

In the mid-eighties, Ralph Young retired from the act. On special occasions, Sandler and Young reteamed to perform to sellout crowds. Their last appearance together was at the 2003 All Stars benefit show Let Freedom Ring in Palm Springs to honor the victims of 9/11.

Ralph Young died at his Palm Springs home on 22 August 2008 at the age of 90. Several Sandler and Young albums have recently been re-released by the Butterfly label.

== Solo work ==
After Young's retirement, Sandler, 16 years younger, continued to perform and produce, singing American and European repertory. In 1985, for the TV network PBS he hosted the programs Portrait of Europe: Flanders and For the Night of Christmas from Bruges.

In the nineties he toured solo with his one-man show, Chevalier—Maurice & Me, and with the symphony–pop production My Paris, arranged by Peter Matz. Sandler portrayed the life and work of Maurice Chevalier. In the same period Sandler toured very intensely with musical productions such as "Best of Broadway", "Sandler sings Lerner & Loewe" and "Sandler sings Jacques Brel".

In 2005 Sandler produced Mijn Moederspraak, An Anthology of Flemish Art and Folk Songs, containing Flemish folk songs arranged by pianist Gregory Theisen.

In another 2005 project "The Great International Songbook", Sandler performed an international repertoire with both big band and quintet or trio and performed as well in Europe as in the USA.

He hosted the television special Tony Sandler's Holiday Greetings with the Viking Choir, which was broadcast on PBS.
