= Sandler and Young =

Popular music duo from the 1960s through the 1980s

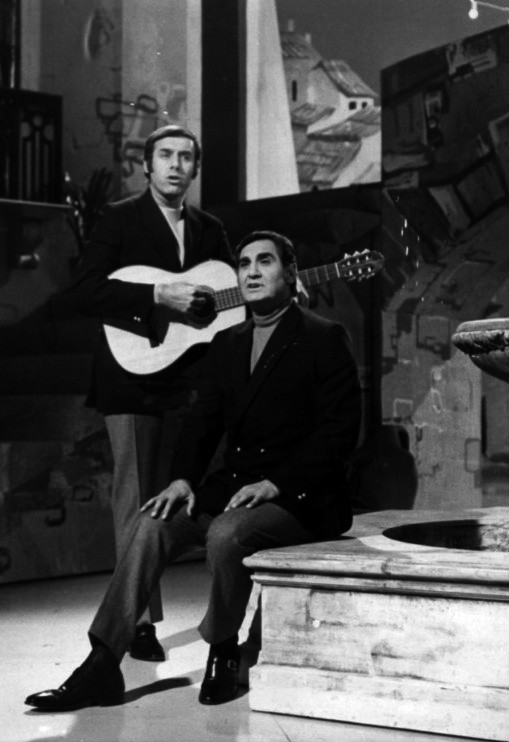
- Performing on Kraft Music Hall, 1969

Background information
- Years active: 1965–1983
- Label: Capitol Records

Sandler and Young were an American musical duo from the 1960s through the 1980s, composed of Belgian singer Tony Sandler and native New Yorker Ralph Young.

== First success ==
Sandler and Young appeared with Polly Bergen in her show at the Las Vegas Desert Inn Hotel and Casino, performing for 11 minutes between her costume changes. This engagement was the first of many the three would make together. Sandler and Young further advanced their careers with bookings at the Coconut Grove nightclub in the Ambassador Hotel in Hollywood, which put the duo in front of celebrities and movie stars. Among the people in attendance was Alan W. Livingston, then-president of Capitol Records, who signed them to a recording contract.

== Fame ==
During the following ten years, they released several albums for Capitol. Their producer was future Capitol president Dave Cavanaugh, and their musical directors included Billy May, Jimmy Jones, Luther Henderson, and Sid Feller.

Sandler & Young performed numerous concerts in clubs, showrooms, and concert halls throughout the US and Canada. In 1972 Sandler & Young appeared in an extended Christmas commercial from General Motors, part of a GM-sponsored Canadian television special called Two Christmases.

Starting in 1968, they returned frequently, and sometimes for several weeks, to Las Vegas, as headliners at the Sahara Hotel, the Dunes Hotel, the Flamingo Hilton (1969, 1970, 1972, 1973, 1974), Caesars Palace (1969) and the Thunderbird Hotel (1976). They performed also at The Plaza_Hotel in New York, Blue Room in Washington D.C., De Cocoanut_Grove_(Ambassador_Hotel) in Hollywood, The Shamrock Hotel in Houston, the Omni Shoreham Hotel in Washington DC and in Madison Square Garden in 1967.

Guest shots followed on national TV shows, including:

- The Ed Sullivan Show (7 episodes)
- The Mike Douglas Show (30 episodes)
- The Hollywood Palace
- The Milton Berle Show
- The Andy Williams Show
- The Merv Griffin Show (26 episodes)
- The Tonight Show Starring Johnny Carson (9 episodes)
- The David Frost Show (3 episodes)
- The Red Skelton Show (03/28/67)
- The Joey Bishop Show (2 episodes)
- That Show with Joan Rivers (12/13/68)
- The Today Show.

In 1969, Sandler and Young hosted Kraft Music Hall from London for NBC for 13 weeks.

In the 1970s, Sandler and Young started their own label, RALTON Records, and released the following albums on it: Once More with Feeling, You've Got a Friend, Sandler & Young Go Country, The Many Moods of Tony Sandler & Ralph Young, Pause a While and Sandler & Young Thank Irving Berlin.

In the 1980s, the duo was parodied by Martin Short (playing Sandler) and Eugene Levy (playing Young) on the comedy TV show SCTV.

== Retirement ==
In the mid-1980s, Young, then 65, retired from the concert stage to spend more time with his family in Palm Springs and Los Angeles. Sandler, the younger of the two by 16 years, continued to tour the country with a repertoire of musical theatre and European songs as well as a one man-show Chevalier, Maurice and Me.

In 1995 Capitol Records released the compilation album Sandler & Young, Great Gentlemen of Song.

On special occasions, Sandler and Young re-teamed to perform to sellout crowds. Their last appearance together was at the 2003 All Stars benefit show Let Freedom Ring in Palm Springs to honor the victims of 9/11.

Ralph Young died at his Palm Springs home on August 22, 2008 at the age of 90.

Many of the Sandler and Young albums have been remastered (Tony Sandler Legacy Series) and re-released on CD. The music can be found on many social network sites.

== Discography ==
- "Side by Side" (Capitol, 1966)
- "On the Move" (Capitol, 1967)
- "Sunshine Days" (Capitol, 1968)
- "The 'In Person' Album" (Capitol, 1968)
- "The Christmas World of Tony Sandler & Ralph Young" (Capitol, 1968)
- "Together" (Capitol, 1968)
- "Pretty Things Come in Twos" (Capitol, 1970)
- "Honey Come Back" (Capitol, 1970)
- "Cabaret" (Pickwick, 1972)
- "Cottonfields/Spanish Eyes" (Pickwick, 1973)
- "Happy Holidays" (Pickwick, 1975)
- "Happy Holidays!" (Pickwick, 1976)
- "I Believe" (Pickwick International Productions, 1976)

== Accolades ==
In 1998, a Golden Palm Star on the Palm Springs, California, Walk of Stars was dedicated to them.
