= Richard Blackwell =

American journalist and fashion critic (1922–2008)

- Born: Richard Sylvan Selzer; August 29, 1922; New York City, U.S.
- Died: October 19, 2008 (aged 86); Los Angeles, California, U.S.
- Occupations: Journalist, fashion critic, actor
- Years active: 1938–1998
- Partner: Robert L. Spencer

Richard Blackwell (August 29, 1922 – October 19, 2008), also known as Mr. Blackwell, was an American fashion critic, journalist, television and radio personality, artist, child actor and fashion designer. He was the creator of the "Ten Worst Dressed Women List", an annual awards presentation he unveiled in January of each year. Blackwell published the "Fabulous Fashion Independents" list and an annual Academy Awards fashion review, both of which receive somewhat less media attention. His partner of 60 years, Beverly Hills hairdresser Robert L. Spencer, was also his manager. He wrote two books, Mr. Blackwell: 30 Years of Fashion Fiascos and an autobiography, From Rags to Bitches.

== Early life ==
Blackwell was born Richard Sylvan Selzer in the Bensonhurst section of Brooklyn to Henry Selzer, a working-class printer, and Eva Selzer, who were the American-born children of Jewish immigrants from the Russian Empire. He had one older brother. He claimed he was severely beaten by a stepfather, often sleeping in the alley beneath a fire escape with a broken bottle for protection rather than face further abuse. He told Howard Stern that as a 7-year-old boy, he had once had to beg for a quarter on the street so he could buy something to eat. His father was frequently absent or drunk, and men would take him to a nearby alley and abuse him. He was scared, hungry, and did whatever he could to stay alive. He only went as far as the third grade in school.

When he was 11, he was raped by an adult at a boys' camp.

== Career ==
=== Acting ===
Blackwell began acting in theaters in his teens, appearing in the original 1935 Broadway production of Sidney Kingsley's Dead End. Relocating to the West Coast (where he studied with Judy Garland and Mickey Rooney) he adopted the professional name "Dick Ellis" and played small parts in the movies. Between acting parts, he worked as a messenger at Warner Bros. Studio in Burbank, California. Howard Hughes then signed him to RKO and changed his name to Richard Blackwell. He returned to Broadway in 1944 for Catherine Was Great, which starred Mae West, but left acting to become a Hollywood agent. He discovered his talent for fashion design while making stage costumes for his clients.

=== Fashion designer ===
The name "Mr. Blackwell" came in the late-1950s when he launched his clothing line. As with Valentino, Versace and later Richard Tyler, he and his line became synonymous. He was an important designer and during the 1960s he became the first in history to present his line on a television broadcast, and was the first to make his line available for plus-size women. His designer dresses sold for between $800 and $1,000 and were very successful. During the nearly two decade existence of the "House of Blackwell", he was designer to Yvonne De Carlo, Jayne Mansfield, Dorothy Lamour, Jane Russell and California first lady Nancy Reagan. At the height of his prominence, he openly declared his disdain for Women's Wear Daily and its publisher, John Fairchild. During the 1980s, the emerging drift toward casual wear brought an end to The House of Blackwell.

=== Fashion critic ===
In his beginning years as a designer he was asked to do a one-time article for The American Weekly magazine of the "10 Best and Worst Dressed" people and developed the franchise from it. Although best known for his "Worst Dressed" list, he maintained a successful career as a fashion journalist. He was syndicated in The Globe tabloid and wrote features in newspapers and lifestyle magazines. His "Fabulous Fashion Independents" often featured celebrities whom in prior years have been listed in his Ten Worst-Dressed.

=== Worst-dressed lists ===
The first "Ten Worst-Dressed Women" list premiered in 1960, to moderate media success, but as the House of Blackwell became more successful, the list took off. By its third year every television and radio network and virtually all news services worldwide began to cover it. Forty-seven years after first release, Blackwell annually spent a week after its publication on telephone interviews to fashion magazines, radio programs and news networks. The list is a conglomeration of techniques from first letter alliteration: Martha Stewart – "dull, dowdy and devastatingly dreary" and consonant: "fabulous fashion independents", to free verse: Cher – "A million beads/And one overexposed derriere", and pun: Queen Elizabeth, "Was she the palace Christmas tree, or just a royal clown?" About Wynonna Judd – "She looks like Hulk Hogan in sequins." Often, he simply quipped: Martha Stewart – "Dresses like the centerfold for Farmers' Almanac", and other times combines forms: Dixie Chicks – "They look like a trio of truck stop fashion tragedies/ trapped in a typhoon". The list's popularity waned in some segments of contemporary culture, many feeling that it is mean-spirited. However, Blackwell has displayed personal missives from many celebrities including Dolly Parton, Mariah Carey and country singers Barbara Mandrell and Tanya Tucker expressing their thanks for being selected. "Hollywood Beat" editor Marci Weiner, who was targeted by Blackwell who asked why she would "always dress like she's auditioning for a Fellini movie," was initially angered by her inclusion but later confessed that she considered it an honor. Still, despite its decline in universal acceptance, it was nonetheless published each year.

The list spawned a parade of imitators. Not all are lists, but virtually all include jibes and jabs similar to those that Blackwell first used to capture media attention in the early 1960s. Harry Shearer's Le Show radio program has featured "Blackwell on Blackwell". Political gadfly Roger Stone, himself known for his distinct fashion sense, has taken up Blackwell's tradition of best and worst dressed lists (albeit with a greater emphasis on the best dressed) since Blackwell's death.

=== Television and radio ===
Mr. Blackwell was a pioneer in television fashion and had been a fixture in the medium throughout his career as a designer and critic. Most recently, he appeared as himself on an episode of the ABC daytime soap, Port Charles. He hosted a daily program on Los Angeles' talk radio powerhouse KABC from 1972 to 1974, moving to KIEV 1975–1981.

In 1968 he starred in his own KCOP two-hour color television special, Mr. Blackwell Presents, with Anna Maria Alberghetti, Nick Adams and Rose Marie. It was the first telecast in history in which a designer presented his line on television. He continued to be recognized as preeminent during his years in the field. Also in 1968, Mr. Blackwell released an LP album of a show titled "The Mr. Blackwell Show" on the Rob Rich Records label that was presented on stage at The Desert Inn in Las Vegas in 1967, as well as The Cincinnati Symphony Orchestra in early 1967 as well. The album only saw limited distribution probably due to poor sales and as such is now a sought-after collector's item today. The album features Mr. Blackwell reciting fashion commentary over a musical background.

He often participated in audience critique segments on daytime talk and variety shows. He appeared on The Mike Douglas Show on numerous occasions, and on The Tonight Show Starring Johnny Carson, as a guest on the first broadcast after Carson moved the show from New York to Burbank. The May 2, 1972 edition also featured Rob Reiner, George Carlin and Johnny Mathis. He appeared on a total of four additional Tonight Shows between August 1970 and January 1973 and is included in the series Best Of The Tonight Show DVD sets. In 1992 he sued Carson for $11 million after the late night host joked that he had included Mother Teresa on one of his worst-dressed lists. The suit was quickly dismissed.

=== Honors ===
In 1997, a Golden Palm Star on the Palm Springs, California, Walk of Stars was dedicated to him.

== Personal life ==
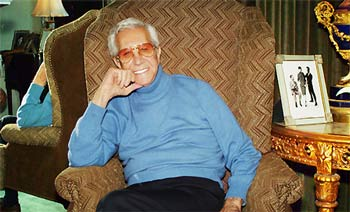
Mr. Blackwell at his home in Hancock Park in March 2008

Blackwell lived in the Hancock Park enclave of Los Angeles with his partner of 60 years, Robert Spencer. In 1964, they rented their home to The Beatles for the English band's first visit to the city. It was leaked to the media, however; and the group made other arrangements. He was also an artist known for his avant-garde, and he published several editions of his work, including his "Mother America" series.

In 2001, Blackwell was diagnosed with Bell's palsy, which causes limited to severe paralysis of facial muscles and can affect eyesight as well. If treated in time, it is completely curable; however, if not treated it can have life lasting effects. Blackwell was unable to unveil the 2000 list at a live news conference for the first time in its 40-year history and remained out of the public eye for six months. He came back for the 2001 "Worst Dressed" and returned to a full, normal social life.

Blackwell died in Los Angeles on October 19, 2008, of complications from an intestinal infection.

== In popular culture ==
He was played by Harry Shearer on May 20, 1995, on 'The Show Formerly Known as The Martin Short Show'.

== Filmography ==
- Little Tough Guy (1938) as Bud (un-credited)
- Juvenile Court (1938) as Ears (Dick Selzer)
- Promises! Promises! (1963) as Jayne Mansfield's wardrobe designer
- The Mike Douglas Show (1967-1975) as Himself
- Mr. Blackwell Presents (1968, TV Movie) (Host, designer and producer)
- The Virginia Graham Show (1970-1971, TV Series) as Himself
- The Tonight Show Starring Johnny Carson (1970-1973, TV Series) as Himself
- Truck Turner (1974) as Wino
- The Brady Brides (1981, TV Series) as Himself
- Matt Houston (1982, TV Series) as Valentine St. Clair
- Matlock (1990, two-part episode) as the Art dealer
- Blossom (1991, TV Series) as Himself
- Civil Wars (1992, TV Series) as Himself
- Hollywood Women (1993, TV Mini-Series documentary) as Talking head
- Howard Stern (1995, TV Series) as Himself
- Port Charles (1997-1999, TV Series) as Himself
- Intimate Portrait of Marilyn Monroe (1998, Lifetime TV documentary) as Himself (interviewee)
- Elvis Is Alive! I Swear I Saw Him Eating Ding Dongs Outside the Piggly Wiggly's (1998) as Himself
- Foreign Correspondents (1999) as Second Landlord (final film role)

== Stage ==
- Dead End (1935) – billed as Richard Seltzer
- Catherine Was Great (1944) – billed as Dick Ellis
- The Mr. Blackwell Show (1968)- billed as Mr.Blackwell

== Discography ==
- The Mr. Blackwell Show (1968) Original Show Recording released on Rob Rich Records (7-11) (1968)

== Bibliography ==
- Blackwell, Richard (1991). Mr. Blackwell: 30 Years of Fashion Fiascos (First ed.). Pharos. ISBN 0-88687-625-7.
- Blackwell, Richard (1995). From Rags to Bitches (First ed.). Stoddart. ISBN 1-881649-57-1.
- Marie, Rose (2003). Hold the Roses. Lexington, Kentucky: University Press of Kentucky. p. 264. ISBN 978-0813122649.
- Pittsburgh Press Staff (1 December 1968). "1968 Blackwell Host At House First Feather Pat's Pointers J Knit Stripes Fashionable". Pittsburgh Press. Pittsburgh: E. W. Scripps Company (then), Block Communications (now). p. 82. (subscription required)
