= List of The Tonight Show Starring Johnny Carson episodes (1974) =

- No. of episodes: 251

Release
- Original network: NBC

Season chronology
- ← Previous; 1973 episodes Next → 1975 episodes

The following is a list of episodes of the television series The Tonight Show Starring Johnny Carson which aired in 1974. In October, 1962 Johnny Carson took over as host of the show from the previous host Jack Paar.

== 1974 ==
=== January ===
No.	Original release date	Guest(s)	Musical/entertainment guest(s)
2828	January 1, 1974	John Davidson, Rebecca Ann King	Lola Falana
Carnac the Magnificent
2829	January 2, 1974	Tony Randall, Jerry Van Dyke, Pat Derby	Harry Chapin
Desk- "Hangover Clues"
2830	January 3, 1974	Carl Reiner, Johnny Brown, Dr. Carlfred Broderick	Burl Ives
Desk- "Comets"; Desk- "NFL Film Clips"
2831	January 4, 1974	Rex Reed	Roger Miller
2832	January 7, 1974	Lorne Greene (guest host), Rich Little	N/A
2833	January 8, 1974	James Caan, David Steinberg, Garson Kanin	Helen Forrest
Desk- "Various Awards Given At This Time of Year"
2834	January 9, 1974	Dom DeLuise, David Brenner, Beverly Sanders, Dr. Carl Sagan	N/A
Desk- "How to Get To Sleep"
2835	January 10, 1974	Robert Blake, Darrow Igus, Bob Rosefsky	Phyllis Newman
Desk- "January Sales and Their Unusual Nature"
2836	January 11, 1974	George Segal, James Whitmore, Jennifer O'Neill	John Denver
Desk- "California Weather"; Desk- "NFL Film Clips"
2837	January 14, 1974	John Davidson (guest host)	N/A
2838	January 15, 1974	Bob Hope, Marty Brill, Rufus Youngblood	Buddy Rich, Lana Cantrell
Desk- "Calendar of Events for 1974"
2839	January 16, 1974	George Gobel, Carol Wayne, Dr. Carlfred Broderick	Lennon Sisters
Desk- "Johnny Creates a Toilet Paper Shortage"
2840	January 17, 1974	Fernando Lamas, Richard Pryor, Robyn Hilton, William Peter Blatty	N/A
Desk- "Mailing Lists and Contests"
2841	January 18, 1974	Orson Bean, Carol Wayne	Johnny Mathis
Desk- "Greeting Cards"; Stump the Band
2842	January 21, 1974	McLean Stevenson (guest host)	Ronny Graham
2842	January 22, 1974	Bob Hope, Dick Shawn	John O'Banion, Victor Borge
Desk- "Academy Awards Nominations"
2843	January 23, 1974	Jack Benny, Mel Blanc, Jim Henson, Dr. Irwin Maxwell Stillman	Maria Muldaur ("Midnight at the Oasis" and "The Work Song")
Desk- "How to Get Rid of January Blahs"
2844	January 24, 1974	Paul Williams, Buck Henry, Adrienne Barbeau	N/A
2845	January 25, 1974	Karen Valentine, Scotty Plummer	Liberace, Ace Trucking Company
Desk- "First Drafts of Famous Speeches"
2846	January 28, 1974	Joey Bishop (guest host), Minnie Pearl	Mel Tormé
2847	January 29, 1974	Joey Bishop (guest host), Jack Klugman, Euell Gibbons	Sandler & Young
2848	January 30, 1974	Joey Bishop (guest host), Danny Thomas	Tony Bennett
Tony Bennett first appeared on Johnny's first Tonight Show on October 1, 1962, becoming Johnny's first musical guest.
2849	January 31, 1974	Joey Bishop (guest host)	N/A

=== February ===
No.	Original release date	Guest(s)	Musical/entertainment guest(s)
2850	February 1, 1974	Joey Bishop (guest host), Georgie Kaye	The Golddiggers: Maria Lauren – Riccio and Linda Eichberg (Alberici Sisters), Patti Pivarnik – Gribow, Deborah Pratt, Susan Buckner, Lee Nolting, Colleen Kincaid – Jackson, Robin Hoctor – Horneff.
2851	February 4, 1974	Joey Bishop (guest host), Roy Rogers	N/A
2852	February 5, 1974	Susan Sarandon, Albert Brooks	N/A
2853	February 6, 1974	Robert Blake, Freddie Prinze, Tisha Sterling	Talya Ferro
Desk- "Time Fillers"
2853	February 7, 1974	Jonathan Winters, Franklyn Ajaye	Bobby Goldsboro
Desk- "Honeymoon Questionnaires"
2854	February 8, 1974	Suzanne Pleshette, Jerry Van Dyke, Marcel Marceau, Tracy Newman	N/A
El Mouldo
2855	February 11, 1974	Steve Allen (guest host)	N/A
2856	February 12, 1974	Cathy Rigby	Connie Stevens, Wayne Newton
Carnac the Magnificent
2857	February 13, 1974	Carol Lawrence, Jack Albertson, Euell Gibbons	Robert Goulet
Mighty Carson Art Players- "Robin Hood"
2858	February 14, 1974	Fernando Lamas	Gladys Knight & The Pips
Desk- "What Kind of Person Are You?"
2859	February 15, 1974	McLean Stevenson, Steve Landesberg, Dr. William Nolen	Helen Reddy
Desk- "T.V. Guide Listings"
2860	February 18, 1974	Wayne Newton (guest host)	Buck Owens
2861	February 19, 1974	Dom DeLuise, Orson Bean, Dr. Carlfred Broderick	Marilyn Horne
Desk- "Johnny, Ed, and Doc Talk"
2862	February 20, 1974	Joan Embery, Sarah Miles, David Brenner, Kreskin	N/A
Johnny inquires about Doc's racehorses; Desk- "Do's and Don'ts in Singles Bars"
2863	February 21, 1974	Michael Landon, Rex Reed, Suzanne Somers	Bill Withers ("Ain't No Sunshine" and "The Same Love That Made Me Laugh")
Aunt Blabby
2864	February 22, 1974	Dennis Weaver, George Gobel, Barbara Howar	Lola Falana
Desk- "Blue Cards"
2865	February 25, 1974	John Denver (guest host), Susan Saint James	Pat Boone
2866	February 26, 1974	Joanna Cassidy, Dr. Carl Sagan	Ronny Graham
Desk- "What to Do While Waiting In Line To Get Gas"
2867	February 27, 1974	Jason Miller, Paul Williams, Ashley Montagu	Phyllis Newman
Desk- "Laws That Are Still On The Books In Several States"
2868	February 28, 1974	Bert Convy, Barbi Benton, Peter Tompkins, Carol Wayne	Johnny Mathis ("Life Is a Song Worth Singing", "I'm Stone in Love with You" and "I Won't Last a Day Without You")
Desk- "Energy Crisis"; Note: Carol Wayne filled in for Ed McMahon.

=== March ===
No.	Original release date	Guest(s)	Musical/entertainment guest(s)
2869	March 1, 1974	Jack Palance, Susan Sarandon, Sidney Sheldon	Tom Sullivan
Desk- "New Magazines"
2870	March 4, 1974	Shecky Greene (guest host)	Loretta Lynn
2871	March 5, 1974	Raquel Welch, Mervyn LeRoy	Glen Campbell
Desk- "Things That Are Tacky"
2872	March 6, 1974	Charlie Callas, Suzanne Somers	N/A
Stump the Band
2873	March 7, 1974	Freddie Prinze, Buck Henry, Craig Pease	Lola Falana ("Lean On Me" and "You've Got a Friend")
Desk- "Television Pilots That Didn't Make It"
2873	March 8, 1974	Bruce Dern, Gig Young, Gerard Nierenberg	Ricky Nelson
Band Number ("Ode to Billie Joe"); Commercial Blackouts
2874	March 11, 1974	Don Rickles (guest host)	N/A
2875	March 12, 1974	Don Rickles (guest host)	Roy Clark
2876	March 13, 1974	Don Rickles (guest host), Jack Klugman	Charo
2877	March 14, 1974	Don Rickles (guest host)	N/A
2878	March 15, 1974	Don Rickles (guest host), Bob Newhart, Ernest Borgnine	N/A
Band Number: "There's No Business Like Show Business"
2879	March 18, 1974	Don Rickles (guest host), Gabriel Kaplan	N/A
2880	March 19, 1974	Robert Blake, Bert Convy	Cleo Laine, John Dankworth
Sketch- "Philippine G.I. Interview"
2881	March 20, 1974	John Davidson, Rodney Dangerfield, Dr. David Reuben	Ethel Merman
2882	March 21, 1974	McLean Stevenson, George Carlin, Gene Hackman, Gloria DeHaven	N/A
Desk- "Fads That Never Made It"
2883	March 22, 1974	Lucille Ball, Dom DeLuise, Charlton Heston	Ace Trucking Company
Desk- "Lesser Known World Records from the Guinness Book"; Desi Arnaz Jr. makes a surprise appearance during Lucille Ball's segment.
2884	March 25, 1974	Anthony Newley (guest host), Bob Newhart	N/A
2885	March 26, 1974	James Garner, Suzanne Pleshette, Robert Klein, Jack Haley Jr.	N/A
Carnac the Magnificent
2886	March 27, 1974	George Peppard, Richard Lewis, Dr. Lendon Smith	Leslie Uggams
2887	March 28, 1974	Michael Landon, Carl Reiner, Joanna Cassidy	Gloria Loring
Desk- "When Should You Be Depressed?"; Stump the Band
2888	March 29, 1974	Roger Moore, Orson Bean, Charles Nelson Reilly, Darrow Igus	N/A
Desk- "Objects For The Time Capsule"

=== April ===
No.	Original release date	Guest(s)	Musical/entertainment guest(s)
2889	April 1, 1974	Roy Clark (guest host)	N/A
2890	April 2, 1974	none	N/A
2891	April 3, 1974	Steve Martin, Adrienne Barbeau, Bob Rosefsky	Buddy Rich, Charles Aznavour
Desk- "The Worst Awards"
2892	April 4, 1974	Dinah Shore, Marsha Mason, Dr. Carl Sagan	N/A
Desk- "Things That Happen Backstage at The Oscars"
2893	April 5, 1974	Debbie Reynolds, William Holden, Freddie Prinze, Richard Armour	N/A
Desk- "Blue Cards"
2894	April 8, 1974	McLean Stevenson (guest host), Sandy Duncan	N/A
2895	April 9, 1974	Andy Griffith, Jerry Van Dyke, Josephine Baker	Jackson Five ("Let It Be"/"Never Can Say Goodbye"/"Dancing Machine")
Desk- "Celebrity Tax Deductions"
2896	April 10, 1974	Danny Thomas, George Gobel, Ron Leibman	N/A
Desk- "New Amusement Parks"
2897	April 11, 1974	Joan Embery, Steve Landesberg, Diahann Carroll	Ronny Graham
Desk- "T.V. Guide's Listing of Various Television Shows"
2898	April 12, 1974	Ricardo Montalbán, Susan George, Marvin Hamlisch, Peter Benchley	N/A
Desk- "Last Minute Tax Tips"
2899	April 15, 1974	Barbara Walters (guest host), Fernando Lamas	N/A
2900	April 16, 1974	John Davidson, Robert Blake, Michael Preminger, Elaine Joyce	N/A
Sketch- "Stupid Canupide- Daredevil Interview"
2901	April 17, 1974	Bob Hope, Sid Caesar, George Segal, John Aspinall	N/A
Desk- "Messages for Ed"
2902	April 18, 1974	Don Knotts, Cindy Williams, Bert Convy	N/A
Desk- "Game Shows That Never Made It"
2903	April 19, 1974	Sammy Davis Jr., David Brenner, Carol Wayne	N/A
Desk- "How to Save Money"
2904	April 22, 1974	Michael Landon (guest host), Lorne Greene, Vincent Price	N/A
2905	April 23, 1974	John Davidson (guest host), Steve Allen, Lynn Redgrave	The Pointer Sisters
2906	April 24, 1974	Dom DeLuise (guest host), Suzanne Somers	Charo
2906	April 25, 1974	George Segal (guest host), Joan Rivers, Jean Stapleton	Roy Clark
2907	April 26, 1974	John Davidson (guest host), Norm Crosby	N/A
2908	April 29, 1974	Jim Nabors (guest host), Carol Burnett, Phyllis Diller	N/A
2909	April 30, 1974	Tony Randall, Florence Henderson, Paul Williams, Euell Gibbons	N/A
Carnac the Magnificent

=== May ===
No.	Original release date	Guest(s)	Musical/entertainment guest(s)
2910	May 1, 1974	Gabriel Kaplan, Cindy Williams, Kreskin, Donald Ashworth	Buddy Rich
Desk- "Comic Pictures of Johnny's Vacation to New York City and Nebraska"
2911	May 2, 1974	James Coco, Myron Cohen, Carol Wayne	Ben Vereen
Mighty Carson Art Players- "Tea-Time Movie"
2912	May 3, 1974	Cloris Leachman, John Amos	Lola Falana
Desk- "Burbank's Calendar of Events"
2913	May 6, 1974	Rich Little (guest host), Dick Shawn	Della Reese
2914	May 7, 1974	Jan Munroe, Buddy Hackett, Cass Elliot, Dong Kingman	N/A
Desk- "Blue Cards" Note: A musicians' strike begins resulting in the absence of Doc Severinsen and the band.
2915	May 8, 1974	Alex Karras, Michael Skinner	N/A
Desk- "Celebrity Recipes"
2916	May 9, 1974	Jonathan Winters, Susan Sarandon, Jack Anderson	N/A
Desk- "Folk Lore Cures"
2917	May 10, 1974	Jack Palance, Orson Bean, Joanna Cassidy	Jose Molina
Sketch- "Interview with Patsy Award Loser- Jack Rabbit"
2918	May 13, 1974	Florence Henderson (guest host), Charles Nelson Reilly	N/A
2919	May 14, 1974	David Steinberg, Rob Reiner, Ronny Graham	N/A
Desk- "Mother's Day Cards"
2920	May 15, 1974	Robert Blake, Fernando Lamas, Charles Fleischer, Victoria Principal	John Twomey
Desk- "Strange Money Grants Approved by The U.S. Government"
2921	May 16, 1974	McLean Stevenson, Joe Flynn, Dr. Lendon Smith	N/A
Desk- "Lesser Known Scandals in Government"
2922	May 17, 1974	Vincent Price, Joan Rivers, Bert Convy	Chaz Chase
2923	May 20, 1974	Telly Savalas (guest host), Shelley Winters, O. J. Simpson	N/A
2924	May 21, 1974	Bob Hope, Don Rickles, Michael Landon, Freddie Prinze, Carol Wayne	N/A
Carnac the Magnificent
2925	May 22, 1974	Charlton Heston, David Brenner, Norman Mailer	Ian Whitcomb ("Hungry Women")
Desk- "Newlyweds: How They Met" (Johnny reads questionnaire responses by honeymooners in the Poconos)
2926	May 23, 1974	Joan Embery, Eva Gabor, Madeline Peisakoff	The Persuasions
Desk- "3rd Graders Recipes"; Mighty Carson Art Players- "The Shah of Ababaland"
2927	May 24, 1974	Suzanne Pleshette, Jim Henson, Bobby Kosser, private detective Hal Lipset	N/A
Desk- "Timmy Awards"
2928	May 27, 1974	Steve Allen (guest host), Dr. Joyce Brothers, George Kennedy	N/A
2929	May 28, 1974	Bill Cosby (guest host), Norm Crosby, Jerry Van Dyke	N/A
2930	May 29, 1974	John Davidson, George Gobel, Richard Armour	N/A
Desk- "Acts Booked During the Musicians' Strike"; Stump the Band
2931	May 30, 1974	Cloris Leachman, Gabriel Kaplan	Ian Whitcomb, Johnny Mathis
Desk- "Phone Messages for the Hand"
2932	May 31, 1974	Shecky Greene (guest host)	Charo, Mac Davis

=== June ===
No.	Original release date	Guest(s)	Musical/entertainment guest(s)
2933	June 3, 1974	George Carlin, Jackie Cooper, Marvin Hamlisch, Jack Knight	N/A
Desk- Discussion about Johnny booming tennis career.
2934	June 4, 1974	Joan Rivers, George Peppard, Lena Zavaroni	Tom Sullivan
Desk- Discussion on the California election.
2935	June 5, 1974	Rich Little, Truman Capote	Olivia Newton-John performed "If You Love Me (Let Me Know)" and "I Honestly Love You"
2936	June 6, 1974	Michael Caine, Karen Valentine, Bert Convy	Ethel Merman ("Alexander's Ragtime Band" and "I Get a Kick Out of You")
2937	June 7, 1974	Joey Bishop (guest host), Fernando Lamas	N/A
2938	June 10, 1974	Joey Bishop (guest host), George Burns, Kreskin	N/A
2938	June 11, 1974	Joey Bishop (guest host), Jack Klugman, Rip Taylor, Stephanie Edwards	Dick Roman ("Let Me Try Again")
2939	June 12, 1974	Joey Bishop (guest host), Rex Reed, Suzanne Somers	Anne Murray
2940	June 13, 1974	Joey Bishop (guest host), Steve Landesberg	N/A
2941	June 14, 1974	Joey Bishop (guest host), Dr. Joyce Brothers	N/A
2942	June 17, 1974	McLean Stevenson (guest host), Cloris Leachman, Alex Karras, Dr. Lendon Smith	Helen Reddy
Desk- McLean reads news clippings he had been saving (consisting of: sunflower seeds as a source of power, Nashville, Tennessee, heating the city with garbage, and flying chickens.)
2943	June 18, 1974	McLean Stevenson (guest host), Juliet Prowse, Steve Martin, Robert Duvall	Lou Rawls
2944	June 19, 1974	McLean Stevenson (guest host), Harvey Korman, Florence Henderson	Mac Davis
Band Number: Tribute to Duke Ellington
2945	June 20, 1974	McLean Stevenson (guest host), Edward Asner, Chuck Barris, Doug Brown	Glen Campbell
2946	June 21, 1974	McLean Stevenson (guest host), George Gobel, Peter Fonda	N/A
Desk- "Tips for Summer"
2947	June 24, 1974	Jack Benny, Richard Harris	N/A
Desk- Johnny and Doc discuss an item in a Wisconsin newspaper.
2948	June 25, 1974	Milton Berle, Susan Sarandon, Pat Derby	Leslie Uggams
Carnac the Magnificent
2949	June 26, 1974	Elke Sommer, Myron Cohen	Wayne Newton
Desk- "Dangers of Being in the Sun Too Long"
2950	June 27, 1974	Bob Uecker, Robert Klein, Dr. Carl Sagan	Donny Osmond, Marie Osmond
Desk- "Strange Movie Marquees"
2951	June 28, 1974	John Davidson (guest host), Cliff Arquette, Sandy Duncan, Rip Taylor	N/A

=== July ===
No.	Original release date	Guest(s)	Musical/entertainment guest(s)
2952	July 1, 1974	Tony Randall, Buck Henry, Richard Lawrence Williams, Carol Wayne	Tom Sullivan
Mighty Carson Art Players- "Tea-Time Movie"
2953	July 2, 1974	Bob Newhart, Elliott Gould, George Segal	Monti Rock
2954	July 3, 1974	Dom DeLuise, Orson Bean, Rodney Dangerfield, Mariette Hartley	N/A
2955	July 4, 1974	Richard Harris, Ann Turkel, Burt Mustin	Ronny Graham
Desk- "How to Throw an Outdoor Party"
2956	July 5, 1974	George Carlin (guest host), Jimmy Breslin, David Carradine	Kenny Rankin
2957	July 8, 1974	Bert Convy, David Brenner, Adrienne Barbeau	Billy Strange
Desk- "Stills of Television Shows"
2958	July 9, 1974	Robert Blake, Charlie Callas	Tommy Leonetti
Desk- "Letters from Children Describing their Fathers"
2959	July 10, 1974	Rich Little, Jack Palance, Freddie Prinze	N/A
Desk- "The Art of Dislodging Your Summer Lodgers"
2960	July 11, 1974	McLean Stevenson, Suzanne Pleshette, Ashley Montagu	N/A
2961	July 12, 1974	Peter Bogdanovich (guest host), Cybill Shepherd, Madeline Kahn, Burt Reynolds	Ace Trucking Company
2962	July 15, 1974	James Stewart, Suzanne Somers	Paul Anka
2963	July 16, 1974	Bob Hope, Charles Nelson Reilly, Dr. Joyce Brothers	N/A
2964	July 17, 1974	Fernando Lamas, Jerry Van Dyke	Lola Falana
2965	July 18, 1974	Jaye P. Morgan	N/A
2966	July 19, 1974	John Denver (guest host), George Gobel, Smothers Brothers	N/A
2967	July 22, 1974	Danny Thomas, Bert Convy, Adrienne Barbeau	Kelly Garrett
2968	July 23, 1974	Don Meredith	N/A
2969	July 24, 1974	Bob Uecker, Adrienne Barbeau	Helen Reddy
2970	July 25, 1974	Euell Gibbons	N/A
2971	July 26, 1974	Roy Clark (guest host), Ernest Borgnine, Kreskin	N/A
2972	July 29, 1974	TBA	N/A
2973	July 30, 1974	Tony Randall, Jennifer O'Neill	Johnny Mathis ("Our Day Will Come")
Desk- Johnny described how his accident (falling off the slant board) occurred.
2974	July 31, 1974	Orson Bean	Buddy Rich, Gerri Granger

=== August ===
No.	Original release date	Guest(s)	Musical/entertainment guest(s)
2975	August 1, 1974	Joey Bishop (guest host), Robert Blake, Suzanne Somers	N/A
2976	August 2, 1974	Joey Bishop (guest host), Shelley Winters	N/A
2977	August 5, 1974	Joey Bishop (guest host), Bob Rosefsky	N/A
2978	August 6, 1974	Joey Bishop (guest host), Fernando Lamas, Dub Taylor	Charo
2978	August 7, 1974	Joey Bishop (guest host), Norm Crosby, Henny Youngman	Aretha Franklin
Audience Talent Show (Joey Bishop)
2979	August 8, 1974	Joey Bishop (guest host), Steve Allen	N/A
2980	August 9, 1974	Joey Bishop (guest host), Susan Sarandon	N/A
281	August 12, 1974	John Davidson (guest host), Charles Nelson Reilly, Stephanie Edwards	Olivia Newton-John, Burns & Schreiber
2982	August 13, 1974	John Davidson (guest host), Sandy Duncan	Larry Kert, Loretta Lynn
2983	August 14, 1974	John Davidson (guest host), Cliff Arquette, Rich Little	Della Reese
2984	August 15, 1974	John Davidson (guest host), Don Adams, Bob Uecker, Kip Addotta,	N/A
2985	August 16, 1974	John Davidson (guest host), Pat Paulsen, Adrienne Barbeau	Charo, Hoyt Axton
2986	August 19, 1974	Bill Cosby (guest host), Jack Klugman, Monte Landis, Barbi Benton, Marty Feldman	Jackson Five ("Dancing Machine")
2987	August 20, 1974	Bill Cosby (guest host), Alex Karras, David Steinberg, Farrah Fawcett	The Temptations
With friends, Bill Cosby performs a 'dining room' sketch.
2988	August 21, 1974	Rich Little (guest host), Jack Benny, Marvin Hamlisch	Lola Falana
2989	August 22, 1974	Rich Little (guest host), Ted Knight	Mac Davis
2990	August 23, 1974	McLean Stevenson (guest host), Gabriel Kaplan	Joe Williams
2991	August 26, 1974	Sammy Davis Jr. (guest host), Robert Blake, Michael Landon	N/A
2992	August 27, 1974	Sammy Davis Jr. (guest host), Evel Knievel, Burt Reynolds, Richard Pryor	Helen Reddy
2993	August 28, 1974	Sammy Davis Jr. (guest host), David Brenner	Kool & The Gang
2994	August 29, 1974	Sammy Davis Jr. (guest host), David Frye	Roger Miller
2995	August 30, 1974	Sammy Davis Jr. (guest host), Gene Kelly	Liza Minnelli

=== September ===
No.	Original release date	Guest(s)	Musical/entertainment guest(s)
2996	September 2, 1974	Doris Day, Rodney Dangerfield, Burt Mustin, Carol Wayne	N/A
Desk- Johnny talks about a nerve injury he sustained while working in Las Vegas which forced him to miss all of August. Note: Carol Wayne filled in for Ed McMahon; Mighty Carson Art Players- "Tea-Time Movie"
2997	September 3, 1974	Joan Rivers, George Peppard	Gloria Loring
Aunt Blabby
2998	September 4, 1974	Angie Dickinson, George Gobel, Bert Convy, Peter Gent	N/A
Desk- "What You Don't Want to Hear In The Hospital"
2999	September 6, 1974	Diahann Carroll, Jack Albertson, Charles Nelson Reilly	Diahann Carroll performed ("Tell Me a Lie", "Help Me Make It Through the Night" and "No Love At All"), Phyllis Newman performed ("He Loves Me")
Desk- "Party Survival Manual"
3000	September 9, 1974	Dom DeLuise (guest host), James Coco, Kip Addotta, Dr. Lendon Smith	Pat Boone
The 3,000th episode of The Tonight Show Starring Johnny Carson airs.
3001	September 10, 1974	Shecky Greene, Antony Armstrong-Jones, Graham Kerr	Lola Falana
Carnac the Magnificent
3002	September 11, 1974	Robert Blake, Freddie Prinze	Bee Gees, Lou Rawls
Desk- "New Television Shows"
3003	September 12, 1974	John Davidson, James Garner, Elizabeth Ashley, Dr. Carl Sagan	N/A
Desk- "Guinness World Records"
3004	September 13, 1974	Joan Embery, Lawrence Welk, David Brenner, Ashley Montagu	N/A
Desk- "Little-Known Phobias"; Peter Falk makes a surprise appearance (in costume) to promote the upcoming Columbo season premiere.
3005	September 16, 1974	Roy Clark (guest host), Jack Klugman, Charles Nelson Reilly, Alex Karras	Della Reese
3006	September 17, 1974	Tony Randall, Florence Henderson, Jerry Van Dyke	N/A
Desk- "T.V. Guide Wrap-ups"
3007	September 18, 1974	Dennis Weaver, Harvey Korman, Lucie Arnaz	N/A
Desk- "New Special Interest Magazines"
3008	September 19, 1974	Sammy Davis Jr., Steve Martin	N/A
Desk- "Ripley's Believe It or Not"
3009	September 20, 1974	George C. Scott, Gabriel Kaplan	N/A
Desk- "How to Tell When Your Car Needs Repair"
3010	September 23, 1974	McLean Stevenson (guest host), Roger Moore, Arnold Schwarzenegger	N/A
3011	September 24, 1974	Bob Hope, Sammy Davis Jr., Michael Landon, Joan Rivers	N/A
3012	September 25, 1974	Orson Bean, Dr. Joyce Brothers	Buddy Rich, Tom Sullivan
Sketch- "An Evening with Eddie Edison"
3013	September 26, 1974	Burt Reynolds, Dom DeLuise, Art Carney	Ace Trucking Company
Desk- "Next Year's Miss America Questions"
3014	September 27, 1974	Dick Cavett, Karen Valentine, Richard Armour	Shirley Jones
Desk- "NFL Film Clips"
3015	September 30, 1974	Euell Gibbons, Lauren Hutton, Robert Klein	Minnie Riperton, Roy Clark
Desk- Johnny and Ed talked about Lowell, Massachusetts giving a day for Ed.

=== October ===
No.	Original release date	Guest(s)	Musical/entertainment guest(s)
3016	October 1, 1974	TBA	N/A
12th Anniversary Show
3017	October 2, 1974	Don Rickles (guest host), Redd Foxx	Pat Boone
Desk- "Discussion About Anniversary Show"
3018	October 3, 1974	Don Rickles (guest host)	N/A
3019	October 4, 1974	Don Rickles (guest host)	N/A
3020	October 7, 1974	Don Rickles (guest host)	N/A
3021	October 8, 1974	Don Rickles (guest host)	N/A
3022	October 9, 1974	Don Rickles (guest host)	N/A
3023	October 10, 1974	Don Rickles (guest host)	N/A
3024	October 11, 1974	Don Rickles (guest host), Dan Rowan, Dick Martin	Carrie McDowell
3025	October 14, 1974	John Davidson (guest host), Ruth Buzzi, Cloris Leachman	N/A
3026	October 15, 1974	Efrem Zimbalist Jr., Kathryn Kuhlman	Linda Hopkins
Desk- "Johnny's Trip to England"
3027	October 16, 1974	Paul Williams, Freddie Prinze, Bob Uecker	Ian Whitcomb
Desk- "Tonight Show Memorabilia"
3028	October 17, 1974	Robert Blake, Flip Wilson, Buck Henry	Lee Horwin ("No More" and "Marieke")
Desk- "Tips to Really Beat Inflation"
3029	October 18, 1974	Carl Reiner, David Brenner, Madlyn Rhue, Burt Mustin	N/A
Desk- "Items from Newspaper"
3030	October 21, 1974	Dan Rowan & Dick Martin (guest hosts), George C. Scott	Ronny Graham
3031	October 22, 1974	Tony Randall, Kip Addotta, James Dickey	Ethel Merman ("Someone To Watch Over Me" and "Some People")
Carnac the Magnificent
3032	October 23, 1974	Buddy Hackett, Michael Preminger	Lana Cantrell
Desk- "Johnny's Early Days in Memory of His Birthday"
3033	October 24, 1974	Rich Little, Cloris Leachman, Garson Kanin	Donna Theodore
Sketch- "Old Man Carson"
3034	October 25, 1974	Charlton Heston, Dick Shawn, Ashley Montagu	Maxine Weldon
Desk- "What To Do If Your Boyfriend Jilts You"
3035	October 28, 1974	Florence Henderson (guest host), Joan Rivers, Dr. Irwin Maxwell Stillman, David Hartman	Mac Davis
3036	October 29, 1974	Truman Capote, John Davidson, Bert Convy, Kreskin	Lana Cantrell
Desk- "Propositions That Didn't Make It On The Ballot"
3037	October 30, 1974	Orson Bean	Della Reese, Ace Trucking Company
Stump the Band
3038	October 31, 1974	Gabriel Kaplan, Sharon Farrell	Lee Horwin, Roger Miller
Desk- "Halloween Tricks from Celebrities' Houses"

=== November ===
No.	Original release date	Guest(s)	Musical/entertainment guest(s)
3039	November 1, 1974	Madeline Kahn, Fernando Lamas	N/A
Desk- "Guinness Book of Records"
3040	November 4, 1974	Debbie Reynolds (guest host), Bob Hope, George Carlin, Shelley Winters	Liberace
(11/5/74 pre-empted for NBC News mid-term election night coverage)
3041	November 6, 1974	David Steinberg, Dub Taylor	Buddy Rich, Dionne Warwick
Desk- "Capsule Comments from T.V. Guide"
3042	November 7, 1974	Shecky Greene, Redd Foxx, Susannah York	Monti Rock
Stump the Band
3043	November 8, 1974	Joan Rivers, John Davidson, Valerie Perrine	Ronny Graham
Desk- "Ways To Detect Inflation"
3044	November 11, 1974	John Denver (guest host), Sandy Duncan, Marvin Hamlisch	N/A
3045	November 12, 1974	Dyan Cannon, Carmel Myers	Phyllis Newman, Tiny Tim
Desk- "Replacement Television Shows for Second Season"
3046	November 13, 1974	George Burns, Don Adams	Lola Falana
Desk- "Quiz to Determine Whether You're a Male Chauvinist"
3047	November 14, 1974	Robert Blake, George Gobel, Madlyn Rhue	Charles Aznavour
Desk- "NFL Film Clips"
3048	November 15, 1974	Lucille Ball, John Byner, John McKay	Jackson Five ("It's Too Late to Change the Time" and "Whatever You Got, I Want")
Desk- "Christmas Catalogues"
3049	November 18, 1974	McLean Stevenson (guest host), Barbara Eden, Darrow Igus, Mr. Wizard	Donny Osmond, Marie Osmond
3050	November 19, 1974	Orson Bean, Madlyn Rhue	Petula Clark, Ray Charles
Carnac the Magnificent
3051	November 20, 1974	Jonathan Winters, Pearl Williams, Sammy Cahn	Kelly Garrett
Desk- "Burbank Drivers License Test"
3052	November 21, 1974	Bruce Dern, Kelly Monteith, Dr. Michael Fox	Peggy Lee
Desk- "Letters from Newlyweds"
3053	November 22, 1974	George Carlin	Gladys Knight & The Pips
3054	November 25, 1974	Joey Bishop (guest host), Norm Crosby, Paul Williams	N/A
3055	November 26, 1974	Joey Bishop (guest host), Steve Martin, Bert Convy, Rip Taylor	N/A
3056	November 27, 1974	Joey Bishop (guest host), Dr. Joyce Brothers, Buddy Hackett, Jack Klugman	Second Nature
3057	November 28, 1974	Joey Bishop (guest host), George Foreman, Shelley Winters	N/A
3058	November 29, 1974	Joey Bishop (guest host), David Brenner	Frankie Avalon

=== December ===
No.	Original release date	Guest(s)	Musical/entertainment guest(s)
3059	December 2, 1974	Joey Bishop (guest host), Christopher Lee	N/A
3060	December 3, 1974	Bob Newhart, Gore Vidal	Kenny Rankin, Phyllis Newman
Desk- "Johnny's Vacation"
3061	December 4, 1974	Shecky Greene, Buck Henry	Johnny Mathis, Ronny Cox
Desk- "NFL Film Clips"
3062	December 5, 1974	John Byner, Carol Wayne	Beverly Sills, Billy Daniels
Mighty Carson Art Players- "Tea-Time Movie"
3063	December 6, 1974	Peter Falk, John Cassavetes, Myron Cohen, Gary Mull	Lee Horwin
Stump the Band
3064	December 9, 1974	Bert Convy (guest host), Burt Reynolds, Carol Burnett	Kentucky Fried Theatre
3065	December 10, 1974	Flip Wilson, Tom Dreesen, Dr. Lendon Smith	Pat Boone ("Texas Woman")
Desk- "Letters from Children to Santa Claus"
3066	December 11, 1974	Lauren Bacall, George Gobel, Raquel Welch	N/A
Stump the Band
3067	December 12, 1974	Richard Harris, Bob Hope, Steve Landesberg, Adrienne Barbeau	N/A
3068	December 13, 1974	Cloris Leachman, Rich Little, Dr. Carl Sagan	Bobby Vinton
Desk- "Johnny and Ed Cut Off Their Ties and Other Silly Things"
3069	December 16, 1974	Michael Landon (guest host), Ernest Borgnine, Sandy Duncan	N/A
3070	December 17, 1974	Jack Lemmon, Walter Matthau, Florence Henderson, Billy Wilder	N/A
Desk- "Christmas in California"
3071	December 18, 1974	Robert Blake, Jerry Van Dyke	Erroll Garner, Mac Davis
3072	December 19, 1974	David Brenner, Burt Mustin	Vikki Carr
New Products
3073	December 20, 1974	McLean Stevenson, Rodney Dangerfield, Bob Rosefsky	Lola Falana
3074	December 23, 1974	Burt Reynolds (guest host), Jonathan Winters, Norman Fell, Dinah Shore, Robert Fuller	Della Reese
3075	December 25, 1974	Burt Reynolds (guest host), Madeline Kahn, David Steinberg, Betty White	N/A
3076	December 26, 1974	Burt Reynolds (guest host) (Postponed 30 minutes for NBC Jack Benny obit/remembrance report) Dinah Shore, Dub Taylor, Kaye Ballard	Kelly Garrett
3077	December 27, 1974	Burt Reynolds (guest host), George Carlin, Cybill Shepherd, Ben Johnson, Linda Bennett	Mel Tillis
3078	December 30, 1974	Joan Rivers (guest host), Bea Arthur, Harvey Korman, Rip Taylor	Mac Davis
3079	December 31, 1974	Orson Bean, Madlyn Rhue, Gabriel Kaplan	Roy Clark
There was no monologue, with Johnny choosing to show the last Tonight Show appearance of his mentor, Jack Benny, who had died on December 26.
