= List of The Tonight Show Starring Johnny Carson episodes (1973) =

Episodes in 1973

- No. of episodes: 260

Release
- Original network: NBC

Season chronology
- ← Previous; 1972 episodes Next → 1974 episodes

The following is a list of episodes of the television series The Tonight Show Starring Johnny Carson which aired in 1973. In October, 1962 Johnny Carson took over as host of the show from the previous host Jack Paar.

== 1973 ==
=== January ===
No.	Original release date	Guest(s)	Musical/entertainment guest(s)
2619	January 1, 1973	Burt Reynolds (guest host), Dom DeLuise, Dyan Cannon, Carol Burnett, Fernando Lamas, James Hampton	Kaye Ballard
2620	January 2, 1973	David Steinberg, Leslie Caron, Joe Flynn	Freda Payne
Desk- "New Year's Eve"
2621	January 3, 1973	Joan Rivers, Jack Lemmon, Billy Wilder	Helen Reddy, The Illegitimate Theater
Desk- "How to Know When You're Old"
2622	January 4, 1973	Oral Roberts, Buddy Hackett, Dan Jenkins	Monti Rock
Desk- "Johnny and Ed discuss: Ed's trip to Aspen, Johnny's critical of noisy snowmobiles and the damage they can cause."
2623	January 5, 1973	Mike Connors, Mr. Blackwell, Lee Trevino, Marcel Marceau	Ronny Graham
Desk- Ed shows a clipping from a 1938 newspaper in which Johnny's picture appears.
2624	January 8, 1973	Sammy Davis Jr., Shecky Greene	N/A
Desk- Johnny tells about a snowman being stolen from in front of his house in Encino.
2625	January 9, 1973	George Segal, Don Rickles, Susan Saint James	Peter Nero
Desk- "The Rights Of a Hospital Patient"; Ed's 'Cheer' Commercial (20 Years Ago)
2626	January 10, 1973	Tony Curtis, Charles Nelson Reilly	N/A
Mighty Carson Art Players- "The Vikings"; Desk- "The Best Antics of the NFL During Last Season"
2627	January 11, 1973	Michael Caine, Pat McCormick	Connie Stevens ("Let Me Be the One" and "You've Made Me So Very Happy"), Ella Fitzgerald, Larry Kert
Sketch- "Robert Blevins- Astronaut"
2628	January 12, 1973	Karen Valentine, George Gobel, Redd Foxx	Joe Williams
Commercial Parodies: Milk Commercial, Hair Spray Commercial, and Auto Additive Commercial
2629	January 15, 1973	Liberace (guest host), Bob Hope, Shelley Winters	N/A
2630	January 16, 1973	Suzanne Pleshette, Tony Randall, Alex Karras	Roy Clark
Desk- "Calendar of Annual Events for 1973"
2631	January 17, 1973	Jack Benny, Rich Little, Dick Barlow, Roger Pida	Dylana Jenson
Desk- "Letters from Children Regarding Johnny Carson"
2632	January 18, 1973	Ernest Borgnine, Carol Lynley, John Williams	Artie Shaw, Eubie Blake
2633	January 19, 1973	James Caan, Florence Henderson, Karen Black, Frank Shorter, Kipchoge Keino	N/A
2634	January 22, 1973	Dom DeLuise (guest host), Dr. Irwin Maxwell Stillman	N/A
2635	January 23, 1973	Joan Embery, Joan Rivers, George Maharis	Bobby Goldsboro
Carnac the Magnificent
2636	January 24, 1973	Elke Sommer, Billie Jean King, Brian Bressler, Dr. Champion Teutsch	Harry Chapin
2637	January 25, 1973	Brian Keith, Joe Flynn	John Denver ("Rocky Mountain High")
Desk- "It's The Law"
2638	January 26, 1973	Cass Elliot (guest host), Charles Grodin, Frances Sayer	Pat Boone, Ronny Graham, The New Seekers
Desk- "T.V. Guide Synopses"
2639	January 29, 1973	Cass Elliot (guest host), Tony Curtis, Virginia Graham	Bobby Darin
2640	January 30, 1973	Jerry Lewis (guest host)	Kaye Ballard, The Lettermen
2641	January 31, 1973	Jerry Lewis (guest host), Charles Nelson Reilly	Jose Molina, Della Reese

=== February ===
No.	Original release date	Guest(s)	Musical/entertainment guest(s)
2642	February 1, 1973	Jerry Lewis (guest host), Cloris Leachman, Jan Murray, Pat Hollis, Stan Kann	N/A
2643	February 2, 1973	Jerry Lewis (guest host), Louis Nye, Sarah Kennedy	Ike & Tina Turner, Bobby Vinton
2644	February 5, 1973	Jerry Lewis (guest host), Patti Deutsch, Fernando Lamas	Annette Thomas
2645	February 6, 1973	Joan Embery, Orson Bean	Bobby Darin, Seals and Crofts
El Mouldo
2646	February 7, 1973	James Stewart, Charles Durning, Charles Schulz	Charlie Brown Group, Kenny Rankin
Desk- "Ways a Man Can Please a Woman"
2647	February 8, 1973	Muhammad Ali, Robert Blake, Carol Wayne	Roger Miller - "(The Day I Jumped) From Uncle Harvey's Plane" and "Oo-De-Lally"
Mighty Carson Art Players- "The Poseidon Thing"
2648	February 9, 1973	George Gobel	Paul Williams ("Here's That Rainy Day"), Paula Kelly
Sketch- "Mayoral Candidate- Henry Kalman Interview"
2649	February 12, 1973	Truman Capote, McLean Stevenson, Detective Dave Toma	Mel Tormé
Desk- "Ripley's Believe It or Not"
2650	February 13, 1973	George Burns, Sammy Davis Jr., Carl Reiner	Sammy Davis Jr. performed ("In the Still of the Night" and "The Lady Is a Tramp"), Honey Cone
Desk- "Letters from Children Describing Ed McMahon"
2651	February 14, 1973	Evel Knievel, Bob Newhart, Charles Grodin, Dr. Laurence J. Peter	Johnny Mathis
2652	February 15, 1973	George Foreman, Sandy Duncan, Steve Martin, Binnie Barnes	N/A
Demonstration- "Unusual Inventions"
2653	February 16, 1973	Rex Harrison, George Carlin, Chet Huntley	Doc Severinsen & The Tonight Show Band ("Last Tango in Paris")
Biggest Chicken
2654	February 19, 1973	Rex Reed, Robert Klein, Carl Jackson	Anne Murray, Glen Campbell
Desk- "Spin Offs of Current Movies"
2655	February 20, 1973	Lawrence Welk, Dr. Laurence J. Peter	Ronny Graham
Desk- "Interview with Pretzel Maker- Esther Miller"
2656	February 21, 1973	Fernando Lamas, Brian Bressler, Dr. Esther Vilar	N/A
Desk- "Strange Bumper Stickers in California"; Stump the Band
2657	February 22, 1973	Don Rickles, Elliott Gould, Harris Nelson	Ethel Ennis
Demonstration- "Strange Instruments with Harris Nelson"
2658	February 23, 1973	McLean Stevenson, Joseph Wambaugh, Carol Lynley	Harry Chapin
Desk- "Comments About the Earthquake"
2659	February 26, 1973	David Brenner, Ross Martin, Eddie Campos, Paul Williams	Talya Ferro
2660	February 27, 1973	Buddy Hackett, Marcel Marceau	Hurricane Smith, Nancy Wilson
2661	February 28, 1973	Albert Brooks, Suzy Chaffee, William Demarest	N/A

=== March ===
No.	Original release date	Guest(s)	Musical/entertainment guest(s)
2662	March 1, 1973	Diana Ross, Charles Grodin	Pat Boone performed ("Golden Rocket" and "Begin to Be Free")
Carnac the Magnificent
2663	March 2, 1973	Suzanne Pleshette, Shirley Luthman, Russell Voisin	Trini Lopez
Desk- "Questions Determining the End of a Relationship"
2664	March 5, 1973	Jack Lemmon, Mamie Van Doren	Linda Hopkins ("Seven Days and Nights" and "Ease Away"), Ace Trucking Company
Desk- "Spring Cleaning"
2665	March 6, 1973	Dom DeLuise, Sally Kellerman, Ronnie Schell, Bruno Vailati	N/A
Desk- "Ed McMahon's 50th Birthday"
2666	March 7, 1973	Euell Gibbons, Jerzy Kosinski	Ronny Graham, Bobby Goldsboro
Desk- "Celebrating Ed McMahon's Birthday"
2667	March 8, 1973	Jonathan Winters, Joan Rivers, Dr. Irwin Maxwell Stillman	Judy Collins
2668	March 9, 1973	Marlo Thomas, Carol Wayne, James Hampton	Joel Grey
Desk- "Johnny's Trip to Mexico"; Mighty Carson Art Players- "Jack LaStrain"
2669	March 12, 1973	Joey Bishop (guest host), Totie Fields, Joe Frazier, Bill Shoemaker	Enzo Stuarti, Larry Kert
2670	March 13, 1973	Joey Bishop (guest host), Shelley Winters, Richard Boone	Stiller and Meara, Jose Molina
2671	March 14, 1973	Joey Bishop (guest host), Ross Martin, Allan Drake, Detective Dave Toma, Sarah Kennedy	Kaye Stevens
2672	March 15, 1973	Joey Bishop (guest host), Steve Allen, Foster Brooks, Cleveland Amory	James Brown, Lyn Collins
2673	March 16, 1973	Joey Bishop (guest host), Burl Ives, Carol Lawrence, Allan Drake, Stan Kann, Lynda Day George, Roger Jacobs	N/A
2674	March 19, 1973	Joey Bishop (guest host), Carroll O'Connor, Ralph Pearl	Peggy Lee, Tommy Leonetti
2675	March 20, 1973	Bob Newhart, Erich Segal	Larry Kert, Vikki Carr
Desk- "Battle Plan for Women in Combating the High Price of Food"
2676	March 21, 1973	Florence Henderson, Steve Martin, Candice Bergen	N/A
2677	March 22, 1973	John Wayne, Charles Grodin, Danny Thomas, The Amazing Randi	John O'Banion ("My Melancholy Baby")
Desk- "New Laws for California"
2678	March 23, 1973	Bob Hope, Mitzi Gaynor, Rodney Dangerfield, Bruno Vailati	Beverly Sills
Mighty Carson Art Players- Takeoff of 'Kung Fu'
2679	March 26, 1973	Vikki Carr (guest host), Buck Henry, Professor Backwards, Victor Buono	Kris Kristofferson, Rita Coolidge
2680	March 28, 1973	Robert Blake, Putt Mossman	Bee Gees ("Wouldn't I Be Someone", "Saw a New Morning" and "Massachusetts")
Carnac the Magnificent
2681	March 29, 1973	Charlton Heston, Rex Reed, Richard Bach	Eubie Blake
2682	March 30, 1973	Buddy Hackett, McLean Stevenson, John Kidner, Brady Watt	N/A
Desk- "Newspaper Articles Sent In From Viewers"

=== April ===
No.	Original release date	Guest(s)	Musical/entertainment guest(s)
2683	April 2, 1973	Kate Smith (guest host), Jean Stapleton, Charles Nelson Reilly	N/A
2684	April 3, 1973	Clint Eastwood, Robert Klein, Buddy Hackett, Telly Savalas, Lillian Williams	N/A
Desk- "Awards Given to Police Officers for Bravery"
2685	April 4, 1973	David Steinberg, Diane Keaton, Maury Wills	Mac Davis
Desk- "Sampling Beefburgers and Horseburgers"
2686	April 5, 1973	Eva Gabor, Foster Brooks, Susan George, George V. Higgins	Thelma Houston
Desk- "T.V. Guide Listings"
2687	April 6, 1973	Juliet Prowse, Sid Caesar, Richard Munizich	Johnnie Ray
Desk- "What Spring Is"
2688	April 9, 1973	Dom DeLuise (guest host), Gene Hackman, Binnie Barnes, Johnny Brown, Joseph N. Sorrentino, Debbie Drake	N/A
2689	April 10, 1973	Charles Grodin	Phyllis Newman, Roy Clark
Ed McMahon Gives His Version of His Accident (The boat lurched as he stepped off it. He had only two drinks.)
2690	April 11, 1973	Jerry Lewis, James Hampton, Alan Bursky	Julie Budd
Desk- "Various Diets in Vogue"
2691	April 12, 1973	Joan Rivers, Jon Voight, Bob Uecker, Phillip Stern	Joe Williams
Desk- "Baseball Cliches"
2692	April 13, 1973	Ricardo Montalbán, David Smith	Buddy Rich, Della Reese, Monti Rock
Desk- "Phobias"
2693	April 16, 1973	Shecky Greene (guest host), Jack Klugman, Luciana Paluzzi, Bill Shoemaker	N/A
2694	April 17, 1973	Bob Hope, Karen Valentine, Jack Wright	Jack Jones
Desk- "Meat Boycott- Horse Meat"
2695	April 18, 1973	Robert Blake	Artie Shaw, Ronny Graham
Desk- Johnny talks about going to a party where James Cagney was present.
2696	April 19, 1973	Susan Saint James, Robert Shaw, Kreskin	Now Generation Brass and Today's Children
New Products
2697	April 20, 1973	Shecky Greene (guest host), John Davidson, Cliff Robertson	Ray Charles, Ace Trucking Company
2698	April 23, 1973	Vikki Carr (guest host), Michael Landon, Steve Martin, David Hartman, Doug Sanders	Austin Roberts
2699	April 24, 1973	Don Rickles (guest host), Red Buttons, Lee Marvin, James Darren	Eartha Kitt
2700	April 25, 1973	Don Rickles (guest host), Fernando Lamas, Rich Little, Joel Rapp, Lynn Rapp, Richard Crenna	Peter Lemongello
2701	April 26, 1973	Don Rickles (guest host), Steve Allen, Cloris Leachman, Bobby Riggs	Jerry Vale
2702	April 27, 1973	Don Rickles (guest host), Sally Struthers, Otto Preminger, Bobby Winkles, Steve Martin	Pearl Bailey, Peter Lemongello
2703	April 30, 1973	Don Rickles (guest host), Bob Newhart, Charles Nelson Reilly, Telly Savalas, Corbett Monica, John Parisella	N/A

=== May ===
No.	Original release date	Guest(s)	Musical/entertainment guest(s)
2704	May 1, 1973	Joan Embery, Dub Taylor	Larry Kert, Lola Falana
Desk- "Ripley's Believe It or Not"
2705	May 2, 1973	Ben Gazzara, Margot Kidder, Jacqueline Susann, James Darren	N/A
2706	May 3, 1973	Dom DeLuise, Bruce Dern, Melvin Belli	Pat Boone
2707	May 4, 1973	McLean Stevenson, Sandy Duncan, James Hampton	Robert Goulet
Stump the Band
2708	May 7, 1973	(FROM NEW YORK CITY) Shelley Winters, Rodney Dangerfield, Pete Hamill, Marcel Marceau	Linda Hopkins
Desk- "Talk with Ed" (Johnny and Ed talk about being back in New York City. Johnny told of riding with a cabby who give him a tour of the potholes in the streets.)
2709	May 8, 1973	(FROM NEW YORK CITY) James Coco, Rex Reed, Gabriel Kaplan, Barry Bostwick, Ilene Graff	Richie Havens
Johnny talked about the New York Knicks.
2710	May 9, 1973	(FROM NEW YORK CITY) Debbie Reynolds, Jerzy Kosinski, Pelé	Harry Chapin
Stump the Band
2711	May 10, 1973	(FROM NEW YORK CITY) Tony Randall, Elizabeth Martineau	Glynis Johns ("Send In The Clowns"), Eubie Blake
2712	May 11, 1973	(FROM NEW YORK CITY) Charles Grodin, E.G. Marshall, Michael Preminger	Buddy Rich
2713	May 14, 1973	(FROM NEW YORK CITY) Ryan O'Neal, Tatum O'Neal, Peter Bogdanovich, Jerry Lucas	Ace Trucking Company
2714	May 15, 1973	(FROM NEW YORK CITY) Robert Blake, Michele Lee, Myron Cohen	Tommy Tune
2715	May 16, 1973	(FROM NEW YORK CITY) Shecky Greene, Orson Bean, Barry Newman, Paul Williams	N/A
Desk- "Rebuttal to a Letter from Morticans"
2716	May 17, 1973	(FROM NEW YORK CITY) Muhammad Ali, Jack Albertson, Marty Brill, Kreskin	Marilyn Maye
2717	May 18, 1973	(FROM NEW YORK CITY) Christopher Plummer, Art Carney, Sid Caesar, Gunther Gebel-Williams	Kelly Garrett ("Do You Remember These?")
2718	May 21, 1973	(FROM NEW YORK CITY) Bob Uecker, Alexis Smith, Dick Shawn	Judy Collins, The Lettermen
Desk- "Jealously Among the Aging"
2719	May 22, 1973	(FROM NEW YORK CITY) Joan Rivers, McLean Stevenson, Don Murray, Dr. Irwin Maxwell Stillman	Lana Cantrell
Desk- "Westbury Appearances"
2720	May 23, 1973	(FROM NEW YORK CITY) Faye Dunaway, James Hampton	Phyllis McGuire, Phyllis Newman, The New Seekers
2721	May 24, 1973	(FROM NEW YORK CITY) Sammy Davis Jr., Phyllis Diller, Sarah Miles	N/A
Stump the Band
2722	May 25, 1973	(FROM NEW YORK CITY) Mayor John Lindsay, David Brenner	Peter Nero
Last ever show from New York City during Carson's tenure.
2723	May 28, 1973	Bill Cosby (guest host), Groucho Marx, Bill Russell, Jo Anne Worley, Foster Brooks	Fairmount Street Singers
2724	May 29, 1973	Bill Cosby (guest host), Richard Pryor, Billie Jean King, Michele Carey, Hugh Hefner	Erroll Garner
Bill Cosby and his partner performs a "Garbage Man" routine.
2725	May 30, 1973	John Davidson (guest host), Karen Valentine	Jim Croce, Peter Marshall
2726	May 31, 1973	John Davidson (guest host), Patti Deutsch, Sarah Kennedy, Cloris Leachman, Sally Field	Dusty Springfield

=== June ===
No.	Original release date	Guest(s)	Musical/entertainment guest(s)
2727	June 1, 1973	Tony Curtis (guest host), Joe Flynn, Jack Lemmon	Sergio Mendes & Brasil '66
2728	June 4, 1973	Ernest Borgnine	Della Reese
2729	June 5, 1973	Robert Shaw, Robert Klein, Margot Kidder, Mayor Tom Bradley	Dick Haymes
2730	June 6, 1973	Albert Brooks, Charles Nelson Reilly, Joseph N. Sorrentino	Gerri Granger, Pat Boone
2731	June 7, 1973	Bob Hope, Joe Flynn, Martin Poriss	Barbara McNair, Monti Rock
Stump the Band
2732	June 8, 1973	Don Rickles, Elke Sommer, Richard Crenna, Roberta Teitel	José Feliciano
2733	June 11, 1973	John Denver (guest host), Jill St. John, Mark Spitz, Suzy Spitz, Rosey Grier, Denise Nicholas	N/A
2734	June 12, 1973	Robert Blake, Jaye P. Morgan	Larry Kert
2735	June 13, 1973	Joan Rivers, Reverend Billy Graham, Joseph N. Sorrentino	Peter Gordeno
2736	June 14, 1973	Lorne Greene, Gabriel Kaplan, Charles Grodin, Dub Taylor, Patty Lynch	N/A
2737	June 15, 1973	George Gobel, Carol Wayne, Charlie Callas, Dr. Irwin Maxwell Stillman	Eloise Laws ("Love Factory" and "It's Not An Easy Thing to Do")
2738	June 18, 1973	Joey Bishop (guest host), Telly Savalas, Michael Callan, Marcia Seligson	Charo
2739	June 19, 1973	Joey Bishop (guest host)	Teresa Brewer
2740	June 20, 1973	Joey Bishop (guest host), Danny Thomas, Lorna Luft, Redd Foxx	Rod McKuen
2741	June 21, 1973	Joey Bishop (guest host), Dr. Joyce Brothers, Jack Klugman, Georgie Kaye	Abbe Lane
2742	June 22, 1973	Joey Bishop (guest host), Barry Bostwick, George Maharis, Cleveland Amory, Candice Earley, Sarah Kennedy	Johnny Mann
2743	June 25, 1973	Joey Bishop (guest host), Fernando Lamas, Leonard Barr, Carroll O'Connor, Nancy O'Connor, Ron Moody	N/A
2744	June 26, 1973	Joey Bishop (guest host), Norm Crosby, Totie Fields, Carol Lawrence, Roger Moore	N/A
2745	June 27, 1973	Joey Bishop (guest host), Charles Nelson Reilly, Helen Gurley Brown, Foster Brooks	Della Reese
Audience Talent Contest with Joey Bishop
2746	June 28, 1973	Joey Bishop (guest host), Binnie Barnes, Stan Kann	Charo, Monty Python
2747	June 29, 1973	Joey Bishop (guest host), George Foreman, Sarah Kennedy	Ed Ames, Jim Nabors

=== July ===
No.	Original release date	Guest(s)	Musical/entertainment guest(s)
2748	July 2, 1973	George Burns, Loretta Swit, Shecky Greene, Ross Martin, Don Grady	N/A
2749	July 3, 1973	Joan Embery, Shecky Greene, Rex Reed	Lola Falana
2750	July 4, 1973	Sammy Davis Jr., Mickey Rooney, Florence Henderson, Pam Grier	N/A
Desk- Johnny tells a story about firecrackers.
2751	July 5, 1973	Michael Landon, Alan Bursky, Chuck Norris, Phillip Paley, Robert Wall, Bruno Vailati	Mac Davis
Desk- Johnny reads an article regarding Reverend Rex Humbard.
2752	July 6, 1973	Joan Rivers, Shelley Winters, McLean Stevenson	Gerri Granger
Desk- "Fan Mail"
2753	July 9, 1973	Sandy Duncan (guest host), Bob Hope	Kaye Ballard
2754	July 10, 1973	Orson Bean, Candice Bergen, Pam Grier	N/A
2755	July 11, 1973	Ben Gazzara, David Steinberg, Merle Oberon	Johnny Mathis
2756	July 12, 1973	Bob Newhart, Ronald J. Fields	Larry Kert, The Pointer Sisters
Stump the Band
2757	July 13, 1973	James Garner, Rodney Dangerfield, Alan Lakein	Roberta Flack ("Killing Me Softly" and "Just Like a Woman")
The NBC Orchestra performs "What Have They Done to My Song?"
2758	July 16, 1973	Shecky Greene (guest host), Fernando Lamas, Dr. Irwin Maxwell Stillman	Guy Marks, Jack Jones, Charo
2759	July 17, 1973	Paul Williams, Dick Shawn, Eddie Campos	Ronny Graham
Desk- Johnny and Doc talk about their weekends.
2760	July 18, 1973	Robert Blake, Dorothy Uhnak	Chet Atkins, Phyllis Newman
Carnac the Magnificent
2761	July 19, 1973	Buddy Hackett, David Carradine	Beverly Sills
Desk- "Watergate Memorabilia"
2762	July 20, 1973	Jack Benny, Elke Sommer, Joe Namath	N/A
Desk- "How to Tell When You're in Phase IV", Desk- Doc Severinsen chews & spits tobacco.
2763	July 23, 1973	Vikki Carr (guest host), Ruth Gordon, Nolan Ryan, Ruth Ryan	Burns & Schreiber (Jack Burns and Avery Schreiber), Sergio Mendes and Brasil '66
2764	July 24, 1973	Foster Brooks, Strother Martin	N/A
2765	July 25, 1973	Cloris Leachman, Marty Brill, Gail Parent, Tamara Dobson	N/A
2766	July 26, 1973	Sammy Davis Jr., Rip Taylor	N/A
2767	July 27, 1973	Barbara Howar	Dionne Warwick
2768	July 30, 1973	Jerry Lewis (guest host), Professor Backwards, Otto Preminger, David Brenner, Jim Brown	N/A
2769	July 31, 1973	Tony Randall, Billie Jean King, Carol Wayne, Gunther Gebel-Williams	N/A
Mighty Carson Art Players- "Tea-Time Movie"

=== August ===
No.	Original release date	Guest(s)	Musical/entertainment guest(s)
2770	August 1, 1973	Ricardo Montalbán, Laura Bergt, Fred Titus, Lester Bodfish, Reggie Joule, Roger Kunayak, Uri Geller	N/A
Desk- "Commercially Oriented Greeting Cards"
2771	August 2, 1973	Dom DeLuise, Edy Williams, Bob Rosefsky	The Three Degrees
Desk- "How To Save Energy"
2772	August 3, 1973	McLean Stevenson, Don Rickles, Don Adams, Carol Wayne	Harry Belafonte
Desk- "The Meaning of Body Language"; Stump the Band
2773	August 6, 1973	John Davidson (guest host), Sally Struthers, David Frye, Marjoe Gortner	Lana Cantrell, Leslie Uggams
2774	August 7, 1973	Fernando Lamas, Diana Rigg, Dorothy Uhnak	Gerri Granger
Desk- "Carson's High School Memories"
2775	August 8, 1973	Earl Holliman, George Gobel, Henry Hite, Bob Rosefsky	Billy Preston
2776	August 9, 1973	Jack Palance, Victoria Principal, Gabriel Kaplan, Bobby Riggs	Linda Hopkins
2777	August 10, 1973	Joey Bishop, Marty Brill, Carol Lynley	Mac Davis
Desk- Johnny and Ed discuss the 'water' incident from the previous night.
2778	August 13, 1973	Shecky Greene (guest host), Richard Crenna, Bobby Sandler	Jose Molina, Della Reese, Mel Tormé
2779	August 14, 1973	James Garner, Pete DePaolo	Larry Kert, Roger Miller
Desk- "Uncommon Mistakes"
2780	August 15, 1973	Robert Blake, Alex Karras, Senator William Proxmire	Trini Lopez
Desk- "Odds and Ends"
2781	August 16, 1973	Tom Weiskopf, Jo Ann Pflug, Rich Little, Victor Buono	N/A
2782	August 17, 1973	Orson Bean, Victoria Principal, Edie Steinmetz	Dean Scott and Group
Desk- "Pictures from Burbank Natural History Museum"
2783	August 20, 1973	Joey Bishop (guest host), Redd Foxx, Pam Grier	Charo
2784	August 21, 1973	Joey Bishop (guest host), Stanley Myron Handelman, Helen Gurley Brown, Henry Fonda, Bob Melvin	Leslie Uggams
2785	August 22, 1973	Joey Bishop (guest host), Jack Klugman, Marcel Marceau, Stan Kann	N/A
2786	August 23, 1973	Joey Bishop (guest host), Charlton Heston	Bobby Goldsboro
2787	August 24, 1973	Joey Bishop (guest host), Laurence Harvey, Irwin C. Watson	Rod McKuen
2788	August 27, 1973	Joey Bishop (guest host), Steve Allen, Dr. Joyce Brothers	N/A
2789	August 28, 1973	Joey Bishop (guest host), Mickey Rooney	Eartha Kitt
2790	August 29, 1973	Joey Bishop (guest host), Fernando Lamas, Mickey Rooney, Rip Taylor, Michael Roessler, Lou Marett, Mark Spitz	Liz Torres
2791	August 30, 1973	Joey Bishop (guest host), Yul Brynner, George Kirby, Dr. Irwin Maxwell Stillman	Abbe Lane
Audience Talent Contest
2792	August 31, 1973	Joey Bishop (guest host), Leonard Barr, Nipsey Russell, Stephanie Edwards, Cleveland Amory	Jerry Vale

=== September ===
No.	Original release date	Guest(s)	Musical/entertainment guest(s)
2793	September 3, 1973	Joey Bishop (guest host), Danny Thomas, Don Rickles, John DeLorean, Jan Murray	Mills Brothers
2794	September 4, 1973	McLean Stevenson, Olivia Hussey	The 5th Dimension
Carnac the Magnificent
2795	September 5, 1973	Buddy Rich, Cathy Rich, Sandy Duncan, Kreskin	Roy Clark
Desk- "How Long Will You Live"
2796	September 6, 1973	Glen Campbell, Don Rickles, Dom DeLuise, Jimmy Breslin	Campbell ("Back Home Again in Indiana")
Desk- "Los Angeles Historical Society Mementos"
2797	September 7, 1973	Muhammad Ali, Ken Norton, Karen Valentine, Carol Wayne	Joel Grey
Mighty Carson Art Players- "Tibet Your Life"
2798	September 10, 1973	Sammy Davis Jr. (guest host), Rodney Allen Rippy, Sam Levenson	Gladys Knight & The Pips, Lola Falana
2799	September 11, 1973	William Holden, Joan Rivers, Bruno Vailati	Gran Picasso
Desk- "Super Market Survival Manual"
2800	September 12, 1973	Joan Embery, David Steinberg, Joseph Wambaugh	Bette Midler
2801	September 13, 1973	Dom DeLuise, Gabriel Kaplan, Ron Leibman	Thelma Houston
Desk- "T.V. Listings of Syndicated Network Shows"
2802	September 14, 1973	Richard Benjamin, Carol Wayne, Bob Rosefsky	James Brown performed ("Slaughter's Theme Song" and "If I Ruled the World")
Desk- "Ripley's Believe It or Not"
2803	September 17, 1973	David Steinberg (guest host), Buddy Hackett, Tom Smothers	Peter Allen
2804	September 18, 1973	Tony Randall, Ozzie Nelson, Harriet Nelson, Jerry Van Dyke, William Peter Blatty	N/A
Desk- "How Not to Be Mugged"
2805	September 19, 1973	Richard Pryor, Douglas Morrow, Shimada (illusionist), Miss Texas Judy Mallett	Roberta Linn ("A House is Not a Home")
Desk- "Expression Cards Based on 'I Love You'"
2806	September 20, 1973	Orson Bean, Carol Lynley, Rick Segall	Harry Chapin, Monti Rock
Desk- "Childrens Name In Newspaper"; Desk- "Fire Department in Wells, Maine"
2807	September 21, 1973	Fernando Lamas, David Brenner, Adelle Davis	Cleo Laine
Stump the Band
2808	September 24, 1973	John Denver (guest host), George Maharis, Shari Lewis, Werner Erhard, Bill Dana	Bill Danoff, Taffy Danoff
2809	September 25, 1973	Bob Hope, Diana Rigg, Larry Csonka, Jim Kiick	Roy Clark
Carnac the Magnificent
2810	September 26, 1973	Robert Blake, Rodney Dangerfield, Joe Flynn	Richie Havens
Desk- "Los Angeles Police Department Valor Medal Winners"; Desk- "Burbank Valor Awards"
2811	September 27, 1973	Vincent Price, Barbara Howar, Jeanne Trepanier	Cass Elliot, John O'Banion
Desk- "Bonzo Pictures" (directed by Fred de Cordova)
2812	September 28, 1973	Michael Landon, Wilt Chamberlain	Johnny Mathis
Desk- "Astronauts Duties While in Space"

=== October ===
No.	Original release date	Guest(s)	Musical/entertainment guest(s)
2813	October 1, 1973	Red Buttons	Jose Molina, Sandler & Young, Loretta Lynn
2814	October 2, 1973	Buddy Hackett, Burt Reynolds, Don Rickles, Carol Wayne	N/A
The 11th anniversary of Johnny's show is celebrated, with a surprise appearance by Dean Martin; Mighty Carson Art Players present Tea Time Movie
2815	October 3, 1973	Bob Uecker, Cheryl Ladd, Gina Lollobrigida, James McEachin	John O'Banion
Desk- "List of Acts That Performed on The Tonight Show That Weren't Successful"
2816	October 4, 1973	Dennis Weaver, McLean Stevenson, Erich von Daniken	Liberace
Desk- "Celebration of Bobby Quinn's Birthday" (showing Bobby in the control room.)
2817	October 5, 1973	Peter Falk, Robert Klein, Victoria Principal, Linda Monteleone	N/A
Desk- "Proverbs To Live By"
2818	October 8, 1973	Joey Bishop (guest host), George Kennedy, Fernando Lamas, John Davidson, Helen Gurley Brown, Irwin C. Watson	Gerri Granger
2819	October 9, 1973	Joey Bishop (guest host), Dr. Joyce Brothers, Allan Drake	Mel Tillis
2820	October 10, 1973	Joey Bishop (guest host), Stephanie Edwards	Della Reese
2821	October 11, 1973	Joey Bishop (guest host), Dom DeLuise, Stanley Myron Handelman, Cleveland Amory	Charo
Audience Talent Contest
2822	October 12, 1973	Joey Bishop (guest host), Jan Murray, Rip Taylor	N/A
2823	October 15, 1973	Joey Bishop (guest host), Jack Lemmon, Karen Black	Peter Marshall
2824	October 16, 1973	George Burns, Billie Jean King, Carol Channing	N/A
Desk- "NFL Film Clips"
2825	October 17, 1973	Jacqueline Bisset, Dick Shawn, William Demarest	Gladys Knight & The Pips
Desk- Johnny and Ed celebrate fifteen years as partners.
2826	October 18, 1973	TBA	N/A
2827	October 19, 1973	Rodney Allen Rippy, Paul Hampton, J.B. West	Lola Falana
Desk- "Motion Picture 'Spin-Offs'"
2828	October 22, 1973	Barbara Walters (guest host), Walter Matthau	Linda Hopkins
2829	October 23, 1973	Suzanne Pleshette	Vikki Carr, Ace Trucking Company
Stump the Band; Desk- "How Married People Can Fight Successfully"
2830	October 24, 1973	Kirk Douglas, Joan Rivers, Johnny Hart	Larry Kert
Aunt Blabby
2831	October 25, 1973	Richard Benjamin, Albert Brooks, Garson Kanin	Gerri Granger
2832	October 26, 1973	Carl Reiner, George Carlin, Bob Rosefsky	Tommy Leonetti
Mighty Carson Art Players- "Euell Gibson Sketch"
2833	October 29, 1973	John Davidson (guest host), Dom DeLuise, Lily Tomlin	Charo
2834	October 30, 1973	Richard Harris, Rich Little	Ronny Graham
Carnac the Magnificent
2835	October 31, 1973	Tony Randall, Sandy Duncan, George Gobel, Radu Florescu	N/A
Desk- "Superstitions"; Desk- "Things Kids Do at Halloween"

=== November ===
No.	Original release date	Guest(s)	Musical/entertainment guest(s)
2836	November 1, 1973	Elke Sommer, Gabriel Kaplan, Pete Hamill	Pat Boone
Desk- "Nixon Tapes"; Desk- "Holidays That Never Caught On"
2837	November 2, 1973	Victor Buono	Roger Miller
2838	November 5, 1973	Joey Bishop (guest host), Allan Drake	Sonny King, Gerri Granger
Audience Talent Contest
2839	November 6, 1973	Robert Blake, Martin Poriss	The Carpenters ("Superstar", "Rainy Days and Mondays", "Goodbye to Love" and "Mr. Guder")
Desk- "Blue Cards"
2840	November 7, 1973	Orson Bean, Stephanie Edwards	Wayne Newton
Stump the Band
2841	November 8, 1973	Fernando Lamas, Paul Williams	N/A
Desk- "Saving Fuel- 50 M.P.H. Speed Limit"; Desk- "Early Christmas Advertising"
2842	November 9, 1973	Alex Karras, Barbara Howar	Joan Baez
Desk- "50 M.P.H. on Freeways"; Desk- "T.V. Guide Descriptions"
2843	November 12, 1973	Karen Valentine (guest host), Bob Hope, John Davidson, Jo Ann Worley	N/A
2844	November 13, 1973	Jonathan Winters, Carol Lawrence, Bud Greenspan	N/A
Desk- Johnny and Ed talked about NBC being on the air for 24 hours to cover Princess Anne's wedding.
2845	November 14, 1973	Don Rickles, Leo Durocher, Olga Connolly	Monti Rock
Desk- "How to Pick Up Men"
2846	November 15, 1973	Charlie Callas, Dr. Paul Ehrlich	Diana Trask, Roy Clark
Desk- "NFL Film Clips"
2847	November 16, 1973	Dinah Shore, Joan Rivers, Ashley Montagu, Angie Bowie	N/A
Mighty Carson Art Players- "Football" (Johnny plays a referee)
2848	November 19, 1973	Steve Allen (guest host), Richard Dawson, Jayne Meadows	Charo
Steve Allen's debut as guest host.
2849	November 20, 1973	Henry Fonda, Myron Cohen	Erroll Garner
Desk- "How to Raise Taxes for The Government"; Desk- "Suggestions for Saving Energy"
2850	November 21, 1973	Tina Louise, Rodney Dangerfield, Gore Vidal	Robert Goulet
Desk- "Letters from Children Regarding Ed McMahon"
2851	November 22, 1973	Joan Embery, Buddy Hackett, Steve Martin	N/A
Desk- "Upcoming Holiday Season"
2852	November 23, 1973	Jack Palance, Victoria Principal, Michael Preminger, Stephen Birmingham	N/A
Desk- "Ripley's Believe It or Not"
2853	November 26, 1973	McLean Stevenson (guest host), Doris Day, Euell Gibbons	N/A
2854	November 27, 1973	Carl Reiner, Truman Capote, Jerry Van Dyke	Lennon Sisters
Carnac the Magnificent
2855	November 28, 1973	James Coco, John Davidson	N/A
Desk- "Gas Crisis"; Desk- "NFL Film Clips"
2856	November 29, 1973	Lorne Greene, David Brenner, Erich von Daniken	Lana Cantrell
Desk- "Letter From Viewer" (Johnny reads an item from Portland, Oregon newspaper about the 71-year-old man.); Mighty Carson Art Players- "The Man From Kakkalochie County" (or the 167-year-old man.)
2857	November 30, 1973	Rich Little, Dr. Carl Sagan, Matthew Margolis	Helen Reddy

=== December ===
No.	Original release date	Guest(s)	Musical/entertainment guest(s)
2858	December 3, 1973	David Steinberg (guest host), Steve Allen, Redd Foxx	N/A
2859	December 4, 1973	Tony Randall, Stockard Channing	Ronny Graham
Desk- "Noteworthy Newspaper Articles"
2860	December 5, 1973	Bruce Dern, Dick Shawn	Lola Falana
Desk- "What To Give The Man Who Has Everything"
2861	December 6, 1973	Sammy Davis Jr., Diane Keaton, Freddie Prinze	Sammy Davis Jr. ("In the Still of the Night", "I've Gotta Be Me", "Tie a Yellow Ribbon 'Round the Ole Oak Tree" and "Candy Man"), Diane Keaton performed "You Made Me Love You (I Didn't Want to Do It"), Louie Bellson ("Spacin' Home")
Desk- "Curses for 1973"
2862	December 7, 1973	McLean Stevenson, Vincent Gardenia, Larry Merchant	The Lockers, Beverly Sills
2863	December 10, 1973	Wayne Newton (guest host), Dom DeLuise, Jack Benny	Paul Anka
2864	December 11, 1973	Richard Harris, Barbara Howar, Dar Robinson	N/A
2865	December 12, 1973	Robert Blake, Kreskin	Roy Clark
New Products
2866	December 13, 1973	Shecky Greene, Kelly Monteith, Thalassa Cruso	Larry Kert
Desk- "Letters to Santa Claus"
2867	December 14, 1973	Cloris Leachman, Fernando Lamas	Ike & Tina Turner, Monti Rock
Stump the Band
2868	December 17, 1973	Steve Allen (guest host), Art Linkletter, Dom DeLuise	Charo, Skiles and Henderson
2869	December 18, 1973	Clint Eastwood, James Whitmore	Marilyn Horne
Mighty Carson Art Players- "Art Fern- Murray the Mailer"
2870	December 19, 1973	Hugh MacDonald (martial artist), McLean Stevenson, Tish Baldrige	Al Hirt
Desk- "Odds and Ends"
2871	December 20, 1973	Joan Rivers, Adrienne Barbeau, Gabriel Kaplan, George Plimpton	N/A
Desk- "Ed's Alligator" (Ed told of being in Florida and has an alligator in the pond in the back of his house.) Johnny also apologizes for telling a joke about psoriasis in the monologue a few weeks earlier.
2872	December 21, 1973	Orson Bean, Carol Wayne, Bud Greenspan	Lou Rawls
Aunt Blabby
2873	December 25, 1973	Jerry Lewis (guest host), Dr. Joyce Brothers	N/A
2874	December 26, 1973	Jerry Lewis (guest host), Sharon Farrell, Bernie Casey, Eddie Ryder	Freda Payne, Mel Tormé
2875	December 27, 1973	Jerry Lewis (guest host), Steve Martin, Suzanne Pleshette, Ernest Borgnine	N/A
2876	December 28, 1973	Rich Little (guest host), George Burns, Steve Allen, Phyllis Diller, Norm Crosby	N/A
Desk- "Predictions of 1974"
