= Laura Bergt =

Native American political activist from Alaska (1940–1984)

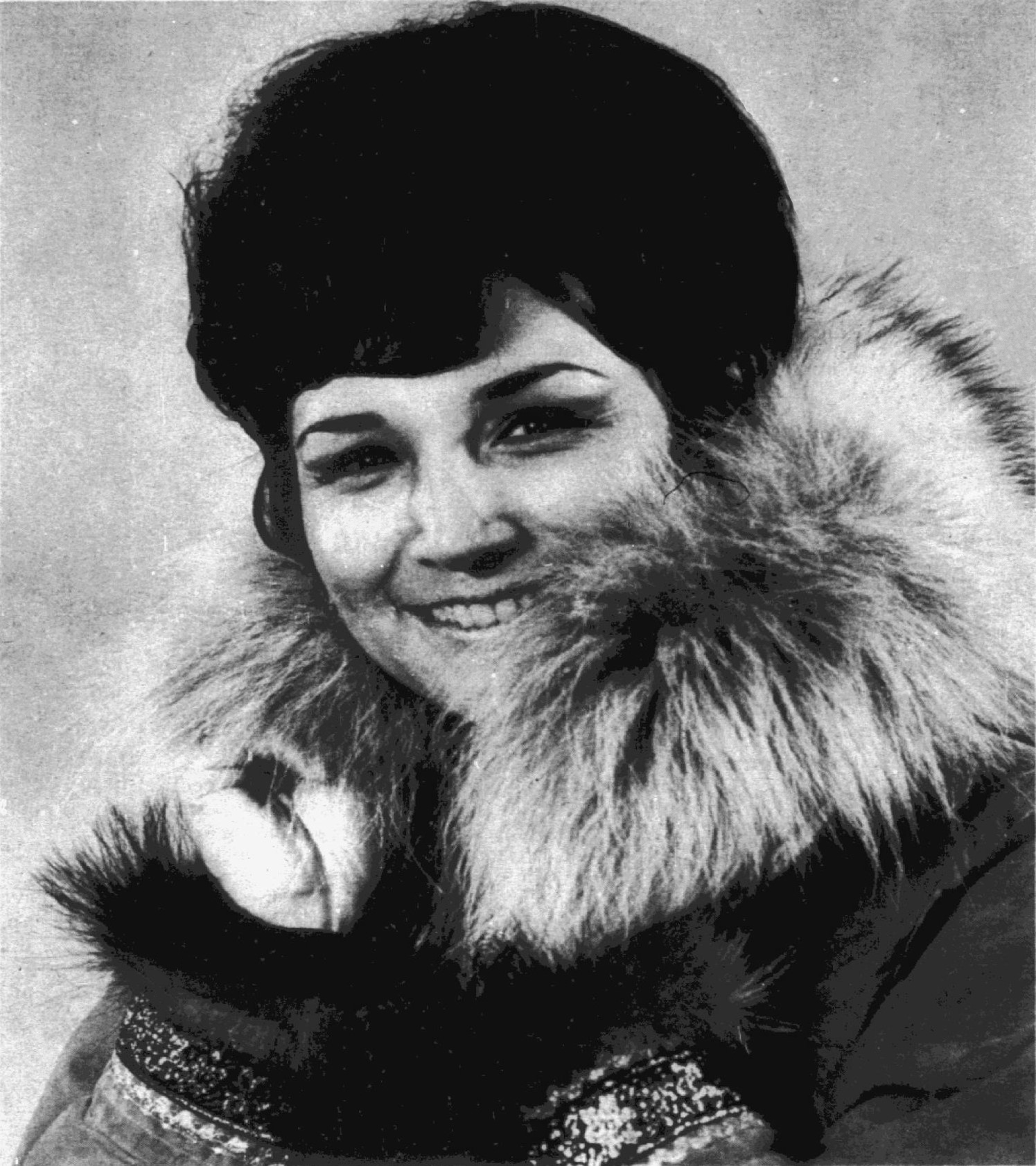
- Bergt in 1969
- Born: Laura Mae Beltz; October 1, 1940; Candle, Territory of Alaska, U.S.
- Died: March 14, 1984 (aged 43); Honolulu, Hawaii, U.S.
- Other names: Laura Beltz Bergt; Laura Mae Bergt; Laura Bergt Crockett
- Citizenship: Native Village of Kotzebue and US
- Occupations: Spokeswoman; political and Native rights activist
- Years active: 1960–1977

Laura Mae Bergt (née Beltz; October 1, 1940 – March 14, 1984) was an Iñupiaq athlete, model, politician, and activist for the Iñupiat and other Indigenous Alaskans. Born in the Northwest Arctic Borough of Alaska to biracial parents, she grew up in Nome and Kotzebue before attending high school in Sitka. Involved in the Native Olympic movement, she was both a nine-times winner of the Arctic Circle blanket toss event and served as chair of the World Eskimo Indian Olympics in 1966. She worked as a promoter for the new state of Alaska attending trade shows and making marketing appearances as a spokeswoman and guest on radio and television programs. From the 1960s, she worked in various policy positions at the tribal, local, state, and national level to address issues like disability, education, employment opportunities, housing, and poverty, and promoting the rights of Indigenous people.

In 1968, Bergt testified before the United States House of Representatives on the importance of settling Native claims to provide adequate funding for development of programs to address tribal issues and protect Indigenous hunting and fishing rights. Her personal relationship with Vice President Spiro Agnew and her appointment in 1970 to the National Council on Indian Opportunity were pivotal in obtaining passage of the Alaska Native Claims Settlement Act in 1971. In 1972, she was appointed by President Richard Nixon to serve on a national policy advisory committee of Indigenous leaders, and in 1975 participated on the 15-member National Health Advisory Committee. She also was commissioner of the Indian Arts and Crafts Board from 1976 to 1978 and was a member of President Gerald Ford's United States Bicentennial Council.

At the state level, Bergt was instrumental in pressing for the creation of schools to teach children with disabilities and preserve Native Arts. She served on various housing and rural development initiatives and chaired the World Eskimo Indian Olympics Committee in 1966 and 1967. She was elected in 1973 to a term on the Borough Assembly of the Fairbanks City Council. The sophomore-junior girls' dormitory at her alma mater, Mt. Edgecumbe High School, is named in her honor and she was the inaugural recipient of the Frank Whaley Award, which recognizes outstanding service to the Eskimo Olympics. In 2015, she was inducted into the Alaska Women's Hall of Fame.

== Early life and education ==
Laura Mae Beltz, whose Iñupiat name was "Mumiak", was born on October 1, 1940, in Candle, Alaska, to Iñupiat-German parents, Fredrica "Rica" (née Reich) and Bert Beltz. Her maternal grandmother, Mamie was a First Nations Canadian, who married Louis Reich, a German whaler. They operated a trading post in Kotzebue. Her paternal grandmother, Susie was a Native Alaskan, who married a Pennsylvania Dutch miner, John Skyles "Jack" Beltz. Her father was a bush pilot and a brother of Alaska Territorial Senator William Beltz. Beltz grew up in Nome and Kotzebue, where she attended elementary school. She graduated from Mt. Edgecumbe Boarding School in Sitka.

== Career ==
=== Early career, promoting Alaska (1957–1969) ===
After graduation, Beltz worked as a secretary to the Kotzebue station manager of Alaska Airlines, Neil Bergt. He was born in Tacoma, Washington, but raised and schooled in Anchorage before becoming a pilot. The couple married on November 5, 1958, in Kotzebue and had their daughter Debra Lynne in October 1959. They lived briefly in Point Barrow before relocating to Nome. In August 1959, Bergt appeared on the cover of Holiday promoting a featured article in the magazine focusing on the recent Statehood of Alaska. The exposure gave her international recognition and she was invited for several guest appearances on television, including on Lowell Thomas' High Adventure series, The Donald O'Connor Show, and The Ed Sullivan Show. In October 1960, she gave birth to twins, Michael Alan and Karen Gail, in Fairbanks and their youngest son, Bryan was born in 1965. That year, Neil became a partner in Interior Airways, where Bergt worked part time as a stewardess.

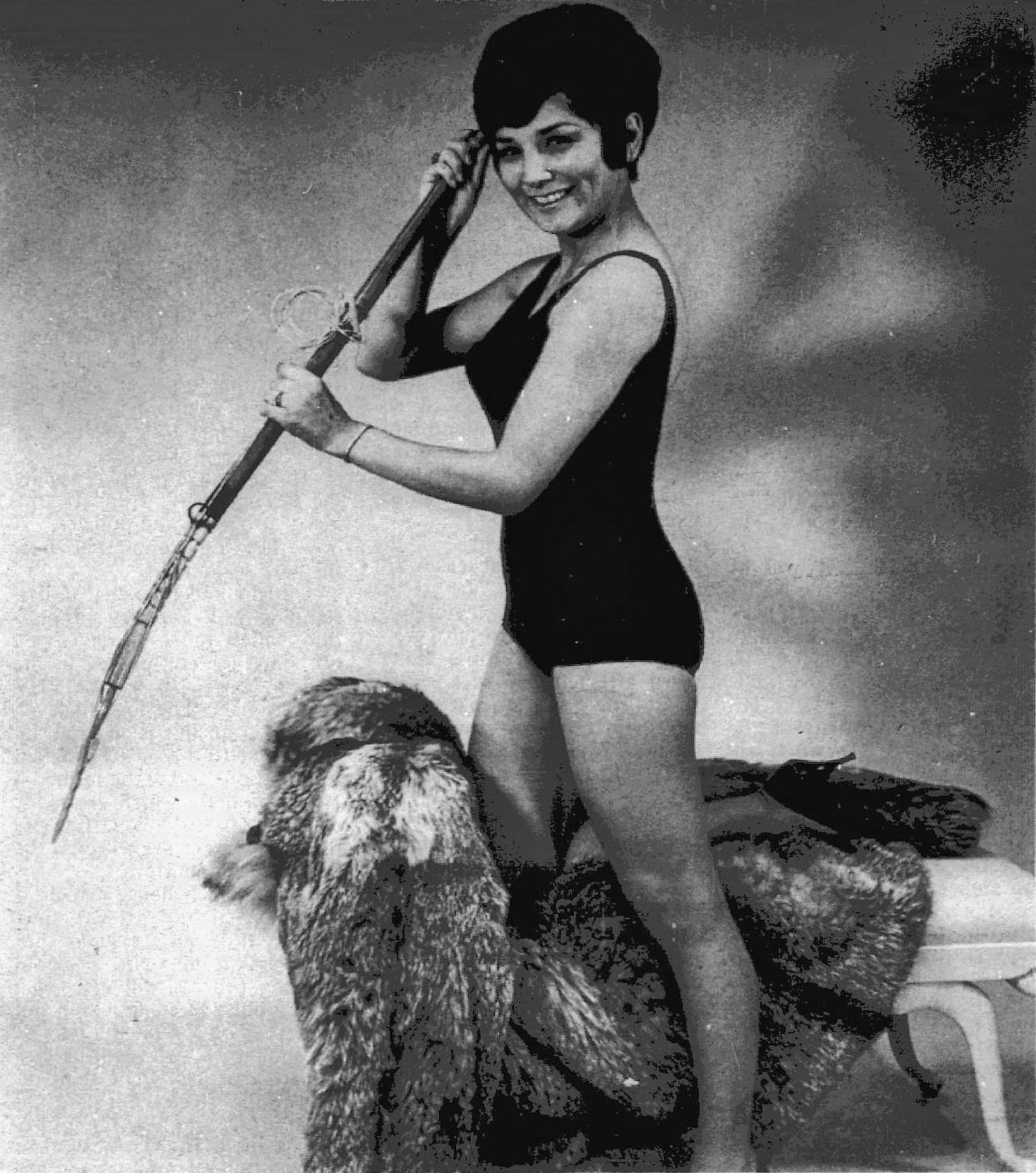
Bergt, modeling photograph 1969

In 1964, Bergt was elected as the national committeewoman from Alaska for the Young Republicans on which she served until 1966. She also served as an officer on the newly founded Cook Inlet Native Association. She worked as a secretary for the Fairbanks Chamber of Commerce and, in 1967, was appointed by the chamber to serve as the chair of the coordinating committee for the World Eskimo Indian Olympics. Bergt was a competitor in the games, having won the blanket toss nine times by 1969. She was reappointed as chair in 1967 and simultaneously appointed by Governor Walter Hickel to serve on the Native Claims Task Force and the special task force on Indigenous housing issues. In 1967, the family relocated from Fairbanks to Anchorage, when Neil took over the management of the office there for Interior Airways.

From 1968, Bergt worked with the tourism board, the Alaska Business Council, and the Alaska Oil and Gas Association, among other organizations, to promote the state, traveling to Costa Mesa, Century City, and Los Angeles, California, for the annual Alaska Travel and Trade Fair. At these events, she made public appearances at civic and fraternal gatherings, broadcast on television and radio, demonstrated Native sporting and skill events, and modeled traditional fashion and arts and crafts. She promoted Alaskan foods and culture, but also talked about issues for Native Alaskans such as the high mortality rates; ecology and environmental protection; housing struggles including the lack of electricity, sanitation, and running water; and limited educational opportunities. In 1969, the Bergts moved back to Fairbanks, when Neil was promoted to president of Interior Airways. Bergt worked as the office manager for the Alaska Federation of Natives and secretary to Emil Notti, president of the federation. She also worked for the Tundra Times and served as a director on the newspaper. In March 1970, she attended Expo '70 in Japan to promote Alaska.

=== Native affairs, land claims (1968–1972) ===
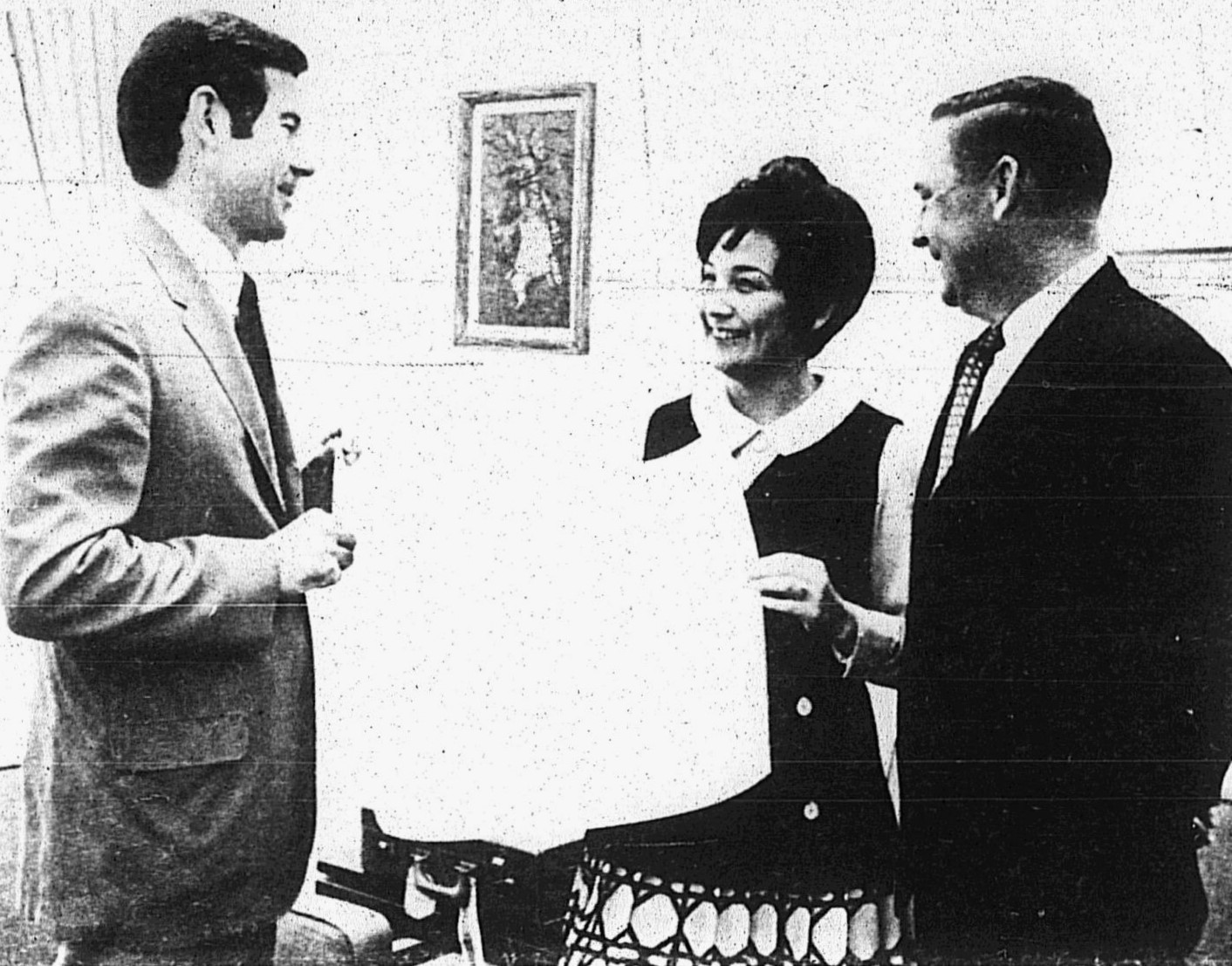
Bergt with officials of the National Council on Indian Opportunity in the office of the Vice President of the United States, 1970

In 1968, Bergt served as a member of the State Tourism Advisory Board, was on the Alaska state Committee on Children and Youth, Health, and Welfare (state chapter for the White House Conference on Children and Youth), and was appointed to the Alaska State Housing Authority Board. The board was responsible for managing the joint state-federal program to improve housing in rural villages. The same year, she was part of the first delegation to appear before the United States House's Subcommittee on Indian Affairs regarding settlement between the Indian Claims Commission and Native demands. The claims resulted from disputes over ownership and equitable settlement being paid by the state and federal governments for taking traditional Native land. The settlement was critical, as the Natives were asking for monetary amounts to be used for capital development, the creation of villages of their own, and protection of their hunting and fishing rights on federal lands. Since 1966, Stewart Udall, Secretary of the Interior, had halted any state land patents, impacting oil and gas leases proposed for the Trans-Alaska Pipeline System, until Native claims were settled. For the state, this meant a substantial loss of revenues. In her testimony, Bergt stressed that despite government programs, there were inadequate medical facilities and health services, difficulties of communication with remote villages, poor housing and sanitation, and extreme poverty among Indigenous people. She also testified in 1969 before the subcommittee calling for the creation of tribal corporations which would allow Native people to control and manage their own development and resources.

Bergt was invited to attend the inauguration of President Richard Nixon, who named her to join the National Council on Indian Opportunity (NCIO) in August 1970 for a two-year term. The NCIO was chaired by Vice President Spiro Agnew, whom she had met in 1968 during his trip campaigning in Alaska. That year, the Mt. Edgecumbe Boarding School named the sophomore-junior girls' dormitory in her honor. On July 8, 1970, Nixon delivered a speech reversing the government policy of tribal termination in favor of allowing their self-determination. Negotiations between the NCIO and the government produced seven bills by October to modify the federal and state roles with regard to Native people. One allowed Native authorities to sue the federal government if their interests in natural resources were damaged or jeopardized by governmental actions. Another permitted federal lending to tribal authorities, while one bill gave tribes the ability to manage federal programs and services, such as health, welfare and education projects for their communities. Two others allowed Indigenous people to transfer their civil service status if they changed from federal to tribal programs and to control livestock which trespassed on their lands. The speech also resulted in planning a conference to discuss the bills by the National Congress of American Indians in March 1971 in Kansas City, Missouri.

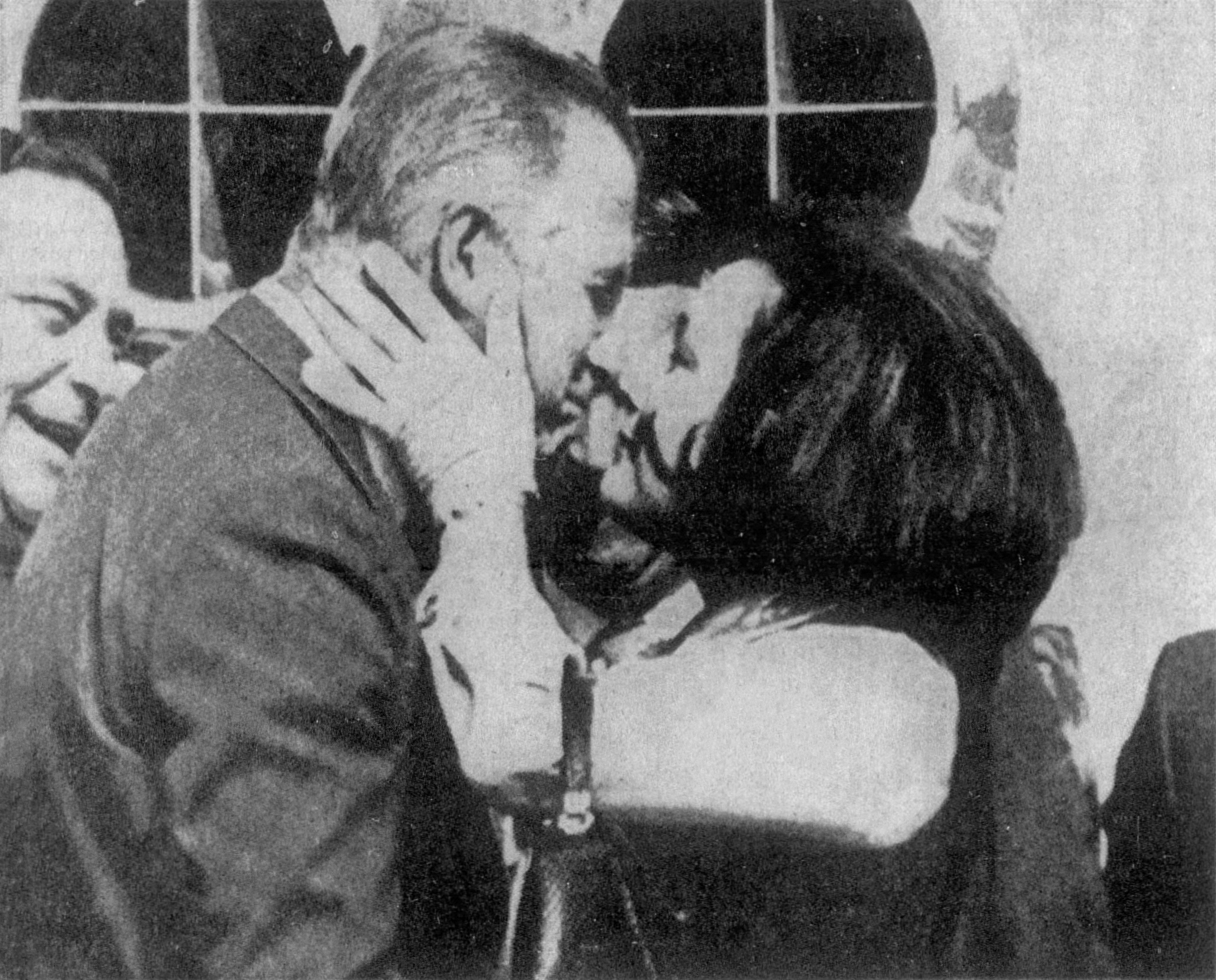
Bergt giving an Eskimo kiss to Vice President Spiro Agnew, 1971

During the Kansas City conference, Bergt taught Agnew how to Eskimo kiss. The kiss was widely publicized, and Tlingit leader, John Borbridge Jr watching her, said, "each one of those kisses was worth a million acres" for Native Alaskans. Bergt also urged Agnew to meet with Native leaders and the officials of the Interior Department, which was agreed would be held on March 12. Among those present were Agnew; Bergt; Raymond C. Christiansen, an Alaska State Senator; Al Ketzler, chair of the Tanana Chiefs Conference; Don Wright, president of the Alaska Federation of Natives; Fred Bracken, legal counsel for the Department of the Interior; Harrison Loesch, assistant Interior secretary; and Boyd Rasmussen, representing the Bureau of Land Management. From the Native perspective, according to Bergt, the meeting marked a turning-point in negotiations, as thereafter government authorities allowed their counsel to participate in the drafting of bills and gained a clear understanding of their demands for land and compensation. The American Indian Movement, pressure from oil companies, and on-going Native advocacy, resulted in the passage of the Alaska Native Claims Settlement Act in 1971. Bergt used her personal relationship with Agnew to continue pressing for focus on funding for educational training initiatives of Indigenous people during the post-settlement period.

=== Later career (1972–1983) ===
After her two-year appointment to the NCIO expired, Nixon asked her to serve on a six-member national committee of Indigenous leaders, which included Frank Belvin (Choctaw) of Muskogee, Oklahoma; Harold Shunck (Yankton-Sioux) of Rapid City, South Dakota; Neal McCaleb (Chickasaw) of Edmond, Oklahoma; John C. Rainer (Taos Pueblo) of Albuquerque, New Mexico; and John Seneca (Seneca) of Washington, D.C. The advisory board was to focus on prioritizing and advising Nixon of the needs of Native Americans. Among Bergt's many local initiatives were advocacy for textile and animal husbandry training, housing proposals, and employment of Native Alaskans on the Trans-Alaska Pipeline System. She also worked on initiatives to promote care for children with disabilities, including provision of housing and rehabilitation services. In 1972, she began pushing the legislature to fund schools for children with special physical and mental needs, as there were no such facilities in the state. She advocated for establishing three regional schools to provide specialized education for children who had learning disabilities or were blind or deaf. She was called to a hearing on the matter and Governor William Egan appointed her to serve on the Hard-of-Hearing Task Force. He also selected her as a member of the Rural Affairs Commission.

In March 1973, Bergt was nominated by Egan to fill the vacated seat of Don Young in the Alaska Senate. Party members refused to endorse her candidacy, rejecting her because the appointment did not follow established protocols of coming from the prospective list supplied by the Fairbanks Republican District Committee. After the initial rejection, Egan resubmitted her name to fill the seat and the Senate rejected the appointment a second time. In May, Egan appointed Bergt to serve on the Reapportionment Board, which had been ordered by the Alaska Supreme Court to establish a permanent redistricting plan in accordance with the state constitution. Bergt was elected to serve in October 1973 on the Fairbanks City Council's Borough Assembly representing the North Star Borough. She did not seek re-election when her three-year term on the Borough Assembly expired.

Bergt was selected in 1973, as part of the Board of Regents for the Institute of American Indian Arts in Santa Fe, New Mexico. In 1974, she began working for the federal Indian Arts and Crafts Board on a study to determine the feasibility of establishing an arts institute for Alaska Natives. Also on the committee were Mary Jane Fate and author Thomas Richards, Jr. They traveled throughout the state to evaluate if cultural preservation should focus on traditional or contemporary arts, possible locations for a facility and student housing options, and whether curricula should include courses on marketing and technological training as well. With the assistance of Howard Rock of the Tundra Times, the committee was able to secure federal funds to establish the Institute of Alaska Native Arts.

In 1975, Bergt was appointed by Secretary of Health and Human Services Caspar Weinberger to serve on the 15-member National Health Advisory Committee. That year, she was also named by President Gerald Ford to serve on the United States Bicentennial Council to plan the 1976 celebrations in honor of the 200th anniversary of the American Revolution. She was selected in May 1976 for a two-year term as the commissioner of the Indian Arts and Crafts Board of the Department of the Interior. In December, she was appointed to the executive committee of Organization for the Management of Alaska's Resources.

In her later life, Bergt continued to work with the State Tourism Advisory Board, served on the boards of many organizations, and made numerous public appearances. She appeared on The Tonight Show Starring Johnny Carson three times, and on one memorable 1973 episode she presented Carson with an oosik, the reproductive organ of a male walrus, causing stunned silence from Carson and much amusement for the audience. She also took New York Senator James L. Buckley on a whaling expedition to Point Hope and made numerous appearances with activist Mary Jane Fate. The Bergts divorced in 1977, and the following year on September 23, she married a Hawaiian attorney, William Crockett. Their marriage lasted two years and marked a point after which she usually lived in Hawaii during the winter and in Alaska during the summer.

== Death and legacy ==
Laura Bergt Crockett died on March 14, 1984, in Honolulu from kidney failure. Her remains were cremated, and a service was held on March 25 at the Holy Family Cathedral in Anchorage. She is widely remembered for facilitating the discussions which resulted in the drafting and settlement of the Alaskan land claims. Richards wrote in 1973, that the Alaska Federation of Natives and its representatives struggled to gain consideration of their land claims for years. He credited the appointment of Bergt to the National Council on Indian Opportunity as the catalyst for overcoming differences between Native leaders and convincing the Nixon administration to support their claims in 1971. In 1984, she was posthumously bestowed the inaugural Frank Whaley Award of the World Eskimo Indian Olympics, which honors outstanding contributions to the organization. In 2015, she was inducted into the Alaska Women's Hall of Fame in recognition of her contributions to the state.

== See also ==
- Native American women in politics
