= Gerri Granger =

American actress and soul singer

Geraldine “Gerri” Granger is an American actress and soul singer.

Gerri Granger was a musical guest on the Johnny Carson show from 1962, in the 1969 series, 1973, 1974 and 1977 series. She also guested on The David Frost Show (1970), and ABC-TV's What's It All About World?.

Granger released one album Add A Little Love and had a minor hit with a cover of the Frankie Valli standard "Can't Take My Eyes Off You" 1967. She also recorded an answer song to Return to Sender - "Don't Want Your Letters", arranged and conducted by Bert Keyes.

Her song "I Go To Pieces (Everytime)" became massive on the U.K.'s Northern Soul Scene, despite only being released as a promo in the U.S.A. on the Bell Records label in 1971. Billboard listed it for release in February, however it was not officially released.

== Discography ==
- "Ain't it Funny" 1962
- C'Est Si Bon (It's So Good) / Show Stopper [Double L Records, 1965]
