= Carlfred Broderick =

American psychologist

- Born: Carlfred Bartholomew Broderick; April 7, 1932; Salt Lake City, Utah, U.S.
- Died: July 27, 1999 (aged 67); Cerritos, California, U.S.
- Occupations: Psychologist, sociologist, family therapist

Carlfred Bartholomew Broderick (April 7, 1932 – July 27, 1999) was an American psychologist, sociologist, and family therapist, a scholar of marriage and family relations at the University of Southern California, and an author of several books. He was born in Salt Lake City, Utah, in 1932, and he died of cancer in 1999 in Cerritos, California, at the age of 67.

== Personal ==
Although his given name was "Carlfred" (one name) he was known as "Carl" in many circles. He and his wife Kathleen had eight children (four sons and four daughters). He was an active member of the Church of Jesus Christ of Latter-day Saints and served in the capacity of bishop, stake president, and stake patriarch.

Broderick died on July 27, 1999, at his home in Cerritos, California.

== Education ==
Broderick attended Harvard University, earning his bachelor's degree in social relations, and graduating magna cum laude 1953. He completed his Ph.D. in child development and family relations at Cornell University in 1956 and later doing postdoctoral work at the University of Minnesota.

== Academia ==
Broderick was an associate professor of family development at the University of Georgia from 1956 to 1960 and a professor of family relationships at Pennsylvania State University from 1960 until 1971 at which time he joined the faculty at the University of Southern California. In addition to teaching and leading the marriage and family therapy program at USC, Broderick was himself a relationship counselor. A behaviorist, he helped partners in crisis by teaching them "working tools" for real-life situations. For three decades, he also assisted colleges and school districts in North and South America, Europe, and Australia in the development of family-life and sex-education programs. Broderick chaired the USC department of sociology from 1989 to 1991. From 1971 through his retirement in 1997, he was executive director of USC's Marriage and Family Therapy Training Program, and director of the Human Relations Center. Upon his retirement, which was due to ill health, USC named him professor emeritus.

== Public appearances ==
Broderick appeared as a guest on many radio and television talk shows, including ten times on The Tonight Show Starring Johnny Carson during the 1970s.

== Organizations ==
Broderick was active in the American Sociological Association, the International Sociological Association, the American Association of Marriage and Family Therapists, the Southern California Association of Marriage and Family Therapists (president in 1974–75), the American College of Sexology, the National Council on Family Relations (served as president), and the Association of Mormon Counselors and Psychotherapists (served as president in 1982–83). In 1989 the National Council on Family Relations honored him with its Distinguished Service Award for his "outstanding contributions to the field of family therapy."

== Writer ==
Broderick authored many books, papers and essays for different audiences. Some of his books are scholarly texts written for an audience of colleagues, others are for students, some are for individuals and couples who are trying to find happiness in their marital and family relationships. He served for 5 years as the editor of the Journal of Marriage and the Family (the publication of the National Council on Family Relations). A devout member of his religion, Carlfred wrote some books specifically for an audience of fellow church members which approach marital issues from a religious perspective.

Some of the periodicals which have featured his work include: Marriage and Family Living, The Journal of Social Issues, The Journal of Sex Research, The Journal of Marriage and the Family, The Ensign of The Church of Jesus Christ of Latter-day Saints, and Dialogue: A Journal of Mormon Thought.

A partial list of his books include:

- Understanding Family Process: Basics of Family Systems Theory
- One Flesh, One Heart: Putting Celestial Love into Your Temple Marriage
- The Therapeutic Triangle: A Sourcebook on Marital Therapy
- Dear Sister, Once Abused: A Story of Hope and Freedom from the Bondage of Childhood Sexual Abuse (written with Victoria Lynn)
- My Parents Married on a Dare: And Other Favorite Essays on Life
- Couples: How to Confront Problems and Maintain Loving Relationships
- Marriage and the Family
- The Uses of Adversity
