= Harrison Loesch =

American politician

Harrison Loesch (March 10, 1916 – November 11, 1997) was a Colorado attorney who became Assistant Secretary of Interior under Richard Nixon. He served in that position from 1969 to 1973. He was responsible for major changes in the Bureau of Indian Affairs, National Park Service, Bureau of Land Management, and the Division of Territories and Island Possessions, all of which reported directly to him.

== Biography ==
Loesch was born in Chicago on March 10, 1916. He was the son of Joseph B. Loesch and Constance Harrison Loesch and grandson of prominent Chicago attorney Frank J. Loesch. He was raised in Montrose, Colorado where his parents owned a ranch. He received a B.A. from Colorado College in 1936 and his LL.B. from Yale Law School in 1939. Loesch returned from Yale to practice law in Montrose in 1939, at the firm of Moynihan, Hughes & Knous. He married his wife Louise Mills in 1940. He volunteered and served in World War II with the United States Army Air Forces. He served in North Africa, then participated in the invasions of Sicily and Italy, and finally in the Normandy Landings, rising from private to the wartime temporary rank of colonel and permanent rank of major. After he returned to Montrose, he became a partner at the firm of Strang, Loesch & Kreidler. He then founded his own firm, Loesch, Kreidler & Durham. In 1961 Loesch was elected president of the Colorado Bar Association. His practice was broadly general, but with considerable specialization in resource matters. His clients included numerous mining, electric, and other resource-oriented companies, as well as farmers, ranchers and other individuals and companies.

In March 1969, Loesch was nominated by Richard Nixon for the position of Assistant Secretary of Interior for Public Land Management and confirmed by the Senate. In spite of the title, Loesch's departments included the Bureau of Indian Affairs and the Division of Territories and Island Possessions, as well as the Bureau of Land Management and the National Park Service. He served under Secretary of the Interior Wally Hickel until November 1970, then under Rogers Morton.

During his tenure as Assistant Secretary, Loesch was involved in several controversies concerning Native Americans. One of the most notable was the occupation of Interior Department offices in Washington D.C. in 1972 by members of the American Indian Movement (AIM), led by Dennis Banks and Russell Means. Loesch was also intimately involved in negotiating the Alaska Native Claims Settlement Act, which was signed in December 1971, and in the settlement of disputes among the Navaho, Zuni and Hopi tribes and the states of Arizona and New Mexico throughout his tenure.

Loesch's responsibility for the Division of Territories and Island Possessions occasioned several visits to the U.S. Trust Territory of the Pacific Islands, generally referred to as "Micronesia". During his tenure, Loesch negotiated status agreements for the various territories, which today include Guam, the Northern Mariana Islands, and the Federated States of Micronesia. At the request of island leaders, Loesch drew on his legal background to draft some of the founding documents for these new entities.

In early December 1972, Loesch received a telephone call from John Ehrlichman, Assistant to the President, requesting that he immediately release $50,000 from his discretionary fund for use by the White House. Similar requests went out to Assistant Secretaries in other departments. Correctly suspecting that this request was related to the unfolding Watergate scandal, Loesch insisted on a written memo requesting the money. On December 8, Loesch's "resignation" was accepted. However, because he was deeply involved in critical negotiations concerning Indian water rights in Arizona, the Nixon White House found it necessary to "unfire" Loesch for several weeks, before "refiring" him on January 20, 1973.

Upon leaving the Interior Department, Loesch became Minority Counsel for the Senate Committee on Interior and Insular Affairs. In that capacity, he advised Senators and drafted legislation on issues related to water resources, public land management, settlement of Indian claims and territories and possessions. In 1976, he accepted the position of executive vice president for public affairs with Peabody Coal Company. He retired from that position in 1981 and returned to Montrose, where he was active in local banking and community affairs. He died aged 81, on November 11, 1997 in Minneapolis, Minnesota.
