= Myron Cohen =

American comedian

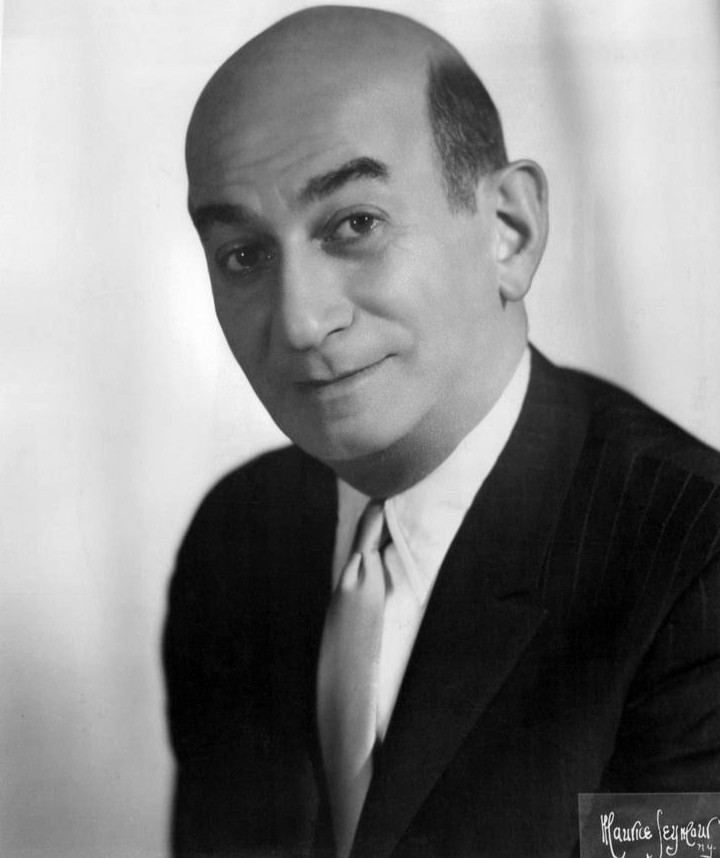
- Cohen in 1962
- Born: July 1, 1902; Grodno, Russia
- Died: March 10, 1986 (aged 83); Nyack, New York, USA
- Resting place: Cedar Park Cemetery, Emerson, New Jersey
- Occupations: Comedian, raconteur
- Years active: 1950s – 1970s
- Spouse: Miriam Hyman (m. 1925; died 1981)

Myron Cohen (July 1, 1902 – March 10, 1986) was an American comedian and raconteur.

A son of Barnett and Rebecca (Feinstein) Cohen, Myron Aaron Cohen was born in Grodno, Russia (now Hrodna, Belarus), and came to America as a little boy. The oldest of three brothers, he grew up in Manhattan, and later lived in the Bronx with his wife Miriam (née Hyman), whom he married in 1925. She died in 1981.

Cohen began as a salesman in the New York City garment industry. When calling on customers, before showing his samples, he would tell a joke to put everyone at ease and establish a friendly mood. Cohen’s jokes were often more popular than his garment samples, and his customers urged him to become a professional comedian.

He was a nightclub entertainer in the 1950s and 1960s, recording several live record albums and also frequently appearing on TV variety programs such as The Ed Sullivan Show. His live album Everybody Gotta Be Someplace reached No. 102 in the US. During the 1950s, when there were numerous nightclub showroom venues throughout the nation, he was one of the top headliners in the same league as Sophie Tucker, Ted Lewis, Ray Vasquez, Jimmy Durante, and Joe E. Lewis, among others. Compared with many star performers, he was not aloof, and was very affable and approachable in public. Although he spoke perfect, cultured English, he was a master at capturing the ethnic accents of the Jewish citizens of New York City.

Cohen suffered a heart attack at age 83 and died at Nyack Hospital, where he had been taken from his home in New City, New York. Cohen is interred at Cedar Park Cemetery, in Emerson, New Jersey.

He is played by Randall Newsome in Regina King's One Night in Miami....

== Trivia ==
In the 1973 Woody Allen movie Sleeper, Cohen, along with fellow comedian Jackie Mason, had uncredited voice cameos as the Jewish "Ginsberg and Cohen" robot tailors since 2073.

== Bibliography ==
- 1958: Laughing Out Loud. (Citadel Press).
- 1960: More Laughing Out Loud. (Citadel Press).
- 1960: Myron Cohen’s Big Joke Book. (Citadel Press).
- 1978: The Myron Cohen Joke Book: Laughing Out Loud and More Laughing Out Loud. (Gramercy Books)
