= Stephanie Edwards (television personality) =

Actress and television personality

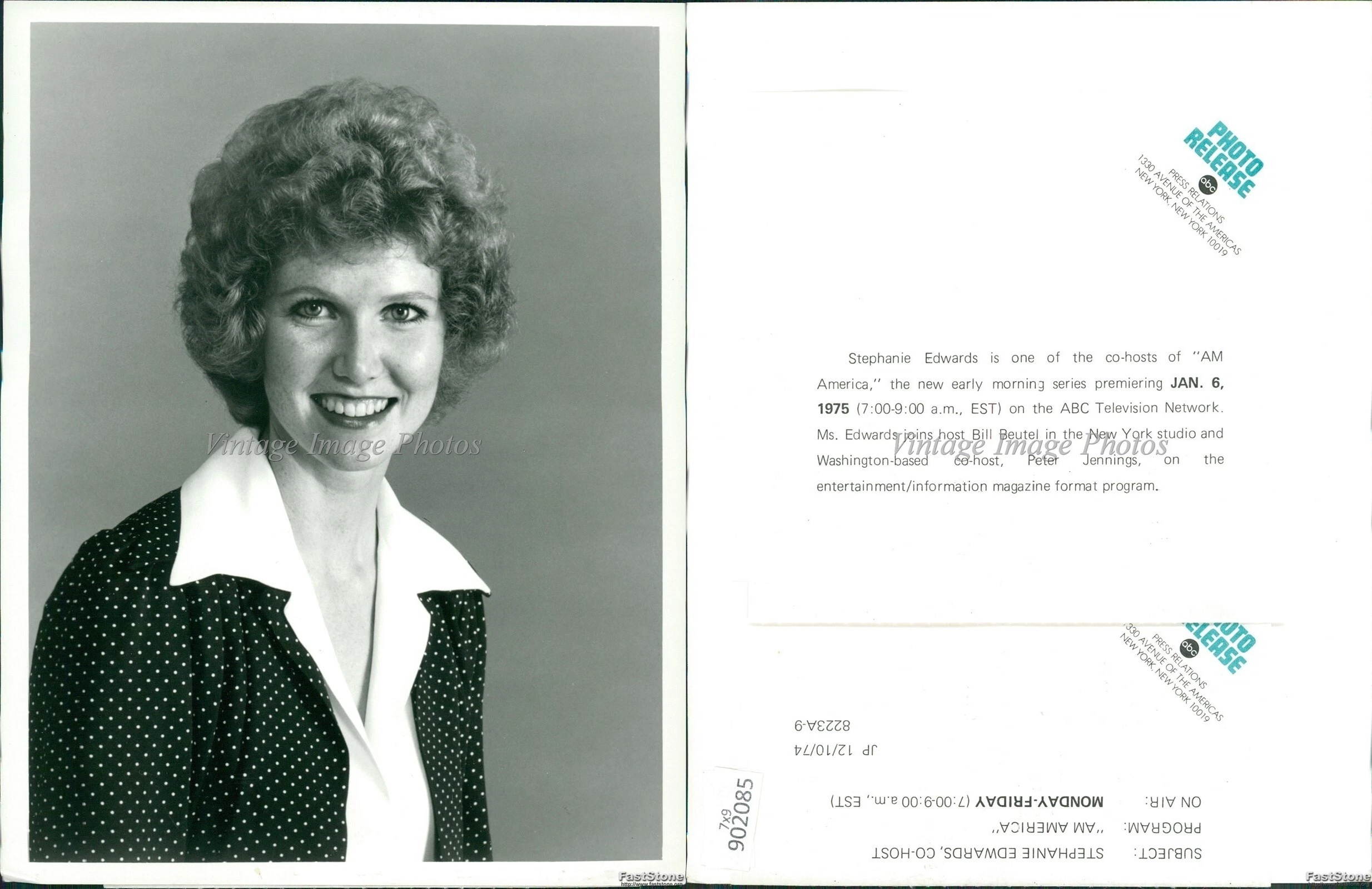
- Edwards in 1974
- Occupations: Television personality, actress

Stephanie Edwards is an American television personality and actress.

== Career ==
Edwards began her career as an actress, and became widely known as an on-air personality in the 1970s. She co-hosted ABC-TV's AM America, the forerunner to Good Morning America, jointly with Bill Beutel, continuing with GMA as a frequent substitute for Joan Lunden. Previously, she had hosted a similar West Coast news and talk program in Southern California, AM Los Angeles along with Ralph Story.

Edwards was nominated in 1979 for a Daytime Emmy Award as Outstanding Host or Hostess in a Talk, Service or Variety Series, for her show Everyday.

=== Tournament of Roses parade ===
From 1978 to 2005, Edwards served in the main broadcast booth with former game show host Bob Eubanks as co-host of the Tournament of Roses Parade on Los Angeles television station KTLA Channel 5, then broadcast widely throughout the United States and Canada as a cable and satellite superstation. After 28 continuous years in the position, Edwards was then replaced as Eubanks' main booth co-host by KTLA morning news co-anchor Michaela Pereira, with Edwards herself being reassigned as an on-the-street reporter, sometimes having to stand in the rain while giving periodic live updates. Although all three were equally billed as co-hosts, the move created a storm of controversy and was seen as insensitive by many of Edwards' fans, as well as by local TV critics. Finally, in 2009, Edwards rejoined Eubanks as the main co-host of KTLA's Tournament of Roses Parade coverage, remaining continuously in the position again until 2016, following a September 25, 2015 announcement by Eubanks that the 2016 parade would be their last.

Edwards was also the longtime commercial spokesperson for the California-based supermarket chain Lucky Stores from the mid-1980s until they merged with Albertsons (1998).

== Filmography ==
Film
Year	Film	Role	Notes
1973	Maurie	Carol	Alternative title: Big Mo
1980	The Formula	Reporter	
Television
Year	Title	Role	Notes
1971	Love, American Style		1 episode
1972	Temperatures Rising	Reporter	1 episode
1973	Marcus Welby, M.D.	Judith Haines	1 episode
1973	The Christmas Visit	Alice Johnson	Television movie
1973	Match Game 73	Herself	5 episodes
1973–1974	The Girl with Something Extra	Angela	10 episodes
1977	Police Story	Faye Ludwig	1 episode
1984	The Hoboken Chicken Emergency	Newscaster	Television movie
1985	Lots of Luck		Television movie
1985	The Fall Guy	Self	1 episode

== Award nominations ==
Year	Award	Result	Category	Series
1979	Daytime Emmy Award	Nominated	Outstanding Host or Hostess in a Talk, Service or Variety Series	Everyday
