= Shecky Greene =

American comedian (1926–2023)

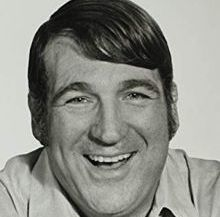
- Greene in The Love Machine (1971)
- Born: Fred Sheldon Greenfield; April 8, 1926; Chicago, Illinois, U.S.
- Died: December 31, 2023 (aged 97); Las Vegas, Nevada, U.S.
- Education: Sullivan High School, Wilbur Wright College
- Occupations: Comedian, actor
- Years active: 1954–2003; 2009–2023
- Spouses: Nalani Kele (m. 1972; div. 1982) Marie Musso (m. 1985)

Shecky Greene (born Fred Sheldon Greenfield; April 8, 1926 – December 31, 2023) was an American comedian and actor. He was known for his nightclub performances in Las Vegas, Nevada, where he became a headliner in the 1950s and 1960s. He appeared in several films, including Tony Rome; History of the World, Part I; and Splash. In television, he guest-starred on such television shows as Love, American Style and Combat!, and later Laverne & Shirley and Mad About You.

== Early life and education ==
Fred Sheldon Greenfield was born on April 8, 1926, to Jewish parents, Carl and Bessie Greenfield, and raised on the North Side of Chicago. In his youth, Greene enjoyed performing as a singer and in a drama club he formed while attending Sullivan High School. He emulated his older brother, who liked to speak in accents.

During World War II, Greene served in the U.S. Navy for three years and was discharged in 1944. He was briefly, but more than once, enrolled at Wright Junior College.

== Career ==
Greene had planned to become a gym teacher. But after regularly performing stand-up in Chicago at mob-run nightclubs and various venues in the upper Midwest, he instead started his comedy career at the Prevue Lounge in New Orleans, Louisiana, where he worked for six years. From there, he went on to showrooms in Miami, Chicago, and Reno/Lake Tahoe before an agent persuaded him to move to Las Vegas and open in 1954 for Dorothy Shay, "the Park Avenue Hillbillie", at the Last Frontier. His act was held over for 18 weeks, a first for that venue. He began performing at the Tropicana Hotel in 1957, remaining there for five years as one of their headliners.

He invented a hysterical, free-form approach to comedy that the confines of a five minute television spot could not handle.

Greene played Carnegie Hall and appeared on TV variety show The Ed Sullivan Show, which he said he hated because "They'd rush you on and off". He played Pvt. Braddock for a year on Combat! and guested on The Joey Bishop Show, The Love Boat, and played Lou Carnesco in two episodes of The Fall Guy. He appeared in "Members Only", a fourth-season, 1985 episode of the action TV show The A-Team. Greene was widely respected by his peers, including Johnny Carson who was a longtime fan. Greene made 40 appearances on The Tonight Show on which he also served as a guest host. He appeared on The Merv Griffin Show and also served as a guest host there upon occasion. He noted that he gave Arnold Schwarzenegger and Luciano Pavarotti their first national television exposure. Furthermore, he also appeared on Match Game and Tattletales (with his first wife Nalani Kele) in the 1970s. In December 1977, he appeared in The Love Boat S1 E11 vignette "Divorce Me, Please" as Paul Baynes, who discovers newfound appreciation for his wife Audrey, played by Florence Henderson.

When the MGM Grand Hotel opened in 1975 with Dean Martin as headliner, the second headline act was Greene whose salary at one point climbed to $150,000 a week; he quipped that $125,000 went to "my bookmaker".

Greene claimed Jay Leno once told him that his all-time favorite joke was one Greene recounted about Frank Sinatra (with whom Greene had a contentious relationship) "saving his life". As quoted by John Lahr, Greene said, "Frank Sinatra once saved my life. I was jumped by a bunch of guys in the parking lot and they were hitting me and beating me with blackjacks when Frank walked over and said, 'That's enough, boys.'"

Beginning in 2003 and lasting for six years, Greene suffered from panic attacks and stage fright that rendered him unable to perform. In 2009, in Las Vegas, Greene returned to performing.

Greene owned several nightclubs over the years and in different cities, including New Orleans.

== Personal life and death ==
Offstage, Greene's main passion was Thoroughbred racing. A horse named Shecky Greene (1970–1984) was the 1973 American Champion Sprint Horse and the front-runner for nearly seven furlongs in the 1973 Kentucky Derby until Secretariat (1970–1989) ran off with the race. Arlington Park in Arlington Heights, Illinois, outside Chicago, held a Shecky Greene Handicap race until it closed.

Greene was married twice. He was married to Nalani Kele from 1972 to 1982. She had a successful nightclub act, the Nalani Kele Polynesian Revue, from the 1960s to the early 1970s. Beginning in 1985, he was married to Marie Musso, daughter of Vido Musso, a Las Vegas musician who played saxophone with Benny Goodman.

Greene experienced career obstacles due to depression, bipolar disorder, stage fright, gambling, panic attacks, drug abuse and alcoholism. He integrated his bipolar disorder into his public persona, telling an interviewer in 2010 that "I'm more than bipolar. I'm South Polar, North Polar. I'm every kind of polar there is. I even lived with a polar bear for about a year."

Greene led "humanitarian efforts" to create St. Jude's Ranch, a shelter for indigent and neglected children in Boulder City, Nevada.

Greene died at home in Las Vegas on December 31, 2023, at age 97.

== Awards ==
- Las Vegas Entertainment Award — Best Lounge Entertainer
- Jimmy Durante Award — Best Comedian
- Las Vegas Academy of Variety and Cabaret Artists — Male Comedy Star

== Select filmography ==
Year	Title	Role	Notes
1967	Tony Rome	Catleg	
1971	The Love Machine	Christie Lane	
1976	Won Ton Ton, the Dog Who Saved Hollywood	Tourist	
1981	History of the World, Part I	Marcus Vindictus	
1984	Splash	Mr. Buyrite	
1984	Lovelines	Master of Ceremonies	
2000	The Last Producer	Poker Player	
2013	When Jews Were Funny	Himself	Documentary
