= Euell Gibbons =

American writer, outdoorsman, and health food advocate

- Gibbons circa 1960
- Born: Euell Theophilus Gibbons; September 8, 1911; Clarksville, Texas, U.S.
- Died: December 29, 1975 (aged 64); Sunbury, Pennsylvania, U.S.
- Other name: Ewell Gibbons
- Spouse(s): Anna Swanson; Freda Fryer

Euell Theophilus Gibbons (September 8, 1911 – December 29, 1975) was an outdoorsman and early health food advocate who promoted eating wild foods during the 1960s.

== Early career ==
Gibbons was born in Clarksville, Texas, on September 8, 1911. His father drifted from job to job, usually taking his wife and four children with him. When he was 11, his family moved to Estancia Valley, New Mexico, where they became homesteaders.

During one difficult interval of homesteading, Gibbons began foraging for local plants and berries to supplement his family's diet. After leaving home at 15, he drifted throughout the Southwest, finding work as a dairyman, carpenter, trapper, gold panner, and cowboy. During the early years of the Dust Bowl, Gibbons lived in California, where he became a "bindle stiff". In sympathy with labor causes, he began writing Communist Party leaflets. From 1934 to 1936, he settled in Seattle, where he served in the Army. During his time in the military, he worked as a carpenter, surveyor, and boatbuilder. In 1936, He married his first wife, Anna Swanson. They had two children together.

During the late 1930s, Gibbons was still giving "more time to his political activity than to his work, and more time to wild food than to politics". However, after the Soviet Union invaded Poland in 1939, he renounced Communism and spent most of World War II in Hawaii, building and repairing boats for the Navy. His first marriage, Gibbons recalled, became a "casualty of the war." Swanson divorced Gibbons in 1946, and he became a beachcomber on the Hawaiian Islands.

After entering the University of Hawaii in 1947 at the age of 36, Gibbons majored in anthropology and won the university's creative writing prize. In 1948, he married Freda Fryer, a teacher, and both decided to join the Society of Friends, stating "I became a Quaker because it was the only group I could join without pretending to have beliefs that I didn't have or concealing beliefs that I did have".

They relocated to the mainland in 1953, where, after a failed attempt to found a cooperative agricultural community in Indiana, Gibbons became a staff member at Pendle Hill Quaker Study Center near Philadelphia. In 1960, with his wife's support, he followed through on his earlier aspirations and turned to writing.

== Literary career and celebrity ==
In the early 1960s, Gibbons began writing a novel about a schoolteacher who creates opulent meals from foraged ingredients to impress café society. At the request of a literary agent, Gibbons reworked his novel draft into a straightforward book on wild food. Capitalizing on the growing return-to-nature movement in 1962, his first book, Stalking the Wild Asparagus, sold over half a million copies and has remained continuously in print since its publication. Gibbons published the cookbooks Stalking the Blue-Eyed Scallop in 1964 and Stalking the Healthful Herbs in 1966. His writings were also printed in several magazines. He was featured in an article in the 23 September 1966 issue of LIFE.

He wrote two pieces for National Geographic. His first National Geographic article, in the July 1972 issue, described his two-week stay on an uninhabited island off the coast of Maine. Gibbons, his wife, and a few family friends relied solely on local resources for sustenance. His second National Geographic article, in the August 1973 issue, featured Gibbons, along with his granddaughter Colleen, grandson Mike, and daughter-in-law Patricia, "stalking" wild foods in four western states.

In the early 1970s, Gibbons was featured in television commercials for Post Grape-Nuts cereal. He asked viewers, "Ever eat a pine tree? Many parts are edible." and remarked that the taste reminded him "of wild hickory nuts". Gibbons made guest appearances on The Tonight Show and The Sonny & Cher Comedy Hour. When presented with a wooden plaque by Sonny and Cher, Gibbons took a bite out of it. Gibbons also appeared on an episode of The Dean Martin Celebrity Roast. He received an honorary degree from Susquehanna University.

He was satirized by John Byner on an episode of the Carol Burnett Show. Johnny Carson joked that "Mary Tyler Moore needs another Emmy like Euell Gibbons needs prunes". In a 1974 skit on the children's television program The Electric Company, cast member Skip Hinnant (as Early Gibbons) was a proponent of eating items starting with the prefix "ST-," including a tree stump, a staircase (with a "first step," presumably made of wood), and sticks and stones.

== Death ==
Gibbons died on December 29, 1975, aged 64, at Sunbury Community Hospital in Sunbury, Pennsylvania of a ruptured aortic aneurysm.

== Legacy ==
In Larry Groce's song "Junk Food Junkie", Groce claims to be "a friend of old Euell Gibbons" as he extols his healthy lifestyle.

Gibbons was sometimes a character used in questions for the contestants of Match Game in the mid-1970s (for instance, episode 554, in 1975).

Gibbons is referenced in Season 2, Episode 15 of Gilmore Girls. Lorelai Gilmore asks Jess Mariano, "So, are you a healthy eater like Luke?" To which Jess replies, "No... no one's a healthy eater like Luke; Euell Gibbons wasn't a healthy eater like Luke!"

Gibbons is considered a saint by the God's Gardeners, a fictional religious sect that is the focus of Margaret Atwood's 2009 novel The Year of the Flood.

Often mistaken for a survivalist, Gibbons was an advocate for nutritious but neglected plants, which he typically prepared in the kitchen with abundant use of spices, butter and garnishes. Several of his books discuss what he called "wild parties"—dinner parties where guests were served dishes prepared from plants gathered in the wild. His favorite recommendations included lamb's quarters, rose hips, young dandelion shoots, stinging nettle and cattails. He often pointed out that gardeners threw away the tastier, more healthful crop when they removed such "weeds" as purslane and amaranth from among their spinach plants.

== Bibliography ==
- Stalking the Wild Asparagus (1962)
- Stalking the Blue-Eyed Scallop (1964)
- Stalking the Healthful Herbs (1966)
- Stalking the Good Life (1966)
- Beachcomber's Handbook (1967)
- A Wild Way to Eat (1967) for the Hurricane Island Outward Bound School
- Stalking the Faraway Places (1973)
- Feast on a Diabetic Diet (1973)
- Euell Gibbons' Handbook of Edible Wild Plants (1979)
