= ABC Afterschool Special =

American anthology television series (1972–1997)

- Genre: Anthology
- Country of origin: United States
- No. of seasons: 25
- No. of episodes: 154

Production
- Camera setup: Single-camera
- Running time: 60 minutes

Original release
- Network: ABC
- Release: October 4, 1972 – January 23, 1997

ABC Afterschool Special is an American anthology television series that aired on ABC from October 4, 1972, to January 23, 1997, usually in the late afternoon on weekdays. Most episodes were dramatically presented situations, often controversial, of interest to children and teenagers. Several episodes were either in animated form or presented as documentaries. Topics included illiteracy, substance abuse and teenage pregnancy. The series won 51 Daytime Emmy Awards and four Peabody Awards during its 25-year run.

In 2004 and 2005, BCI Eclipse and Sunset Home Visual Entertainment issued six DVD collections of episodes from the series that had been produced by Martin Tahse, each collection containing four episodes. A boxed set, in the shape of a school bus, was also released containing all of the DVD releases, with a detailed information booklet of all the specials on the set and including an extra DVD of two specials that had previously not been released on DVD.

== Episodes ==
| Season | Episodes | Originally released | |
| Season | Episodes | First released | Last released |
|---|---|---|---|
| 1 | 6 | October 4, 1972 | April 4, 1973 |
| 2 | 7 | October 3, 1973 | June 5, 1974 |
| 3 | 7 | October 2, 1974 | April 23, 1975 |
| 4 | 7 | October 8, 1975 | May 19, 1976 |
| 5 | 6 | October 6, 1976 | April 6, 1977 |
| 6 | 7 | October 12, 1977 | May 5, 1978 |
| 7 | 7 | September 27, 1978 | May 9, 1979 |
| 8 | 7 | September 26, 1979 | March 19, 1980 |
| 9 | 7 | September 24, 1980 | March 18, 1981 |
| 10 | 7 | September 23, 1981 | April 7, 1982 |
| 11 | 8 | September 22, 1982 | March 30, 1983 |
| 12 | 7 | September 21, 1983 | April 18, 1984 |
| 13 | 7 | September 19, 1984 | May 21, 1985 |
| 14 | 7 | September 11, 1985 | March 19, 1986 |
| 15 | 8 | September 19, 1986 | June 3, 1987 |
| 16 | 6 | September 9, 1987 | March 16, 1988 |
| 17 | 7 | September 15, 1988 | April 20, 1989 |
| 18 | 6 | September 14, 1989 | April 19, 1990 |
| 19 | 5 | September 13, 1990 | March 21, 1991 |
| 20 | 4 | September 18, 1991 | April 16, 1992 |
| 21 | 4 | October 1, 1992 | April 15, 1993 |
| 22 | 4 | September 16, 1993 | June 2, 1994 |
| 23 | 5 | September 15, 1994 | May 25, 1995 |
| 24 | 6 | September 21, 1995 | June 11, 1996 |
| 25 | 4 | September 12, 1996 | January 23, 1997 |

=== Season 1 (1972–73) ===
| No. overall | No. in season | Title | Based on | Original release date |
|---|---|---|---|---|
| 1 | 1 | "Last of the Curlews" | Last of the Curlews by Fred Bosworth | October 4, 1972 |
Animated special about a father and son who go hunting, and debate whether or not to kill an Eskimo curlew, which may become (and may now be) extinct.
| 2 | 2 | "Follow the North Star" | Original teleplay by Alvin Boretz | November 1, 1972 |
A young boy helps his friend escape slavery through the Underground Railroad.
| 3 | 3 | "Santiago's Ark" | Original teleplay by Albert Waller | December 6, 1972 |
An imaginative, determined 14-year-old Puerto Rican boy builds a boat in which to sail around Central Park. Co-starring Bill Duke and René Enríquez. Followed in 1975 by the sequel Santiago's America.
| 4 | 4 | "William: The Life, Works, and Times of William Shakespeare" | Original teleplay by James Ivory, Hildy Parks and Ruth Prawer Jhabvala | January 3, 1973 |
Special introducing William Shakespeare to young people through sketches, readings and music.
| 5 | 5 | "The Incredible, Indelible, Magical Physical, Mystery Trip" | Original teleplay by Guy Fraumeni and Larry Spiegel | February 7, 1973 |
Animated special about two youngsters who are miniaturized and travel through their uncle's body to understand more about his health. Features the first appearance of Timer, a character later featured in ABC's Time for Timer shorts.
| 6 | 6 | "Alexander" | Original teleplay by Jan Hartman and Larry Spiegel | April 4, 1973 |
The story of a retired clown and his undying love for children. Starring Red Buttons, Robbie Rist and Jodie Foster.

=== Season 2 (1973–74) ===
| No. overall | No. in season | Title | Based on | Original release date |
|---|---|---|---|---|
| 7 | 1 | "Rookie of the Year" | Not Bad For a Girl by Isabella Taves | October 3, 1973 |
Eleven-year-old Sharon Lee (Jodie Foster) encounters opposition when she joins her brother's Little League baseball team, which happens to be all male. (1972 was when girls were first allowed on Little League teams.) Co-starring Steve Gustafson.
| 8 | 2 | "My Dad Lives in a Downtown Hotel" | My Dad Lives in a Downtown Hotel by Peggy Mann Houlton | November 28, 1973 |
Joseph Grant, Jr. (Ike Eisenmann) is shocked when his parents announce their decision to separate. Beau Bridges portrays Joe, Sr.
| 9 | 3 | "Psst! Hammerman's After You!" | The 18th Emergency by Betsy Byars | January 16, 1974 |
A sixth-grader has a run-in with the class bully, who then wants to meet with him after school. Starring Lance Kerwin and Willie Aames.
| 10 | 4 | "Cyrano" | Cyrano de Bergerac by Edmond Rostand | March 6, 1974 |
Long-nosed Cyrano de Bergerac (voice of José Ferrer, reprising his Oscar-winning title role) helps an army officer woo Roxanne (voice of Joan Van Ark), the woman Cyrano himself loves, in this Hanna-Barbera Productions-animated episode.
| 11 | 5 | "The Runaways" | Original teleplay by Clyde Ware | March 27, 1974 |
Live-action; a small-town teenage girl teams up with a younger but wiser boy for survival. Co-starring Moosie Drier.
| 12 | 6 | "The Magical Mystery Trip Through Little Red's Head" | Original teleplay by Larry Spiegel | May 15, 1974 |
Animated musical. Timer (Lennie Weinrib) shrinks down two youngsters, Larry (Ike Eisenmann) and Carol (Diane Murphy) and shows them around their teenage sister Little Red's (Sarah Kennedy) head, to discover how the mind works.
| 13 | 7 | "The Crazy Comedy Concert" | Original teleplay by Duane Poole | June 5, 1974 |
Live action/animation special geared to educate young people about classical music. Starring Tim Conway and Ruth Buzzi.

=== Season 3 (1974–75) ===
| No. overall | No. in season | Title | Based on | Original release date |
|---|---|---|---|---|
| 14 | 1 | "Sara's Summer of the Swans" | Summer of the Swans by Betsy Byars | October 2, 1974 |
Teenage Sara (Heather Totten) must confront the problems regarding her mentally challenged brother. Co-starring Chris Knight and Eve Plumb. (Note: These episodes, directed by Martin Tahse, were included in the School Bus DVD set released in 2005.)
| 15 | 2 | "The Bridge of Adam Rush" | Original teleplay by Lee Kalcheim | October 23, 1974 |
Twelve-year-old Adam (Lance Kerwin) adjusts to a new way of life when his mother remarries and moves their whole family to the country.
| 16 | 3 | "Winning and Losing: Diary of a Campaign" | Documentary | November 6, 1974 |
The 1974 Senate race is seen through the eyes of two teenage girls, each a campaign volunteer for George McGovern (Democrat) and Leo K. Thorsness (Republican).
| 17 | 4 | "The Toothpaste Millionaire" | The Toothpaste Millionaire by Jean Merrill | November 27, 1974 |
Aspiring 12-year-old entrepreneur Rufus (Tierre Turner) decides to create and sell his own brand of toothpaste. Co-starring Wright King.
| 18 | 5 | "The Skating Rink" | The Skating Rink by Mildred Lee | February 5, 1975 |
A teenager with a stuttering problem overcomes his shyness to become a championship figure skater. Co-starring Cindy Eilbacher and Rance Howard.
| 19 | 6 | "Santiago's America" | Original teleplay by Albert Waller | February 19, 1975 |
A Puerto Rican boy is invited to a prestigious conference in Los Angeles. With no money, he re-builds a broken taxi to get there. Bill Duke and René Enríquez reprise their roles.
| 20 | 7 | "The Secret Life of T.K. Dearing" | The Secret Life of T.K. Dearing by Jean Robinson | April 23, 1975 |
12-year-old T.K. (Jodie Foster) invites her grandfather to join a "secret" club. Co-starring Tierre Turner.

=== Season 4 (1975–76) ===
| No. overall | No. in season | Title | Based on | Original release date |
|---|---|---|---|---|
| 21 | 1 | "It Must Be Love ('Cause I Feel So Dumb!)" | Original teleplay by Arthur Barron | October 8, 1975 |
Eric (Alfred Lutter), 13-year-old boy, has a crush on Lisa (Vicky Dawson), a cheerleader at his school, and dreams up creative ways to try to impress her.
| 22 | 2 | "Fawn Story" | Original teleplay by Tony Kayden | October 22, 1975 |
Siblings Jenna, Toby, and Louisa McPhail (Kristy McNichol, Poindexter Yothers, and Karen Obediear) discover a wounded deer and nurse it back to health. Co-starring Gordon Jump; Yothers is the brother of Corey and Tina.
| 23 | 3 | "The Shaman's Last Raid" | The Shaman's Last Raid by Betty Lou Baker | November 19, 1975 |
Despite his failing health, a Native American medicine man is determined to teach his great-grandchildren the traditions of the Apache nation. Starring Dehl Berti.
| 24 | 4 | "The Amazing Cosmic Awareness of Duffy Moon" | The Strange, but Wonderful, Cosmic Awareness of Duffy Moon by Jean Robinson | February 4, 1976 |
Tired of ridicule, undersized sixth-grader Duffy (Ike Eisenmann) buys a mysterious book which enables him to "Think Big"—literally. Co-starring Lance Kerwin, Jim Backus, and Jerry Van Dyke.
| 25 | 5 | "Me & Dad's New Wife" | A Smart Kid Like You by Stella Pevsner | February 18, 1976 |
Twelve-year-old Nina Beckwith (Kristy McNichol) deals with her new stepmother. Co-starring Lance Kerwin, Melendy Britt, Leif Garrett, and Jimmy McNichol.
| 26 | 6 | "Blind Sunday" | Original teleplay by Arthur Barron and Fred Pressburger | April 21, 1976 |
Shy teenager Jeff (Leigh McCloskey) meets his first girlfriend Eileen ("Lee", Jewel Blanch), at a swimming pool. She is friendly, good-humored, pretty, a skilled diver—and blind since birth. To try to understand Lee's world better, Jeff spends an entire day blindfolded. Co-starring Robert Ridgely (as Jeff's dad), Cindy Eilbacher, and Corbin Bernsen.
| 27 | 7 | "Dear Lovey Hart: I Am Desperate" | Dear Lovey Hart: I Am Desperate by Ellen Conford | May 19, 1976 |
Teenage Carrie Wasserman (Susan Lawrence) takes up writing an advice column for her school newspaper. Co-starring Al Eisenmann as Carrie's brother Jeff.

=== Season 5 (1976–77) ===
| No. overall | No. in season | Title | Based on | Original release date |
|---|---|---|---|---|
| 28 | 1 | "Francesca, Baby" | Francesca, Baby by Joan Oppenheimer | October 6, 1976 |
Teenager Francesca James (Carol Jones) deals with her alcoholic mother Lillian (Melendy Britt) by joining the support group Alateen. Co-starring Jody Britt (Britt's real-life daughter).
| 29 | 2 | "P.J. and the President's Son" | The Prince and the Pauper by Mark Twain | November 10, 1976 |
A delivery boy and the President's son (Lance Kerwin in a dual role) meet, see that they are exact doubles, and decide to swap identities for mutual amusement. Co-starring Harry Kerwin and Rosalind Chao.
| 30 | 3 | "Mighty Moose and the Quarterback Kid" | Original teleplay by Gerald Gardner, Kay Cousins Johnson and Jeff Millar | December 1, 1976 |
A football coach (Dave Madden) tries to mediate a conflict between his star quarterback (Brandon Cruz) and the boy's father (Joseph Mascolo). Co-starring Alex Karras.
| 31 | 4 | "My Mom's Having a Baby" | Original teleplay by Susan Fichter Kennedy and Elaine Evans Rushnell | February 16, 1977 |
A curious 10-year-old big-brother-to-be seeks answers as to where babies come from.
| 32 | 5 | "The Horrible Honchos" | The Seventeenth-Street Gang by Emily Cheney Neville | March 9, 1977 |
The neighborhood youth gang makes a pact to bully and torment the new kid on their 17th Street turf. Starring Kim Richards, Christian Juttner, Tara Talboy, Billy Jayne and Christopher Maleki.
| 33 | 6 | "Very Good Friends" | Beat the Turtle Drum by Constance C. Greene | April 6, 1977 |
Thirteen-year-old Kate (Melissa Sue Anderson) deals with the sudden death of her younger sister, Joss (Katy Kurtzman).

=== Season 6 (1977–78) ===
| No. overall | No. in season | Title | Based on | Original release date |
|---|---|---|---|---|
| 34 | 1 | "Hewitt's Just Different" | Original teleplay by Jan Hartman | October 12, 1977 |
A mentally challenged 16-year-old attempts to make friends with his neighborhood peers. Starring Moosie Drier, Russell Johnson, and Tom Gulager.
| 35 | 2 | "The Pinballs" | The Pinballs by Betsy Byars | October 26, 1977 |
Three orphans (portrayed by Kristy McNichol, Johnny Doran and Sparky Marcus) from different backgrounds find themselves living with the same foster parents. Note: Walt Disney Educational Production released a classroom edition of this episode.
| 36 | 3 | "Michel's Mixed-Up Musical Bird" | Michel's Mixed-Up Musical Bird by Michael Legrand and George A. Mendoza | February 1, 1978 |
Live-action/animation special featuring Michel Legrand in a true story about the bird that inspired him while studying at the Paris Conservatory of Music.
| 37 | 4 | "It Isn't Easy Being a Teenage Millionaire" | Original teleplay by Jim Inman | March 1, 1978 |
When 14-year-old Melissa Harrington (Victoria Paige Meyerink) wins the lottery, she thinks she'll never need to worry about money—or anything else—again. Unfortunately, fate has other plans.
| 38 | 5 | "The Rag Tag Champs" | Jake by Alfred Slote | March 22, 1978 |
A 14-year-old baseball player and his manager-uncle are at odds over their different interpretations of the philosophy "Winning isn't everything, it's the only thing". Starring Larry B. Scott.
| 39 | 6 | "Mom and Dad Can't Hear Me" | Original teleplay by Irma Reichert and Daryl Warner | April 5, 1978 |
Teenage Charlie Meredith (Rosanna Arquette) is used to acting as the ears of her deaf parents, but she's ashamed when she introduces her peers to them; because of their reactions, the elder Merediths come off as being out-of-touch.
| 40 | 7 | "It's a Mile from Here to Glory" | It's a Mile from Here to Glory by Robert C. Lee | May 5, 1978 |
After Early McLaren (Steve Shaw), a high school track star is disabled in a near-fatal accident, he must learn to depend on others for day-to-day living. Anthony Kiedis has a role as Jimmy.

=== Season 7 (1978–79) ===
| No. overall | No. in season | Title | Based on | Original release date |
|---|---|---|---|---|
| 41 | 1 | "One of a Kind" | Original teleplay by Marjorie L. Sigley and Harry Winer | September 27, 1978 |
Carrie Williams (Diane Baker), a free-spirited woman realizes her daughter Lizzie (Stephanie Brown) is no longer a child and experiments with giving her more independence. However, the girl is puzzled by this sudden lack of attention and feels as if her mom is pushing her away.
| 42 | 2 | "A Home Run For Love" | Thank You, Jackie Robinson by Barbara Cohen | October 11, 1978 |
In 1947, young white boy, Sammy Green (Ronnie Scribner) and Davy Henderson (Charles Lampkin), an elderly black man, enjoy a warm and wonderful friendship based on their mutual love of the Brooklyn Dodgers and of Jackie Robinson in particular. Co-starring Felicity Huffman, Anne Ramsey and Edie McClurg.
| 43 | 3 | "Gaucho" | Gaucho by Gloria Gonzalez | October 25, 1978 |
A young New York boy knows his mother misses her Puerto Rican homeland. Accordingly, he becomes an errand boy for a small-time hood, in order to earn enough money so she can move back to the Caribbean. Co-starring Danny De La Paz.
| 44 | 4 | "Dinky Hocker" | Dinky Hocker Shoots Smack by M. E. Kerr | December 12, 1978 |
Overweight teenager Susan "Dinky" Hocker (Wendie Jo Sperber) is obsessed with food and cannot stop eating. Finally she turns to a friend who helps her change her eating habits. Co-starring June Lockhart and Alan Oppenheimer as Dinky's parents.
| 45 | 5 | "Make Believe Marriage" | Original teleplay by Jeffrey Kindley | February 14, 1979 |
High school students (James Carroll, Janina Mathews, Alexa Kenin, Bea Bevis, Lonny Price, David Paymer and Amy DeMayo) take a marriage course where they are coupled up and must complete assorted everyday tasks that go with married life. Co-starring Janina Mathews of The Electric Company fame.
| 46 | 6 | "The Terrible Secret" | Original teleplay by George Malko | March 5, 1979 |
After teenage Bobbie Marston (Linda Grovenor) commits a hit and run, guilt takes its toll on her everyday life. Co-starring Michael Biehn and Dan Monahan.
| 47 | 7 | "Seven Wishes of a Rich Kid" | Original teleplay by Jeffrey Kindley | May 9, 1979 |
Wealthy but lonely Calvin Brundage (Robbie Rist) is granted seven wishes by a genie. Calvin uses them in an effort to impress Melanie Gamble (Cynthia Nixon), the most popular girl in his school. But things don't work out the way he anticipated. Co-starring Christopher Hewett and Butterfly McQueen.

=== Season 8 (1979–80) ===
| No. overall | No. in season | Title | Based on | Original release date |
|---|---|---|---|---|
| 48 | 1 | "Which Mother Is Mine?" | My Other Mother by Joan Oppenheimer | September 26, 1979 |
Sixteen-year-old Alexandria (Melissa Sue Anderson) is stunned when her biological mother arrives to take her away from her adoptive parents. Co-starring Marion Ross and Woody Eney. Directed by Arthur Allan Seidelman
| 49 | 2 | "A Movie Star's Daughter" | Original teleplay by Jeffrey Kindley | October 10, 1979 |
When shy teenager Dena (Trini Alvarado) enrolls in a new school, she doesn't make friends easily until they discover that her father is famous actor Hal McKain (Frank Converse). Overnight, she becomes the most popular student in school—but this brings its own problems.
| 50 | 3 | "A Special Gift" | A Special Gift by Marcia L. Simon | October 24, 1979 |
Peter, a 14-year-old basketball player (Stephen Austin) shows a real talent for ballet and wants to pursue dancing, but he worries what friends and family will think of his decision. Co-starring real-life brothers Al and Ike Eisenmann. Directed by Arthur Allan Seidelman
| 51 | 4 | "The Late Great Me! Story of a Teenage Alcoholic" | The Late Great Me by Sandra Scoppettone | November 14, 1979 |
Geri Peters (Maia Danziger), a 15-year-old girl takes up drinking to impress a boy named Dave Townsend (Charley Lang); instead, she soon develops a serious problem.
| 52 | 5 | "The Heartbreak Winner: One Girl's Struggle For Olympic Gold" | The Gold Test by Michael Bonadies. | February 13, 1980 |
Ambitious teenage figure skater Maggie MacDonald (Melissa Sherman) learns what champions are truly made of when she meets a paraplegic youngster. Directed by Bruce Malmuth
| 53 | 6 | "Where Do Teenagers Come From?" | Original teleplay | March 5, 1980 |
Twelve-year-old girl wonders about all of the changes happening to her body. Sequel to My Mom's Having a Baby.
| 54 | 7 | "What Are Friends For?" | What are Friends For? by Mildred Ames | March 19, 1980 |
Two inseparable 12-year-old girls (Melora Hardin, Dana Hill), each one the daughter of a separate divorcing couple, are determined to keep their friendship alive despite the odds. Directed by Stephen Gyllenhaal

=== Season 9 (1980–81) ===
| No. overall | No. in season | Title | Based on | Original release date |
|---|---|---|---|---|
| 55 | 1 | "A Family of Strangers" | Original teleplay by Len Jenkin and Jeffrey Kindley | September 24, 1980 |
A widower (Danny Aiello) with two daughters marries a widow with one daughter, creating a stepfamily.
| 56 | 2 | "Schoolboy Father" | He's My Baby Now by Jeannette Eyerly | October 15, 1980 |
When high school senior Charles Elderberry (Rob Lowe) discovers that his summer girlfriend has given birth to his child, he decides to fight for custody. Co-starring Dana Plato, Sharon Spelman, and Nancy McKeon.
| 57 | 3 | "The Gymnast" | Original teleplay by Ann M. Beckett, Len Janson and Durrell Royce Crays | October 28, 1980 |
Holly Gagnier stars as 16-year-old Ginny Coker, who's determined to become a world-class athlete.
| 58 | 4 | "Stoned" | Original teleplay by John Herzfeld | November 12, 1980 |
Jack (Scott Baio) is a motivated high schooler until he experiments with marijuana and falls in with a fast crowd. Will he wise up before it's too late? Co-starring Largo Woodruff (The Funhouse, Coward of the County) and Anthony C. Sena.
| 59 | 5 | "A Matter of Time" | A Matter of Time by Roni Schotter | February 11, 1981 |
Teenager Lisl Gilbert (Karlene Crockett) must find the inner strength to deal with her mother Jean's (Rosemary Forsyth) impending death from cancer. Co-starring Rob Lowe. Adapted from the book by Roni Schotter.
| 60 | 6 | "Run, Don't Walk" | Original teleplay by Durrell Royce Crays | March 4, 1981 |
A teenage girl does not know how to deal with being in a wheelchair, after an accident leaves her paralyzed. Then she befriends a boy in the same situation, and the future suddenly looks brighter for both of them. Starring Toni Kalem, Scott Baio, Dee Wallace, and Hal Williams.
| 61 | 7 | "My Mother Was Never a Kid" | Hangin' Out With Cici by Francine Pascal | March 18, 1981 |
Teenager Victoria Martin (Mary Beth Manning) is convinced that her mother Felicia (Holland Taylor) does not understand the younger generation. Mysteriously, she is sent back in time and meets her mother as a teenager.

=== Season 10 (1981–82) ===
| No. overall | No. in season | Title | Based on | Original release date |
|---|---|---|---|---|
| 62 | 1 | "She Drinks a Little" | First Step by Anne Snyder | September 23, 1981 |
Sixteen-year-old Cindy Scott (Amanda Wyss) and her younger brother Brett gradually wise up to their single mother Miriam's (Bonnie Bartlett) drinking problem. Cindy wonders if she should join Alateen for help. Directed by Arthur Allan Seidelman
| 63 | 2 | "Starstruck" | Original teleplay by Marisa Giofre | October 14, 1981 |
An aspiring teen folk singer (Trini Alvarado) is torn whether to continue her singing or to accept an educational scholarship. Co-starring Lee Curreri.
| 64 | 3 | "Tough Girl" | Will the Real Renie Lake Please Stand Up? by Barbara Morgenroth | October 28, 1981 |
A streetwise teenager from inner-city Los Angeles (Karin Argoud) is sent to live in the suburbs with her father's new family. Laurence Lau also appears.
| 65 | 4 | "The Color of Friendship" | What Happened to Marston by Nancy Garden | November 11, 1981 |
Two teenagers, one black and one white, hit it off. Starring James Bond III, Chris Barnes, Cleavon Little, and Kadeem Hardison.
| 66 | 5 | "The Unforgivable Secret" | Tell Me No Lies by Hila Colman | February 10, 1982 |
Amanda Plummer portrays a 15-year-old who's stunned to discover that her "deceased" father is very much alive, and that's just the beginning of the story. Co-starring Barbara Feldon and Danny Aiello.
| 67 | 6 | "Daddy, I'm Their Mama Now" | The Night Swimmers by Betsy Byars | March 3, 1982 |
Retta Rollins (Mallie Jackson), a 12-year-old girl assumes responsibility for her two younger brothers Johnny and Roy (Jason Lively and Jason Hervey), after their mother dies.
| 68 | 7 | "Sometimes I Don't Love My Mother" | Original teleplay by Carolyn Miller and Daryl Warner | April 7, 1982 |
After her father's death, teenager Dallas Davis (Melinda Culea) struggles with her mother Ellen's (Patricia Elliott) total dependency on her.

=== Season 11 (1982–83) ===
| No. overall | No. in season | Title | Based on | Original release date |
|---|---|---|---|---|
| 69 | 1 | "Amy & the Angel" | Original teleplay by Bruce Harmon and Harold Peters | September 22, 1982 |
Depressed 17-year-old high-schooler Amy Watson (Helen Slater) is visited by aspiring guardian angel Oliver after wishing she had never been born. As with George Bailey and Clarence in It's a Wonderful Life, Oliver shows Amy how important she is to the people in her life, particularly her divorced mom, her paternal grandfather (David Huddleston), and her best friend (who's a lot more troubled than Amy realizes). The twist is that Oliver himself committed suicide and, as a punishment, was forced to roam the world for years afterward, witnessing the repercussions of his action. Now senior angel Gabriel (James Earl Jones) is giving Oliver a chance to redeem himself by making sure Amy doesn't make Oliver's mistake. Also starring Matthew Modine and Meg Ryan.
| 70 | 2 | "Between Two Loves" | Two Loves for Jenny by Sandra Peden Miller | October 27, 1982 |
Susan Adams (Karlene Crockett) is a teen violinist is torn between her musical career and her boyfriend. Co-starring Robert Reed, Lance Guest and Barbara Tarbuck.
| 71 | 3 | "A Very Delicate Matter" | Original teleplay by Marisa Giofre | November 10, 1982 |
Teenager Kristin Sorenson (Lori-Nan Engler) is shocked when a former boyfriend Greg Pscharapolus (Zach Galligan) tells her he has gonorrhea. Not only does she get tested, she must tell her current boyfriend Eddie Burak (John Didrichsen) to get tested as well.
| 72 | 4 | "Please Don't Hit Me, Mom" | Original teleplay by Sydney Julien and Jeri Taylor | January 19, 1983 |
Teenager Nancy Parks (Nancy McKeon) stumbles upon a case of child abuse. It turns out her new boyfriend's (Lance Guest) younger brother is regularly beaten and emotionally abused by their overworked mom (Patty Duke, whose real-life son Sean Astin portrays the victimized little boy).
| 73 | 5 | "The Woman Who Willed a Miracle" | Original teleplay by Arthur Heinemann | February 9, 1983 |
A blind, developmentally disabled infant with cerebral palsy is left in the care of an elderly English woman who refuses to let him die. Starring Cloris Leachman, M. Emmet Walsh, James Noble, and Kirk Cameron.
| 74 | 6 | "Have You Ever Been Ashamed of Your Parents?" | Original teleplay by Chris Manheim | March 16, 1983 |
Kari Michaelsen and Jennifer Jason Leigh star as two teenagers—one rich, the other middle-class—who become best friends over the summer. Co-starring Marion Ross and Julie Piekarski.
| 75 | 7 | "But It's Not My Fault" | Original teleplay by Ray Cunneff, Sydney Julien and Jeri Taylor | March 22, 1983 |
Billy Warlock portrays 16-year-old Craig Foster, whose efforts to prove himself to his peers land him in juvenile hall. Co-starring Al White.
| 76 | 8 | "The Wave" | Original teleplay by Johnny Dawkins | March 30, 1983 |
High school teacher (Bruce Davison) decides to conduct a social experiment, asking his students to take part. What they don't know is that the experiment is on mind control. (Previously broadcast on ABC in October 1981 as a standalone special.)

=== Season 12 (1983–84) ===
| No. overall | No. in season | Title | Based on | Original release date |
|---|---|---|---|---|
| 77 | 1 | "It's No Crush, I'm in Love" | Original teleplay by Judy Engles | September 21, 1983 |
A high-school girl (Cynthia Nixon) has a crush on a soap-opera star and believes she's in love with him. At school, her new English teacher (Mark LaMura) closely resembles the soap star.
| 78 | 2 | "The Hand-Me-Down Kid" | The Hand-Me-Down Kid by Francine Pascal | October 19, 1983 |
Tired of receiving hand-me-downs from her sister, an 11-year-old girl "secretly borrows" her bicycle, which then gets stolen. Tracey Gold and Cheryl Arutt portray the sisters; Terry O'Quinn plays their dad. Also starring Corey Parker and Martha Plimpton.
| 79 | 3 | "The Celebrity and the Arcade Kid" | Original teleplay by Virginia L. Carter, Fern Field and Michael McGreevey | November 19, 1983 |
Video-arcade whiz and teen movie star discover they are exact doubles and decide to switch identities. A modern version of Mark Twain's The Prince and The Pauper.
| 80 | 4 | "Andrea's Story: A Hitchhiking Tragedy" | Did You Hear What Happened to Andrea? by Gloria D. Miklowitz | December 7, 1983 |
Teenage Andrea Cranston (Michele Greene) is traumatized after surviving an assault by a stranger from whom she hitched a ride. Co-starring Moosie Drier, Carrie Snodgress (as Andrea's mom), Robert DoQui and Kirk Cameron.
| 81 | 5 | "The Great Love Experiment" | Original teleplay by Jeffrey Kindley | February 8, 1984 |
Teenagers bait a timid girl to get her involved with various displays of affection. Starring Tracy Pollan, Kelly Wolf (Graveyard Shift, Margaret), Pete Kowanko (Solarbabies, Date with an Angel), and Jennifer Grey.
| 82 | 6 | "Backwards: The Riddle of Dyslexia" | Original teleplay by Arthur Heinemann and story by Franklin Thompson | March 7, 1984 |
Real-life brothers River and Leaf Phoenix star in this tale of a 13-year-old boy who has reading problems which his teachers attribute to laziness. It is ultimately discovered that he has dyslexia.
| 83 | 7 | "The Hero Who Couldn't Read" | Original teleplay by Johnny Dawkins and Adoley Odunton | April 18, 1984 |
A teacher discovers that one of his students, the school's star basketball player, is illiterate and makes it his mission to teach him to read. Starring Clarence Williams III; with Kareem Abdul-Jabbar and Michael Dorn.

=== Season 13 (1984–85) ===
| No. overall | No. in season | Title | Based on | Original release date |
|---|---|---|---|---|
| 84 | 1 | "Summer Switch" | Summer Switch by Mary Rodgers | September 19, 1984 |
Bill Andrews (Robert Klein) magically switches personalities with his teenage son Ben (Scott Schwartz) and comical chaos ensues in this sequel to Freaky Friday. Directed by Ken Kwapis.
| 85 | 2 | "Out of Step" | Original teleplay by Richard Glatzer | October 10, 1984 |
An aspiring teenage dancer gets the chance to try out for a dance troupe, but fear of failure might keep her from auditioning. Terry Donahoe stars as Lisa Williams.
| 86 | 3 | "The Almost Royal Family" | Meanwhile, Back At the Castle by Hope Campbell | October 24, 1984 |
A family inherits a house on a tiny island between Canada and the United States, outside the jurisdiction of either country. Sarah Jessica Parker stars.
| 87 | 4 | "Mom's on Strike" | Original teleplay by Judy Engles | November 14, 1984 |
An overworked homemaker goes on strike to persuade her family to share household chores. Co-starring Yeardley Smith, George Gaynes, Jonathan Ward, and Sam McMurray.
| 88 | 5 | "I Want to Go Home" | Original teleplay by Jeanne Betancourt | February 13, 1985 |
Tom Junior and Mary Sanders (Seth Green, Maddie Corman) go on the run with their divorced mom Louise (Lindsay Crouse), then realize that she is kidnapping them from their dad Tom Senior (John Getz).
| 89 | 6 | "First the Egg" | First the Egg by Louise Moeri | March 6, 1985 |
A group of high-school students take part in a parenting class where their first assignment is to 'parent' an egg. Starring Justine Bateman, Jimmy McNichol, Chris Hebert, and Helene Udy.
| 90 | 7 | "One Too Many" | Original teleplay by Bruce Harmon | May 21, 1985 |
Actor Peter Horton directed this tale of four high-school friends (Lance Guest, Val Kilmer, Michelle Pfeiffer, and Mare Winningham) who find their lives changed forever when one of them drives drunk with devastating results. This special was originally shown in prime-time.

=== Season 14 (1985–86) ===
| No. overall | No. in season | Title | Original release date |
|---|---|---|---|
| 91 | 1 | "No Greater Gift" | September 11, 1985 |
Anson Williams co-wrote and directed this tale of two terminally ill boys who hit it off in a hospital ward. One makes the ultimate sacrifice to give the other a fighting chance at life. Co-starring Betty Thomas, Jeff Cohen and Ajay Naidu.
| 92 | 2 | "Cindy Eller: A Modern Fairy Tale" | October 9, 1985 |
Actress Lee Grant directed this contemporary remake of Cinderella aimed at preteens. Starring Pearl Bailey, Kyra Sedgwick (in the title role), Jennifer Grey, Kelly Wolf, Grant Show, Melanie Mayron, Stephen Keep Mills, and Sylvia Miles.
| 93 | 3 | "Don't Touch" | November 6, 1985 |
After a teenage babysitter discovers that her young charge is being molested by a family friend, harrowing memories of her own past molestation by her uncle resurface. Co-starring Blair Brown, Corey Parker, John Glover, Lisa Bonet and Danielle Carin; featuring real-life brothers Joey and Matthew Lawrence.
| 94 | 4 | "High School Narc" | December 4, 1985 |
A 22-year-old police officer (Michael E. Knight) poses as a student to sniff out the drug supplier for an inner-city high school. Nancy Travis, Greg Germann, Don Harvey, Joie Gallo and Viggo Mortensen appear.
| 95 | 5 | "Can a Guy Say No?" | February 12, 1986 |
A 17-year-old student learns how deceiving looks can be when he befriends the prettiest girl in school and discovers that her beauty compensates for unhappiness and low self-esteem...or does it? Starring Steve Antin, Heather Langenkamp, Christa Denton, Khrystyne Haje, and Beau Bridges.
| 96 | 6 | "Are You My Mother?" | March 5, 1986 |
Teenager Britney Gordon (Beth Miller) is stunned to discover that her supposedly-deceased mother is actually mentally ill and institutionalized. Co-starring Marian Mercer, Michael York and Sheree North.
| 97 | 7 | "Getting Even: A Wimp's Revenge" | March 19, 1986 |
Tired of being bullied at school, Jeffrey Childs (Jon Rothstein) starts drawing a master scientist. He begins to imagine what it would be like, as the scientist, standing up to the bullies at school. Directed by James Scott and starring Adolph Caesar, Michael Storm and Marisa Berenson.

=== Season 15 (1986–87) ===
| No. overall | No. in season | Title | Original release date |
|---|---|---|---|
| 98 | 1 | "A Desperate Exit" | September 19, 1986 |
When his best friend dies by suicide, a stunned teenager is left with one unanswered question: Why? Based on Eve Bunting's novel Face at the Edge of the World; co-starring Malcolm-Jamal Warner and Rob Stone.
| 99 | 2 | "Wanted: The Perfect Guy" | October 1, 1986 |
Sensing that his widowed mom Ellie (Madeline Kahn) is lonely and looking for companionship, 13-year-old Danny Coleman (Ben Affleck) places a personal ad for "The Perfect Guy". Co-starring Keith Szarabajka.
| 100 | 3 | "Teen Father" | October 22, 1986 |
Actor Kevin Hooks directed this tale of a college-bound 18-year-old (Corey Parker) whose life is turned upside-down when his 16-year-old girlfriend announces that she is pregnant.
| 101 | 4 | "The Gift of Amazing Grace" | November 19, 1986 |
A teenager (Tempestt Bledsoe) is frustrated about being the only member of her gospel-singing family who cannot carry a tune. When she writes a song about her problems, she discovers that she's got musical talent after all, just not where she or anybody else suspected. Co-starring Della Reese.
| 102 | 5 | "Supermom's Daughter" | February 18, 1987 |
A career-driven woman opposes her daughter's future plans. Starring Barbara Bosson and Marisa Tomei.
| 103 | 6 | "Divorced Kids' Blues" | March 4, 1987 |
A 15-year-old struggles through the politics of divorce as his parents split up. Written by Donald Margulies.
| 104 | 7 | "Class Act: A Teacher's Story" | March 18, 1987 |
A wealthy businessman returns to teaching after conquering the stock market. He inherits a class of underachievers and sets out to make them winners. Starring Ralph Garman.
| 105 | 8 | "Read Between the Lines" | June 3, 1987 |
When an illiterate toy maker has the right to his invention stolen, his grandson and the Harlem Globetrotters team up to get them back.

=== Season 16 (1987–88) ===
| No. overall | No. in season | Title | Original release date |
|---|---|---|---|
| 106 | 1 | "Just a Regular Kid: An AIDS Story" | September 9, 1987 |
Teenager Kevin Casio (Christian Hoff) discovers he has been infected with AIDS by a blood transfusion. Co-starring Florence Henderson and Ronny Cox as Kevin's parents; featuring Lewis Arquette as one of his doctors.
| 107 | 2 | "The Kid Who Wouldn't Quit: The Brad Silverman Story" | September 23, 1987 |
True story about a teen with Down syndrome who begins attending college classes.
| 108 | 3 | "The Day My Kid Went Punk" | October 23, 1987 |
Teenage musician Terry (Jay Underwood) hopes to distinguish himself from "the crowd", by becoming a punk rocker. Also starring Bernie Kopell, Albert Hague, and James Noble.
| 109 | 4 | "Seasonal Differences" | December 2, 1987 |
A Christmas Nativity scene is displayed at a high school, where it sparks debate and protest from the student body; this leads to the separation of church and state being examined, formally, and in depth. Co-starring Megan Follows, Timothy Owen Waldrip, Melba Moore and Uta Hagen. Frank Whaley, Jonathan Tiersten, Meg Myles, P. J. Ochlan and Gabrielle Carteris appear in the cast.
| 110 | 5 | "Terrible Things My Mother Told Me" | January 20, 1988 |
Hard-working 16-year-old Julia (Katherine Kamhi) does not realize that her mother Eleanor (Beth Howland) - who alternately harasses and ignores Julia, while doting on lazy younger daughter Katie (Ita DeMarco) - is being emotionally and verbally abusive. But when Julia gets the lead in a school play directed by popular Randy (Ian Ziering), she realizes she's every bit as worthy of Eleanor's support and encouragement as is her pampered sister.
| 111 | 6 | "Daddy Can't Read" | March 16, 1988 |
Teenager Alison Watson (Cheryl Arutt) does not understand why her father Bill (Edward Albert) opposes her campaign to promote literacy at his factory until she discovers that he cannot read. Co-starring Joey Travolta, Michael Jackson (as himself), gymnast Cathy Rigby, and Richard Roundtree.

=== Season 17 (1988–89) ===
| No. overall | No. in season | Title | Original release date |
|---|---|---|---|
| 112 | 1 | "Date Rape" | September 15, 1988 |
A teenage girl goes on a date with the most popular boy in her school—who rapes her. Co-starring John Savage, David Patrick Kelly, and Gabrielle Carteris.
| 113 | 2 | "A Family Again" | October 15, 1988 |
In this recollection of Ordinary People, a family must come to grips with the sudden death of their eldest daughter (Sherilyn Fenn). With Jill Eikenberry and Michael Tucker; also featuring Judith Barsi, Rob Stone, Ricki Lake, Rhea Perlman, and Tonya Crowe. This special was originally shown in primetime under the name "ABC Family Theater", and was dedicated to Judith Barsi. Barsi (who portrayed Billie Foster, a little girl struggling with the idea of why God would take her elder sister's life) was murdered on July 25, 1988, less than three months before the episode debuted.
| 114 | 3 | "Tattle: When to Tell on a Friend" | October 27, 1988 |
Maggie (Allison Smith), Sandy (Amy Benedict), Linda (Marisol Rodriguez), and Colleen (Tammy Lauren) have been an inseparable foursome since grammar school. Now in the 11th grade, all four are on their school's medley/relay swim team, with a shot at the state finals. But cocaine use is seriously jeopardizing their performance. Casually introduced to cocaine by Colleen, Sandy is pressured into trying the drug, although Maggie and Linda decline. The negative effect on their swimming is quickly noticeable; worse, personality changes are leading to increasingly bizarre behavior. Maggie feels especially pressured. Colleen steals money from her father's ice cream store, which costs Maggie her job there. She knows Colleen stole the money, but hesitates to "break the code" against blowing the proverbial whistle. After unsuccessfully confronting Sandy and Colleen about their drug problem, Maggie and Linda debate whether or not to tell the coach of their swim team; neither is sure about the ethics of "squealing" in a situation like this one. Then, at the afterschool play-group which Colleen and Sandy run, a toddler almost drowns in the backyard swimming pool. The tykes have been left unattended, while Sandy and Colleen are on the phone making a drug deal. In view of the danger which Colleen and Sandy pose, not just to themselves but to others, Maggie and Linda pass what they know on to their swim-coach. Will things ever be the same between these four girls? Katharine Ross and Bibi Besch also appear.
| 115 | 4 | "Taking a Stand" | January 19, 1989 |
An entire neighborhood examines their feelings of racism after the home of a black family is vandalized by a neighbor. Co-starring Dan Lauria, Betty Buckley, and Michael Beach.
| 116 | 5 | "Just Tipsy, Honey" | March 16, 1989 |
Teenager Patty Adams (Ellie Cornell) is in total denial about her mother Carolyn's (Joanna Pettet) drinking problem, which is glaringly evident to everybody else. Adapted from Picking up the Pieces by Michael Bonadies.
| 117 | 6 | "The Cheats" | March 30, 1989 |
Three girls, Holly Mitchell (Heather McAdam), Lynnie Ryan (Christine Langner) and Beth Davis (Dana Behr), steal the answers to their final exam. When Judith Daniels (Daphne Maxwell Reid), the headmistress, finds out she gives those responsible one day to confess before she expels and/or prosecutes everybody with any connection—no matter how remote—to the theft/cover-up.
| 118 | 7 | "Torn Between Two Fathers" | April 20, 1989 |
Actor Richard Masur directed this tale of a divorced couple's teenage daughter who wages a custody battle of her own: After her natural mother dies in an accident, she sues her biological father for the right to live with her disabled stepdad. Singer Pat Benatar appears as the character Donna.

=== Season 18 (1989–90) ===
| No. overall | No. in season | Title | Original release date |
|---|---|---|---|
| 119 | 1 | "My Dad Can't Be Crazy...Can He?" | September 14, 1989 |
Actress Joanna Lee wrote and directed this tale of a teenager and his mom (Wil Wheaton, Loretta Swit) who make up their minds how to deal with a husband/father (Don Murray) who has schizophrenia.
| 120 | 2 | "Private Affairs" | October 26, 1989 |
Teenager Madeline (Kerri Green) discovers her father's affair with her mother's best friend. Will it tear her family apart? Co-starring Christopher Daniel Barnes, Michael Warren, Nancy Kulp, Lynne Thigpen, Wendy Brainard, and Christopher Collet.
| 121 | 3 | "A Town's Revenge" | November 30, 1989 |
Teenager Eric Nelson (Keith Coogan) urges his town to farm without the use of pesticides, but many of these farmers are resistant to change.
| 122 | 4 | "All That Glitters" | January 25, 1990 |
Several high school students (including Marc Price) learn about ethics versus seductive power when they start a cookie company as their class project. Co-starring William H. Macy.
| 123 | 5 | "Over the Limit" | February 22, 1990 |
High-schooler Matt Thompson (Keith Coogan) must decide whether to come forward with the truth about a tragic drunk-driving crash. Co-starring Sam Rockwell.
| 124 | 6 | "The Perfect Date" | April 19, 1990 |
A 16-year-old student is sure that his upcoming date with the school prom queen will be perfect. But the way the evening unfolds is far from perfect. Co-starring Will Smith, Art LaFleur, and Charles Hallahan.

=== Season 19 (1990–91) ===
| No. overall | No. in season | Title | Original release date |
|---|---|---|---|
| 125 | 1 | "A Question About Sex" | September 13, 1990 |
Tracey Gold portrays Shauna Kelly, a cheerleader who advocates sex education at local Francis Scott Key High School. As a result, she locks horns with her mother Joanne (Cindy Pickett) who's angling for re-election to the school board. Directed by Tom Skerritt, who also has a cameo as the father of Shauna's pregnant classmate; co-starring Kristin Dattilo, Renée Estevez, and Vince Vaughn.
| 126 | 2 | "Testing Dirty" | October 18, 1990 |
Having never used illegal drugs in his life, model teenager Will Hatch (Christopher Daniel Barnes)—a competitive swimmer who works as delivery boy for a medical clinic—is shocked when he tests positive for amphetamines (actually, it was medication for swimmer's ear)...all the more so when "speed" is found in his locker (which school security forcibly searches, in his absence, over the test results). No less shocked are: his mom Linda (Alley Mills) and his girlfriend Carla (Lisa Dean Ryan), who believe in his innocence; swim-team coach Stanley Daniels (Chris Rich) and high-school Principal Stone (Art LaFleur), who do not. It doesn't help when Stan—who's also Carla's father and Linda's fiancé—turns against his own daughter, after Stone expels Carla for refusing to take the same drug test as Will. Adam Sandler has a bit role as a pusher.
| 127 | 3 | "Stood Up!" | December 6, 1990 |
After getting stood up for the prom, Becky Noonan (Lucy Deakins) sues her date. Jan Miner, Adam LeFevre and Ellen Parker appear in the cast.
| 128 | 4 | "The Less-Than-Perfect Daughter" | January 24, 1991 |
A demanding woman and her daughter knock heads when the daughter (Robyn Lively), aspiring to be less reliant on her family, moves in with a troubled friend (Andrea Elson). Robyn's real-life father Ernie Lively portrays her character's dad. Co-starring Renee O'Connor.
| 129 | 5 | "It's Only Rock & Roll" | March 21, 1991 |
A teenage musician (Alison Bartlett) finds her song lyrics being scrutinized as too suggestive. Co-starring Davy Jones and Carole King.

=== Season 20 (1991–92) ===
| No. overall | No. in season | Title | Original release date |
|---|---|---|---|
| 130 | 1 | "In the Shadow of Love: A Teen AIDS Story" | September 18, 1991 |
Two high-school journalists write a story about a teen HIV support group and are stunned by some of the stories they hear.
| 131 | 2 | "Summer Stories: The Mall – Part 1" | March 19, 1992 |
Three-part series about high-school graduates contemplating their futures while working at the mall. In "First Impressions", Sarah Charney (Mara Hobel) has mixed sentiments about meeting her birth mother for the first time. Jorja Fox, Barbara Barrie and Kelly Bishop appear in the cast. Kathie Lee Gifford makes a cameo appearance.
| 132 | 3 | "Summer Stories: The Mall – Part 2" | April 2, 1992 |
In "Second Chances", a girl struggles with mixed feelings about her widowed mother's upcoming remarriage.
| 133 | 4 | "Summer Stories: The Mall – Part 3" | April 16, 1992 |
In "Temptations" the gang prepares to go their separate ways as summer winds down. Meanwhile, a recovering teenage alcoholic struggles to stay sober when an old drinking buddy shows up. Co-starring Todd Graff.

=== Season 21 (1992–93) ===
| No. overall | No. in season | Title | Original release date |
|---|---|---|---|
| 134 | 1 | "Surviving a Break-up" | October 1, 1992 |
Oprah Winfrey moderates a panel of teens, celebrities and experts to discuss surviving the end of a relationship.
| 135 | 2 | "Shades of a Single Protein" | January 28, 1993 |
Oprah Winfrey moderates a panel of teens discussing race relations in America.
| 136 | 3 | "Learning Not to Hurt" | March 18, 1993 |
Roz Abrams hosts a special report on youth violence and later moderates a panel discussion.
| 137 | 4 | "Girlfriend" | April 15, 1993 |
Two teenage girls, LaChrista (Samaria Graham), who is black, and Lynda (Rinnan Henderson), who is white, become friends while working on a mural to honor a black classmate killed by random gunfire.

=== Season 22 (1993–94) ===
| No. overall | No. in season | Title | Original release date |
|---|---|---|---|
| 138 | 1 | "Love Hurts" | September 16, 1993 |
16-year-old Christie (Holly Shaw) turns to a support group when her boyfriend begins to physically abuse her.
| 139 | 2 | "Montana Crossroads" | December 9, 1993 |
Julia Morrow-Wheeler (Jacklyn Zeman) struggles with her daughter Samantha (Kellie Martin) wanting to leave the nest...and her father Frank's (Don Murray) reluctance to enter a retirement home. Co-starring Michael Cutt (California Dreams).
| 140 | 3 | "I Hate the Way I Look" | March 21, 1994 |
Oprah Winfrey moderates a panel of teens, celebrities and experts to discuss the obsession teens have with their appearance.
| 141 | 4 | "Jacqui's Dilemma" | June 2, 1994 |
Jacqui (Melissa Lozoff), a pregnant 16-year-old girl, examines her choices over what to do with her unborn baby amidst interviews with teens, parents, educators, counselors, social workers, and doctors that amplify the issues. Joycelyn Elders, who was the Surgeon General of the United States appears for a discussion.

=== Season 23 (1994–95) ===
| No. overall | No. in season | Title | Original release date |
|---|---|---|---|
| 142 | 1 | "Boys Will Be Boys: The Ali Cooper Story" | September 15, 1994 |
Not to be confused with the same-named TV series, this chronicles the ordeal of a high-school marching band-member (Ami Dolenz) who becomes the victim of sexual harassment by several male classmates, including some close friends of her elder brother, Steve (David "Viper" Lipper of Full House fame). Fortunately, he takes her side. Ali and her family decide upon suing the school after Principal Pritchard (Steven Gilborn) cites the title excuse instead of doing anything to protect her. Directed by Joan Van Ark, who also portrays Ali and Steve's mom; Larry Wilcox plays their dad. Also starring Jeremy Jordan and Danny Cooksey.
| 143 | 2 | "Magical Make-Over" | December 8, 1994 |
Christine (Amy Hargreaves) is a teenage girl who desperately wants to be popular. One day an angel (BD Wong) grants her that wish by giving her a new image every day. Soon she wishes she could just be herself.
| 144 | 3 | "Bonnie Raitt Has Something to Talk About" | March 16, 1995 |
Whoopi Goldberg interviews musician/singer Bonnie Raitt about her life, career, and future plans.
| 145 | 4 | "Notes for My Daughter" | April 6, 1995 |
Teenager Dany Gardner (Grace Johnston) struggles with her mother Brenda's (Kate Burton) illness from breast cancer.
| 146 | 5 | "Long Road Home" | May 25, 1995 |
Teenager Hank Atkins (Micah Dyer) does not know what to think of his dad John's (Jameson Parker) new wife Amanda (Kristen Cloke), who's young enough to be his daughter. Then Hank takes a long road trip alone with Amanda.

=== Season 24 (1995–96) ===
| No. overall | No. in season | Title | Original release date |
|---|---|---|---|
| 147 | 1 | "Fast Forward" | September 21, 1995 |
A teenager is shown how being involved with booze will shape his life: ultimately, he will become a bombed-out derelict (Gerald McRaney).
| 148 | 2 | "Positive: A Journey Into AIDS" | December 7, 1995 |
Documentary following two actors from ABC's General Hospital (Kimberly McCullough, Michael Sutton) as they research and talk to people living with HIV and AIDS.
| 149 | 3 | "Just Chill" | January 24, 1996 |
After the senseless death of his twin brother, a teen drug pusher decides to seek revenge against all who have wronged him in the neighborhood.
| 150 | 4 | "Educating Mom" | March 14, 1996 |
Soccer mom Nancy Gallagher (Jane Kaczmarek) feels like a hypocrite when lecturing her kids Jason and Carly (Will Friedle, Lacey Chabert) about the importance of finishing one's education, since she's a high-school dropout. She decides to practice what she's been preaching by sharing classes with Jason. Co-starring Kevin Connolly.
| 151 | 5 | "Daddy's Girl" | April 18, 1996 |
Teenage girl Alicia (Elise Neal) reunites with her father for the first time in 10 years and yearns to reunite her family despite their opposition. Featuring Lauryn Hill as Alicia's friend Malika.
| 152 | 6 | "Through Thick & Thin" | June 11, 1996 |
Twin sisters, one slim and one overweight, magically switch personalities, giving them a new appreciation of each other.

=== Season 25 (1996–97) ===
| No. overall | No. in season | Title | Original release date |
|---|---|---|---|
| 153 | 1 | "Too Soon for Jeff" | September 12, 1996 |
In this adaptation of Marilyn Reynolds' novel, a high school senior's (Freddie Prinze Jr.) future plans change abruptly when he learns that his girlfriend is pregnant. Co-starring Ed Begley Jr., Breck Wilson, and Jessica Alba.
| 154 | 2 | "Me and My Hormones" | October 24, 1996 |
Three women from three generations deal with the various changes taking place in their lives. Starring Courtney Peldon, Marion Ross, Bruce Boxleitner, Sara Gilbert (whose real-life sister Melissa directed), and Chad Lowe.
| 155 | 3 | "Teenage Confidential" | December 5, 1996 |
Andrea Mattson's (Lauren Woodland) overprotective parents (Morgan Fairchild and Sam McMurray), out of excessive concern for their daughter's well-being, hire a private eye to shadow her every move. Predictably, this does much more harm than good. Co-starring Danny Cooksey.
| 156 | 4 | "Miracle at Trapper Creek" | January 23, 1997 |
Underprivileged and troubled teens join the Trapper Creek Jobs Corp in Montana to learn a trade, work in the wilderness, and achieve a solid work ethic.

== Reception ==
In 1993, TV Guide named the series the best kids' show of the 1980s.

== See also ==
- ABC Weekend Special
- The ABC Saturday Superstar Movie
- After school special
- CBS Schoolbreak Special
- Special Treat
