= Peanuts and Popcorn =

Canadian children's television series

- Genre: Children's television
- Country of origin: Canada
- Original language: English
- No. of seasons: 4

Production
- Running time: 60–90 minutes

Original release
- Network: CBC Television
- Release: 4 October 1975 – 31 March 1979

Peanuts and Popcorn is a Canadian children's television series that aired on CBC Television from 1975 to 1979.

== Premise ==
Peanuts and Popcorn marked the CBC's first effort at a Saturday morning programming block geared towards children. Each episode consisted of various short films, continuing short films series, animated shorts, international content, including the Canadian-produced The Undersea Adventures of Captain Nemo, an hour-long feature and an animated short. The White Stone, and Chico the Rainmaker were two of the serials included. Usually appearing at the end of many episodes of Peanuts and Popcorn was an episode of Simon in the Land of Chalk Drawings.

International films and specials featured included Me & Dad's New Wife (11 February 1978), which aired in the United States as an ABC Afterschool Special; and the British film Zoo Robbery, which was seen 18 February 1978.

Nada Harcourt (1975–1977) and Suzanne Garland (1977–1979) were the series co-ordinators.

== Scheduling ==
For the first three seasons (1975–1976 to 1977–1978), Peanuts and Popcorn was seen in a 90-minute time slot which was broadcast from 10:30 a.m. (Eastern) from the first Saturday of October until the last Saturday of March. In the 1978–1979 season, it was reduced to 60 minutes on Saturdays at 11:00 a.m. from 7 October 1978 to 31 March 1979.
