= My Mom's Having a Baby (ABC Afterschool Special) =

- ABC Afterschool Special episode
- Episode no.: Season 5 Episode 4
- Directed by: Larry Elikann
- Written by: Susan Fichter Kennedy; Elaine Evans Rushnell
- Original air date: February 16, 1977

"My Mom's Having a Baby" is a 1977 episode of the American television anthology series ABC Afterschool Special, which aired on February 16, 1977. The episode would be historic as it was the first television program of its kind in the United States to showcase the pregnancy process and conception to young people, using a combination of animation and live action.

== Premise ==
Upon learning that his mother is pregnant with what will be his brother, 10-year-old Petey Evans begins to wonder (through animated fantasies and flashbacks) about how babies are born, only to realize that those theories are not delivered by storks or popping out of a stomach. So, with help from his friends Oscar and Kelly, they go to a real expert who will be performing the delivery, Dr. Lendon Smith, who uses an animated film that explains in detail (via Smith's narration) of how a pregnancy begins and how the child is conceived.

The remaining portion of this program features an actual live birth being performed in front of the cameras, which was taken from a 1974 ABC's Wide World of Entertainment special called David Hartman: Birth & Babies. Actress Candace Farrell, who played the mother in this program, was pregnant at the time of filming the 1974 special, which resulted in the producers hiring her for this program.

== Awards ==
- This program won a Daytime Emmy Award in 1977 for Outstanding Children's Informational Special.

== Cast ==
- Shane Sinutko as Petey Evans
- Jarred Johnson as Oscar
- Rachel Longaker as Kelly Driscoll
- Lendon Smith as himself
- Candace Farrell as Anne Evans

== See also ==
- Where Do Teenagers Come From?, the 1980 sequel to this program.
