= Anna to the Infinite Power =

1983 film by Robert Wiemer

- Directed by: Robert Wiemer
- Written by: Robert Wiemer; Based on Anna to the Infinite Power by Mildred Ames
- Produced by: Bruce Graham
- Starring: Martha Byrne; Dina Merrill; Mark Patton; Donna Mitchell; Jack Gilford
- Cinematography: Glenn Kershaw
- Edited by: Peter Hammer
- Music by: Paul Baillargeon
- Production companies: Blue Marble Company; Film Gallery; Ned Kandel Productions
- Distributed by: RCA/Columbia Pictures Home Entertainment (video); Scorpion Releasing (DVD)
- Release date: 1982
- Running time: 105 min.
- Country: United States
- Language: English

Anna to the Infinite Power is a 1982 science-fiction thriller film about a young teenager who learns that she was the product of a cloning experiment. The film was based on the 1981 novel of the same name by Mildred Ames. It was produced by Ned Kandell Enterprises and Film Gallery, previously responsible for the American syndicated children's series Big Blue Marble, and many alumni from that program worked on the film. The film was never released theatrically, but premiered on the pay-cable service HBO and later appeared on home video. The film's signature score "Anna's Reverie" was composed by Paul Baillargeon, who wrote the music for the film and has a cameo in which he plays the music teacher of Anna's brother Rowan.

== Plot ==
Twelve-year-old Anna Hart of Flemington, New Jersey, a student at a school for gifted children, is a genius and a kleptomaniac who insults her teachers, has perfectly parted hair, gets headaches when she stares at fires and flickering lights, and suffers from strange, prophetic dreams. Michaela Dupont, a piano teacher who has been watching Anna and has kept photos of her and a similar-looking girl taken in 1970, moves in next door. Then Anna sees her exact double on local TV news when a commuter plane makes a forced landing nearby, and she learns that her double, Anna Smithson, has the same family setting as hers — the child of a scientist and a musician.

As Anna investigates, she learns about a woman named Anna Zimmerman, who has been dead 20 years, and that Anna herself was part of a cloning experiment by Zimmerman and that she will grow into a duplicate of Zimmerman herself. Anna further learns that her mother volunteered for the cloning project but her father wanted nothing to do with it. Anna dreams of Zimmerman's past — growing up during World War II as a Jew in Nazi-controlled Germany, where she, like the present Anna, was a pianist and child prodigy who would play a part in the Nazis' plans for the genetic engineering of humans. Anna begins behaving more like a normal little girl, and continues exploring her background with the help of her brother Rowan and secret assistance from Michaela.

Anna's mother and father take Anna to a facility at Albacore Island after the people involved in the cloning project want to re-evaluate Anna for a few days. While there, Anna becomes suspicious when the phone in her room is blocked and she is locked in her room. She is able to block the lock on her door one day and while exploring, she notices the other "Annas" in various rooms. Anna overhears Dr. Barrett and a nurse speaking about the failed experiments and how they will have to get rid of the girls. Rowan calls Anna by pretending to be Dr. Jelliff but when their call is cut off, he sneaks into the facility to see his sister. Anna and Rowan confront Dr. Jelliff, the person who continued Zimmerman's cloning experiments, who tells Anna that she is now a "normal" person and suggests she should change her name as a way to start a new life. After Anna and her brother go, Jelliff reveals to Michaela, whose assignment was supposed to be ensuring each Anna progressed, that he is secretly grooming yet another Anna to grow up to become the future Zimmerman and they plan to kill the remaining five Annas, including Hart and her family, shortly.

Jelliff's plans to eliminate the girls backfire when Michaela reveals herself to him as Anna Parkhurst, the original product of Zimmerman's cloning experiment; she was the girl that resembled Anna in the 1970 photo. Like her mother/creator, Parkhurst knows how to create the replicator. Because Jelliff had her parents killed and she is enraged by the experiments, Parkhurst turns the table on him by offering him the plans for the replicator in return for the safety of all of the Annas (including the one Jelliff is grooming), as well as an undisclosed location for Parkhurst to continue her work without interference, with a report sealed in an undisclosed location to be released should harm come to any of them. The movie ends with Jeliff considering her offer.

== Cast ==
- Dina Merrill - Sarah Hart
- Martha Byrne - Anna Hart/Anna Smithson/Anna Zimmerman/Eve
- Mark Patton - Rowan Hart
- Donna Mitchell - Michaela Dupont/Anna Parkhurst
- Jack Ryland - Graham Hart
- Loretta Devine - Ms. Benson
- Jack Gilford - Dr. Jelliff
- Gail Weed - Clara
- Virginia Stevens - Nurse Grap
- Marilyn Rockafellow - Mrs. Smithson
- John Wardwell - Farmer
- Susan Lowden - TV Newscaster
- Warren Watson - Dr. Barrett
- James Louis Fleming - Dr. Randall
- Julie Araskog - Nurse
- Kent Cottingham, Marshall Wieme - Furniture movers
- Stuart Cole, Gary Mitchel - Albacore security guards
- Paul Baillargeon - Rowan's music teacher
- Tomokazo Seki - Rob Lucci

== Release ==
The film premiered on the pay-cable service HBO. It was released by at least November 8, 1983, when it played in a 7 a.m. timeslot.

== Reception ==
Calling it "[a]n oddly engrossing cult item — sort of a Brady Bunch episode about cloning," TV Guide critic Frank Lovece, reviewing the VHS release, said that, "While the direction and cinematography are flat and the acting wooden, it's precisely this home-movie quality, this banal ordinariness, that makes the film's sinister, conspiratorial undertones all the more believably compelling" and that it climaxed with "a paranoid-conspiracy sequence that, unlike the rest of the movie, delivers some genuine suspense." Reviewing the DVD release, Mac McEntire of DVD Verdict, agreed that, "The final third of the movie, taking place in the oddball futuristic medical complex, generates a serious sense of paranoia, and has some suspenseful scenes of Anna sneaking around, just a few steps ahead of getting caught," but found "the pacing is off" and the ending "abrupt," and that the film overall "looks and feels just like one of those '70s TV cult shlockers like Bad Ronald and Don't Be Afraid of the Dark." He found Byrne's performance "just low-key enough to be realistic and heartfelt without being cutesy or annoying."

== Home media ==
In 1983 or 1984, RCA/Columbia Pictures Home Entertainment released the film on VHS video cassette. In 2010, Scorpion Releasing released the film on DVD with interviews with Martha Byrne and Mark Patton.

== Connections ==
The opening credits of the television series Big Blue Marble can also be seen in the film; the show's production company also co-produced this film.
