= Me & Dad's New Wife =

- ABC Afterschool Special episode
- Episode no.: Season 4 Episode 5
- Directed by: Larry Elikann
- Written by: Pat Nardo; Gloria Banta
- Based on: A Smart Kid Like You by Stella Pevsner
- Original air date: February 18, 1976

"Me & Dad's New Wife" is a 1976 episode of the American television anthology series ABC Afterschool Special, directed by Larry Elikann. The episode is based upon a Stella Pevsner book, A Smart Kid Like You. In this special presentation, 2 songs were played, such as "Metamorphosis" by John Fiddy and "All I Want to Be" by Danny Edwardson & Seamus Sell.

== Cast ==
- Kristy McNichol - Nina Beckwith
- Lance Kerwin - Buzz
- Betty Beaird - Charlotte Beckwith
- Melendy Britt - Dolores Beckwith
- Leif Garrett - Roger Nichols
- Alice Playten
- Ned Wilson - George Beckwith
- Alexa Kenin
- Susannah Mars
- Orlando Ruiz
