= Charles Kimbrough =

American actor (1936–2023)

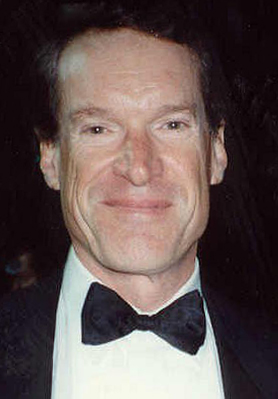
- Kimbrough at the 1989 Emmy Awards
- Born: May 23, 1936; St. Paul, Minnesota, U.S.
- Died: January 11, 2023 (aged 86); Culver City, California, U.S.
- Occupation: Actor
- Years active: 1950s–2018
- Spouses: Mary Jane Wilson (m. 1961; div. 1991) Beth Howland (m. 2002; died 2015)
- Children: 1

Charles Mayberry Kimbrough (May 23, 1936 – January 11, 2023) was an American actor. He was best known for his role as the straight-faced anchorman Jim Dial on Murphy Brown. In 1990, his performance in the role earned him a nomination for an Emmy Award for Outstanding Supporting Actor in a Comedy Series.

== Biography ==
Born in St. Paul, Minnesota, Kimbrough had extensive stage experience. He studied theater and drama at Indiana University Bloomington, and graduated in 1958. He earned a Masters of Fine Arts degree at Yale University's School of Drama. During the late 1960s and early 1970s, Kimbrough and his first wife Mary Jane Wilson were part of the resident company of the Milwaukee Repertory Theatre where they appeared in such plays as Georges Feydeau's Cat Among the Pigeons and Jules Feiffer's The White House Murder Case. In 1971, he was nominated for a Tony for best featured actor in a musical as Harry in Stephen Sondheim's Company. In 1984, he performed in the original Broadway cast of Sondheim's Sunday in the Park with George. He starred in the original Off-Broadway production of A.R. Gurney's comedy Sylvia in 1995.

Around 1976 to 1977, he appeared in a commercial for Chef Boyardee Spaghetti & Meatballs.

In 1988, Kimbrough was cast as Jim Dial, a veteran network news anchor with the integrity and experience of an Edward R. Murrow or Walter Cronkite, on the CBS sitcom Murphy Brown. The series ran for 247 episodes over ten seasons, winning 17 Emmy Awards and three Golden Globes. Kimbrough was nominated for a Primetime Emmy Award for Outstanding Supporting Actor in a Comedy Series in 1990.

In 1996, he voiced Victor, a gargoyle, in Disney's animated feature The Hunchback of Notre Dame, a role he reprised in its direct-to-video sequel, The Hunchback of Notre Dame II and Kingdom Hearts 3D: Dream Drop Distance.

Kimbrough was part of the cast of the Roundabout Theater Company's 2012 Broadway revival of Mary Chase's Pulitzer Prize-winning play Harvey playing William R. Chumley, M.D., with Jim Parsons in the lead as Elwood P. Dowd. The show ran from June 14 to August 5, 2012, at New York's Studio 54 Theatre.

Kimbrough later reprised his role as Jim Dial in the 2018 revival of Murphy Brown.

== Personal life and death ==
In 2002, Kimbrough married actress and fellow Company castmate Beth Howland, known for her television work as Vera Louise Gorman-Novak on the sitcom Alice. Howland died of lung cancer in December 2015 at the age of 74. Her death was not reported to the media until May 24, 2016.

Kimbrough's son, John, founded, sang and played guitar for the St. Paul-based alternative rock band Walt Mink.

He was an Episcopalian and he and Beth Howland were greatly involved within the Episcopal Actors Guild.

Kimbrough died in Culver City, California, on January 11, 2023, at the age of 86.

== Filmography ==
=== Television ===
Year	Television	Role	Notes
1975–1976	Kojak	Rudy, A.D.A Greg Burton	3 episodes
1975–1983	Great Performances	Dr. Spiga, Benton Arrelsford, Editor	3 episodes
1981	For Ladies Only	Bob Merlis	Television film
1985	Tales of the Unexpected	Eric	Episode: "Scrimshaw"
1986–1988	Spenser: For Hire	Louis Groton, Roger Thornwood	2 episodes
1986	Another World	Dr. Abbott	Unknown episodes
1988–1998, 2018	Murphy Brown	Jim Dial	250 episodes Nominated—Primetime Emmy Award for Outstanding Supporting Actor in a Comedy Series; Nominated—Screen Actors Guild Award for Outstanding Performance by an Ensemble in a Comedy Series
1988	Hothouse	Mr. Austen	Episode: "Nancy: Part 1"
1992	Dinosaurs	Dr. Ficus	Episode: "Germ Warfare"
1994	Mighty Max	Dr. Bob	Voice, episode: "Scorpio Rising"
1998	Pinky and the Brain	Sandy Dreckman	Voice, episode: "You'll Never Eat Food Pellets in This Town Again!"
1998	Hercules	Cletus	Voice, episode: "Hercules and the Pegasus Incident"
1998	Love Boat: The Next Wave	Rich	Episode: "Affairs to Remember"
2000	Family Guy	Jim Dial	Voice, episode: "A Picture Is Worth $1,000 Bucks"
2000	The Angry Beavers	Narrator	Voice, episode: "Canucks Amuck"
2000	Batman Beyond	Stage Gordon	Voice, episode: "Out of the Past"
2002	Ally McBeal	Charlie Fish	Episode: "What I'll Never Do for Love Again"
2002	The Zeta Project	Pat Jensen	Voice, episode: "On the Wire"

=== Film ===
Year	Film	Role	Notes
1976	The Front	Committee counselor	
1977	The Sentinel	Hospital doctor	Uncredited
1979	The Seduction of Joe Tynan	Francis	
1979	Starting Over	Salesman	
1980	It's My Turn	Jerome	
1987	Switching Channels	Governor Springfield	
1988	The Good Mother	Uncle Orrie	
1995	Whisper of the Heart	Additional voices	2006 Disney dub
1996	The Hunchback of Notre Dame	Victor	Voice
2000	Buzz Lightyear of Star Command: The Adventure Begins	Brain Pod #29	Voice
2000	The Land Before Time VII: The Stone of Cold Fire	Rainbow Face #1	Voice
2001	The Wedding Planner	Mr. Donolly	
2001	Recess: School's Out	Mort Chalk	Voice
2002	The Hunchback of Notre Dame II	Victor	Voice
2003	Marci X	Lane Strayfield	

=== Video games ===
Year	Title	Role
1996	Disney's Animated Storybook: The Hunchback of Notre Dame	Victor
1996	The Hunchback of Notre Dame: Topsy Turvy Games	Victor
2012	Kingdom Hearts 3D: Dream Drop Distance	Victor
2017	Kingdom Hearts HD 2.8 Final Chapter Prologue	Victor
