= The Undersea Adventures of Captain Nemo =

- Created by: Jean Mathieson; Al Guest (based on a character created by Jules Verne)
- Written by: John Sone; Richard Oleksiak; Jean Mathieson; Al Guest; Dave Cox; Don Gillis
- Directed by: Jean Mathieson; Al Guest
- Voices of: Len Carlson; Billie Mae Richards
- Country of origin: Canada
- Original language: English
- No. of seasons: 1
- No. of episodes: 78

Production
- Producers: Jean Mathieson; Al Guest
- Camera setup: Kim Barnard; Dave Pauloff
- Running time: 5 minutes
- Production company: Rainbow Animation

Original release
- Network: CBC (Canada); CBS (United States)
- Release: 1975

The Undersea Adventures of Captain Nemo is a Canadian animated television series of five-minute cartoons produced in 1975 by Rainbow Animation in Toronto, Ontario. The series follows the underwater adventures of Captain Mark Nemo and his two young assistants, Christine and Robbie, in their nuclear-powered submarine, the Nautilus.

== Background ==
In the fall of 1975, children in the United States and Canada were introduced to the animated series The Undersea Adventures of Captain Nemo. In America, Captain Nemo was introduced as part of the long-running children's program Captain Kangaroo on CBS. In Canada, one five-minute Captain Nemo cartoon was shown during each episode of Peanuts and Popcorn on CBC Television. The series ran in Quebec as Capitaine Marc Simon. The series was the first and only Canadian created and fully Canadian animated series to run on a major American network - CBS.

Created by Jean Mathieson & Al Guest, who were also the producers and directors as well as writers, it was produced by their studio, Rainbow Animation of Toronto, Ontario, Canada. The Undersea Adventures of Captain Nemo was a fanciful re-imagining of the original Jules Verne character Captain Nemo, from his 1870 novel Twenty Thousand Leagues Under the Seas.

This time, Nemo was depicted as an ocean researcher named Mark Nemo. Blond and hunky, Mark travelled the world's oceans doing scientific research, providing assistance to both humans and animals and thwarting evildoers. Along for the ride were two kids, Christine and Robbie, who learned (along with the viewers) about life beneath the sea as they went.

These cartoons were quite short, exactly five minutes in length (30 seconds of which was the opening). Besides being educational, these cartoons are an insight into some of the philosophy around children's education of the mid-1970s. Each episode would attempt to convey some information about oceanography or marine biology, and all of the plot lines would be resolved cleanly in five minutes without resorting to much violence.

At times, Captain Nemo reflects the influence of the 1970s environmental movement, but the sometimes serious attempts to convey environmentalist themes are softened by its lighthearted style.

== Voice cast ==
- Len Carlson ... Captain Mark Nemo / Dr. Neptune MacPherson
- Billie Mae Richards ... Christine / Robbie

== Episodes ==
Airdates for the episodes are unknown, nor is this a confirmed airing order. The following are the synopses Magic Shadows Inc. provides in the syndication package for Captain Nemo:

1. Rescue of a Killer: Nemo and crew save a killer whale trapped under a cable.
2. Battle of the Giants: Chris and Robbie accidentally become involved in a battle between a giant squid and a sperm whale.
3. Poachers of the Deep: The Nautilus intervenes to save a pod of humpback whales from brutal poachers.
4. Jaws of Death: A shark menaces a lost baby blue whale.
5. Monsters on the Beach: The Nautilus must act quickly to keep a pod of pilot whales from beaching themselves.
6. The Invisible Girl: Chris is forced to pioneer a new shark repellent device.
7. Deadly Ribbons: Eels become a danger to the Nautilus when it accidentally intrudes on their breeding grounds.
8. The Floating Peril: The crew of the Nautilus explore the strange life in the Sargasso Sea.
9. Guess What's Coming For Dinner: Nemo rescues Robbie when an experiment with sharks gets out of hand.
10. Killer from the Past: The Nautilus faces a dangerous World War II magnetic mine.
11. The Golden Trap: The Nautilus finds sunken treasure, but it is guarded by vicious moray eels.
12. The Floating Gold Mine: An experimental sea-gold refining ship is attacked by pirates.
13. The Tuna Trapper: An ingenious but illegal way to harvest fish is foiled by the crew of the Nautilus.
14. The Fish Bomber: A wealthy collector who illegally bombs fish to add to his collection has the tables turned on him.
15. The Devil's Doorway: The Nautilus is trapped by an undersea volcano.
16. The Coral Maze: The Nautilus is lost in an underwater labyrinth.
17. The Mine at the Bottom of the Sea: Mining manganese nodules becomes hazardous when the kids' mini-sub becomes disabled.
18. Wild Water and Oil: An oil rig's submersible repair craft is trapped under the rig during a storm.
19. The Silver Sea: Observing the chaos of the food chain from an open boat becomes dangerous.
20. The Ice Menagerie: On a snowmobile exploration of the Arctic, the crew of the Nautilus must race a polar bear to reach safety.
21. Behind Bars: The Nautilus saves an injured dolphin from a ravenous pack of sharks.
22. Shark Patrol: Specially trained dolphins guarding a bathing beach fight off sharks.
23. Dolphin Express: Only a dolphin can get to the surface and back with support gear fast enough to save a diver.
24. Collision at Sea: The Nautilus becomes a life jacket for an injured whale.
25. Eyes of the Deep: The crew of the Nautilus investigates the monsters that live in the deeper parts of the sea.
26. The Bloodhound of the Sea: During an experiment, Robbie has to ward off a hungry hammerhead shark with his bare hands.
27. The Arab Solution: Trapped in treacherous coral reefs with an monsoon approaching, Robbie and Chris have to think quickly to save the Nautilus.
28. The Undersea Looters: A search for ghosts leads to the ruins of Carthage.
29. Shadow of Death: A leopard seal stalks the crew of the Nautilus under the ice.
30. The Pearl Snatchers: Mysterious thefts of cultured pearls at an oyster farm.
31. Circle of Fire: Lava from a volcano menaces an Icelandic village and only the Nautilus stands in its path.
32. Rapture of the Deep: Robbie goes after a coelacanth and develops nitrogen narcosis when he goes too deep.
33. Fish Farm: The Nautilus investigates a case of deliberate pollution and encounters the largest shark in the world.
34. Cool It, Captain: An emergency forces the Nautilus to hijack an iceberg.
35. The Little Island: What is the secret of the ancient gold coins found by the islanders?
36. Mystery Island: The Nautilus plans to sink an island.
37. All That Glitters: The Nautilus tries to recover a cargo of valuable medicine from a sunken ship full of explosives.
38. Queen of the Deep: A mysterious force pulls Chris helplessly into a cave full of sharks.
39. Don't Raise the Bridge, Lower the River: A diver is pinned under a container that holds radioactive materials.
40. The Big Prize: The crew of the Nautilus is honored by the Save the Whales foundation.
41. Go Fetch, Killer: Trained killer whales display their abilities.
42. Dangerous Welcome: A giant squid menaces the recovery of a group of astronauts.
43. Mystery Triangle: The Nautilus investigates the Bermuda Triangle.
44. The Meteorite Shower: Mating sea snakes complicate the retrieval of a meteorite.
45. Snake Charmer: Chris attracts a deadly admirer.
46. Haul Away Joe: A valuable research submarine disappears.
47. See Through Killer: Robbie has an encounter with a fatal sea wasp.
48. The Shark Catalog: The Nautilus takes a look at some of the strangest sharks in the world.
49. The Blue Hole: A small plane goes down in a lake in the middle of the ocean.
50. Undersea Flyer: Mark, Chris and Robbie save a rare leatherback sea turtle.
51. The Five-Armed Thief: A plague of starfish descend on an oyster bed.
52. The Greatest Predator: The crew of the Nautilus sees the results of man's effect on his environment.
53. Getting Ahead: While testing new thermal diving suits in the Arctic, Robbie and Chris lose their way under the ice.
54. Everybody Does It: Why is Mark sending the Nautilus on a collision course with an island?
55. When Right is Wrong: Poachers hunting protected right whales are pursued by the Nautilus.
56. The Invisible Wave: The hunter becomes the hunted when the Nautilus, trapped in an underwater landfall, is at the mercy of desperate diamond thieves.
57. Earthquake Hunters: It is a bad time for Robbie's radio to break down when he gets his foot caught in a giant clam.
58. The Cloud Under the Sea: The Nautilus creates its own whirlpool to save a kelp farm.
59. The Haunted Habitat: Mark, Robbie and Chris turn into ghost hunters at a haunted sea lab.
60. Saved by a Whisker: Help comes from an unexpected source when the crew of the Nautilus is menaced by walruses.
61. When You've Got to Glow: Teenagers swimming near a nuclear power plant develop a strange glow.
62. Hawksbill Hero: Mark makes his acting debut to save the hawksbill sea turtle.
63. Charlie to the Rescue: Tables are turned when Chris is saved by a dolphin.
64. The Penguins of Paradise Harbor: Leopard seals are menacing a colony of penguins.
65. The Mermaid of Key West: Robbie and Chris look for mermaids off the Florida Keys.
66. Flight from the Swordfish: A swordfish attacks the mini-sub with Chris and Robbie inside.
67. Heads or Tails: The crew of the Nautilus discover the world's only bulletproof fish.
68. The Loch Ness Monster: Robbie is sure he and Chris have found the Loch Ness Monster.
69. The Sunken Fleet of Truk Lagoon: Danger still lurks in the graveyard of World War II ships.
70. Undersea Hitch-hiker: A study of the remora takes the Nautilus into the middle of a school of sharks.
71. Sitting on a Fortune: The crew of the Nautilus discovers treasure worth millions of dollars.
72. The Ice Trap: A fleet of whaling ships find themselves mysteriously sealed up in the middle of an iceberg.
73. Turtle Farm: The crew of the Nautilus discover a plan to save sea turtles.
74. Now You See It, Now You Don't: Things are seldom what they seem to be under the ocean.
75. The Yellow Flood: Millions of venomous sea snakes are sighted off the coast of a Jamaican resort.
76. The Tunas of Taranto: Robbie is almost taken for a tuna when he stumbles into some fishing nets.
77. The Hidden World: Mark shows Chris and Robbie the secrets of hidden marine life.
78. The Green Ghost: Mysterious holograms from the Nautilus save a new generation of the green sea turtle.

== DVD releases ==
Digiview Entertainment has released a total of 48 episodes on DVD in a series of four volumes. Digiview Entertainment's releases are found in thin-cases and made available through Walmart and Amazon.com where each DVD, containing 12 episodes per volume, retailed for $1.00 a piece.

- Monsters on the Beach (Volume 1): Rescue of a Killer, Battle of the Giants, Poachers of the Deep, Jaws of Death, Monsters on the Beach, The Invisible Girl, Deadly Ribbons, The Floating Peril, Guess What's Coming For Dinner, Killer from the Past, The Golden Trap, The Floating Gold Mine
- The Coral Maze (Volume 2): The Tuna Trapper, The Fish Bomber, The Devil's Doorway, The Coral Maze, The Mine at the Bottom of the Sea, Wild Water and Oil, The Silver Sea, The Ice Menagerie, Behind Bars, Shark Patrol, Dolphin Express, Collision at Sea
- Mystery Island (Volume 3): Eyes of the Deep, The Bloodhound of the Sea, The Arab Solution, The Undersea Looters, Shadow of Death, The Pearl Snatchers, Circle of Fire, Rapture of the Deep, Fish Farm, Cool It Captain, The Little Island, Mystery Island
- Dangerous Welcome (Volume 4): All That Glitters, Queen of the Deep, Don't Raise the Bridge Lower the River, The Big Prize, Go Fetch Killer, Dangerous Welcome, Mystery Triangle, The Meteorite Shower, Snake Charmer, Haul Away Joe, See Through Killer, The Shark Catalog

== See also ==
- List of underwater science fiction works
