= Where Do Teenagers Come From? =

- ABC Afterschool Special episode
- Episode no.: Season 8 Episode 6
- Original air date: March 5, 1980

"Where Do Teenagers Come From?" is a 1980 episode of the American television anthology series ABC Afterschool Special, which aired on March 5, 1980. The live action-animation episode was produced by DePatie-Freleng Enterprises and was a sequel to the 1977 episode My Mom's Having a Baby. The episode was notable for its signature song "Growing Up", written by Doug Goodwin.

== Premise ==
When 12-year-old Kelly begins to experience changes in her body, she, along with Petey and Oscar, once again visit Dr. Lendon Smith, who uses an animated film that explains in detail (via Smith's narraration) of how teenagers, especially young girls, experience adolescence and how her body changes.

== Cast ==
- Shane Sinutko as Petey Evans
- Jarred Johnson as Oscar
- Rachael Longaker as Kelly Driscoll
- Lendon Smith as himself
- Stephanie Steele as Julie Driscoll
