= Positive: A Journey Into AIDS =

- ABC Afterschool Special episode
- Episode no.: Season 24; Episode 2
- Directed by: Eamon Harrington; John Watkin
- Original air date: December 7, 1995

"Positive: A Journey Into AIDS" is a 1995 episode of the American television anthology series ABC Afterschool Special, directed by Eamon Harrington and John Watkin. It was produced for the ABC Afterschool Special series. It followed actors Michael Sutton and Kimberly McCullough, who played Stone Cates and Robin Scorpio, respectively, as they researched HIV and AIDS for their roles as HIV+ teenagers on the long-running ABC daytime serial General Hospital.

== Cast ==
- Francesca James, Executive Producer, General Hospital
- Kimberly McCullough
- Dr. Steven Miles, President, UCLA School of Medicine
- Michael Sutton

== Awards ==
1996 Daytime Emmy Awards (2 Wins)

- Outstanding Achievement in Single Camera Editing: Nina Gilberti
- Outstanding Directing in a Children's Special: John Watkin & Eamon Harrington
