= Beth Howland =

American actress (1941–2015)

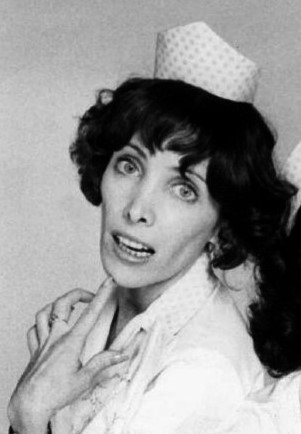
- Howland as Vera in Alice (1976)
- Born: Elizabeth Howland; May 28, 1941; Brighton, Massachusetts, U.S.
- Died: December 31, 2015 (aged 74); Santa Monica, California, U.S.
- Occupation: Actress
- Years active: 1959–2002
- Known for: Alice; Company
- Spouses: Michael J. Pollard (m. 1961; div. 1969) Charles Kimbrough (m. 2002)
- Children: 1

Elizabeth Howland (May 28, 1941 – December 31, 2015) was an American actress known for her work on stage and television. She was best known for playing waitress Vera Gorman in the sitcom Alice.

Howland originated the role of Amy in the original Broadway cast of Stephen Sondheim's Company, where she introduced the patter song "Getting Married Today".

== Life and career ==
=== Early years ===
Howland was born on May 28, 1941, in Brighton, Massachusetts. At the age of 16, she left home to follow a dancer friend to New York City. After some time of auditioning, Howland made her Broadway debut in 1959 as Lady Beth in the musical Once Upon a Mattress, which transferred from Off-Broadway. She went on to have roles in the musicals Bye Bye Birdie, High Spirits, Drat! The Cat!, and Darling of the Day.

=== Career ===
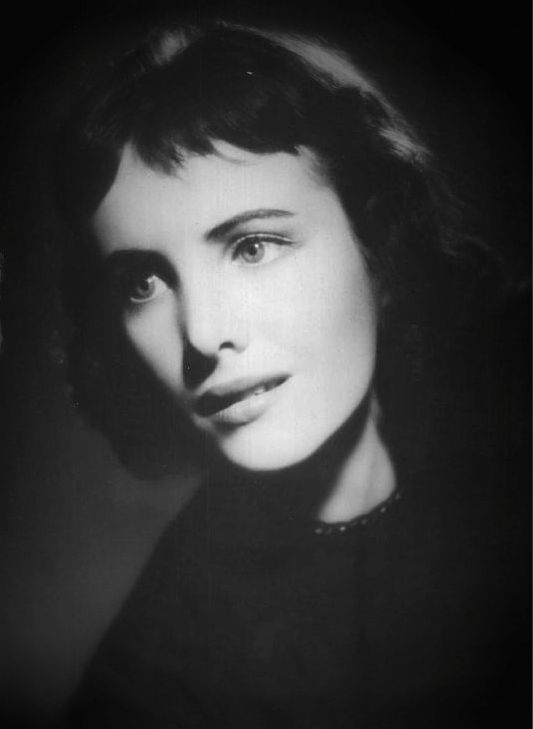
Howland in Li'l Abner (1959)

Howland can be seen dancing and singing in the chorus of the movie Li'l Abner (1959) as Clem's wife, alongside future television star Valerie Harper. After appearing in Company, she left New York to relocate to California, where she made guest appearances on television series such as Love, American Style, Cannon, The Mary Tyler Moore Show, Little House on the Prairie, Eight Is Enough, and The Love Boat. For her work on Alice, Howland received four Golden Globe Award nominations. She later took on numerous telefilm roles, including You Can't Take It with You (as Essie) and A Caribbean Mystery.

She remained on Alice throughout its nine seasons. After the sitcom ended in 1985, Howland went into semi-retirement. She made occasional guest appearances in shows including Murder, She Wrote, Chicken Soup for the Soul, Sabrina the Teenage Witch, and The Tick. She also starred in the ABC Afterschool Special, "Terrible Things My Mother Told Me".

=== Personal life ===
From 1961 to 1969, Howland was married to actor Michael J. Pollard, with whom she had a daughter.

In 2002, she wed actor Charles Kimbrough and remained married to him until her death in 2015. Kimbrough and Howland had appeared together in Company.

Howland was an Episcopalian and served as president of the Episcopal Actors Guild from 2005 to 2008.

=== Death ===
Howland died of lung cancer on December 31, 2015, at the age of 74. Per her request, her death was not reported to the media until May 24, 2016.

== Filmography ==
=== Film and Television ===
Year	Title	Role	Notes
1959	Li'l Abner	Clem's wife	Uncredited; Musical film based on the comic strip of the same name, created by Al Capp, and the successful Broadway musical of the same name that opened in 1956. The film was produced by Norman Panama and directed by Melvin Frank.
1970	Original Cast Album: Company	Herself / Amy	Documentary film by D. A. Pennebaker, observing the marathon recording session to create the original cast album for the Stephen Sondheim musical Company.
1972	The Mary Tyler Moore Show	Linda Foster	Episode: "Have I Found a Guy for You" (S 3:Ep 10)
1973	The Ted Bessell Show	Margaret	Made-for-TV movie directed by Bill Persky.
1973	Love, American Style	Rita	Episode: "Love and Carmen Lopez/Love and the Cover/Love and the Cryin' Cowboy" (S 5:Ep 13)
1974	Thunderbolt and Lightfoot	Vault Manager's Wife	Uncredited; Crime film written and directed by Michael Cimino.
1975	Cannon	Secretary	Episode: "Nightmare" (S 5:Ep 1)
1975	The Rookies	Mrs. Ross	Episode: "Reading, Writing and Angel Dust" (S 4:Ep 2)
1975	Bronk	June Kramer	Episode: "Echo of Danger" (S 1:Ep 4)
1975	The Mary Tyler Moore Show	Joan	Episode: "Mary Richards Falls in Love" (S 6:Ep 11)
1976	Little House on the Prairie	Clerk	Episode: "The Pride of Walnut Grove" (S 2:Ep 14)
1976–85	Alice	Vera Louise Gorman Novak	Contract role (202 episodes)
1977	Eight Is Enough	Mavis	Episode: "Is There a Doctor in the House?" (S 2:Ep 1)
1979	The Love Boat	Lee Noble	Episode: "Third Wheel/Grandmother's Day/Second String Mom" (S 2:Ep 27)
1979	You Can't Take It with You	Essie Carmichael	Made-for-TV movie directed by Paul Bogart.
1980	The Wild Wacky Wonderful World of Winter	Stripper	Made-for-TV movie
1981	The Love Boat	Eloise Farnsworth	Episodes: "Farnsworth's Fling/Three in a Bed/I Remember Helen/Merrill, Melanie & Melanesia/Gopher Farnsworth Smith: Part 1" (S 5:Ep 8); "Farnsworth's Fling/Three in a Bed/I Remember Helen/Merrill, Melanie & Melanesia/Gopher Farnsworth Smith: Part 2" (S 5:Ep 9)
1982	American Playhouse	Housewife	Episode: "Working" (S 1:Ep 14)
1983	The Love Boat	Jeannie Davis	Episodes: "Hits and Missus/Return of Annabelle/Just Plain Folks Medicine/Caught in the Act/The Real Thing/Do Not Disturb/Lulu & Kenny (Country Music Jamboree): Part 1" (S 6:Ep 27); "Hits and Missus/Return of Annabelle/Just Plain Folks Medicine/Caught in the Act/The Real Thing/Do Not Disturb/Lulu & Kenny (Country Music Jamboree): Part 2" (S 6:Ep 28)
1983	The Love Boat	Captain Bernice Tobin	Episode: "Youth Takes a Holiday/Don't Leave Home Without It/Prisoner of Love" (S 7:Ep 4)
1983	A Caribbean Mystery	Evelyn Hillingdon	Made-for-TV movie directed by Robert Michael Lewis.
1985	Comedy Factory	Kate Weston	Episode: "It Takes Two" (S 1:Ep 6)
1988	ABC Afterschool Special	Eleanor Flemming	Episode: "Terrible Things My Mother Told Me" (S 16:Ep 5)
1988	You Can't Take It with You	Anita Briggs	Episode: "For Whom the Phone Rings" (S 1:Ep 14)
1993	Murder, She Wrote	Sandy Oates	Episode: "Lone Witness" (S 9:Ep 19)
1997	Sabrina the Teenage Witch	Mrs. Ericson	Episode: "Cat Showdown" (S 1:Ep 19)
2000	Chicken Soup for the Soul	Diane	Episode: "Thinking of You/Mama's Soup Pot/The Letter" (S 1:Ep 17)
2000	Batman Beyond	Singer (voice)	Episode: "Out of the Past" (S 3:Ep 5)
2002	The Tick	Bea	Episode: "Arthur, Interrupted" (S 1:Ep 8)
2002	As Told by Ginger	Dr. Leventhal (voice)	Episode: "And She Was Gone" (S 2:Ep 23)

=== Stage ===
Year	Title	Role	Notes
1958	Li'l Abner	Wife	Her Majesty's Theatre
1958	Li'l Abner	Wife	The Auditorium Theatre
1958	Li'l Abner	Wife	Grand Riviera Theater
1958	Li'l Abner	Wife	The Royal Alexandra Theatre
1959	Once Upon a Mattress	Lady Beth (Replacement)	Alvin Theatre, Broadway
1960	Bye Bye Birdie	Carol (Replacement)	Martin Beck Theatre, Broadway
1964	High Spirits	Beth	Alvin Theatre, Broadway
1965	Drat! The Cat!	Ensemble	Martin Beck Theatre, Broadway
1968	Darling of the Day	Roslaind	George Abbott Theatre, Broadway
1969	George M!	Ethel Levey	Paper Mill Playhouse
1970	Company	Amy	Alvin Theatre, Broadway
1971	Company	Amy	National Tour
1972	Company	Amy	Her Majesty's Theatre
1973	Sondheim: A Musical Tribute	Performer	Sam S. Shubert Theatre, Broadway
1987	She Loves Me	Ilona Ritter	Pasadena Civic Auditorium
