= Terrible Things My Mother Told Me =

- ABC Afterschool Special episode
- Episode no.: Season 16; Episode 5
- Directed by: Susan Rohrer
- Story by: John Alan Palmer; Susan Rohrer; Christopher Whitesell
- Teleplay by: Christopher Whitesell
- Original air date: January 20, 1988

"Terrible Things My Mother Told Me" is a 1988 episode of the American television anthology series ABC Afterschool Special, directed and produced by Susan Rohrer. It stars Beth Howland, Katherine Kamhi and Ian Ziering.

== Plot ==
Hard-working 16-year-old Julia does not realize that her mother Eleanor - who alternately harasses and ignores Julia, while doting on lazy younger daughter Katie - is being emotionally and verbally abusive. But when Julia is given the lead in a school play directed by popular Randy, she realizes she is every bit as worthy of Eleanor's support and encouragement as her pampered sister. Julia gets Eleanor to open up and find out where her anger comes from. Eleanor reveals she suffered the same abuse from her own mother and was scarred in particular by when she accidentally cracked a delicate plate and her mother's reaction to it. Eleanor smashes the plate realizing what has become of her. Julia replies, "Nice shot!" and they embrace.

== Cast ==
- Beth Howland as Eleanor Flemming
- Katherine Kamhi as Julia Flemming
- Ian Ziering as Randy Forrester
- Ita DeMarco as Katie Flemming
- Stephen James as Mr. Bacharan
- Carol Goodheart as Mary Forrester
- Stephanie Winters as Beth Sotheby

== Release ==
The film was premiered on January 20, 1988, on ABC as the fifth episode of the 16th season of ABC Afterschool Special.
