= Jeannette Eyerly =

American novelist (1908–2008)

- Born: Jeannette Hyde; June 7, 1908; Topeka, Kansas, U.S.
- Died: August 18, 2008 (aged 100)
- Education: University of Iowa
- Occupations: Writer; columnist
- Spouse: Frank Eyerly (m. 1932)
- Parent(s): Robert Cornelius Hyde; Mabel Jeannette Young
- Writing career
- Genre: Young adult fiction

Jeannette Eyerly (June 7, 1908 – August 18, 2008) was an American writer of young adult fiction for girls and a columnist. She was a pioneer in dealing with controversial topics in novels for young people. Among the themes that appeared in her books were teenage pregnancy, alcohol abuse, and drug use. She penned eighteen novels, starting with More Than a Summer Love in 1962, though she had published many short stories before that. Her 1977 novel, He's My Baby, Now was the basis for an ABC television movie. She also wrote two books of verse.

Born Jeannette Hyde in Topeka, Kansas to Robert Cornelius Hyde and Mabel Jeannette Young, she married Frank Eyerly in 1932. Eyerly earned a bachelor's degree in English from the University of Iowa in 1930. Her papers are archived at the University of Iowa.

== Bibliography ==
- More Than a Summer Love (1962)
- Drop-Out (1963)
- Gretchen's Hill (1965)
- A Girl Like Me (1966)
- The Girl Inside (1968)
- Escape from Nowhere (1969)
- Radigan Cares (1970)
- The Phaedra Complex (1971)
- Bonnie Jo, Go Home (1973)
- Good-Bye to Budapest (1974)
- The Leonardo Touch (1976)
- He's My Baby, Now (1977)
- See Dave Run (1978)
- If I Loved You Wednesday (1980)
- Seth and Me and Rebel Make Three (1983)
- Angel Baker, Thief (1984)
- The Seeing Summer (1984)
- Someone to Love Me (1987)
- Writing Young Adult Novels (1988)
- Alphabet Book for Adults (2000)
- Food for Thought (2003)

Jeannette Eyerly wrote 21 books or short stories.

== Awards ==
- Iowa Author Award from the Public Library of Des Moines Foundation, 2002.
- Iowa Women's Hall of Fame, 2006.
