= Mildred Ames =

American writer (1919–1994)

- Born: November 2, 1919; Bridgeport, CT
- Died: July 20, 1994 (aged 74); Los Angeles, CA
- Occupation: Children's author
- Writing career
- Language: English
- Genres: Fiction and science fiction
- Notable work: Anna to the Infinite Power

Mildred Ames (November 2, 1919 – July 20, 1994) was an American writer of children's literature, for older children, and some science fiction. Her science fiction works often concern issues of paranoia or questions of identity. One of her most famous teen novels in this genre, Anna to the Infinite Power (1981), was turned into a motion picture with the same name in 1982.

== Life ==
Ames was born in Bridgeport, CT, the daughter of Edward and Amelia (Miller) Walsh. She wrote her first story at the age of 9, described as a "tearful melodrama". Prior to writing professionally, Ames worked as a milliner, a sales person, and a telephone operator. She published her first novel, Shadows of Summers Past, in 1973.

== Selected works ==
- Grandpa Jake and the Grand Christmas — 1990
- Who Will Speak for the Lamb? — 1989
- Conjuring Summer In — 1986
- Cassandra-Jamie — 1985
- The Silver Link, the Silken Tie — 1984
- Philo Potts, or, The Helping Hand Strikes Again — 1982
- Anna to the Infinite Power — 1981
- The Dancing Madness — 1980
- Nicky and the Joyous Noise — 1980
- The Wonderful Box — 1978
- What are Friends For? — 1978
- Without Hats, Who Can Tell the Good Guys? — 1976
- Is There Life on a Plastic Planet? — 1975
- Shadows of Summers Past - 1973

== Adaptations ==
Anna to the Infinite Power was adapted as a film of the same name in 1982.
