= Cheryl Arutt =

American commercial, print, television, and film actress

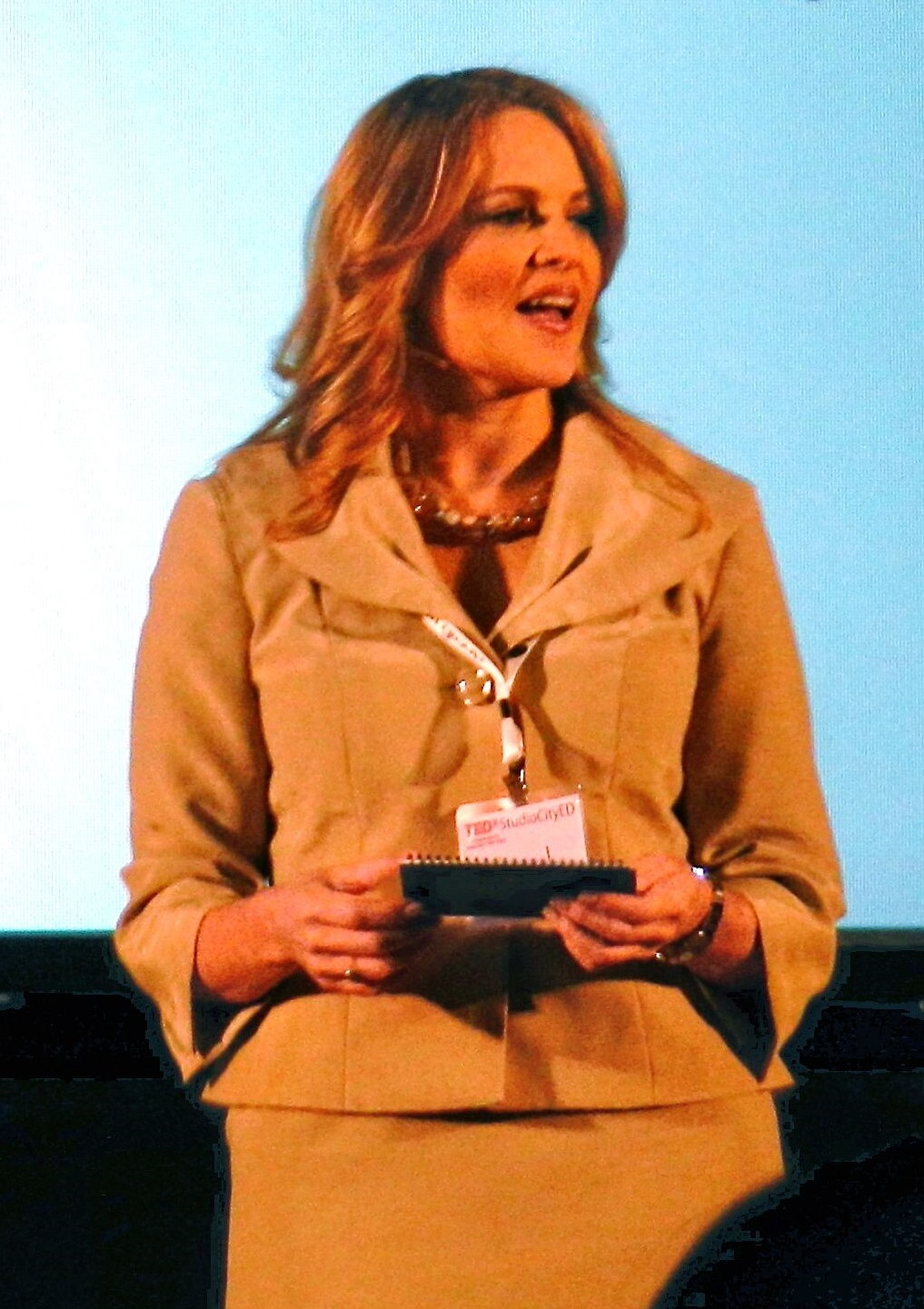
- Arutt giving a TEDx talk in 2012
- Born: May 13, 1966 (age 60)
- Occupations: Actress (retired); clinical and forensic psychologist
- Years active: Actress (1969–1991); Psychologist (1999–present)
- Website: drcherylarutt.com

Cheryl Arutt (born May 13, 1966) is an American commercial, print, television, and film actress and a clinical and forensic psychologist and media consultant. She co-hosts and is a regular member of the Behavior Bureau on HLN's panel show Dr. Drew On Call and appears as a psychological expert on ABC, the Fox News Channel, HLN and In Session.

== Actress ==
Arutt started her film and video acting career at age four. As a teen she was dubbed "queen of the After School Specials" by her peers for her numerous roles in TV movies of that genre. She was discovered at age two when the casting director at Ted Bates Advertising Agency in New York City noticed her and convinced her mother to send her photo to an agent. She was signed on the spot by Rosemary Brian at the Mary Ellen White Agency and first appeared on TV in a Sara Lee cake commercial at the age of three. Hundreds of commercials followed, as well as an appearance in A. R. Gurney's teleplay adaptation of John Cheever's short story, O Youth and Beauty, Arutt appeared in the soap operas: Secret Storm, Guiding Light, All My Children and As the World Turns. Modeling jobs included the cover of Seventeen magazine.

Arutt was nominated for a Youth in Film Award for her title role as an Amish girl in Bobby and Sarah in the Best Young Actress in a Family Film Made for TV category.

After moving to Los Angeles, Arutt appeared on Murder, She Wrote, Kay O'Brien, and Charles in Charge. She appeared as young Ory Palmer in the NBC/Disney two-hour Movie of the Week pilot Davy Crockett: Rainbow in the Thunder as Davy's love interest.

== Psychologist ==
After more than 20 years as an actress in New York and Hollywood, Arutt retired to become a doctor for creative artists. Arutt attended University of California, Los Angeles with scholarships from both Screen Actors Guild and the American Federation of Television and Radio Artists, where she graduated summa cum laude and was elected to Phi Beta Kappa. Following a Doctor of Psychology degree from California School of Professional Psychology, where she developed a program called "Healing Together" for couples recovering from posttraumatic stress disorder, she became a clinical and forensic psychologist specializing in working with creative artists, including actors, writers, directors, cinematographers, studio executives and other entertainment professionals. Arutt has appeared as an expert on television in local, national and international programs. Her thoughts about psychological issues have been featured on live television, in documentaries and as an expert commentator on truTV, Fox News, and HLN, and as a consultant on psychological issues to 60 Minutes (Australia). As a psychotherapist, Arutt has helped many creative artists learn to thrive and clear obstacles to their professional and personal success. She is currently in private practice in Beverly Hills and also works as an expert witness and media consultant.
