= Stella Pevsner =

American children's writer (1921–2020)

Stella Pevsner (October 4, 1921 — June 11, 2020) was an American author of children's books and works of young adult literature published since the late 1960s.

Pevsner published 18 books, including And You Give Me a Pain, Elaine, Cute is a Four-Letter Word, How Could You Do It, Diane?, and Sing For Your Father, Su Phan. She received the 1980 Carl Sandburg Award from the Friends of the Chicago Public Library for Cute is a Four-Letter Word. Pevsner continued to write into her 90s, with her last book in 2018 being dictated.

Pevsner was born in Lincoln, Illinois on October 4, 1921. She married Leo Pevsner in 1953 and they had four children. Pevsner died at her home in New Mexico on June 11, 2020.
