= Mark St. Germain =

American dramatist (born 1960)

Mark St. Germain (born 1960) is an American playwright, author, and film and television writer.

== Career ==
=== Plays ===
St. Germain has written Camping With Henry and Tom (Outer Critics Circle and Lucille Lortel Awards), Out of Gas on Lover's Leap, Forgiving Typhoid Mary (Time Magazine's "Year's Ten Best"), Ears on a Beatle, The God Committee, The Collyer Brothers at Home, The Gifts of the Magi (co-written with Randy Courts), The Book of the Dun Cow (co-written by Randy Courts), Johnny Pye and the Fool-Killer (winner of an AT&T "New Plays For The Nineties Award"), Jack's Holiday, the award-winning children's book Three Cups, and Stand By Your Man: The Tammy Wynette Story.

As a dramatist, St. Germain shows a strong preference for historical fiction.

His play Freud's Last Session premiered in the summer of 2009, at the Barrington Stage Company in Pittsfield, Massachusetts, and ran at the New World Stages in New York City. Freud's Last Session began its New York previews on July 9, 2010, and officially opened on July 22, 2010. In 2011, Freud's Last Session won the Best Play Award from the off-Broadway Alliance.

In 2011, St. Germain's play The Best of Enemies premiered at the Barrington Stage Company. Based on the nonfiction book of the same name by Osha Gray Davidson, the play dramatizes the relationship between C.P. Ellis (a local KKK leader) and Ann Atwater (a Black civil rights organizer) during a racially tense period in the desegregation of Durham, North Carolina schools.

Becoming Dr. Ruth, which reveals the little-known but remarkable history of German-born Karola Ruth Siegel, who fled the Nazis in the Kindertransport before joining the Haganah in Jerusalem as a sniper and scout, struggling as a single mother in America, and, ultimately, becoming known as American TV sex expert Dr. Ruth Westheimer. The one-woman play (originally titled Dr. Ruth, All the Way), directed by Julianne Boyd and set in 1997, opened off-Broadway at the Westside Theatre in 2013. Other actresses to portray the role include Debra Jo Rupp, Eileen DeSandre at Virginia Repertory Theatre, and, in 2021, actress Tovah Feldshuh.

Scott and Hem in the Garden of Allah, premiering in 2013, explores an evening at Los Angeles' notorious Garden of Allah apartments with F. Scott Fitzgerald and Ernest Hemingway.

In 2014, St. Germain premiered his eighth play, Dancing Lessons, at Barrington Stage Company. The play ran from January 6 to February 7, 2016, at Orlando Shakespeare Theater as part of their 2015–16 Signature Series. The show was produced at Florida Studio Theatre in Sarasota, Florida as a part of their 2014–2015 Mainstage Season. Florida Studio Theatre has partnered with St. Germain to workshop many of his works in progress.

Recent works include Eleanor, a one-person show about the most famous First Lady in the world, which premiered at Barrington Stage and starred Harriet Harris; Dad, an autobiographical play, which was presented at Great Barrington Public Theater in 2021; and Public Speaking 101, which premiered at the Great Barrington Public Theater in the summer of 2022.

His relationship with Barrington Stage—the regional theatre where nearly all of St. Germain's recent works have premiered—was memorialized in 2012 when the troupe's Stage 2 venue was renamed the St. Germain Stage.

=== Television and film ===
His television credits include The Cosby Show (writer/creative consultant), Crime & Punishment and The Wright Verdicts. He was also a script writer on the CBS Daytime serial As the World Turns. He co-wrote the screenplay for Carroll Ballard's Duma.

As a personal project, he directed and co-produced the documentary "My Dog: An Unconditional Love Story", featuring, among others, Richard Gere, Glenn Close, and Lynn Redgrave.

His 2009 play Freud's Last Session was adapted as a film in 2023.

=== Books ===
He has written Three Cups, a children's book, Walking Evil, a comedic memoir, and a thriller entitled The Mirror Man.

=== Awards and affiliations ===
St. Germain is an alumnus of New Dramatists, where he was given the Joe A. Callaway Award; a member of the Dramatists Guild, the Writers Guild of America East, and a Board Member of the Barrington Stage Company. He was awarded the "New Voices In American Theatre" award at the William Inge Theatre Festival.
