= Christopher Leggett =

American film producer

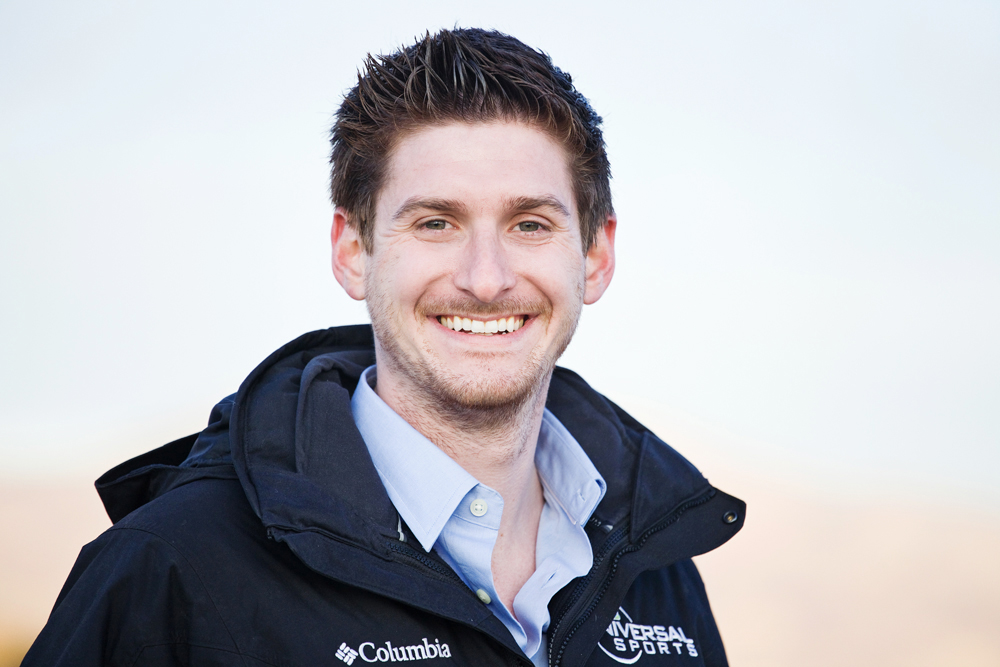
- Born: Wellesley, Massachusetts, USA
- Education: American University
- Notable work: "Fjögur píanó", The Short Game, Ask Dr. Ruth

Christopher Leggett is an American producer of films, television, documentaries, music videos, and commercials. In 2013, Leggett joined as a partner at Delirio Films, a boutique film and commercial production company with a focus on prestige documentary, both features and series. Leggett began his producing career at NBC / Universal Sports. Among his most recent documentaries is Ask Dr. Ruth, about sex therapist and Holocaust survivor Dr. Ruth Westheimer, which was shown at the Sundance Film Festival in 2019.

== Early life ==
Leggett was born in Wellesley, Massachusetts. He attended Wellesley High School, where he was a swimmer. He was recruited to swim at American University in Washington, DC, where he majored in Film & Media Arts.

Upon graduation, Chris lived in DC working as an editor for Eldeman, World Championship Sports Network, and HGTV. He relocated to Los Angeles in 2009.

== Television ==
Leggett's television background comes from his role as a producer at NBC Universal Sports where he covered both the 2010 and 2012 Olympic games. He also led the creation and production of Against the Tide, a docu-series featuring three Olympic athletes including Ed Moses on their quest for the London games. Leggett was later executive producer on a six-part documentary series, Hunting ISIS, which premiered in Spring 2018 on the History Channel and Viceland.

== Film ==
=== 2012-2015 ===
In 2012 he broke into the indie world with the Webby Award-winning music video for Icelandic band Sigur Rós directed by Alma Har'el and starring Shia LaBeouf. Later that year he produced a television pilot starring Elliott Gould, and a short film featuring Elijah Wood and Alia Shawkat, which premiered at the Tribeca Film Festival. Leggett then partnered with Academy Award winners John Battsek and David Frankel, Justin Timberlake, Jessica Biel and Emmy Award winner Josh Greenbaum for the 2013 SXSW Audience Award-winning documentary THE SHORT GAME, which followed the greatest 7-and-8 year-old golfers as they competed in the World Championships of Junior Golf. This film was picked up by Netflix as their first original title.

In 2015, Leggett partnered with executive producer and Academy Award winner John Legend to produce CAN YOU DIG THIS which won Grand Jury Prize at the 2015 LA Film Fest. The film is a portrait of four "gangster gardeners" pioneering the urban gardening movement in notoriously dangerous South Los Angeles. 2016 marked the return of the early collaboration by Leggett, Harel. and Labeouf for Harel’s sophomore feature film LOVETRUE, which premiered at the Tribeca Film Festival and won the jury award for Best Documentary at Karlovy Vary later that year.

=== 2016-present ===
In 2017, Delirio Films partnered with Hulu to launch its Original Feature Documentaries with Too Funny To Fail and Becoming Bond, which won the SXSW Audience award.

Since then, Leggett's first scripted film, Honey Boy, written by and starring Shia LaBeouf premiered alongside his documentaries Mike Wallace Is Here and Ask Dr. Ruth (about sex therapist and Holocaust survivor Dr. Ruth Westheimer) at Sundance Film Festival in 2019.

On Metacritic, Ask Dr. Ruth is assigned the film a score of 68 out of 100, based on 18 critics, indicating "Generally favorable reviews". Maureen Lee Lenker of Entertainment Weekly wrote, "this [Ask Dr. Ruth] film is a compelling, stirring testament to that fact even if it offers up less insight about what makes her tick from the woman herself than one might crave". Justin Chang of the Los Angeles Times wrote, "The director Ryan White ("The Keepers") has fun exploring all that gimmicky pop-cultural detritus, and he also drops in a few greatest-hits montages covering Westheimer's rise to fame, including her interviews with Arsenio Hall and Conan O'Brien, who seem alternately delighted and alarmed by her uninhibited sex talk". Daniel Fienberg of The Hollywood Reporter wrote, "America's favorite diminutive sex therapist gets a crowd-pleasing documentary treatment that traces her life from Holocaust survivor to beloved media figure".

Leggett co-produced the 2024 road trip documentary Will & Harper which features actor Will Ferrell and writer Harper Steele.

== Music videos ==
- Sigur Rós - "Fjögur píanó" (2012)

== Awards and accolades ==
- Winner, Audience Award - South by Southwest Film Festival - Becoming Bond (2017)
- Winner, Documentary prize - Karlovy Vary Film Festival - LoveTrue (2016)
- Winner, Audience Award - South by Southwest Film Festival - The Short Game (2013)

== Filmography ==
- Will & Harper (2024)
- Honey Boy (2019)
- Ask Dr. Ruth (2019)
- Mike Wallace Is Here (2019)
- Too Funny To Fail (2017)
- Becoming Bond (2016)
- LoveTrue (2016)
- Can You Dig This (2015)
- Flock of Dudes (2015) [co-producer]
- The Short Game (TV Series documentary) (2014)
- The Short Game (2013)
- Sigur Rós: Fjögur píanó (2012)
- Against the Tide(TV Series documentary) (2011)
