= Nissan Rilov =

Israeli artist

- ניסן רילוב
- Born: July 19, 1919; Kherson, Ukraine
- Died: March 10, 2007 (aged 87); Paris, France
- Occupation: Artist

Nissan Rilov (Hebrew: ניסן רילוב, Ukrainian: Ніссан Рилов; July 19, 1919 - March 10, 2007) was an Israeli artist. Prior to undertaking his artistic career, he served in paramilitary and military groups such as the Special Night Squads (SNS), the Haganah, and the British Army during World War II. Rilov became disenchanted with Zionism after a series of experiences that culminated in his refusal to obey an order to shoot an elderly man and his expulsion from the Haganah. He went on to study painting in Israel before emigrating to Paris, where he created art, founded an arts centre, and was active in supporting the Palestinian struggle for independence.

== Early life ==
Rilov was born in Kherson in southern Ukraine in 1919. His parents decided to leave the Soviet Union in 1924, initially living in Bessarabia and eventually arriving in Palestine in 1928. According to his friend Akiva Orr, Rilov was one of the few children to live in Nahalal, the first Zionist moshav in Palestine which had been established in 1922. There Moshe Dayan would become his childhood friend. Later, Rilov developed a close friendship with the Israeli poet, Hana Senesh, who had been a student at the Agricultural College for Girls in Nahalal.

== Military career ==
During the 1936–1939 Arab revolt in Palestine against British rule, Rilov joined the Special Night Squads (SNS) led by British Army officer Charles Orde Wingate and he witnessed acts of cruelty towards Palestinian villagers. He went on to join the Haganah, the Jewish pre-state militia. However, he became disillusioned after a Haganah commander ordered him to shoot an elderly peasant from the village of Ma'alul, who had returned to the lands he once cultivated that had been sold to Nahalal by absentee Arab owners. Rilov refused, saying: "I don't shoot old people." Shunned by his family and friends after he was court-martialled and expelled from the Haganah for disobeying orders, Rilov left Nahalal for Tel Aviv where he joined the Palestine Communist Party. During World War II, he joined and fought for the British Army

== Artistic career ==
After the war's end, he returned to Tel Aviv study painting at the Avni Institute of Art and Design, and then apprenticed with the painter Avigdor Stematsky. After emigrating to Paris in the early 1950s, he studied at the Académie de la Grande Chaumière and supported himself by working as a builder. He met with great success in Paris after developing a collage technique which used torn pieces of painted sheets.

In 2002, Rilov and his son Kostya established the Lumières artistic society in Leuze, Morsains. The association holds a Nissan Rilov theatre festival every year, in honour of Rilov; the 2011 festival was also dedicated to the memory of Juliano Mer-Khamis.

== Support for Palestinians ==
In a 1984 France 3 documentary on the 1948 Arab-Israeli war, Rilov described how he also helped in the expulsion of local Palestinians as early as 1936:

"In one day, in order to start building [our homes] on this land, with bulldozers that existed then, primitive bulldozers unlike the ones that exist now, and with tractors, we destroyed the villages and kicked out all the Arabs out, and I remember something that has always struck me. It was how the children and the women threw themselves in front of the tractors and refused to leave. There was a strong resistance of the Palestinians against the destruction of their villages, and that had really touched me."

During the First Intifada, Rilov honoured the Palestinian peasant women who had thrown stones during the uprising by staging his exhibition, Stones. He then worked for three months at a school for Palestinian children in Jenin teaching them art and later helping to organize a 1995 exhibition of their work in Paris.
