= One Woman or Two =

1985 film by Daniel Vigne

- Theatrical release poster
- French: Une femme ou deux
- Directed by: Daniel Vigne
- Screenplay by: Daniel Vigne; Élisabeth Rappeneau
- Story by: Daniel Vigne
- Produced by: René Cleitman
- Starring: Gérard Depardieu; Sigourney Weaver; Ruth Westheimer; Michel Aumont
- Cinematography: Carlo Varini
- Edited by: Marie-Josèphe Yoyotte
- Music by: Kevin Mulligan; Evert Verhees; Toots Thielemans
- Production companies: Hachette Première; FR3 Films Production; DD Productions
- Distributed by: Acteurs Auteurs Associés
- Release date: 6 November 1985
- Running time: 97 minutes
- Country: France
- Language: French
- Budget: 30 million French francs ($3 million)

One Woman or Two (French: Une femme ou deux) is a 1985 French screwball romantic comedy film directed by Daniel Vigne, who co-wrote the screenplay with Élisabeth Rappeneau. It stars Gérard Depardieu, Sigourney Weaver, Ruth Westheimer and Michel Aumont.

The film is a rework of the 1938 American screwball comedy Bringing Up Baby, starring Katharine Hepburn and Cary Grant.

== Plot ==
Shy paleontologist/archaeologist (Gérard Depardieu) makes an archeological find of the fossil remains of the first, two-million-year-old, French woman, whom he calls Laura. He is approached and conned by a crass and greedy American model and Madison Avenue advertising executive (Sigourney Weaver), masquerading as a charity organisation executive in order to use the woman for her own perfume advertising campaign.

Later the real charity organization executive, ditzy rich American patroness of the sciences (Ruth Westheimer, in her feature film debut) turns up.

== Cast ==
- Gérard Depardieu as Julien Chayssac
- Sigourney Weaver as Jessica Fitzgerald
- Ruth Westheimer as Mrs. Heffner
- Michel Aumont as Pierre Carrière
- Zabou Breitman as Constance Michaux
- Tannis Vallely as Zoé

Most of the dialogue in the film is in French, including that of Weaver (an American) and Westheimer (originally from Germany). This would not have been difficult for Westheimer, who had lived in Switzerland and France and had studied and taught at the Sorbonne in the 1950s.

== Production ==
The film was shot in France (much of it in Paris) and New York City. French paleontologist Yves Coppens advised on the film. Scenes were also shot in Sisteron, in the Alpes-de-Haute-Provence department.

== Reception ==
The film was unsuccessful at the French box-office.

Chicago Sun-Times reviewer Roger Ebert wrote of this film in a half star review, "Add it all up, and what you've got here is a waste of good electricity. I'm not talking about the electricity between the actors. I'm talking about the current to the projector." In 2005 he included it on his most-hated films list.

Richard Harrington, writing for The Washington Post said: "it's funny enough, and genial in the way French comedy tends to be."
