= Joel Westheimer =

American-born academic

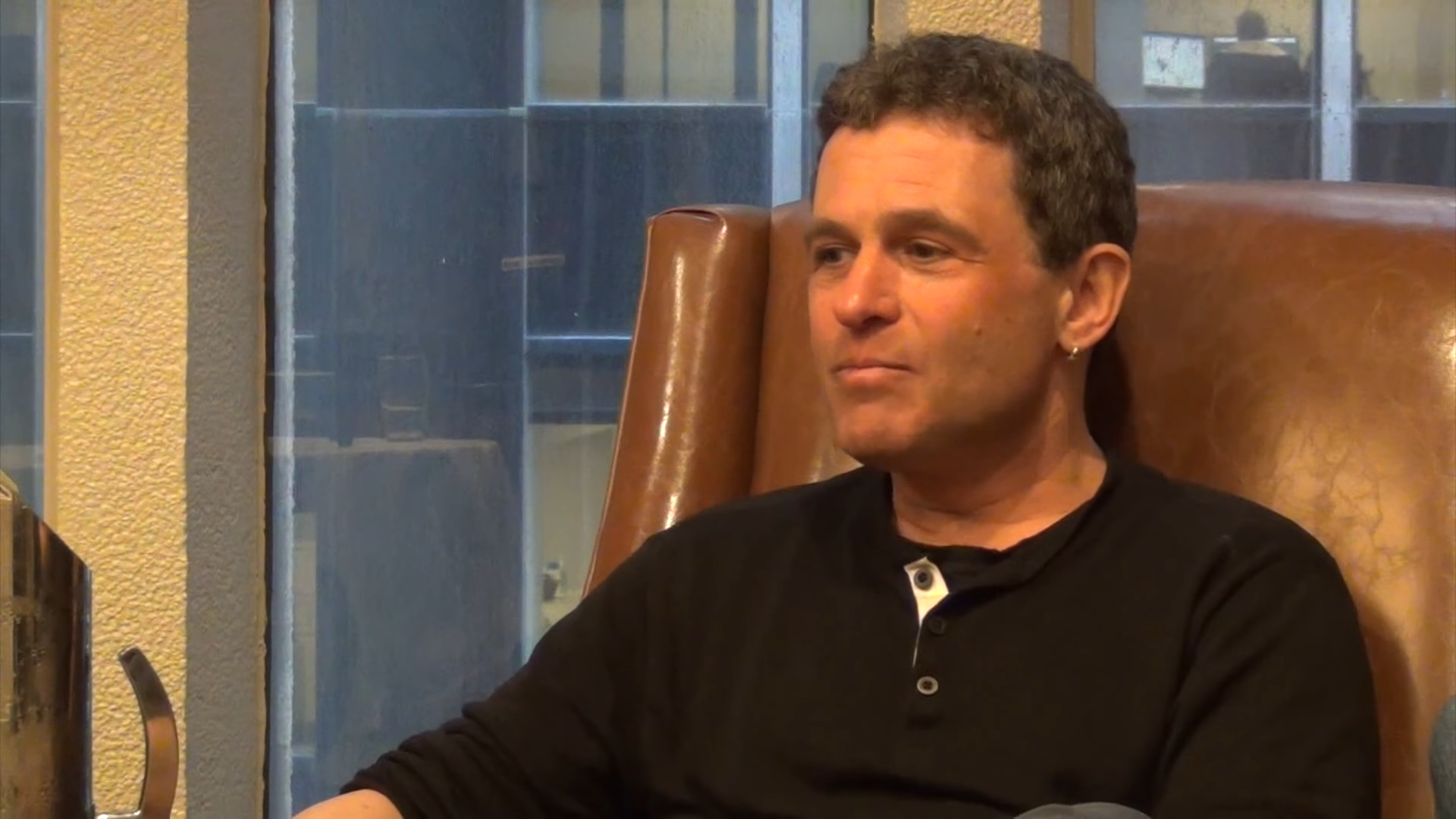
- Westheimer in 2018
- Born: March 24, 1963 (age 63); New York City, New York, U.S.
- Mother: Ruth Westheimer

Academic background
- Education: Princeton University (BS); Stanford University (MA, PhD)

Joel Westheimer is an American-born academic who researches citizenship education. He is a professor at the University of Ottawa in Canada.

== Biography ==
Joel Westheimer was born to Manfred and Ruth Westheimer in Washington Heights, New York City. Ruth Westheimer, better known as Dr. Ruth, was a sex therapist, professor, author, and media personality, and one of the first to develop the field of media psychology.

In his youth, Westheimer attended private schools in New York City, which were balanced by a socially-minded educational experiences with Hashomer Hatzair, a socialist-Zionist youth group in weekly meetings, outings, and summer camps, enforcing ideals of community values and equality. Here, he was influenced to believe in building strong education communities that are open to critique and youth leadership.

Westheimer pursued his undergraduate studies in engineering at Princeton University, studying electrical engineering and computer science. He was passionate about this exciting new field and the "counter-cultural cachet" that it exuded in the 1970s and 1980s. His time at Princeton, however, would inform his future world views and pursuits. He studied the connections between society and technology, and took smaller courses in liberal arts, including courses in gender studies. Westheimer went on to be the first male student, and first male engineering student, to earn a certificate in Women's Studies at Princeton.

Westheimer also engaged in travel while studying at Princeton, and spent a half-year working as a computer programmer in Argentina. He became interested in the political scene in the country, which was vastly different from the USA. His time there helped formulate his conceptions of civic education and social movements, as he witnessed protests and Argentina's political recovery.

Music was also important during his time at Princeton. He wrote and played music with Michael Mann, and started a group called "Folksinging" with friend Michael Berkowitz. With this group, they engaged students over politics, social issues, and music, eventually forming strong bonds that created campus movements.

Westheimer's interest in engineering decreased as he became more interested in his other pursuits in university. At the end of his second year, he failed out of his program at Princeton, and was made to reapply in order to be readmitted to the school. He reapplied and graduated from Engineering with Honours.

Westheimer went on to receive a Master's and Ph.D in Education from Stanford. He taught for a brief period at Stanford, before moving to New York University. He left the USA when he received a position at the University of Ottawa, where he now serves as the University Research Chair in Democracy in Education, and is the education columnist for CBC Radio's Ottawa Morning show.

Joel Westheimer lives in Ottawa with his wife and two children.

== Teaching career ==
=== Public schools ===
In 1987, Westheimer began to teach in the New York City public school system. During this time, he enrolled in some courses at Columbia University's Teachers College. He taught middle school at an alternative public school, and utilized a variety of methods such as music, politics, and social examples to teach his students. Eventually wanting to understand the process of schooling more, and needing to enroll in a master's program to continue to teach, he began his post-graduate studies at Stanford University in 1989. He received his Masters in Design and Evaluation of Educational Programs. Rather than returning to teaching, as was his original plan, Westheimer went on to pursue a Ph.D.

=== Stanford University ===
While at Stanford University, Westheimer developed and taught a course called "Experimental Curricula: The Case of Wilderness Education", a project that created curriculum for project-based experiences outside of the classroom, and ran for five years. As a Spencer Dissertation Fellow at Stanford, Westheimer completed his Ph.D. thesis in 1995, titled "Among Schoolteachers: Community, Individuality, and Ideology In Teachers' Work". He thus took on a teaching position as an assistant professor at Stanford.

=== New York University ===
Westheimer was hired as an assistant professor at New York University in 1996, to fulfill a position as a professor of civic engagement, teaching communities, and service learning. In September 1999, Westheimer testified at National Labor Relations Board hearings on behalf of NYU graduate students. The students were attempting to form a union. Westheimer was the only non-tenured professor to testify. He had applied for tenure, and although both internal and external reviewers approved his request, it was eventually denied due to "insufficient scholarship". Westheimer believed his tenure bid was denied because of his defense of the rights of graduate students to unionize: "I remember that, shortly after I testified, I got a letter from an associate dean about something saying that he was "shocked and disappointed" at my behavior." University authorities urged Westheimer to withdraw his bid for tenure "for his own good" so he would not have to put a failed bid for tenure on his CV. Doing so would have prevented him from taking further legal action, so instead he made the case public.

At the start of 2002, the federal government charged the university with illegally firing Westheimer, as his 'extramural utterances' had no bearing on his academic work. After a five-month investigation, the Labor Board concluded that "the real reason for [Professor Westheimer's] denial of tenure was because of his union activities." A settlement was reached soon after, in which the university offered Westheimer financial compensation and redacted its denial of his tenure. Westheimer then moved to Ottawa and became an associate professor of citizenship education at the University of Ottawa.

=== The University of Ottawa ===
Westheimer started his position at The University of Ottawa in 2002, where he teaches today as the University Research Chair in Democracy and Education. His research focuses on social studies education, citizenship education, social justice, and politics and education. He also comments on current affairs in education as CBC Radio's education columnist for the Ottawa Morning show. He was the co-founder and executive director of a research collective focusing on democracy in education and society, called Democratic Dialogue.

== Honours and awards ==
- 2024 Fellow of the American Educational Research Association
- 2023 Excellence in Research Award, University of Ottawa
- 2004-2019 University Research Chair, University of Ottawa
- 2015 Laureate of Kappa Delta Pi
- 2013 Gala 100 Year Honouree for professional leadership in the field of democratic education and workers' rights for academics, Hashomer Hatzair International Youth Organization
- 2013 Appointment to Canadian Teachers Federation/National Education Association Joint Blue Ribbon Expert Panel on Teachers' Working Conditions and Professionalization
- 2012 Knight Fellow for Civic Engagement in Higher Education, Bob Graham Center for Public Service
- 2009–2010 Canadian Education Association's Whitworth Award for Education Research ("Recognizing research that matters.")
- 2008–2009 Choice Review's Significant University Press Titles for Undergraduates for Pledging Allegiance: The Politics of Patriotism in American Schools (Teachers College Press, 2007)
- 2008 Book of the Year Award, Foreword Magazine, for Pledging Allegiance: The Politics of Patriotism in American Schools
- 2004–2006 John Glenn Scholar in Service Learning and Social Justice in Education. Awarded by the John Glenn Institute for Public Service & Public Policy
- 2003 Outstanding Research of the Year Award from the American Political Science Association (APSA), Division on Teaching and Learning (with Joseph Kahne)
- 2003 Outstanding Paper of the Year Award for Research in Social Studies Education, American Educational Research Association (with Joseph Kahne)
- 1999 Goddard Fellowship, New York University
- 1998 Jason Millman Early Career Educational Research Award, Cornell University
- 1998 Daniel E. Griffiths Award for Excellence in Educ. Research, New York University
- 1997 University Research Award, New York University.
- 1993–1994 Spencer Foundation Dissertation Fellowship for Educational Research
- 1992–1994 Stanford University Teaching Fellowship
- 1991–1993 Stanford University Doctoral Fellowship

== Publications ==
=== Books ===
- Among School Teachers: Community, Autonomy, and Ideology in Teacher's Work (1998)
- Pledging Allegiance: The Politics of Patriotism in America's Schools (2007)
- What Kind of Citizen: Educating Our Children for the Common Good (2015)
- What Kind of Citizen: Educating Our Children for the Common Good, Second Edition (2024)
