= German Citizenship Restoration =

Citizenship restoration project

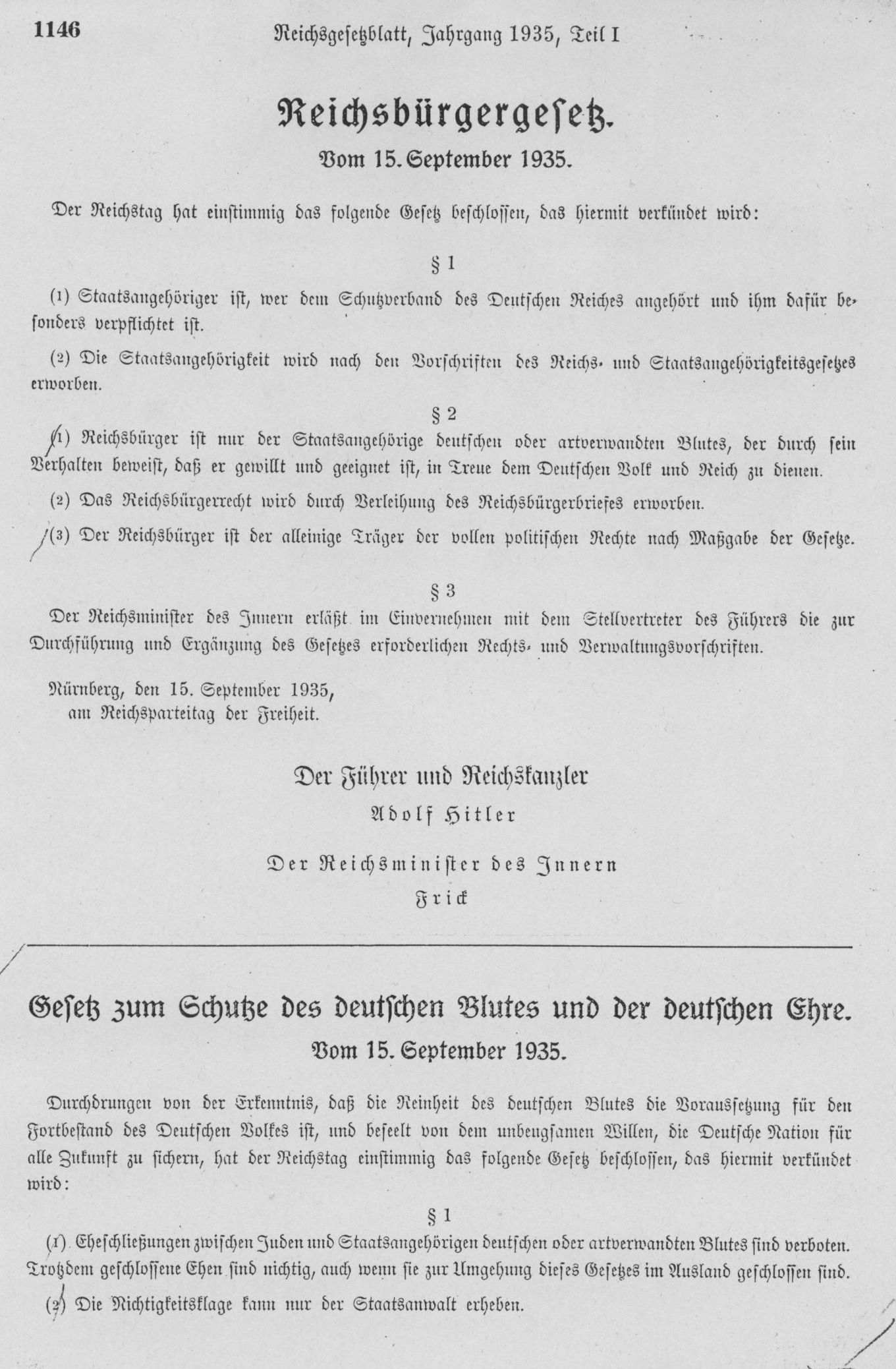
Page 1146 of RGBl. I proclaiming the laws that deprived Jews of German citizenship, issued 16 September 1935

The German Citizenship Project was set up in the United States in 2006, and encourages descendants of Germans deprived of their citizenship by Nazi Germany to reclaim German citizenship without losing the citizenship of their home country. It closed its operations in the United States and moved to the United Kingdom where it resumed its activity in 2019 as "German Citizenship Restoration Ltd. (GCR)".

== Depriving individuals of citizenship ==
From 1933 to 1945, thousands upon thousands of Germans were deprived of their citizenship. Although mostly Jews, others also lost their claim to the rights and protections of citizenship including, for example, Communists, Socialists, members of the Social Democratic party, Conscientious Objectors, Jehovah's Witnesses, and Quakers. In some cases, the deprivation of citizenship occurred specifically with the publication of an individual's name in the Reich Law Gazette (Reichsgesetzblatt). Most, however, lost their citizenship with the passage of the Eleventh Decree to the Law on the Citizenship of the Reich of 25 November 1941. This decree stripped Jews of their remaining rights, and stipulated that Jews living outside Germany were no longer citizens. Consequently, deprived of their citizenship (and their passports nullified), this effectively stranded them in place. However, Romani descendants from survivors of the Porajmos seem not to have been targeted, perhaps in part due to their transient way of life meant less registration as German citizens, fewer survivors than the German Jewish population and also continuing discrimination.

The German government published a list of Jews whose citizenship was annulled: "Name Index of Jews Whose German Nationality was Annulled by the Nazi Regime 1935–1944." The records were created when German citizenship was revoked because of the Nuremberg Laws of 1935. The records are accessible via Web site Ancestry.com. The laws spelled out exactly who was considered Jewish, without the rights and privileges of German citizenship. An admixture of so-called "Jewish blood" with "Aryan blood" made people with three quarters Jewish ancestry (three grandparents) Jewish. People with half or one quarter Jewish ancestry (two or one grandparent) were usually defined as Mischlinge (half-breed) in the first or second degree; the degrees are also dependent on the date of birth, when and if parents married, and if the person had ever practised the Jewish religion.

Deprivation of citizenship in particular applied to all those of Jewish or Jewish–Christian descent. Residents of Nazi Germany could apply for an Ahnenpass if they could prove "German blood" and were thus deemed to be "Aryans". The Ahnenpass was necessary to be eligible for government-regulated occupations such as civil servant, teacher, or lawyer, and later to attend school or marry. From 1938 Jewish men had to add the forename "Israel" to their names, and women had to add "Sarah", so that Jewishness was obvious whenever the full name had to be stated.

== Legal avenues to reclaim citizenship ==
Prior to 1949, any German citizen who had become a citizen of another country before November 25, 1941, would have lost their German citizenship according to Sec. 25 of the German Citizenship Act: they relinquished their citizenship and claimed a different one. However, given the adoption of the Basic Law in 1949, people who emigrated because of Nazi policies and acquired a new citizenship, and their descendants, have the right to the German citizenship that was withdrawn.

The avenue to reclaim citizenship has been available since 1949. Under Article 116 (paragraph 2) of Germany's Basic Law, any citizen during the Nazi regime, or his or her descendants, who lost his or her citizenship for "political, racist, or religious reasons" has the right to have it reinstated. The law does not require them to give up citizenship of whatever country where they currently reside. In 2010, 815 applicants from the United States requested restoration of citizenship.

Specifically, the law reads:

Former German citizens who, between 30 January 1933 and 8 May 1945, were deprived of their citizenship on political, racial or religious grounds and their descendants shall, on application, have their citizenship restored. They shall be deemed never to have been deprived of their citizenship if they have established their domicile in Germany after 8 May 1945 and have not expressed a contrary intention.

The number of applicants from Israel declined from 3,505 in 2003 to 1,459 in 2010.

The lists of Jews deprived of citizenship lists were compiled and indexed, and, after 1959, they were available for research at the Berlin Document Center. There are also lists of Jews who fled Germany, first to France or Vienna, and then to Spain.

Many applications for German citizenship by people who would not have been considered German nationals today, had the deprivation of citizenship not taken place, were rejected. Those rejected included those born before 1 April 1953 to a German mother (descent was only from the father), or to a parent born before that date to a German grandmother. Also those born after that date with a mother or grandmother who had lost her German citizenship on marrying a foreign national, whether before or after fleeing from Nazi Germany. While not providing an automatic right to citizenship, as available to others, two decrees of 30 August 2019 provide those applying for naturalisation under the above circumstances a somewhat privileged status, dropping many requirements for naturalisation otherwise required, leaving only "a basic level of the German language, and basic knowledge of the legal and social order and the living standards prevailing in Germany". Citizenship is not as of right, but subject to the discretion of the Federal Office of Administration.

== Notable reclaimants of citizenship ==
- Ruth Westheimer (born Karola Siegel, 1928–2024; known as "Dr. Ruth"), German-American sex therapist, talk show host, author, professor, and Haganah sniper.

== See also ==
- Nazism and race
- Wannsee Conference
- Mischling
- Nazi eugenics
- Rhineland Bastard
- Rosenstrasse protest
- German passport
