= Ask Dr. Ruth =

2019 documentary film

- Directed by: Ryan White
- Produced by: Jessica Hargrave; Christopher Leggett; Rafael Marmor; Ryan White
- Music by: Blake Neely
- Release date: January 25, 2019 (Sundance Film Festival)
- Country: United States
- Language: English
- Box office: $315,145

Ask Dr. Ruth is a 2019 documentary film directed by Ryan White, and produced by Jessica Hargrave, Christopher Leggett, Rafael Marmor, and Ryan White under the banner of Delirio Films, Neko Productions, and Tripod Media. The film follows German-American sex therapist Ruth Westheimer (Dr. Ruth) as she reflects on her life and career. The film's title derives from the name of Westheimer's syndicated 1987 late-night television series Ask Dr. Ruth.

The film premiered on January 25, 2019, at the Sundance Film Festival. Ask Dr. Ruth won Best Documentary Feature at the Calgary Underground Film Festival, and Unforgettable at the Cinema Eye Honor Awards. It was nominated for Best Documentary at the Hot Docs Canadian International Documentary Festival and the Miami International Film Festival. The film received positive critical reviews.

== Synopsis ==
As German-American sex therapist Ruth Westheimer (Dr. Ruth) approaches her 90th birthday, she reflects on her life and career.

== Cast ==
Credits adapted from Rotten Tomatoes.

- Ruth Westheimer

== Production ==
In 2017, director Ryan White pitched an idea to make a documentary on sex therapist Ruth Westheimer when he was promoting his documentary web series The Keepers. White didn't know that much about Westheimer, other than "90-year-old spoke candidly about sex in a thick German accent".

== Reception ==
=== Box office ===
On its domestic opening weekend the film grossed $93,128, averaging $895 per location. Upon its general release on May 3, 2019, Ask Dr. Ruth earned $93,128. In its second weekend the film made $47,169, a 49.4% decrease. In the Netherlands, Ask Dr. Ruth was released on August 16, 2019, by Cherry, and grossed $16,600. In New Zealand, Ask Dr. Ruth was released on August 16, 2019, by Rialto, and grossed $1,100.

=== Critical response ===
On the review aggregator Rotten Tomatoes, the film holds an approval rating of 92% based on 85 reviews, with an average rating of 7.4/10. The website's critical consensus reads, "Like its subject, Ask Dr. Ruth has a breezy charm that's hard to resist – and a message that's as important as it is entertaining." Metacritic, which uses a weighted average, assigned the film a score of 68 out of 100, based on 18 critics, indicating "generally favorable" reviews.

Maureen Lee Lenker of Entertainment Weekly wrote, "this [Ask Dr. Ruth] film is a compelling, stirring testament to that fact even if it offers up less insight about what makes her tick from the woman herself than one might crave". Justin Chang of the Los Angeles Times wrote, "The director Ryan White ("The Keepers") has fun exploring all that gimmicky pop-cultural detritus, and he also drops in a few greatest-hits montages covering Westheimer's rise to fame, including her interviews with Arsenio Hall and Conan O'Brien, who seem alternately delighted and alarmed by her uninhibited sex talk". Daniel Fienberg of The Hollywood Reporter wrote, "America's favorite diminutive sex therapist gets a crowd-pleasing documentary treatment that traces her life from Holocaust survivor to beloved media figure".

Chance Solem-Pfeifer of the Willamette Week wrote, "Filmmaker Ryan White tries out a half-dozen different documentary approaches—fly-on-the-wall portraiture, media criticism, childhood psychology, staged reunions—and ends up with a film conspicuously less intriguing than its subject". Peter Goldberg of the Slant Magazine wrote, "Ask Dr. Ruth gives a broad overview of the nonagenarian, roughly split into intertwining biographical and thematic strands". Michelle da Silva of Now wrote, "While White has created an intimate portrait, the doc leaves us asking the question, "Why now?" He doesn't connect his subject to current debates around sex education, women's health and sexual violence".

=== Accolades ===
Year	Award	Category	Recipient	Result	Ref(s).
2019	Calgary Underground Film Festival	Best Documentary Feature	Ryan White	Won	
2019	Hot Docs Canadian International Documentary Festival	Best Documentary	Ryan White	Nominated	
2019	Miami International Film Festival	Best Documentary	Ryan White	Nominated	

== See also ==
- Submissions for the Academy Award for Best Documentary Feature
