= Nahalal =

Place in northern Israel

Nahalal: נַהֲלָל (Hebrew)
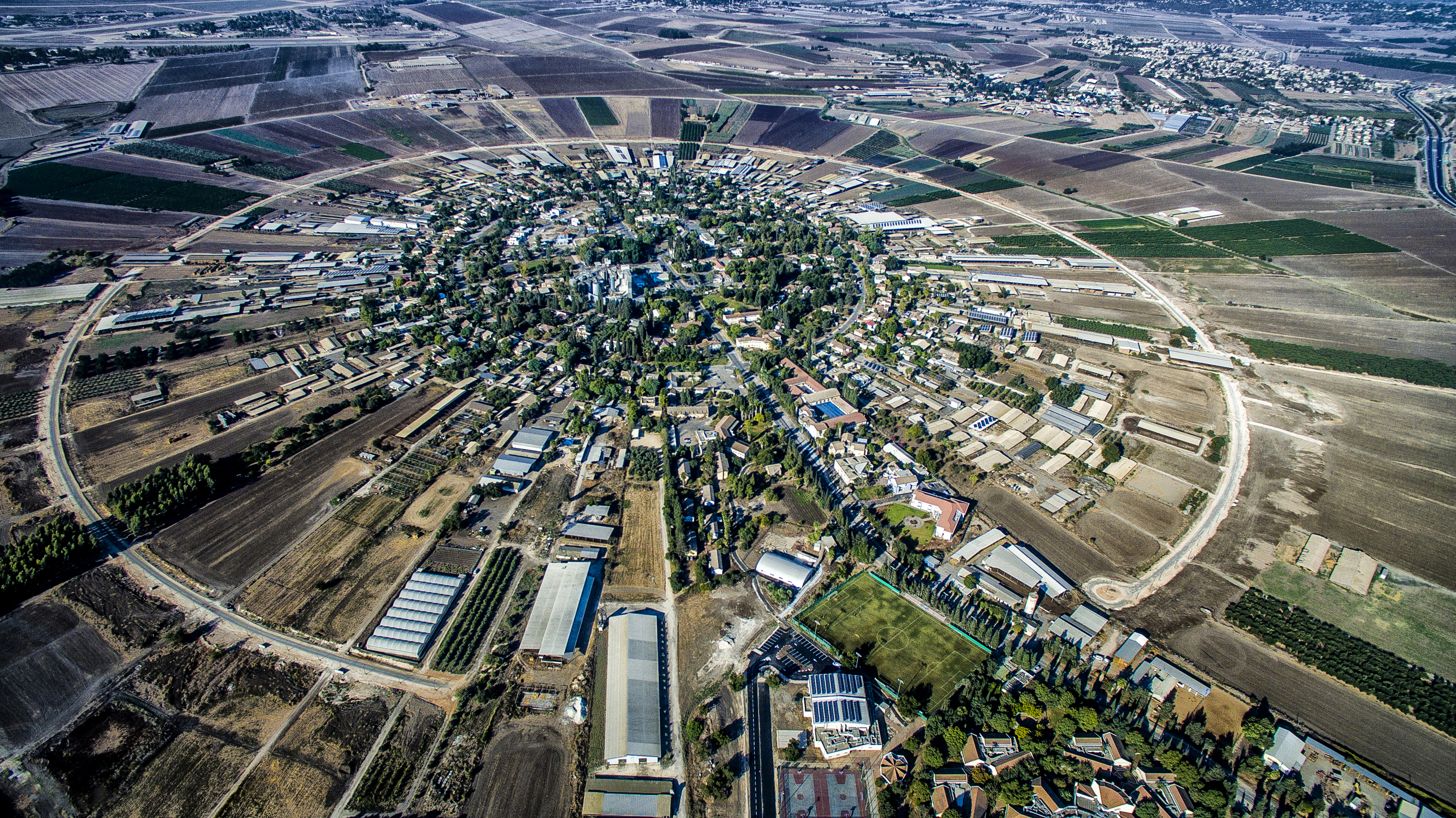
- Aerial view of Nahalal

- Location within Jezreel Valley region of Israel Location within Israel
- Coordinates: 32°41′24″N 35°11′48″E
- Country: Israel
- District: Northern
- Subdistrict: Jezreel
- Council: Jezreel Valley
- Affiliation: Moshavim Movement
- Founded: 11 September 1921
- Founder: Jews from Eastern Europe
- Population (2024): 1,572

Nahalal (Hebrew: נַהֲלָל) is a moshav in northern Israel. Covering 8.5 square kilometers (3.3 mi^{2}), it falls under the jurisdiction of the Jezreel Valley Regional Council. In 2024 it had a population of 1,572.

Nahalal is best known for its general layout, as designed by Richard Kauffmann: slightly oval round, similar to a spoke wheel, with its public buildings at the "hub" and individual plots of agricultural land radiating from it like spokes with symmetrically placed roads creating eight equal sectors, an inner ring of residential buildings, and an outer ring road.

== In the Hebrew Bible ==
Nahalal was a Levitical city mentioned in the Hebrew Bible. According to the Book of Joshua, Nahalal, also transliterated Nahallal, was located in the territory of the tribe of Zebulun (Joshua 19:15), and given to the Merarite division of the Levite tribe (Joshua 21:34–35). In the Book of Judges it is referred to as Nahalol (Judges 1:30).

== History ==
=== Antiquity ===
Archaeological findings in the area suggest human settlement there dates to the Bronze Age, and continued into the Iron Age, Persian era, Hellenistic period, Roman era, and Byzantine era. Among the artifacts found was an ancient Jewish inscription of the word "Sabbath" on a rock, from Nahalal or nearby Shimron.

=== Ottoman Empire: Ma'alul ===
An Arab village in the area, Ma'alul, was incorporated into the Ottoman Empire in 1517. It was identified with the biblical Nahalal by Rabbi Joseph Schwarz in 1850.

=== 20th century ===
==== Arab village of Ma'alul ====
By the 20th century, Ma'alul's inhabitants were tenants of the Sursuq family of Beirut, absentee landlords who had acquired the land earlier. In 1921, they sold all but 2,000 dunams of Ma'alul's land to the Zionist Palestine Land Development Company.

==== Moshav Nahalal ====
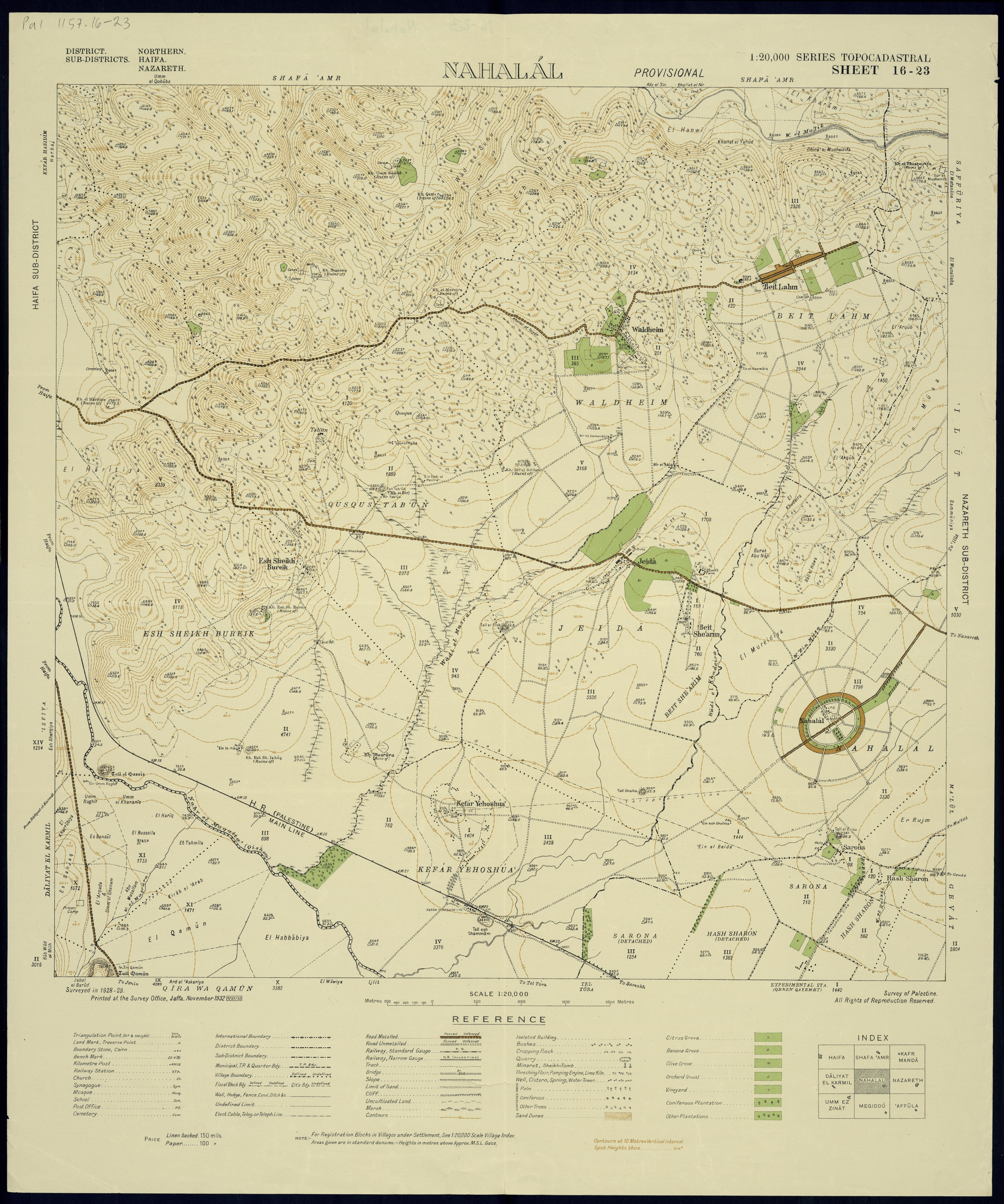
Nahalal in 1932

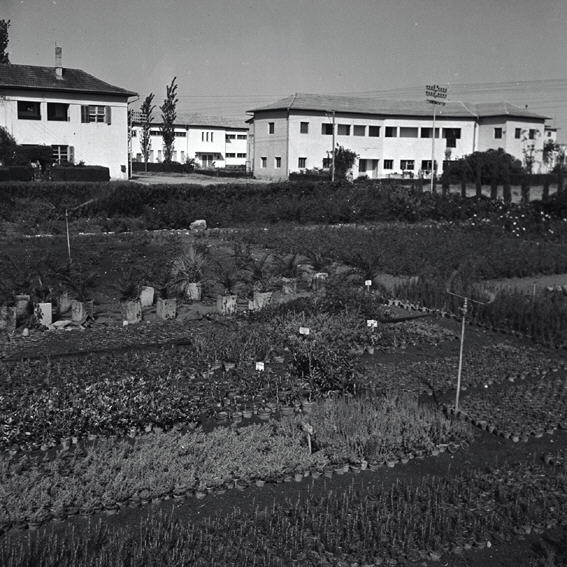
Nahalal school 1944

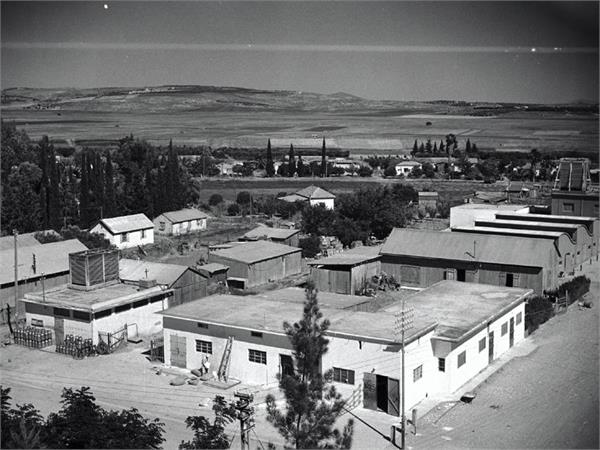
Nahalal 1945

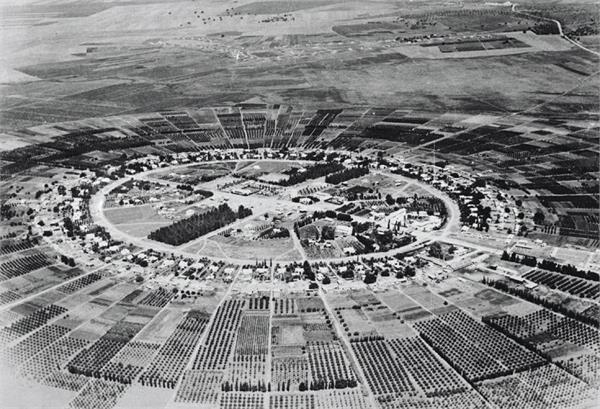
Nahalal 1946

Nahalal was the first moshav ovdim (workers' cooperative agricultural settlement) in Mandatory Palestine. Its founders immigrated to Palestine from Eastern Europe as part of the Second and Third Aliyah between 1904 and 1914, at the end of Ottoman rule.

Some of them had been members of the first kibbutz, Degania. After working in farming communities for a decade, they dreamt of establishing an income-sharing farming community similar to a kibbutz, but they wanted to maintain the nuclear family and household structure (kibbutzim had communal dining, and children were kept in separate housing, where they also slept).

The founders first arrived to the lands given to them by the Jewish National Fund on September 11, 1921. They first saw the allotted land from the hill, noticing that small rivulets transformed the plain into marshes that attracted malaria-spreading anopheles mosquitoes. Heeding the warnings of experts, such as Dr. Hillel Yaffe, the Jewish pioneers temporarily settled on a nearby hill, near the Arab village of Ma'lul. Later they came down from the hill and divided the land, initially into 80 equal parcels, 75 to the members and 5 to Nahalal agricultural school.

The physical layout of Nahalal, devised by architect Richard Kauffmann in 1921, became the pattern for many moshavim established before 1948. It is based on concentric circles, with the public buildings (school, administration offices, services, and warehouses) in the centre, the homes of non-farming families (craftsmen, teachers, etc.) around the centre, then a ring street with the farmers' homesteads bordering on it on the outside, and beyond those, ever-widening circles of gardens and fields. The equal parcelling of the land became the trademark geometric shape of Nahalal.

According to a census conducted in 1922 by the British Mandate authorities, Nahalal had a population of 437 Jews.

On 22 December 1932, a member of Nahalal, Yosef Ya'akobi, and his 9-year-old son David were killed when a bomb was thrown into their home. Halim Basta, a Coptic policeman for the Mandatory government solved the crime the following year, identifying followers of Izz ad-Din al-Qassam as the murderers. In 1937, Basta was himself murdered.

== Education ==
In 1929, a Girls' Agricultural Training Farm was established at Nahalal by Hana Meisel of the Women's International Zionist Organization. In the 1940s it became a co-educational farming school of the Youth Aliyah movement.

== Notable residents ==
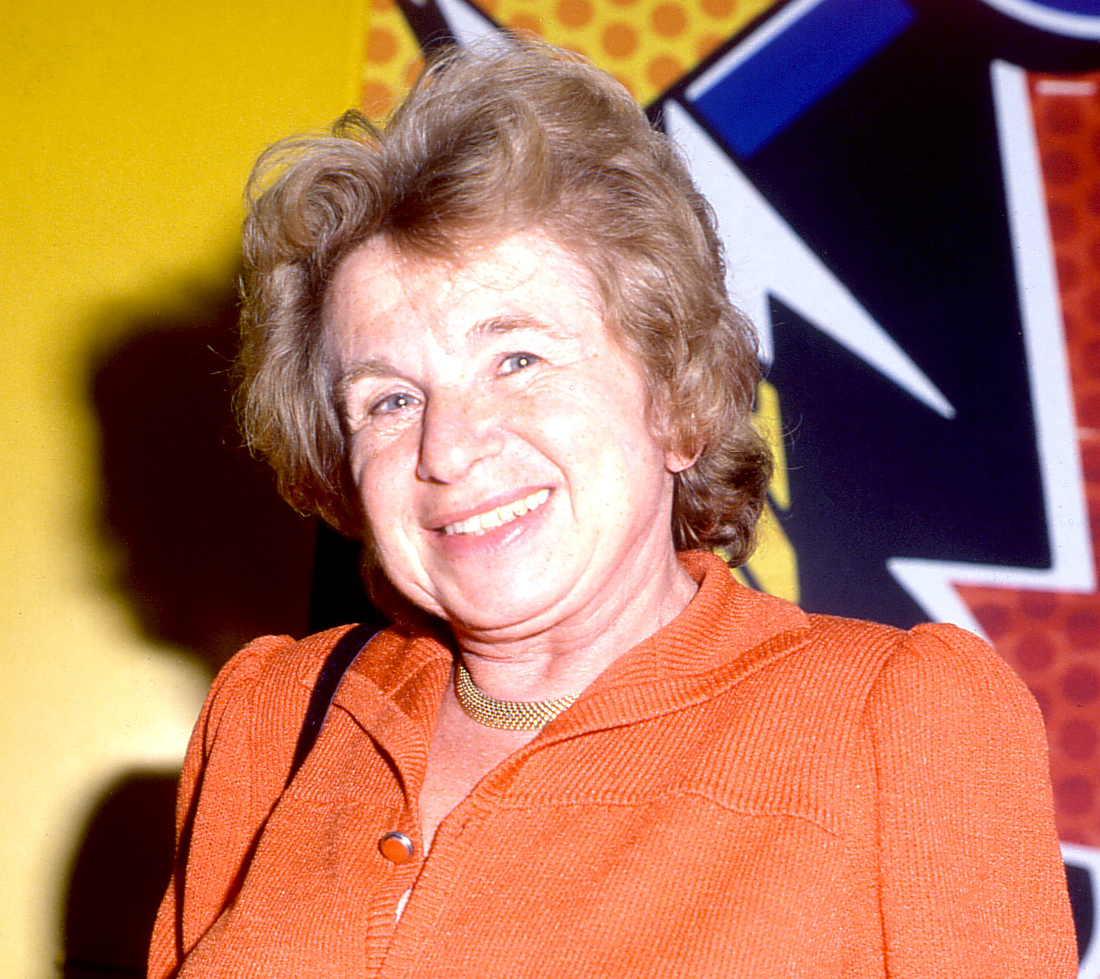
Ruth Westheimer

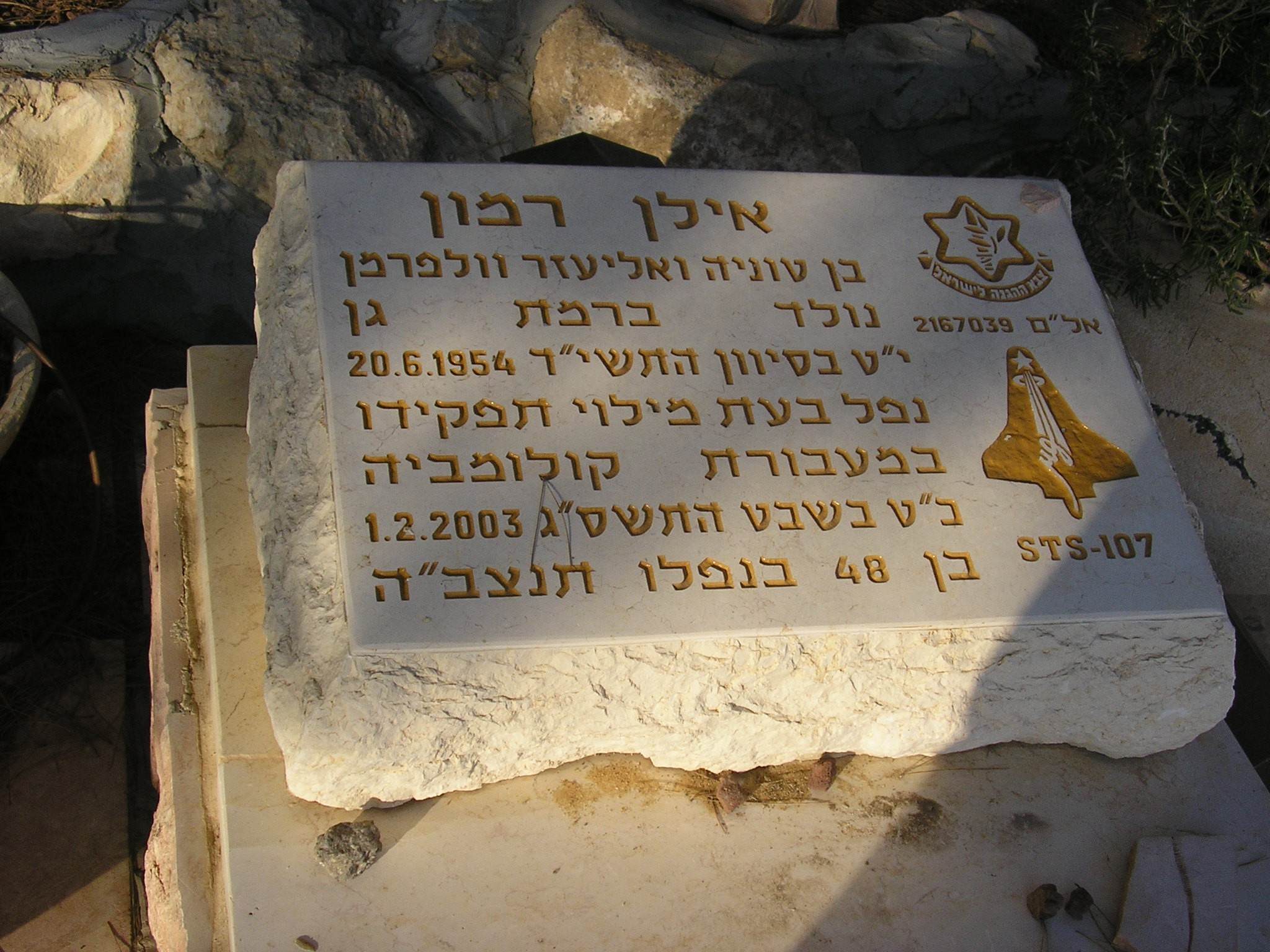
Ilan Ramon's grave in Nahalal

- Ram (Rami) Ben-Barak (born 1958), politician
- Moshe "Muki" Betser (born 1945), commando officer
- Assi Dayan (1945–2014), film director, actor, screenwriter, and producer; son of Moshe Dayan
- Moshe Dayan (1915–1981), Israeli minister and military general
- Ruth Dayan (née Schwartz, 1917-2021), social activist; first wife of Moshe Dayan
- Shmuel Dayan (1891–1968), activist and politician; father of Moshe Dayan
- Yael Dayan (1939–2024), MK and daughter of Moshe Dayan
- Pnina Gary (1927–2023), actress and theatre director
- Yehonatan Geffen (1947–2023), musician, nephew of Moshe Dayan
- Amos Hadar (1923–2014), politician, Member of the Knesset
- Roy Kafri (born 1985), artist, comedian and musician
- Shaul Mofaz (born 1948), Israeli minister and military general
- Aryeh Nehemkin (1925–2021), Minister of Agriculture
- Moshe Peled (soldier), Israeli general during the Yom Kippur War
- Amir Pnueli (1941–2009), computer scientist
- Nissan Rilov (1922–2007), artist, soldier, activist
- Meir Shalev (1948-2023), writer and newspaper columnist
- Hannah Szenes (1921-1944), poet and paramilitary
- Ruth Westheimer (1928–2024; born Karola Siegel and known as "Dr. Ruth"), German-American sex therapist, talk show host, author, professor, Holocaust survivor, and former Haganah sniper.

Note:

- Ilan Ramon (1954–2003), Israel's first astronaut, is buried in the Nahalal Cemetery, though he never lived in Nahalal.
