= Amos Hadar =

Israeli politician (1923–2014)

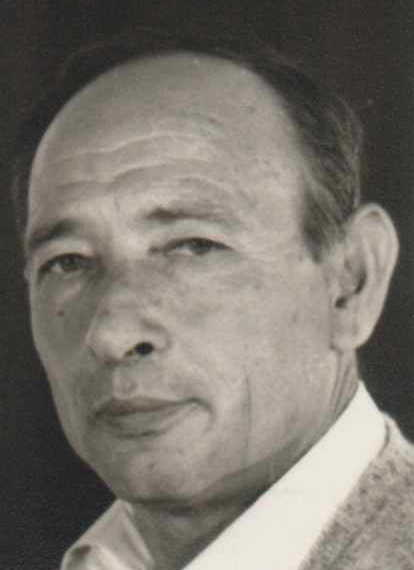
- Hadar during his time in the Knsset

Faction represented in the Knesset
- 1974–1981: Alignment

Personal details
- Born: 7 September 1923 Nahalal, Mandatory Palestine
- Died: 13 January 2014 (aged 90)

Amos Hadar (Hebrew: עמוס הדר; 7 September 1923 – 13 January 2014) was an Israeli politician who served as a member of the Knesset for the Alignment between 1974 and 1981.

== Biography ==
Born Amos Horowitz in Nahalal during the Mandate era, Hadar was a cousin of Moshe Dayan. During his youth he was a member of the HaNoar HaOved youth movement. He enlisted in the British Army during World War II and served in the Jewish Brigade. He was sent to Italy in May 1945, where Jewish Brigade soldiers encountered Holocaust survivors. Hadar remained in Italy after the brigade was dissolved in 1946 to work with Jewish refugees, and was assigned to provide military training for future service in the defense of the Jewish state before returning to Palestine in 1947. He served as a platoon commander in the Israel Defense Forces during the 1948 Arab–Israeli War. He was involved in battles in the Jordan Valley and Mishmar HaEmek. He became secretary of the Nahalal moshav, and also volunteered for the Bnei HaMoshavim movement in the Negev during the 1960s. In 1964, he became secretary of the Economic Committee of the Moshavim Movement, and the following year joined the new Rafi party. His brother Yigal was also involved in politics, and became a Knesset member in 1969 and later served as a minister.

In 1973 Amos was on the Alignment list (an alliance of the Labor Party, which Rafi had merged into in 1968, and Mapam) for the elections that year, but failed to win a seat. However, he entered the Knesset on 8 April the following year as a replacement for Uzi Feinerman. He was re-elected in 1977, but lost his seat in the 1981 elections.

Between 1982 and 1985, he served as secretary general of the Moshavim Movement. He died in 2014 at the age of 90, and was buried in Nahalal Cemetery.
