= Catholic Church of Ma'alul =

Coordinates: 32°41′51.5″N 35°14′34.6″E

- הכנסייה הקתולית
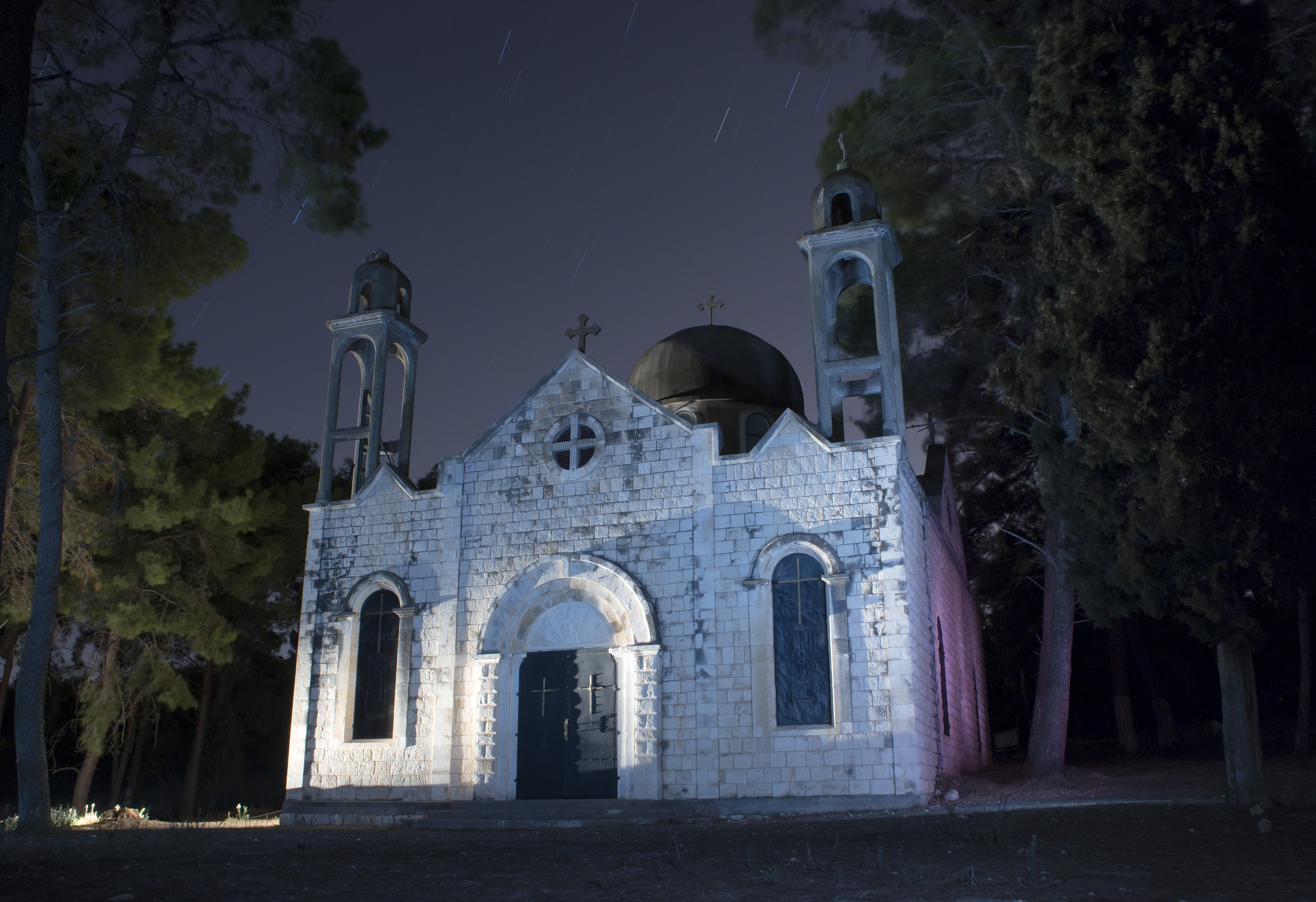
- Catholic Church of Ma'alul
- Location: Ma'alul
- Country: Israel
- Denomination: Roman Catholic Church

The Catholic Church of Ma'alul (Hebrew: הכנסייה הקתולית) is a Catholic church in the village of Ma'alul in northern Israel.

== History ==
The church was restored in 2011 and together with a Greek Orthodox Church and a mosque part of what remains of the ancient Arab village of Ma'alul, just a few kilometers west of Nazareth and which was formed mainly by Christian Palestinians until 1948 when it was destroyed during the 1947–1949 Palestine war.

The church is managed by descendants of the original inhabitants.

== See also ==
- Roman Catholicism in Israel
- Latin Patriarchate of Jerusalem
- Christianity in Israel

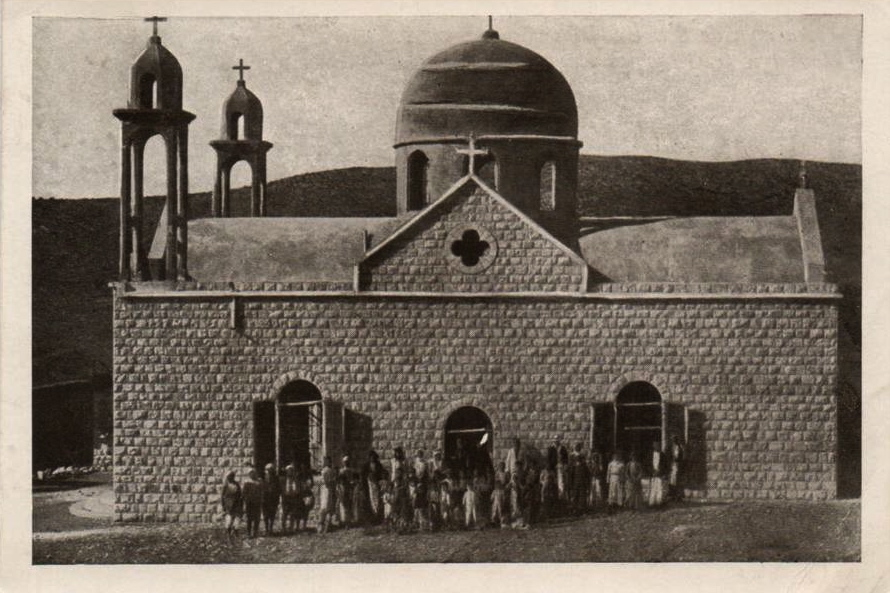
The Church in the late 1930s
