= Eileen DeSandre =

American actress

Eileen DeSandre is an American stage actress and a member of the Actors' Equity Association. Known for much of her career as a character actor in the Oregon Shakespeare Festival in Ashland, Oregon, she has more recently taken lead roles in a variety of theaters. She has an M.F.A. in acting from Pennsylvania State University, and a B.A. in French and theater from Seton Hill University.

== Recent roles ==
- 2020. Dr. Ruth Westheimer, Becoming Dr. Ruth, Orlando Shakes, Orlando, FL.
- 2019. Bella Sacker, Fragments, Rogue Theater Company, Ashland, OR.
- 2014. Dr. Ruth Westheimer, Becoming Dr. Ruth, Virginia Repertory Theatre, Richmond, VA.
- 2013. Miss Helen, The Road to Mecca, Profile Theater, Portland, OR. This role earned her critical acclaim and a Drammy Award for Actress in a Lead Role.
- 2012. Louise, Private Lives, Rubicon Theatre, Ventura, CA.
- 2011. Mom, Spin Cycle, Innovation Theatre Works, Bend OR.
- 2011. Joan of Arc, Joan of Arc at the Stake (Jeanne d'Arc au bûcher), Oregon Bach Festival, Eugene, OR.
- 2010. Nurse, Romeo and Juliet, The Riverside Theatre, New York, NY.

== Oregon Shakespeare Festival roles ==
- 2015. Verges, in Much Ado About Nothing
- 2009. Brighella, Ensemble in The Servant of Two Masters
- 2009. Bertha Katz in Paradise Lost (play)
- 2008. Flute in A Midsummer Night's Dream
- 2008. Madaniḱā in The Clay Cart
- 2007. Mme. Pernelle in Tartuffe
- 2007. Gertrud in On the Razzle
- 2006. Emilia, Ensemble in The Winter's Tale
- 2006. Speed in The Two Gentlemen of Verona
- 2005. Sasha Smirnoff in Room Service
- 2005. Holofernes in Love's Labor's Lost
- 2004. Dr. Pinch, Ensemble in The Comedy of Errors
- 2004. Della in The Royal Family
- 2003. Monica Reed in Present Laughter
- 2003. Juliana Tesman in Hedda Gabler
- 2002. Popilius Lena and Clitus in Julius Caesar
- 2002. Aunt Meme in Saturday, Sunday, Monday
- 2001. Heidi in Fuddy Meers
- 2001. Andromache in Troilus and Cressida
- 2000. Nurse Preen in The Man Who Came to Dinner
- 1999. Go-to-Hell Kitty in Chicago
- 1999. Mrs. Helseth in Rosmersholm
- 1998. Mrs. Candour in The School for Scandal
- 1998. Maria Vasilyevna in Uncle Vanya
- 1997/98. Maddalena Guarneri in the Oregon Shakespeare Festival and Kennedy Center productions of The Magic Fire
- 1997. Amira in Pentecost
- 1996. Emilia in The Winter's Tale
- 1996. Bessie Berger in Awake and Sing!
- 1995. Maria in Twelfth Night
- 1995. The Maid in Blood Wedding
- 1994. Rhea in You Can't Take It with You

== Early roles ==
DeSandre has also performed with Milwaukee Repertory Theater, Bloomsburg Theatre Ensemble, Theatre of East Carolina, Fulton Opera House, St. Vincent Theatre, Theatre for the New City, Promenade Theatre, and INTAR.
