= Ruth Westheimer =

German-American sex therapist (1928–2024)

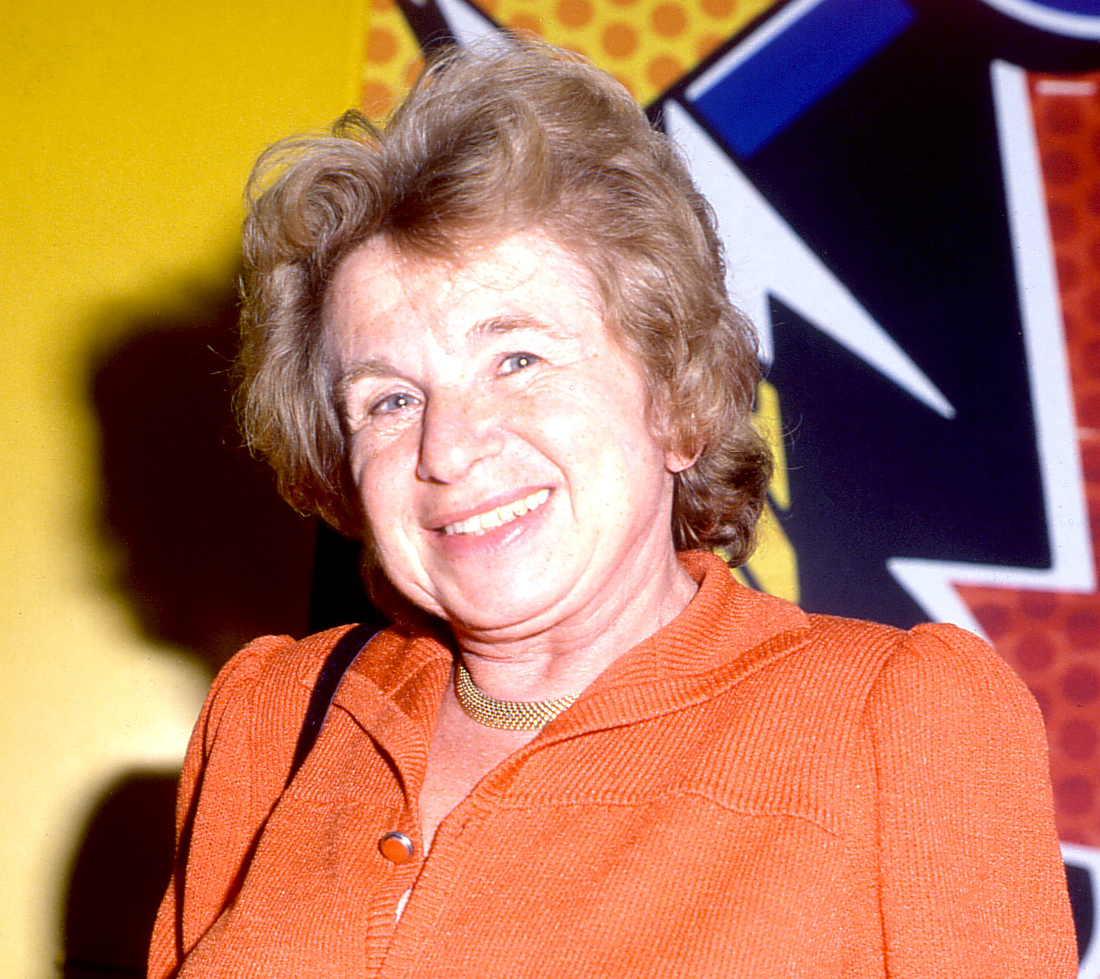
- Westheimer in 1988
- Born: Karola Ruth Siegel; June 4, 1928; Wiesenfeld, Bavaria, Germany
- Died: July 12, 2024 (aged 96); New York City, U.S.
- Other names: Dr. Ruth; Ruth K. Siegel; Ruth K. Westheimer
- Citizenship: German Reich (until 1935); United States (from 1965); Germany (from 2007)
- Education: University of Paris (BA); The New School (MA); Columbia University (EdD); Cornell University
- Occupations: Sex therapist; academic; talk show host; author
- Years active: 1959–2024
- Height: 4 ft 7 in (140 cm)
- Board member of: Museum of Jewish Heritage
- Spouses: David Bar-Haim (m. 1950; div. 1955) Dan Bommer (m. 1956; div. 1957) Manfred Westheimer (m. 1961; died 1997)
- Children: 2, including Joel Westheimer
- Awards: Radio Hall of Fame; Magnus Hirschfeld Medal; Ellis Island Medal of Honor; Leo Baeck Medal; Margaret Sanger Award; Order of Merit of the Federal Republic of Germany
- Military career
- Allegiance: Israel
- Branch: Haganah
- Service years: 1946–1949
- Conflict: 1948 Arab–Israeli War
- Website: drruth.com

Karola Ruth Westheimer (née Siegel; June 4, 1928 – July 12, 2024), better known as Dr. Ruth, was a German and American sex therapist and talk show host.

Westheimer was born in Germany to a Jewish family. As the Nazis came to power, her parents sent the 10-year-old girl to a school in Switzerland for safety while they remained behind because of her elderly grandmother. Both were killed in concentration camps. After World War II, she emigrated to British-controlled Mandatory Palestine. At 4 feet 7 inches (140 cm) tall and 17 years of age, she joined the Haganah, and was trained as a sniper. On her 20th birthday, she was wounded in action by an exploding shell during mortar fire on Jerusalem during the 1947–1949 Palestine War, and almost lost both feet.

Two years later, Westheimer moved to Paris, France, where she studied psychology at the Sorbonne. Immigrating to the United States in 1956, she worked as a maid to put herself through graduate school, earned a Master of Arts in sociology from The New School in 1959, and earned a doctorate at age 42 from Teachers College, Columbia University, in 1970. Over the next decade, she taught at a number of universities and had a private sex therapy practice.

Westheimer's media career began in 1980 with the radio call-in show Sexually Speaking, which continued until 1990. In 1983 it was the top-rated radio show in the country's largest radio market. She then launched a television show, The Dr. Ruth Show, which by 1985 attracted two million viewers a week. She became known for giving serious advice while being candid, but also warm, cheerful, funny, and respectful, and for her tag phrase: "Get some". In 1984 The New York Times noted that she had risen "from obscurity to almost instant stardom." She hosted several series on the Lifetime Channel and other cable television networks from 1984 to 1993. She became a household name and major cultural figure, appeared on several network TV shows, co-starred in a movie with Gérard Depardieu, appeared on the cover of People, sang on a Tom Chapin album, appeared in several commercials, and hosted Playboy videos. She was the author of 45 books on sex and sexuality.

The one-woman 2013 play Becoming Dr. Ruth, written by Mark St. Germain, is about Westheimer's life, as is the 2019 documentary, Ask Dr. Ruth, directed by Ryan White. She was inducted into the Radio Hall of Fame, and awarded the Magnus Hirschfeld Medal, the Ellis Island Medal of Honor, the Leo Baeck Medal, the Planned Parenthood Margaret Sanger Award, and the Order of Merit of the Federal Republic of Germany.

== Early life and education ==
=== Germany ===
I come from Nazi Germany. And the one thing I've learned is that you must stand up for what you believe.

Westheimer was born Karola Ruth Siegel, on June 4, 1928, in the small village of Wiesenfeld (now part of Karlstadt am Main), in Germany. She was the only child of Orthodox Jews, Irma (née Hanauer), a housekeeper, and Julius Siegel, a notions wholesaler and son of the family for whom Irma worked. From the age of one, she lived in an apartment in Frankfurt with her parents and her paternal grandmother, Selma, who was a widow. She was given an early grounding in Judaism by her father, who took her regularly to the synagogue in the Nordend district of Frankfurt, where they lived.

Her father, 38 years old at the time, was taken away by the Nazis, who sent him to the Dachau concentration camp a week after Kristallnacht, the "Night of Broken Glass", when Nazis burned down 10,000 Jewish stores as well as Jewish homes and synagogues, in November 1938. She cried while her father was taken away by Gestapo men who loaded him on a truck, while her grandmother handed the Nazis money, pleading, "Take good care of my son."

=== Switzerland ===
Westheimer's mother and grandmother decided that Nazi Germany was too dangerous for her, due to the growing Nazi violence. Therefore, a few weeks later, in January 1939, they sent her on the Kindertransport, an organized Jewish children's rescue train to Switzerland, though she desperately did not want to leave. Ruth, then aged 10, was never hugged again as a child.

She arrived at an orphanage of a Jewish charity in Heiden, Switzerland, as one of 300 Jewish children, some as young as six years of age. By the end of World War II, nearly all of them were orphans, as their parents never made it out of Germany and were murdered by the Nazis. In the orphanage she was given cleaning responsibilities and took on the role of a caregiver and mother-like figure to the younger children. She remained at the orphanage for six years. Girls at the orphanage were not allowed to take classes at the local school. However, a boy at the school secretly loaned her his textbooks at night so she could read them in secret and continue her education.

While at the Swiss orphanage, Westheimer corresponded with her mother and grandmother via letters. Their letters ceased in 1941, when her parents and her paternal grandmother were deported to Łódź Ghetto on 20 October 1941. There, her father and his mother died in 1942. Before learning about this later in her life, she had believed that her father was murdered in the Auschwitz concentration camp in 1942. There is no information about the specific circumstances of her mother's death. In the database at the Yad Vashem World Holocaust Remembrance Center, Westheimer's mother is categorized as verschollen, or "disappeared/murdered". In addition to Westheimer's parents, all of her other relatives lost their lives during the Holocaust.

For many years, she lived with an "irrational guilt"; she thought that if she had stayed in Germany, she could have saved her parents. Later, she said the guilt had been replaced by an admiration for her parents' sacrifice in sending her to safety, saying: "I would not have the courage to send my own children away like that."

=== Israel ===
After World War II ended, Westheimer decided to immigrate to British-controlled Mandatory Palestine at 16 years of age. After she immigrated to Mandatory Palestine in September 1945, at the age of 17, she joined Kibbutz Ramat David and worked in agriculture. Told her name was too German, she changed her name from Karola to her middle name, Ruth and went by Ruth K. Siegel, retaining Karola as her middle initial in case her parents came looking for her. She "first had sexual intercourse on a starry night, in a haystack, without contraception." She later told The New York Times that "I am not happy about that, but I know much better now and so does everyone who listens to my radio program." Next, she lived on Moshav Nahalal, and then, she lived on Kibbutz Yagur. She then moved to Jerusalem in 1948 to study early childhood education.

Though I am only 4 feet 7 inches tall, with a gun in my hand I am the equal of a soldier who's 6 feet 7 — and perhaps even at a slight advantage, as I make a smaller target.

— Ruth Westheimer

Westheimer joined the Haganah Jewish Zionist underground paramilitary organization (later, the Israel Defense Forces) in Jerusalem. Because of her diminutive height of 4 feet 7 inches (140 cm), she was trained as a scout and sniper. Of this experience, she said, "I never killed anybody, but I know how to throw hand grenades and shoot." She became an ace sniper, and learned to assemble a rifle in the dark. When she was 90 years old, she demonstrated that she was still able to put together a Sten gun with her eyes closed.

In 1948, on her 20th birthday, Westheimer was seriously wounded in action by an exploding shell during a mortar fire attack on Jerusalem during the 1948 Palestine war; the explosion killed two girls who were right next to her. Temporarily paralyzed and with two injured feet (one missing a top portion), she spent months in a recuperative ward before walking again. In 2018 she said that she still visited Israel every year, and felt that it was her real home, and the following year said that she was and is a Zionist.

=== France ===
In 1950, at the age of 22, Westheimer married and moved to France with her first husband, David Bar-Haim, an Israeli soldier who had been accepted to medical school in Paris. There, she studied psychology under psychologist Jean Piaget at the University of Paris (the Sorbonne), and earned an undergraduate degree despite not having had a high school education and supported herself by teaching kindergarten. She then taught psychology at the Sorbonne. Her first marriage ended as Bar-Heim eventually gave up his studies and decided to return to Israel while Westheimer remained in Paris to continue her studies. They divorced in 1955.

=== United States ===
In 1956, using a 5,000 German marks restitution cheque paid by the German government to children whose education was disrupted by the Holocaust, she immigrated to the United States with her French boyfriend, Dan Bommer, settling in Washington Heights, Manhattan. They married and had a daughter, Miriam, but soon divorced. She worked as a maid, initially for 75 cents an hour and later for one dollar an hour (equivalent to $11.84 today) to put herself through graduate school.

Westheimer earned an M.A. degree in sociology from The New School in 1959, with the help of a scholarship. She was a single mother, and an organization named Jewish Family Service paid for her then-three-year-old daughter to stay with a foster family during the day and go to a German Jewish Orthodox nursery school while Westheimer worked and went to classes at The New School. In 1970, at 42 years old, she received a Doctor of Education (Ed.D.) degree in Family-Life Studies from Teachers College, Columbia University with the help of a scholarship, studying under Shirley Zussman. She then trained as a sex therapist at the New York Hospital-Cornell Medical Center/Cornell Medical School, working for seven years under sex therapist Helen Singer Kaplan, two years training under her and five years training others.

In 1965, Westheimer became a naturalized U.S. citizen. In 1961, she married for the third time She regained her German citizenship in 2007 through the German Citizenship Project that enabled descendants of Germans deprived of their citizenship during Nazi rule to reclaim their citizenship without losing the citizenship of their home country.

== Early career ==
After receiving her doctorate, Westheimer briefly worked for Planned Parenthood in Harlem training women to teach sex education, and this experience encouraged her to continue studying human sexuality. She went on to work as a postdoctoral researcher at New York-Presbyterian Hospital. She continued to work there as an adjunct associate professor for five years. She also taught at Lehman College, Brooklyn College, Hunter College, Adelphi University, Columbia University, Yale University, Princeton University, New York University, New York Hospital-Cornell Medical Center/Weill Cornell Medicine, and West Point. She treated sex therapy patients in a private practice, on East 73rd Street on the Upper East Side of Manhattan.

== Media career ==
Make believe it's an ice cream cone.

— Westheimer, upon being asked for advice as to how to perform oral sex on a man.

Described as "Grandma Freud" and the "Sister Wendy of Sexuality", Westheimer helped revolutionize talk about sex and sexuality on radio and television, advocating for speaking openly about sexual issues. She fielded questions ranging from women who did not have orgasms, to the best time of day to have sex (the morning), to men with premature ejaculations, to foreplay, to oral sex, to sexual fantasies ("embrace them"; "If you want to believe that a whole football team is in bed with you, that's fine"), to masturbation, to erections, to sexual positions, to the G-spot. She stressed that: "anything that two consenting adults do in the privacy of their bedroom or kitchen floor is all right with me". She spoke out against engaging in any sexual activity under pressure. She was against the use of drugs, and said she could not deal with sadomasochism and pedophilia. She educated her listeners about sexually transmitted diseases, and spoke out strongly in favor of having sex, in favor of contraception being used, in favor of the availability of abortion as an aid for contraception failures, in favor of sex within relationships rather than one-night stands, in favor of funding for Planned Parenthood, and in favor of research on AIDS. She became known for giving serious advice while being candid and funny, but warm, cheerful, and respectful; and for her tag phrase: "Get some." Journalist Joyce Wadler described her as a "world class charmer".

One journalist described her voice as "a cross between Henry Kissinger and Minnie Mouse". She was noted for having "an accent only a psychologist could love", one that was "dripping chicken soup."

In 1984 The New York Times noted that on radio the 55-year-old had risen "from obscurity to almost instant stardom." Journalist Jeannette Catsoulis wrote later in The New York Times, "It's hard to explain how revolutionary her humor, candor and sexual explicitness seemed for the time."

=== 1980–1989 ===
When it comes to sex, the most important six inches are the ones between the ears.

— Ruth Westheimer

Westheimer's media career began in 1980 when she was 52 years old, and her radio show, Sexually Speaking, debuted on WYNY-FM in New York City. In it, she answered questions called in by listeners, and the show became nationally syndicated. She was offered the opportunity after she gave a lecture to New York broadcasters about the need for sex education programming to help deal with issues of contraception and unwanted pregnancies. Betty Elam, the community affairs manager at WYNY, was impressed with her talk and offered Westheimer $25 per week to make Sexually Speaking, which started as a 15-minute show airing every Sunday at midnight, which was historically a dead time.

By 1981, as the show attracted 250,000 listeners every week despite the network not doing any promotion for it—growing simply by word of mouth—it was extended to be one hour long on Sunday nights, starting at 10 pm. It was soon picked up by 90 stations across the United States, and it ran for a decade. The show broke taboos of the time against speaking publicly and explicitly about sex. The New York Times described it as one of the station's "oddest shows", and among its biggest draws. A New York University professor of human sexuality made listening to her show a class assignment. When the station offered a "Dr. Ruth T-shirt" ("Sex on Sunday? You Bet!"), it received 3,500 orders.

By 1982, her show was WYNY's top-rated phone-in talk show. Singer Pattie Brooks recorded a song as an ode to her, "Dr. Ruth," with a trendy, dance-rock tinged, high pressure beat.

By 1983 her show was the top-rated radio show in the country's largest radio market. In 1984 NBC Radio began syndicating the radio program nationwide—it was now heard in 93 markets. She went on to produce her radio show until 1990.

In 1984, Westheimer began hosting several television programs on the Lifetime TV network, and one in syndication. Her first show was Good Sex! With Dr. Ruth Westheimer, airing for a half hour at 10 pm on weeknights. She ended each show by reminding her audience: "Have good sex!"

The show was expanded in 1985 to a full hour, and its name was changed to The Dr. Ruth Show. During each of her live shows, 3,000 callers tried to get through, and the show attracted an average of 450,000 viewers a night, double the audience previously watching at that hour, and attracted more viewers than any other show on Lifetime; that number rose to two million homes a week. In April 1985 she appeared on the cover of People. That year she also appeared as an actress in the French romantic comedy film Une Femme ou Deux (One Woman or Two), starring Gérard Depardieu and Sigourney Weaver, playing the part of a wealthy philanthropist.

Dr. Ruth's Game of Good Sex was released in 1985. A Baltimore distributor said: "I'm going to have to compare this to Trivial Pursuit. The orders overshadow anything we've had in our company's 100-year history." Dr. Ruth's Computer Game of Good Sex was a hit, released in 1986 for the Commodore 64, MS-DOS, and Apple II.

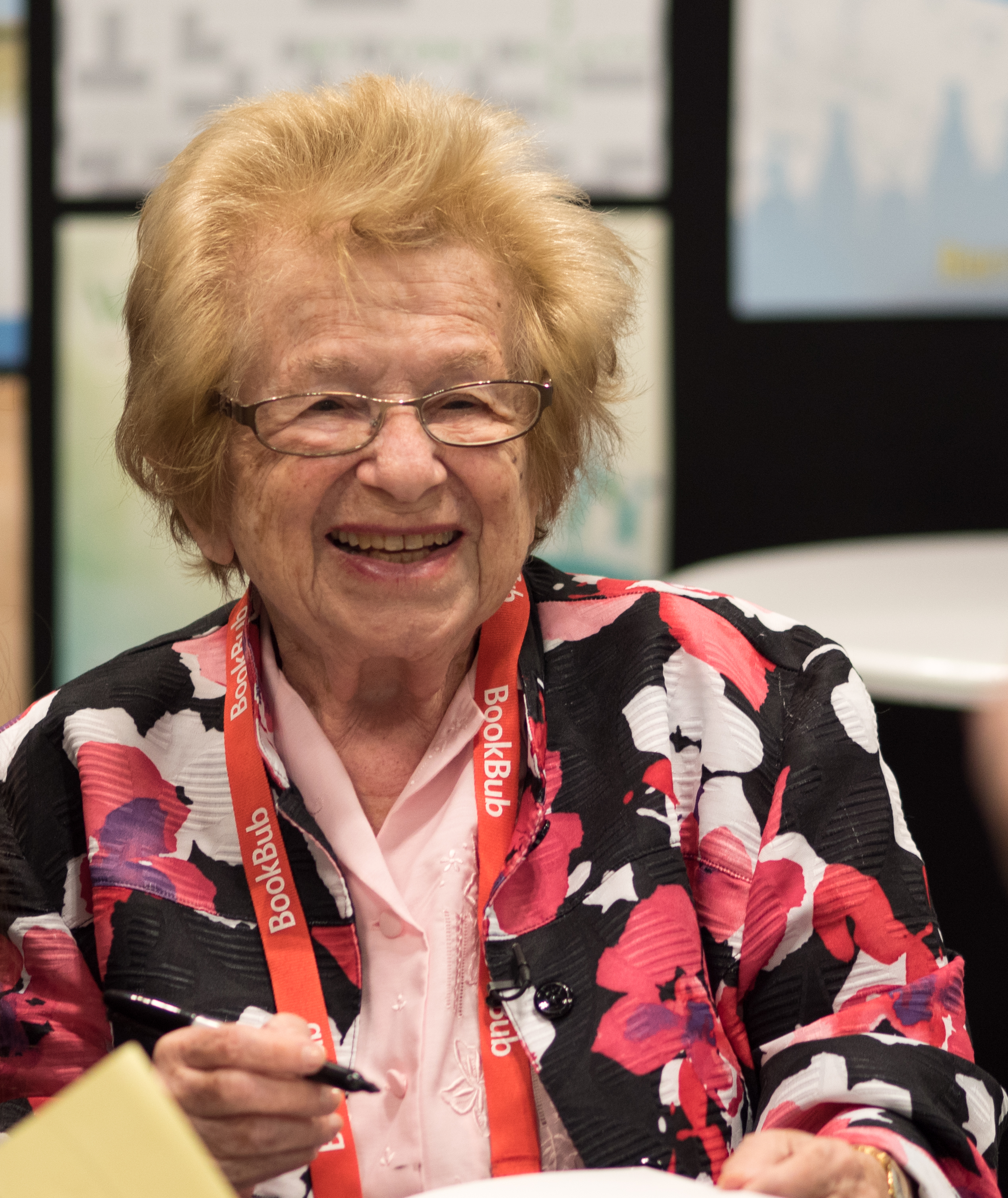
Westheimer in 2018

In 1987, she began a separate half-hour syndicated series on many broadcast stations called Ask Dr. Ruth, which was co-hosted by Larry Angelo. Westheimer's friend Eleanor Bergstein, the writer of the 1987 romantic drama dance film Dirty Dancing, attempted to cast her to play Mrs. Schumacher in the film (with Joel Grey as her husband). She backed out when she learned the character is a thief.

She appeared on a TV Guide cover in 1988. Dr. Ruth returned to the Lifetime network in 1988 with The All New Dr. Ruth Show. That was followed in 1989 by two teen advice shows called What's Up, Dr. Ruth?, and a call-in show, You're on the Air with Dr. Ruth in 1990. That year she also appeared in an episode of the television series Tall Tales & Legends as the "Mysterious Stranger."

During the 1980s, "Dr. Ruth" became a household name and a major cultural figure; during the 1980s and 1990s, she made frequent guest appearances on several network television shows, including Late Night with David Letterman, and appeared on talk shows on German television. She was portrayed on Saturday Night Live by Mary Gross in "Saturday Night News" four times in 1983, and twice in 1984; was a guest on The Tonight Show Starring Johnny Carson twice in 1982, once in 1983, three times in 1984, twice in 1985 – in addition to being impersonated in a "Mighty Carson Art Players" sketch, and once in 1986; on Joan Rivers: Can We Talk? twice in 1986; seven times as a panelist on the game show The New Hollywood Squares in 1986–87; on The Arsenio Hall Show once in 1989; on The Joan Rivers Show once in 1989; and on Live with Regis and Kathie Lee in both 1989 and 1990. In 1987, she made a TV commercial for Signal mouthwash.

=== 1990–1999 ===
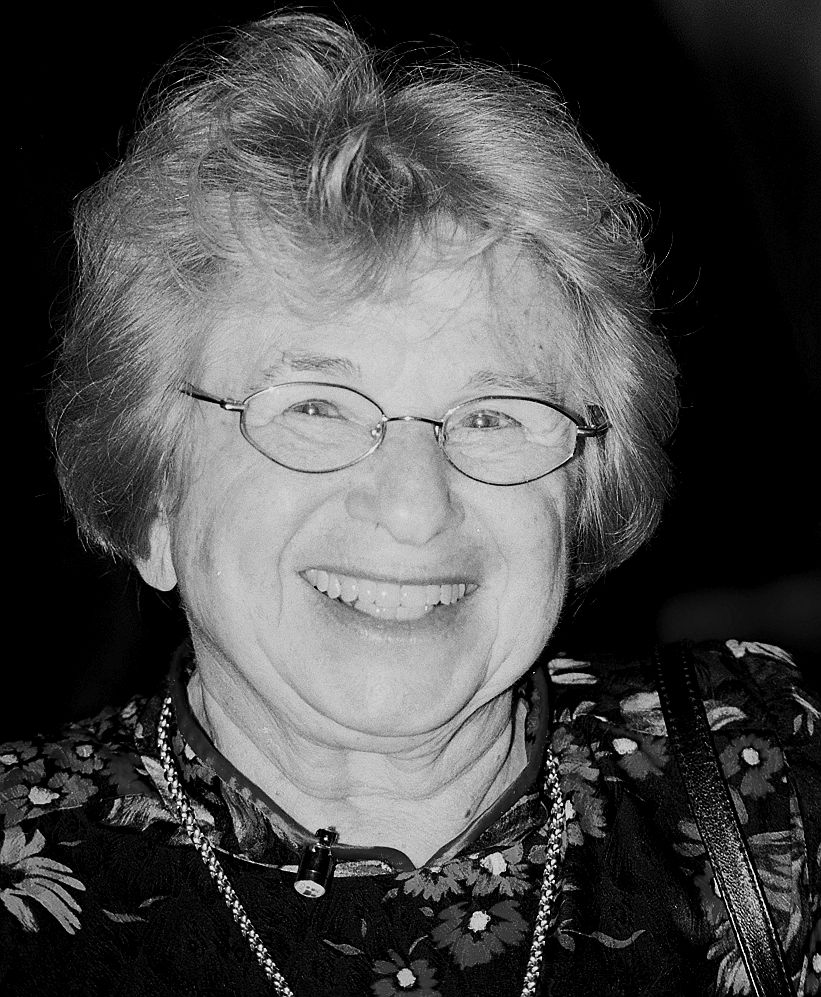
Westheimer in 1995

In 1990, Westheimer starred in an ABC sitcom pilot, Dr. Ruth's House, which aired as a one-time special in June of that year. ABC did not move forward in turning the pilot into a series.

In 1993, Westheimer and Israeli TV host Arad Nir hosted a talk show in Hebrew titled Min Tochnit, on the newly opened Israeli Channel 2. The show was similar to her U.S. Sexually Speaking show. The name of the show, Min Tochnit, is a play on words: literally "Kind of a program", but "Min" (מין) in Hebrew also means "sex" and "gender". 1993 and 1994 saw the publication of "Dr. Ruth's Good Sex Night-to-Night Calendar."

In 1994, she appeared in a computer game, an interactive CD-ROM adaptation of Dr. Ruth's Encyclopedia of Sex released for Windows and a Philips CD-i.

In 1995, she hosted a series of Playboy instructional videos entitled "Making Love". She also wrote a column distributed both nationally and internationally by the King Features Syndicate. In 1996, she co-authored Heavenly Sex, on Judaism and sex, in which she wrote: "The great rabbi Simeon ben-Halafta called the penis the great peacemaker of the home." She referred to the Book of Ruth as encouraging single women to initiate sex (providing the relationship leads to marriage), cited a Talmudic mandate that an unemployed man must make love to his wife every day, and mentioned the writings of a 12th-century rabbi who suggested that couples use different positions while having sex.

In 1992, she was a guest star on the television soap opera One Life to Live. She appeared as herself in "Dr. Ruth", a 1993 episode of the sci-fi drama series Quantum Leap. She appeared on the BBC radio show Desert Island Discs in 1990; on The Arsenio Hall Show once in 1990, once in 1991, once in 1993, and once in 1994; on The Howard Stern Show once in 1991; on Late Night with Conan O'Brien once in 1994, twice in 1995, three times in 1996, and once in 1997; on The Daily Show once in 1998; and was featured in a Celebrity Deathmatch episode in 1999.

Westheimer also appeared in several commercial advertisements, including a 1998 commercial for Clairol Herbal Essences shampoo and body wash, a 1991 Pepsi commercial (along with Annette Funicello, Frankie Avalon, Bo Jackson, and Gilbert Gottfried), and a 1994 Honda Prelude ad.

=== 2000–2009 ===
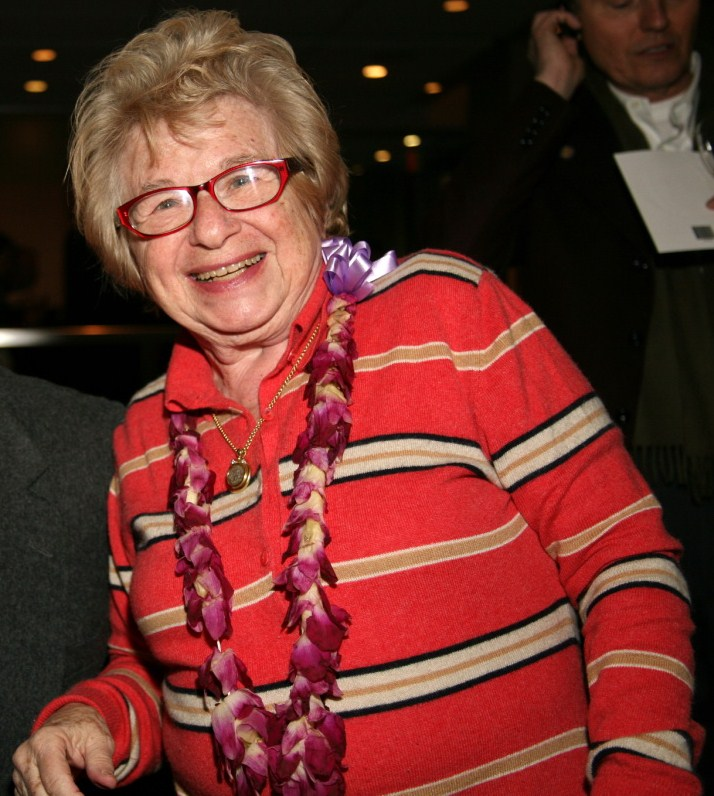
Ruth Westheimer in 2009

In 2000, she appeared on Grammy Award winner Tom Chapin's album This Pretty Planet, in the song "Two Kinds of Seagulls", in which she and Chapin sing in a duet of various animals that reproduce sexually. "It takes two to tingle" says the song. That year, she also made a TV commercial for Entenmann's Raspberry Danish Twist.

Between 2001 and 2007, Westheimer made regular appearances on the PBS children's television series Between the Lions as "Dr. Ruth Wordheimer" in a spoof of her therapist role, in which she helps anxious readers and spellers overcome their fear of long words. In 2002, she received a nomination for a Grammy Award for Best Spoken Word Album for Children, for Timeless Tales and Music of Our Time. In 2003–04, she made 10 appearances as a panelist on the game show Hollywood Squares.

In 2004, she made a guest appearance on Wait Wait... Don't Tell Me!, an NPR news panel game, and in 2007 she appeared on Live with Regis and Kelly. In January 2009, the 55th anniversary issue of Playboy magazine included Westheimer as #13 in a list of the 55 most important people in sex from the past 55 years. That year, Vanity Fair named her one of "12 women who changed the way we look at sex." She also appeared in the 2009 documentary Hugh Hefner: Playboy, Activist and Rebel.

=== 2010–2024 ===
In 2011, interior designer Nate Berkus hosted her on The Nate Berkus Show, after redoing the living room and dining room of her Manhattan apartment, in which she had lived for 50 years, to reduce clutter. She appeared as a guest on The Doctors in 2011 and 2012, on Joy Behar: Say Anything! in 2012, on Rachael Ray in 2013 and 2015, and on The Today Show in 2015 and 2019.

In 2018, she wrote three books. In 2019, she published her 45th book on sex and sexuality. On her 91st birthday, June 4, 2019, Westheimer appeared as a guest on The Ellen DeGeneres Show, and she visited Ellen's show again in November 2019, taking questions from the audience, and was also a guest in November 2020. In 2019, she was a guest on Late Night with Seth Meyers, The View, The Today Show, and twice on Strahan, Sara and Keke. She also had over 100,000 followers on Twitter.

Speaking of the Holocaust in 2021, Westheimer said: "We must keep saying to the young people, 'Think of these words — never again! Never again!' All of this must never happen again."

== Speeches and ethnography ==
Westheimer delivered commencement speeches at the Hebrew Union College seminary, Lehman College of the City University of New York and, in 2004, at Trinity College, where she was awarded honorary degrees. She also was the guest speaker at the Bronx High School of Science in New York in commemoration of Yom HaShoah 2008.

Westheimer was an accomplished ethnographer. Her studies in this field included the Ethiopian Jews, Papua New Guinea's Trobriand Islanders, and the Druze, a sect originating from Shia Islam now residing in Israel, Syria, and Lebanon. The latter were the subjects of her 2007 PBS documentary The Olive and the Tree: The Secret Strength of the Druze, and a book of the same title. She was also the Executive Producer for PBS documentaries Surviving Salvation and No Missing Link, Shifting Sands: Bedouin Women at the Crossroads, and The Unknown Face of Islam (on the Circassians).

Westheimer was a board member of the Museum of Jewish Heritage in Lower Manhattan in New York City.

== Play and documentary ==
When I was looking for a job in the United States I was told to take speech lessons, but they were a dollar an hour—too expensive. Now, Debra Jo Rupp [who plays me in Becoming Dr. Ruth] had to take speech coaching to learn my accent! It's good to be Dr. Ruth!

— Ruth Westheimer

In October 2013 the one-woman play Becoming Dr. Ruth, written by Mark St. Germain and directed by Julianne Boyd and set in 1997, opened Off Broadway at the Westside Theatre. Actress Debra Jo Rupp played the role of Dr. Ruth. The play showcased the sex therapist's life from fleeing the Nazis in the Kindertransport and joining the Haganah in Jerusalem as a scout and sniper, to her struggles to succeed as a single mother coming to the United States. Eileen DeSandre played Dr. Ruth in the Virginia Repertory Theatre production of Becoming Dr. Ruth. In 2021, actress Tovah Feldshuh played Dr. Ruth.

In 2019, the documentary Ask Dr. Ruth directed by Ryan White was in theaters, and was made available on Hulu, as she approached her 90th birthday. it won a 4th Critics' Choice Documentary Award in 2019 as "Most Compelling Living Subject of a Documentary," and was a 19th AARP Movies for Grownups Awards nominee in 2019 for "Best Documentary." Having previously avoided discussing her early years and how the Holocaust affected her family and herself, Westheimer believed that current events made it necessary for her to "stand up and be counted". She said that seeing child refugees being separated from their parents upset her, because her own story was reflected in what they were going through.

== Accolades ==
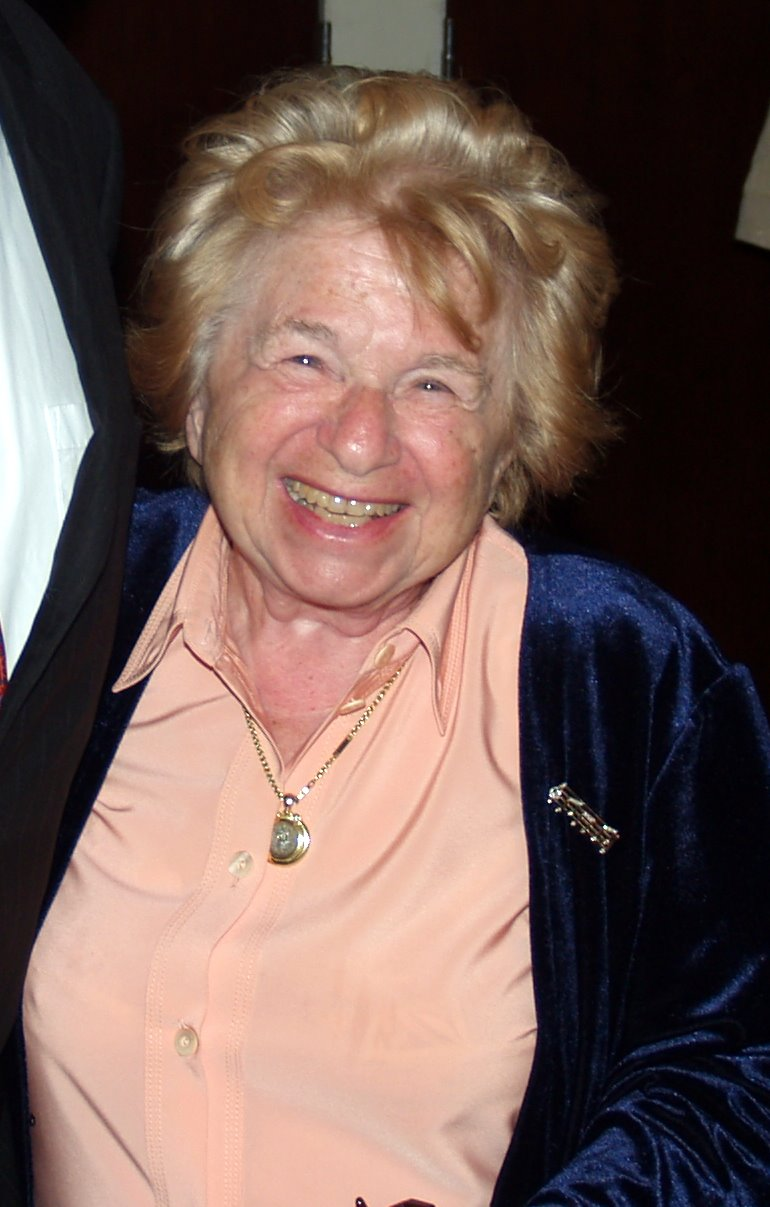
Westheimer in 2008

Some time before 1983, Westheimer was made a non-physician Fellow of the New York Academy of Medicine.

In 2008, Westheimer's name was added to the Bronx Walk of Fame (as the first "Honorary Bronxite," chosen for contributions to the life of the borough). In 2010 she was made a member of the Women in Technology International Hall of Fame. In 2017 she was inducted into the German-American Hall of Fame. In 2019, she was inducted into the Radio Hall of Fame.

Westheimer was named 1983 Jewish Woman of Achievement by a consortium of organizations connected with the Federation of Jewish Philanthropies in New York, received the 1986 Mayor's Liberty Award from New York City Mayor Ed Koch, and was given the 1987 Motion Picture Theater Bookers Association Star of Tomorrow Award. Her show The All New Dr. Ruth Show won a 1988 Ace Award, and was awarded the 1994 Magnus Hirschfeld Medal and the 1995 American Academy of Clinical Sexology Medal of Sexology. In 2002, she received the Ellis Island Medal of Honor, as well as the Leo Baeck Medal for her humanitarian work promoting tolerance and social justice, in 2006 the Columbia University Teacher's College Medal For Distinguished Services, in 2012 the National Alliance on Mental Illness Yale Mental Health Research Advocacy Award, in 2013 the Planned Parenthood Margaret Sanger Award, and in 2019 the Order of Merit of the Federal Republic of Germany and the James Parks Morton Interfaith Award. The Library of Congress acquired her papers in 2022.

In 2000 Westheimer received an honorary doctorate from Hebrew Union College, in 2001 an honorary Doctor of Humane Letters degree from Lehman College, in 2008 an honorary doctorate from Westfield State University, in 2014 an honorary Doctor of Humanities degree from Trinity College in Connecticut, and in 2019 an honorary doctorate from Ben Gurion University of the Negev (she remarked: "I wish I had met Ben Gurion. He was short.").

== Personal life and death ==
Westheimer was married three times, the first time to Israeli soldier and medical student David Bar-Heim for five years, and the second time briefly to Dan Bommer, with whom she had her daughter, Miriam, who later took the last name of her stepfather. She said each of her marriages played an important role in her relationship advice, but after two divorces it was her third marriage, at age 32 to Holocaust survivor Manfred 'Fred' Westheimer, that was the "real marriage". She met Fred on a ski tow in the Catskills. Fred, too, had escaped Nazi Germany. When Diane Sawyer, interviewing the couple for the TV show 60 Minutes asked her husband about their sex life, he answered, "The shoemaker's children have no shoes." Their marriage lasted 36 years, until his death in 1997.

She had two children: Dr. Miriam Yael Westheimer, an educator, author, and chief program officer of HIPPY International, which develops early childhood education and literacy programs, and who lived in Israel for six years and later married Joel Henry Einleger, and Joel Westheimer, a professor at the University of Ottawa; she had four grandchildren. She said: "I was so short – 4 feet 7 inches – that I couldn't believe that anything could grow inside of me."

Westheimer spoke English, German, French, and Hebrew.

In December 2014, Westheimer was a guest at a wedding in the Bronx. The groom, Rabbi Benjamin Goldschmidt, was the great-grandson of the woman who had helped rescue Westheimer from Nazi Germany.

Among her concerns in the 21st century was loneliness of people. In 2023, Gov. Kathy Hochul of New York appointed Westheimer as the inaugural "Loneliness Ambassador".

In her final years, Westheimer lived in the cluttered three-bedroom apartment on 190th Street "in Washington Heights where she raised her two children and became famous, in that order". She stayed there, she said in 1995, to be near the two synagogues of which she was a member (one of which is the Reform synagogue the Hebrew Tabernacle Congregation of Washington Heights, and the other of which is Conservative Synagogue Adath Israel of Riverdale; she was also a member of the Orthodox synagogue Ohav Shalom until it closed), the YMHA of Washington Heights and Inwood of which she was president for 11 years, and a "still sizable community of German Jewish World War II refugees". She explained: "Because of my experience with the Holocaust, I don't like to lose friends."

Westheimer died at her home in Manhattan on July 12, 2024, at the age of 96.

== Publications ==
- Westheimer, Ruth K. (1983). Dr.Ruth's Guide to Good Sex. New York: Warner Books. ISBN 978-0-446-51260-2.
- Westheimer, Ruth K.; Kravetz, Nathan (1985). First Love: A Young People's Guide to Sexual Information. New York: Warner Books. ISBN 978-0-446-34092-2.
- Westheimer, Ruth K. (1986). Dr. Ruth's Guide for Married Lovers. New York: Warner Books. ISBN 978-0-446-51282-4.
- Westheimer, Ruth K. (1987). Dr. Ruth's Guide to Good Sex. London: W.H. Allen/Virgin Books. ISBN 978-0-491-03377-0.
- Westheimer, Ruth K. (1988). All in a Lifetime: An Autobiography. New York: Grand Central Publishing. ISBN 978-0-446-34774-7.
- Westheimer, Ruth K.; Lieberman, Louis (1988). Sex and Morality: Who Is Teaching Our Sex Standards. San Diego, Cal.: Harcourt. ISBN 978-0-15-181390-2.
- Westheimer, Ruth K.; Lieberman, Louis (1992). Dr. Ruth's Guide to Erotic and Sensuous Pleasures. New York: S.P.I. Books. ISBN 978-1-56171-035-5.
- Westheimer, Ruth K. (1992). Dr Ruth's Guide to Safer Sex. London: Boxtree. ISBN 978-1-85283-430-2.
- Westheimer, Ruth K. (1993). Dr. Ruth Talks to Kids. New York: Simon & Schuster Children's Publishing. ISBN 978-0-02-792532-6.
- Westheimer, Ruth K. (1994). Dr. Ruth's Encyclopedia of Sex. New York: Continuum Int'l Publishing Group. ISBN 978-0-8264-0625-5.
- Westheimer, Ruth K. (1995). Sex For Dummies. Boston: IDG Books. ISBN 9781568843841.
- Westheimer, Ruth K.; Mark, Jonathan (1996). Heavenly Sex: Sexuality in the Jewish Tradition. New York: Bloomsbury Academic. ISBN 978-0-8264-0904-1.
- Westheimer, Ruth K.; Yagoda, Ben (1997). The Value of Family: A Blueprint for the 21st Century. New York: Grand Central Publishing. ISBN 978-0-446-67336-5.
- Westheimer, Ruth K; Kaplan, Steven (1998). Grandparenthood (1st ed.). Abingdon-on-Thames, UK: Routledge. ISBN 978-0-415-91948-7.
- Westheimer, Ruth K. (2000). The Art of Arousal: A Celebration of Erotic Art Throughout History. Lanham, Maryland: Madison Books. ISBN 978-1-56833-167-6.
- Westheimer, Ruth K. (2000). Dr. Ruth's Guide to College Life: The Savvy Student's Handbook. Lanham, Maryland: Madison Books. ISBN 978-1-56833-171-3.
- Westheimer, Ruth K. (2000). Encyclopedia of Sex (2nd ed.). New York: Bloomsbury Academic. ISBN 978-0-8264-1240-9.
- Westheimer, Ruth K. (2000). Sex For Dummies (Miniature Editions for Dummies). Philadelphia: Running Press. ISBN 978-0-7624-0750-7.
- Westheimer, Ruth K. (2001). All in a Lifetime: An Autobiography. New York: Grand Central Publishing. ISBN 978-0-446-67761-5.
- Westheimer, Ruth K.; Allen, Joy (2001). Dr. Ruth: Grandma on Wheels. New York: Little Golden Books. ISBN 978-0-307-98239-1.
- Westheimer, Ruth K.; Pearson, Tracey Campbell; Lehu, Pierre A. (2001). Dr. Ruth Talks About Grandparents: Advice for Kids on Making the Most of a Special Relationship. New York: Madison Books. ISBN 978-1-56833-180-5.
- Westheimer, Ruth K.; Kaplan, Steven (2001). Power: The Ultimate Aphrodisiac. Lanham, Maryland: Madison Books. ISBN 978-1-56833-230-7.
- Westheimer, Ruth K. (2001). Rekindling Romance for Dummies – Conversation Cards. Canoga Park, Cal.: Hungry Mind, Inc. ISBN 978-1-890760-53-3.
- Westheimer, Ruth K. (2001). Romance For Dummies (Miniature Editions). Philadelphia: Running Press. ISBN 978-0-7624-1244-0.
- Westheimer, Ruth K. (2001). Who Am I? Where Did I Come From?. New York: Golden Books. ISBN 978-0-307-10618-6.
- Westheimer, Ruth K.; Leh, Pierre A. (2003). Conquering the Rapids of Life: Making the Most of Midlife Opportunities. Lanham, Maryland: Taylor Trade Publishing. ISBN 978-1-58979-012-4.
- Westheimer, Ruth K. (2003). Musically Speaking: A Life Through Song (Personal Takes). Philadelphia: University of Pennsylvania Press. ISBN 978-0-8122-3746-7.
- Westheimer, Ruth K. (2004). 52 Lessons on Communicating Love: Tips, Anecdotes, and Advice for Connecting with the One You Love from America's Leading Relationship Therapist. Boulder, Colorado: Blue Mountain Arts. ISBN 978-0-88396-696-9.
- Westheimer, Ruth K. (2004). Dr. Ruth's Guide to Talking About Herpes. New York: Grove Press. ISBN 978-0-8021-4120-0.
- Westheimer, Ruth K.; Lopater, Sanford (2004). Human Sexuality: A Psychosocial Perspective (2nd ed.). Philadelphia: Lippincott, Williams & Wilkins. ISBN 978-0-7817-6076-8.
- Westheimer, Ruth K. (2004). Le sexe pour les nuls (French ed.). Paris: First; Pour Les Nuls Poche. ISBN 978-2876919563.
- Westheimer, Ruth K. (2005). Dr. Ruth's Sex After 50: Revving Up the Romance, Passion & ExCitement!. Fresno, Cal.: Quill Driver Books. ISBN 978-1-884956-43-0.
- Westheimer, Ruth K.; Leh, Pierre A. (2005). 52 lecciones para comunicar amor : sugerencias, poesía y consejos para conectarse con el ser amado. Translated by María de la Luz Broissin Fernández (Spanish ed.). Selector, México: Selector. ISBN 978-9706438317.
- Westheimer, Ruth; Sedan, Gil (2007). The Olive and the Tree: The Secret Strength of the Druze. New York: Lantern Books. ISBN 978-1-59056-102-7.
- Westheimer, Ruth K. (2008). Dr. Ruth's Guide to Teens and Sex Today: From Social Networking to Friends with Benefits. New York: Teachers College Press. ISBN 978-0-8077-4905-0.
- Westheimer, Ruth K.; Singerman, Jerome E. (2010). Mythen der Liebe (German ed.). Munich: Collection Rolf Heyne. ISBN 978-3-89910-470-7.
- Westheimer, Dr. Ruth K.; Grunebaum, Amos (M.D.); Lehu, Pierre A. (2011). Sexually Speaking: What Every Woman Needs to Know about Sexual Health. Hoboken, New Jersey: John Wiley & Sons. ISBN 978-0-470-64335-8. OCLC 731913202.
- Westheimer, Ruth K.; Lehu, Pierre A. (2012). Dr Ruth's Guide for the Alzheimer's Caregiver: How to Care for Your Loved One Without Getting Overwhelmed... and Without Doing It All Yourself. Fresno, California: Quill Driver Books. ISBN 978-1-61035-135-5.
- Westheimer, Ruth K.; Kaplan, Steven (2013). Surviving Salvation: The Ethiopian Jewish Family in Transition (Kindle ed.). Sanger, Cal.: The Write Thought, Inc. ASIN B00CYP81YG.
- Westheimer, Dr. Ruth K.; Lehu, Pierre A. (2015). The Doctor Is In: Dr. Ruth on Love, Life, and Joie de Vivre. New York: Amazon Publishing. ISBN 978-1-4778-2960-8. OCLC 909806839.
- Westheimer, Ruth K.; Lehu, Pierre A. (2015). Lebe mit Lust und Liebe: Meine Ratschläge für ein erfülltes Leben (German ed.). Freiburg, Germany: Verlag Herder. ISBN 978-3-451-34818-1.
- Westheimer, Ruth K.; Lehu, Pierre A. (2018). Roller Coaster Grandma: The Amazing Story of Dr. Ruth. Springfield, New Jersey: Apples & Honey Press. ISBN 978-1-68115-532-6.
- Westheimer, Ruth K.; Lehu, Pierre A.; Gilbert, Allison (2024). The Joy of Connections: 100 Ways to Beat Loneliness and Live a Happier and More Meaningful Life. New York: Rodale Books. ISBN 978-0-59373-622-7.

== Filmography ==
- Electric Dreams (1984); science fiction romantic comedy; cast as herself as talk show host
- Une Femme ou Deux (One Woman or Two) (1985); comedy romance starring Gérard Depardieu and Sigourney Weaver; cast as Mrs. Heffner
- Forever, Lulu (1987); comedy mystery starring Hanna Schygulla, Deborah Harry, and Alec Baldwin; cast as herself
- Quantum Leap (TV, 1993) "Dr. Ruth" (episode 87); science fiction; cast as herself
- The Emperor's New Clothes: An All-Star Illustrated Retelling of the Classic Fairy Tale (1998); cast as the Imperial Physician (voice)
- The History of Sex (1999); documentary, interviews
- Between the Lions (2000); children's program; cast as Dr. Ruth Wordheimer
- Inside Deep Throat (2005); documentary about the pornographic film Deep Throat, and its effects on American society; as herself
- Lipshitz Saves the World (2007); comedy starring Leslie Nielsen; cast as herself
- Ask Dr. Ruth (2019; Sundance Film Festival); documentary directed by Ryan White follows Westheimer as she reflects on her life and career
