= Ma'alul =

Ma'alul معلول Ma'lul, Maalul, Maaloul, Mahlul
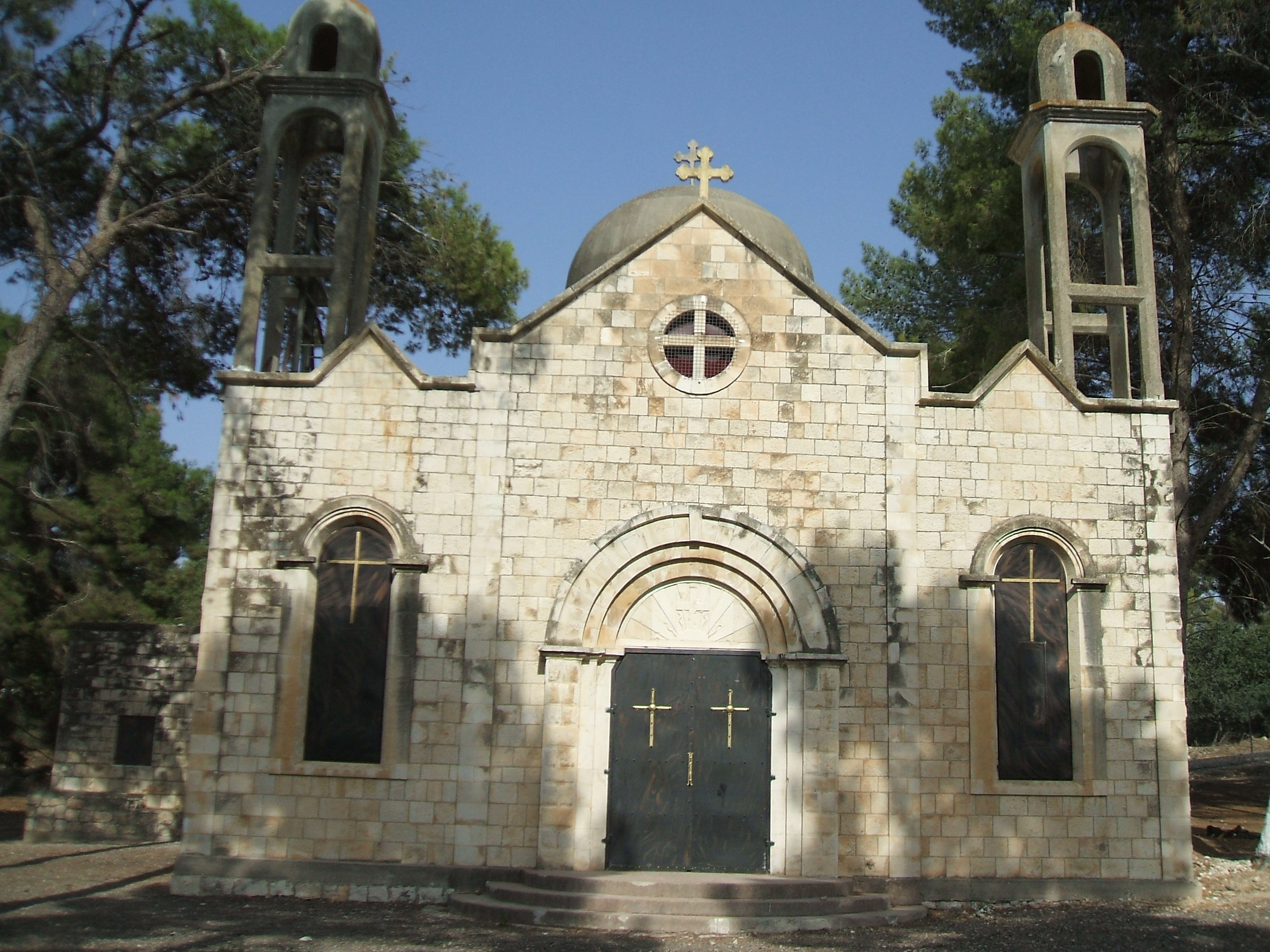
- A restored Catholic Church of Ma'alul in July 2010
- Etymology: from personal name
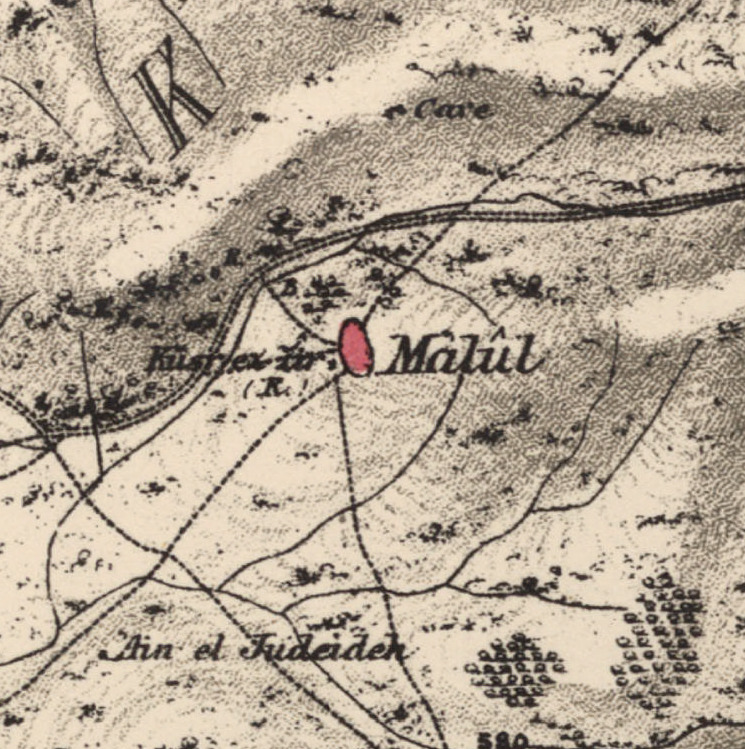
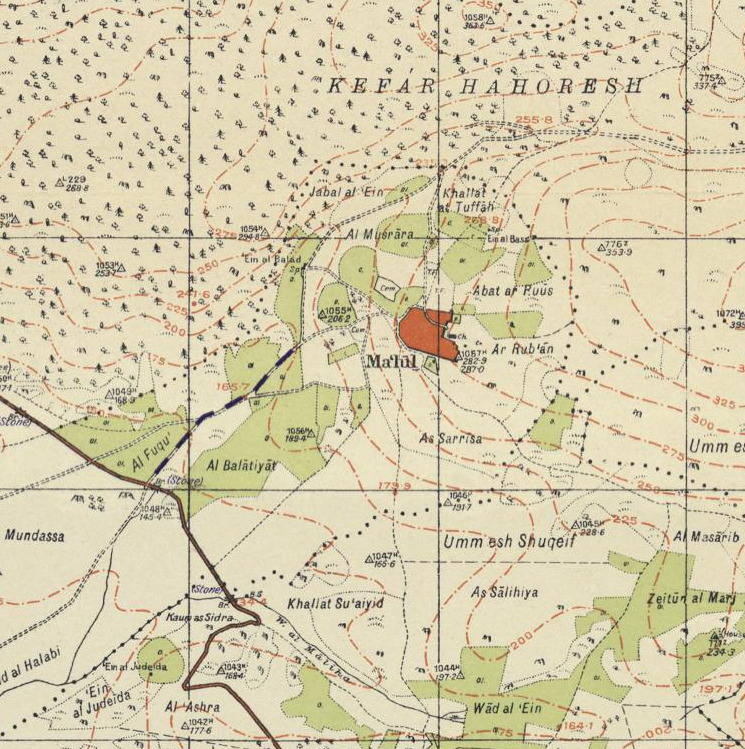
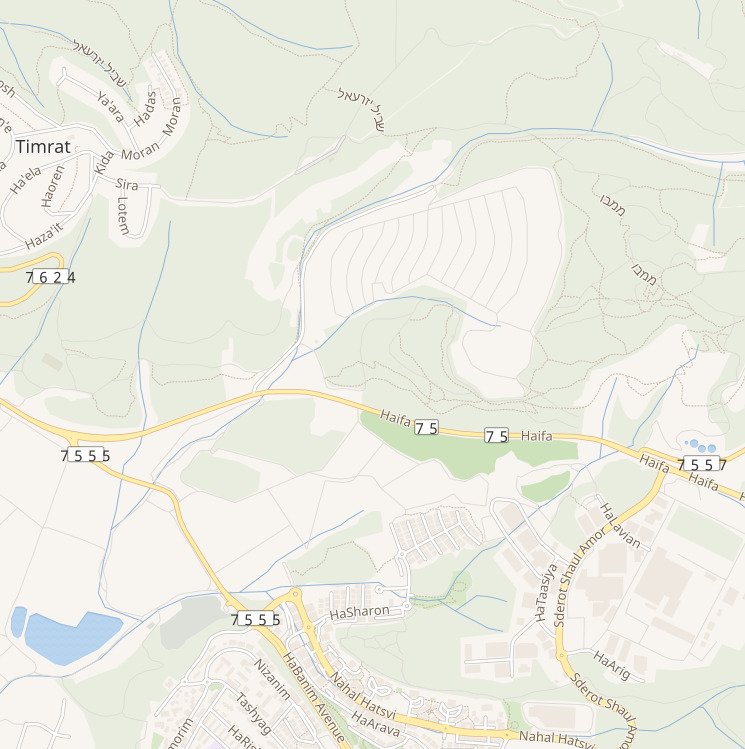
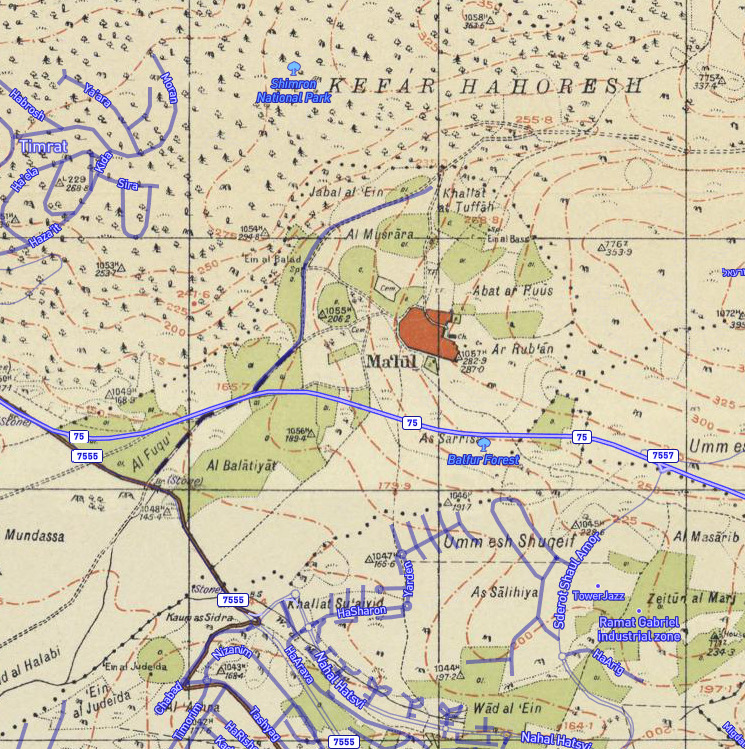
- 1870s map 1940s map modern map 1940s with modern overlay map A series of historical maps of the area around Ma'alul (click the buttons)

- Location within Mandatory Palestine
- Coordinates: 32°41′44″N 35°14′22″E
- Palestine grid: 172/233
- Geopolitical entity: Mandatory Palestine
- Subdistrict: Nazareth
- Date of depopulation: 15 July 1948

Area
  - Total: 4,698 dunams (4.698 km^{2}; 1.814 sq mi)

Population (1945)
  - Total: 690
- Cause(s) of depopulation: Military assault by Yishuv forces
- Current Localities: Migdal HaEmek, Kfar HaHoresh, Timrat, and an Israeli military base

Ma'alul (Arabic: معلول) was a Palestinian village, with a mixed population of primarily Muslims with a substantial minority of Palestinian Christians, that was depopulated and destroyed by Israel during the 1948 Arab-Israeli war. Located six kilometers west of the city of Nazareth, many of its inhabitants became internally displaced refugees, after taking refuge in Nazareth and the neighbouring town of Yafa an-Naseriyye. Despite having never left the territory that came to form part of Israel, the majority of the villagers of Ma'alul, and other Palestinian villages like Indur and al-Mujaydil, were declared "absentees", allowing the confiscation of their land under the Absentees Property Law.

Today, much of the former village's lands are owned by the Jewish National Fund. All that remains of its former structures are two churches, a mosque and a Roman-era mausoleum, known locally as Qasr al-Dayr ("castle of the monastery").

== History ==
In 1850, Rabbi Joseph Schwartz identified Ma'alul with the Biblical town of Nahalal.

=== Ottoman period ===
Incorporated into the Ottoman Empire in 1517, Ma'alul appeared in the census of 1596, located in the nahiya (subdistrict) of Tiberias under the liwa' (district) of Safad with a population of seventy-seven. It paid taxes on a number of crops, including wheat and barley, as well as goats and beehives.

Ma'alul, and the neighbouring towns and villages of Nazareth, Mejdal, Yafa, Jebatha and Kneffis paid taxes to the monks of Nazareth, who bought the right to collect these taxes from the Ottoman authorities in 1777 for two hundred dollars. Thirty years later, they again purchased this right, though this time for two thousands five hundred dollars, owing to the rise in the price of cereals and ground rents. Pierre Jacotin called the village Matoun on his map from 1799.

In 1859 the population was estimated to be 280, who cultivated 42 faddans of land. In 1875 Victor Guérin found Ma'alul to have 350 inhabitants; all Muslim except about 30 Greek Orthodox Christians. By the late nineteenth century, the village was made of adobe bricks, built on a hill, Just outside the village was a magnificent Roman mausoleum, called Qasr al-Dayr. A population list from about 1887 showed that Ma'lul had about 650 inhabitants, all Muslims.

=== British Mandate period ===
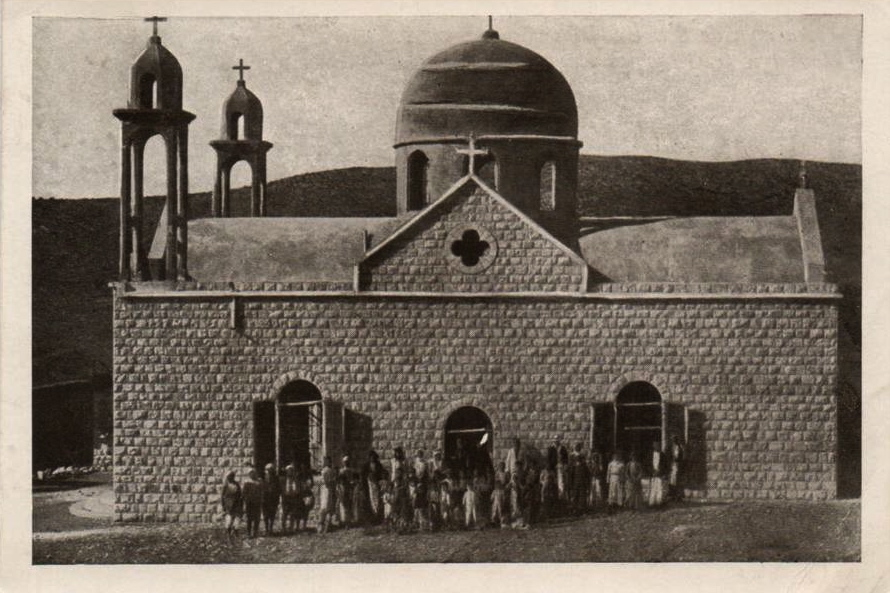
Ma'alul church, in the 1930s

At the beginning of the twentieth century, the people of Ma'alul were tenants of the Sursuq family of Beirut, absentee landlords who had acquired the village lands earlier. In 1921 the Sursuqs sold all but 2,000 dunams of Ma'alul's land to the Zionist Palestine Land Development Company. Zionist pioneers founded the moshav of Nahalal on that land the same year. The remaining 2,000 dunums were insufficient to support the village's population, so at the request of the Mandate government, the company agreed to lease an additional 3,000 dunams to the villagers until 1927. The villagers had the option to buy this land before the lease expired.

According to the British Mandate's 1922 census of Palestine, Ma'alul had 436 inhabitants; 186 Muslims and 250 Christians, where all the Christians were Orthodox. By the 1931 census the population had decreased to 390; 228 Muslims, and 162 Christians, in a total of 90 houses. In the 1945 statistics the population of Ma'alul was 690; 490 Muslims and 200 Christians, with a total of 4,698 dunams of land, according to an official land and population survey. Of this, a total of 650 dunams were for plantations and irrigable land, 3,462 for cereals, while 29 dunams were built-up land.

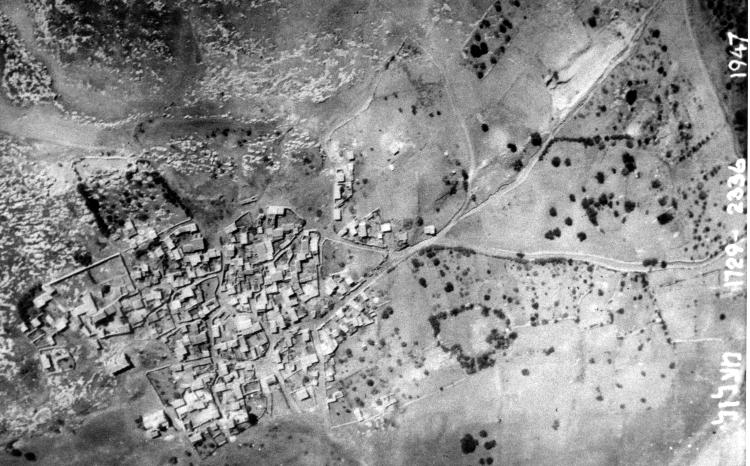
Ma’alul 1947. Photograph from Palmach archives.

=== 1948, and aftermath ===
The village was captured by the Israeli army on 15 July 1948 during Operation Dekel. The villagers were forced to leave and the houses destroyed.

In 1949 an Israeli military base was built on village land.

Walid Khalidi describes the remains of Ma'alul in 1992:

The village site is now covered with a pine forest planted by the Jewish National Fund and dedicated to the memory of prominent Jews and some non-Jewish Americans and Europeans. A military base is also on the site. The mosque and two churches still stand, and are used intermittently as cow sheds by the residents of Kibbutz Kefar ha-Choresh. Overlooking Wadi al-Halabi, between the village site and the site of al-Mujaydil, is an Israeli plastics factory. Cactus, olive trees, and fig trees grow on the site, which is strewn with piles of stones. A few tombs in the Muslim cemetery across from the mosque can be seen. The main village site also contains the remains of houses.

== Documentary: Ma'loul Celebrates its Destruction ==
Ma'alul was the object of the 1985 documentary film by Michel Khleifi; Ma'loul Celebrates its Destruction.

== Bibliography ==
- Barron, J. B., ed. (1923). Palestine: Report and General Abstracts of the Census of 1922. Government of Palestine.
- Conder, C.R.; Kitchener, H.H. (1881). The Survey of Western Palestine: Memoirs of the Topography, Orography, Hydrography, and Archaeology. Vol. 1. London: Committee of the Palestine Exploration Fund.
- Department of Statistics (1945). Village Statistics, April, 1945. Government of Palestine.
- De Haas, J. (1934). History of Palestine - The Last Two Thousand Years. Macmillan.
- Guérin, V. (1880). Description Géographique Historique et Archéologique de la Palestine (in French). Vol. 3: Galilee, pt. 1. Paris: L'Imprimerie Nationale.
- Hadawi, S. (1970). Village Statistics of 1945: A Classification of Land and Area ownership in Palestine. Palestine Liberation Organization Research Center.
- Hütteroth, W.-D.; Abdulfattah, K. (1977). Historical Geography of Palestine, Transjordan and Southern Syria in the Late 16th Century. Erlanger Geographische Arbeiten, Sonderband 5. Erlangen, Germany: Vorstand der Fränkischen Geographischen Gesellschaft. ISBN 3-920405-41-2.
- Karmon, Y. (1960). "An Analysis of Jacotin's Map of Palestine" (PDF). Israel Exploration Journal. 10 (3, 4): 155–173, 244–253. Archived from the original (PDF) on 2019-12-22.
- Keil, C.F. (1865). Joshua, Judges, Ruth, tr. by J. Martin. Oxford University.
- Khalidi, W. (1992). All That Remains: The Palestinian Villages Occupied and Depopulated by Israel in 1948. Washington D.C.: Institute for Palestine Studies. ISBN 0-88728-224-5.
- Mills, E., ed. (1932). Census of Palestine 1931. Population of Villages, Towns and Administrative Areas. Jerusalem: Government of Palestine.
- Morris, B. (2004). The Birth of the Palestinian Refugee Problem Revisited. Cambridge University Press. ISBN 978-0-521-00967-6.
- Palmer, E. H. (1881). The Survey of Western Palestine: Arabic and English Name Lists Collected During the Survey by Lieutenants Conder and Kitchener, R. E. Transliterated and Explained by E.H. Palmer. Committee of the Palestine Exploration Fund.
- Pappé, I. (2006). The Ethnic Cleansing of Palestine. London and New York: Oneworld. ISBN 1-85168-467-0.
- Rabinowitz, Dan (1997). Overlooking Nazareth: The Ethnography of Exclusion in Galilee. Cambridge University Press. ISBN 0-521-56495-6.
- Rhode, H. (1979). Administration and Population of the Sancak of Safed in the Sixteenth Century. Columbia University. Archived from the original on 2020-03-01.
- Schumacher, G. (1888). "Population list of the Liwa of Akka". Quarterly Statement - Palestine Exploration Fund. 20: 169–191.
- Schwarz, Joseph (1850). A Descriptive Geography and Brief Historical Sketch of Palestine. Translated by Isaac Leeser. Macmillan.
