= List of The Tonight Show Starring Johnny Carson episodes (1984) =

Episodes in 1984

- No. of episodes: 190

Release
- Original network: NBC

Season chronology
- ← Previous; 1983 episodes Next → 1985 episodes

The following is a list of episodes of the television series The Tonight Show Starring Johnny Carson which aired in 1984. In October, 1962 Johnny Carson took over as host of the show from the previous host Jack Paar.

== 1984 ==
=== January ===
No.	Original release date	Guest(s)	Musical/entertainment guest(s)
5,091	January 3, 1984	Martin Mull, Stephanie Zimbalist, Jane Goodall	N/A
Desk- "Blue Cards"
5,092	January 4, 1984	Dabney Coleman, Paul Rodriguez	Lee Greenwood
Desk- "Rule of Thumb"
5,093	January 5, 1984	Cybill Shepherd, Dennis Wolfberg, Bill Irwin	N/A
Stump the Band
5,094	January 6, 1984	Bert Convy, Estelle Parsons	Ernie Watts, Pete Christlieb
Edge of Wetness
5,095	January 10, 1984	Lyle Alzado, Dinah Manoff	Jim Stafford
Desk- "Fan Mail"
5,096	January 11, 1984	William F. Buckley, Jr.	Itzhak Perlman
Desk- "Calendar: Boys of the Band"
5,097	January 12, 1984	Howie Mandel, Susan Sullivan	Steve Lawrence
Desk- "Superstitions"
5,098	January 13, 1984	Susan Sarandon, Charles Nelson Reilly, Carol Wayne, Brooke Shields	N/A
Desk- "Football Nicknames"; Tea-Time Movie
5,099	January 16, 1984	Joan Rivers (guest host), Don Rickles, Pierce Brosnan	Rita Moreno
5,100	January 17, 1984	Joan Rivers (guest host), Pee Wee Herman, Gene Hackman, Debbie Reynolds	N/A
5,101	January 18, 1984	Joan Rivers (guest host), James Coco, Charlton Heston, Joel Higgins	Sheena Easton ("Hard To Say It's Over")
5,102	January 19, 1984	Joan Rivers (guest host), Bill Cosby, Dr. Ruth Westheimer, Angie Dickinson	N/A
5,103	January 20, 1984	Joan Rivers (guest host), Marlo Thomas, Garry Shandling	Betty Buckley
5,104	January 31, 1984	George Carlin, Linda Rondstadt, Loni Anderson	Linda Hopkins
Desk- "Carson Clearinghouse Sweepstakes"

=== February ===
No.	Original release date	Guest(s)	Musical/entertainment guest(s)
5,105	February 1, 1984	Bobby Kelton	Byron Janis (Waltz in A minor, The Banjo), Tom Jones
Desk- "Fan Mail"
5,106	February 2, 1984	Charles Nelson Reilly, Holly Palance	George Jones, Ray Charles
5,107	February 3, 1984	Michael Landon, Loni Anderson, Ronn Lucas	Air Supply
Mighty Carson Art Players- "President Reagan's Re-Election Speech"
5,108	February 7, 1984	Harry Anderson, Jim Fowler, Teri Garr, Pete Barbutti	Michael Martin Murphey
Desk- "Uses For the Cabbage Patch Kid"
5,109	February 8, 1984	Peter Strauss, Blake Clark, Kelly McGillis	N/A
Stump the Band
5,110	February 9, 1984	Lee Van Cleef, Claudia Lonow	Tony Bennett
Edge of Wetness
5,111	February 10, 1984	Dudley Moore, Ronnie Shakes, Dinah Manoff	N/A
Sketch- "G. Walter Schneer- Telephone Company Spokesperson"
5,112	February 14, 1984	Calvin Trillin	Eydie Gormé
Desk- "Blue Cards"
5,113	February 15, 1984	Sammy Davis, Jr., Joyce DeWitt	N/A
Desk- "Biff Barton Olympic Clip"
5,114	February 16, 1984	Dyan Cannon, Tom Selleck, Nick Apollo Forte	Dionne Warwick
5,115	February 17, 1984	Madeline Kahn	Tracey Ullman ("Move Over Darling" and "They Don't Know")
Desk- "Kiss a Star"
5,116	February 21, 1984	Mariette Hartley, Alice Neel, Bill Johnson	N/A
5,117	February 22, 1984	Ann-Margret, Dom DeLuise, Kelly Monteith	Sue Raney
Desk- "Movies That Didn't Get Nominated"
5,118	February 23, 1984	Joey Lawrence, Ed Begley, Jr., Suzanne Pleshette	Michael Davis
Desk- "The Man Who Polishes Johnny's Star on Hollywood Boulevard"; Desk- "News Teasers During the Sweeps Week"
5,119	February 24, 1984	David Steinberg, Rosalind Chao, Edwin Krupp	Linda Rondstadt
Sketch- "George Washington Interview"
5,120	February 28, 1984	Jim Fowler, Don Rickles	N/A
Desk- "Sweeps"; Stump the Band
5,121	February 29, 1984	Emmanuel Lewis, Estelle Parsons, Maureen Murphy	Wynton Marsalis
Dine & Dance With a Star

=== March ===
No.	Original release date	Guest(s)	Musical/entertainment guest(s)
5,122	March 1, 1984	Robert Klein	Cyndi Lauper ("Girls Just Want to Have Fun" and "Time After Time")
Desk- "Update of Television Shows"
5,123	March 2, 1984	John Ritter, Jimmy Aleck, Robyn Douglass	N/A
Desk- "Carson Caucus"
5,124	March 5, 1984	Joan Rivers (guest host), Tommy Tune, Cybill Shepherd	N/A
5,125	March 6, 1984	Joan Rivers (guest host), Elizabeth Ashley, Fred Grandy, Marilu Henner, Neil Simon	N/A
5,126	March 7, 1984	Joan Rivers (guest host), Michele Lee, Anthony Hopkins, Flip Wilson	Andy Williams
5,127	March 8, 1984	Joan Rivers (guest host), Tony Danza, Smothers Brothers	Martina Arroyo
5,128	March 9, 1984	Joan Rivers (guest host), Charles Nelson Reilly, Desi Arnaz, Jr.	N/A
5,129	March 13, 1984	Dean Martin, Paul Rodriguez, Merie Earle, Mickey Rooney	N/A
Desk- "Super Tuesday Predictions"
5,130	March 14, 1984	Bill Cosby	Dave Frishberg
Sketch- "Show Me Something, Turkey"
5,131	March 15, 1984	A. Whitney Brown, Bob Uecker, Peter Ueberroth	Oak Ridge Boys
Desk- "Public Service Announcements"
5,132	March 16, 1984	Susan Sullivan, Robert Gruenberg	King's Sisters
Desk- "St. Patrick's Day Toasts"
5,133	March 20, 1984	Amy Irving, Jerry Seinfeld, Fran Tate	N/A
Desk- "Fan Mail"
5,134	March 21, 1984	Jerry Lewis, Dabney Coleman, Pete Fountain	Doc Severinsen & the band play 'Happy-Go-Lucky Local' by Duke Ellington.
Carnac the Magnificent
5,135	March 22, 1984	Richard Benjamin, Estelle Reiner, Lance Burton	Maria Conchita Alonso, performing Acaríciame
Desk- "Rumors"
5,136	March 23, 1984	Mayor Ed Koch, Carl Reiner, Estelle Reiner	N/A
Desk- "Moron Movies"
5,137	March 27, 1984	Charles Grodin, Brad Garrett, Dr. John McCosker	N/A
Edge of Wetness
5,138	March 28, 1984	Steve Landesberg, The Segal Twins	Joe Williams
Desk- "Great Expectations Questionnaire"
5,139	March 29, 1984	Candice Bergen	Judith Blegen ("Chi il bel sogno di Doretta"), Pete Fountain
Desk- "Intelligence- Pigs vs. Horses"
5,140	March 30, 1984	Howie Mandel, George Segal	N/A
Desk- "Presidential Aides"

=== April ===
No.	Original release date	Guest(s)	Musical/entertainment guest(s)
5,141	April 3, 1984	Robin Williams	Phyllis Newman
Stump the Band
5,142	April 4, 1984	Tony Danza, Rosalind Chao	Jim Stafford
Desk- "Johnny Does His Taxes"
5,143	April 5, 1984	Angie Dickinson, Tony Danza, Ronnie Shakes	Betty Buckley ("Over You" and "Memory")
Desk- "Joke Rivalry Between Cities"
5,144	April 6, 1984	Teresa Ganzel, George Segal, David Letterman	Roberta Flack
Desk- "Presidential Candidates Appeal to Special Interest Groups"
5,145	April 16, 1984	Joan Rivers (guest host), Elizabeth Ashley	Kris Kristofferson
5,146	April 17, 1984	Joan Rivers (guest host), David Brenner, JoBeth Williams	N/A
5,147	April 18, 1984	Joan Rivers (guest host), David Steinberg, Steve Guttenberg	Loretta Lynn
5,148	April 19, 1984	Joan Rivers (guest host), Tom Hanks, Jamie Lee Curtis	N/A
5,149	April 20, 1984	Joan Rivers (guest host), Henry Winkler, Suzanne Somers	N/A
5,150	April 24, 1984	Martin Mull, Jerry Seinfeld, Scot Morris (Omni puzzles editor)	N/A
Desk- "Public Service Announcements"
5,151	April 25, 1984	Bob Newhart, Joe Garagiola	Deniece Williams
Desk- "National Secretaries' Day"
5,152	April 26, 1984	Joan Embery, Franklyn Ajaye, Ken Wahl	N/A
Desk- "Commie to California Phrase Book"
5,153	April 27, 1984	Richard Pryor, Todd Christensen	Laura Branigan ("Self Control" and "Will You Still Love Me Tomorrow?")
Band Number- "Salute to Basie"

=== May ===
No.	Original release date	Guest(s)	Musical/entertainment guest(s)
5,154	May 1, 1984	Father Guido Sarducci, Estelle Parsons	Ron McCroby
Desk- "Candidate Composites"
5,155	May 2, 1984	Jane Badler, A. Whitney Brown	Tom Jones
Desk- "How The Chinese Edited President Reagan"
5,156	May 3, 1984	Robert Blake, Rich Hall, Richard Guindon	N/A
Desk- "Springtime Cycle of Life in Washington, D.C."
5,157	May 4, 1984	Drew Barrymore, James Coco	Patti LaBelle ("Over the Rainbow")
Sketch- "Greengrocer Joe Cabbageoni"
5,158	May 8, 1984	Sharon Gless, Alan King	N/A
Desk- "How Do Dey Do Dat"
5,159	May 9, 1984	Cloris Leachman, Abel Kiviat	Patti LaBelle
Desk- "Mother's Day Phone Calls"
5,160	May 10, 1984	Bill Maher, Clio Goldsmith	Liberace
Desk- "Moron Movies"
5,161	May 11, 1984	Mariette Hartley, Calvin Trillin	The Funny Boys
Sketch- "Chernenko Phone Call"
5,162	May 15, 1984	Tony Randall, Steven Wright	Paul Marr
Desk- "Comical Gloves"
5,163	May 16, 1984	Pete Barbutti, Irving Cohen	Nadja Salerno-Sonnenberg
Edge of Wetness
5,164	May 17, 1984	Garry Shandling, Scot Morris (Omni puzzles editor)	Stephane Grappelli
Exercise Books- 'Johnny Carson's Exercise for Lazy Bums', National Exercise Week
5,165	May 18, 1984	Bert Convy, Shelley Long	Bob & Ray
Mighty Carson Art Players- "Evening News of 2004 with Zontar Rather"
5,166	May 22, 1984	Don Rickles, Mark McCollum, Kate Capshaw	N/A
Desk- "As The White House Turns"
5,167	May 23, 1984	Sammy Davis, Jr., Charles Nelson Reilly	N/A
Desk- "Johnny's John Time"
5,168	May 24, 1984	none	Michael Davis, John Denver
Carnac the Magnificent
5,169	May 25, 1984	David Steinberg	Leonard Waxdeck & The Birdcallers
5,170	May 28, 1984	Joan Rivers (guest host), Erma Bombeck, Shelley Winters, Michael J. Fox	N/A
5,171	May 29, 1984	Joan Rivers (guest host), Howie Mandel, Sarah Douglas	Engelbert Humperdinck
5,172	May 30, 1984	Joan Rivers (guest host), David Brenner, Ginger Rogers, Harvey Fierstein	N/A
5,173	May 31, 1984	Joan Rivers (guest host), Sally Kellerman, Diahann Carroll, Terry Moore (actress)	N/A

=== June ===
No.	Original release date	Guest(s)	Musical/entertainment guest(s)
5,174	June 1, 1984	Joan Rivers (guest host), John Davidson, Sid Caesar, Betty Thomas	N/A
5,175	June 5, 1984	Daniel Greenblatt (1984 Scripps National Spelling Bee champion), Joan Collins	N/A
Desk- "Election Returns"
5,176	June 6, 1984	Bill Murray, Dan Aykroyd, Bruce Mahler	Maria Conchita Alonso
Desk- "Public Service Announcements"
5,177	June 7, 1984	Thalassa Cruso	Johnny Mathis
Stump the Band; Desk- "Moron Movies"
5,178	June 8, 1984	Charles Grodin, Brad Garrett, Merie Earle	N/A
Desk- "International Symbol Signs"
5,179	June 12, 1984	Dick Cavett, Jimmy Brogan, Dave Barry	N/A
Desk- "Who's In Charge Here?"
5,180	June 13, 1984	Joan Embery, Wil Shriner, Mary Gross	N/A
Desk- "Blue Cards"
5,181	June 14, 1984	Bill Cosby, Arnold Schwarzenegger	N/A
5,182	June 15, 1984	Elmer Conrad	Dolly Parton ("Drinkenstein")
Shower With a Star
5,183	June 19, 1984	Elaine Stritch, Alice Neel	N/A
Desk- "Letters from Children"
5,184	June 20, 1984	Shelley Winters, Ronnie Shakes, Annie Potts	N/A
Edge of Wetness
5,185	June 21, 1984	George Carlin	Julio Iglesias ("To All the Girls I've Loved Before" and "Momentos")
Desk- "Items Used During Olympics"
5,186	June 22, 1984	Karla Tamburrelli	Steve Lawrence
Desk- "The Great Burbank Getaway Weekend"; Mighty Carson Art Players featuring Sabrina Houben, Ron Smith Lookalike- "Captain Stud"
5,187	June 25, 1984	Joan Rivers (guest host), David Brenner, Jamie Farr	Peggy Lee
5,188	June 26, 1984	Joan Rivers (guest host), Maureen Murphy, Dr. Ruth Westheimer	Hoyt Axton
5,189	June 27, 1984	Joan Rivers (guest host), Daniel J. Travanti, Garry Shandling	Lee Greenwood
Desk- "Blue Cards"
5,190	June 28, 1984	Joan Rivers (guest host), Bo Derek, Rob Lowe	The Beach Boys
5,191	June 29, 1984	Joan Rivers (guest host), Smothers Brothers	Grace Jones, Rita Moreno

=== July ===
No.	Original release date	Guest(s)	Musical/entertainment guest(s)
5,192	July 10, 1984	Gore Vidal, Susan Butcher	N/A
Desk- "Vacation Snapshots"
5,193	July 11, 1984	George Segal, Bob Uecker	Richard Stoltzman
Desk- "Mondale's Vice Presidential Candidates"
5,194	July 12, 1984	Miss Piggy, Howie Mandel, John E. McCosker	N/A
Desk- "Blue Cards"
5,195	July 13, 1984	David Letterman, Scot Morris (Omni puzzles editor)	Loudon Wainwright III
Sketch- "Interview with Olympic President"
5,196	July 23, 1984	Joan Rivers (guest host), Father Guido Sarducci, Susan Sullivan, Gallagher	N/A
5,197	July 24, 1984	Joan Rivers (guest host), Brooke Shields, Gallagher, Joan Van Ark	N/A
5,198	July 25, 1984	Joan Rivers (guest host), Erin Gray, Mayor Tom Bradley	N/A
5,199	July 26, 1984	Joan Rivers (guest host), Betty White, Michael Douglas	N/A

=== August ===
No.	Original release date	Guest(s)	Musical/entertainment guest(s)
5,200	August 6, 1984	Joan Rivers (guest host), Cloris Leachman, Gloria Steinem	N/A
5,201	August 7, 1984	Joan Rivers (guest host), Wil Shriner	The Go-Go's ("Head Over Heels” and “Yes or No”)
5,202	August 8, 1984	Joan Rivers (guest host), Elliott Gould, Mary Lou Retton	N/A
5,203	August 9, 1984	Joan Rivers (guest host), Charles Nelson Reilly, John Lithgow, Howie Mandel	N/A
5,204	August 10, 1984	Joan Rivers (guest host), Fred Grandy	Tammy Wynette
5,205	August 14, 1984	Suzanne Pleshette, Jerry Seinfeld	Martina Arroyo ("Ritorna vincitor!")
Desk- "Update on Television Shows Missed During the Olympics"
5,206	August 15, 1984	Buddy Hackett, Teresa Ganzel	Toni Tennille
Desk- "Public Service Announcements"
5,207	August 16, 1984	Michael Landon, Kevin Nealon	N/A
Desk- "Who's in Charge Here?"
5,208	August 17, 1984	David Steinberg, Judge Joseph Wapner	Bunny Briggs
Desk- "Famous Gaffes"
5,209	August 21, 1984	James Stewart	Barbara Mandrell
Desk- "Johnny Carson's Financial Disclosure"
5,210	August 23, 1984	Loretta Tupper, David Horowitz	N/A
Desk- "Blue Cards"
5,211	August 28, 1984	Jacqueline Bisset, Doug Henning	Joe Williams
Desk- "Presidential Poll and Other Questions"
5,212	August 29, 1984	Rosalind Chao, Joe Garagiola	Al Jarreau
Edge of Wetness
5,213	August 30, 1984	Julie Montgomery, Ritch Shydner	Roy Clark
New Products
5,214	August 31, 1984	Donald O'Connor, Steve Schaffer	N/A
Mighty Carson Art Players- "Presidential Reagan's Financial Disclosure"

=== September ===
No.	Original release date	Guest(s)	Musical/entertainment guest(s)
5,215	September 4, 1984	Steve Landesberg, Dave Barry	The Pointer Sisters
Carnac the Magnificent
5,216	September 5, 1984	Richard Libertini	Liberace
Desk- "Pilots That Didn't Make It"
5,217	September 6, 1984	Charles Grodin	Tony Bennett
Desk- "Differences Between Republicans and Democrats"
5,218	September 7, 1984	Bo Derek, Lonette McKee	American Ballet Comedy
Mighty Carson Art Players- "Show Me Something Turkey"
5,219	September 10, 1984	Joan Rivers (guest host), John Byner, Ted Danson	N/A
Desk- "Blue Cards"
5,220	September 11, 1984	Joan Rivers (guest host), Soleil Moon Frye, Kate Jackson, Billy Dee Williams, Selma Diamond	N/A
5,221	September 12, 1984	Joan Rivers (guest host), David Brenner, Dina Merrill	Elvis Costello ("I Hope You're Happy Now" & "Peace In Our Time")
5,222	September 13, 1984	Joan Rivers (guest host), Michael Landon, Garry Shandling, Lily Tomlin	N/A
5,223	September 14, 1984	Joan Rivers (guest host), George Burns	Peter Allen
5,224	September 18, 1984	Gene Barry, Stephen Furst	N/A
Desk- "Vacation Films"
5,225	September 19, 1984	Jason Bateman, John Davidson	Clark Terry
Desk- "Blue Cards"
5,226	September 20, 1984	Steve Martin, Annie Potts	Larry Gatlin
Desk- "College Extension Courses (UCLA and Takeoff with Burbank University)"
5,227	September 21, 1984	Charles Nelson Reilly	Cyndi Lauper ("She Bop" and "All Through The Night")
Desk- "How Do Dey Do Dat?"
5,228	September 25, 1984	Carl Reiner	Laura Branigan
Desk- "Predictions for 1985"; Desk- "Moron Movies"
5,229	September 26, 1984	Donna Mills	Julio Iglesias ("Moonlight Lady" and "When I Fall in Love")
Stump the Band
5,230	September 27, 1984	Farrah Fawcett, Ryan O'Neal	Pete Fountain
Desk- "Cop Shop Talk"
5,231	September 28, 1984	Ed Begley, Jr., Bobby Kelton, Kate Capshaw	N/A
Edge of Wetness

=== October ===
No.	Original release date	Guest(s)	Musical/entertainment guest(s)
5,232	October 2, 1984	Bert Convy, Bill Maher	N/A
Desk- "Anniversary Party Photos"
5,233	October 3, 1984	Ana Obregon, Pete Barbutti, David Fuhrer	N/A
Desk- "Umpires' Strike Demands"
5,234	October 4, 1984	Arnold Schwarzenegger, Ronnie Shakes	Nadja Salerno-Sonnenberg
Desk- "Corporate Mergers"
5,235	October 5, 1984	Teresa Ganzel, Randy Quaid	Phyllis Newman
Desk- "Public Service Announcements"
5,236	October 9, 1984	Bob Newhart, Erin Gray	Richard Stoltzman
Desk- "Excerpts from Fred's Diary"
5,237	October 10, 1984	Tony Randall, Jimmy Brogan, Corky Pigeon	N/A
Desk- "Presidential Poll and Other Questions"
5,238	October 11, 1984	Buddy Hackett	Rosemary Clooney
Sketch- "Interview with Frozen Sailor"
5,239	October 12, 1984	Burt Reynolds, Dom DeLuise, Teresa Ganzel, Dr. Joyce Brothers	N/A
Sketch- "Tea-Time Movie"
5,240	October 16, 1984	Carrie Fisher, Jim Fowler	James Graseck
Desk- "Claim Checks"
5,241	October 17, 1984	Kerrie Keane, Dave Coulier	Loretta Lynn
Desk- "Letters Retrieved from The Washington Post Office Fire"
5,242	October 18, 1984	Tim Conway	Randy Newman
Desk- "Los Angeles Songs"
5,243	October 19, 1984	Victoria Principal	Boy George, Ross Tompkins
Sketch- "Carl Sagan"
5,244	October 23, 1984	Mary Gross, Jonathan Brown	Paul McCartney
Desk- "Kids' Poll on NBC Tour"
5,245	October 24, 1984	Mariette Hartley, Randy Credico, Allen Garfield	N/A
Caption Pumpkins
5,246	October 25, 1984	Martin Mull, Jane Badler	Claude Bolling, Hubert Laws
Desk- "Blue Cards"
5,247	October 26, 1984	Teri Garr, Roy Blount, Jr.	Patti LaBelle
Desk- "Debate Clips"
5,248	October 29, 1984	David Brenner (guest host), Joe Piscopo, Drew Barrymore, Tony Danza; Joan Rivers does not appear, due to her husband's emergency surgery.	Twiggy
5,249	October 30, 1984	David Brenner (guest host), David Steinberg, Suzanne Somers; Joan Rivers does not appear, due to her husband's emergency surgery.	Little Richard
5,250	October 31, 1984	David Brenner (guest host), Vincent Price, Howie Mandel, Elvira; Joan Rivers does not appear, due to her husband's emergency surgery.	N/A

=== November ===
No.	Original release date	Guest(s)	Musical/entertainment guest(s)
5,251	November 1, 1984	David Brenner (guest host), Jerry Mathers, Robert Wuhl; Joan Rivers does not appear, due to her husband's emergency surgery.	N/A
5,252	November 2, 1984	David Brenner (guest host), Don Novello; Joan Rivers does not appear, due to her husband's emergency surgery.	Kris Kristofferson, Willie Nelson
(11/6/84 pre-empted for NBC News election night coverage)
5,253	November 7, 1984	George Burns, Bob Uecker	Lee Greenwood
Desk- "Late Breaking Election Results"
5,254	November 8, 1984	Rosalind Chao, Thalassa Cruso	The King's Singers ("Il gioco di Primiera", "The Lonesome Road")
Sketch- "Homework School of The Air"
5,255	November 9, 1984	Shelley Winters, Kevin Nealon, Joe Williams	N/A
Floyd R. Turbo- "Pro-Smoking"
5,256	November 13, 1984	Lyle Alzado	Barry Manilow
Desk- "In One Day"
5,257	November 14, 1984	George Segal, George Miller	Buddy Rich
Carnac the Magnificent
5,258	November 15, 1984	Peter Weller, Air Jazz	Kenny Rogers
Stump the Band
5,259	November 16, 1984	Sammy Davis, Jr., Scot Morris (Omni puzzles editor)	N/A
5,260	November 20, 1984	Robert Blake, Louie Anderson, Selma Diamond	N/A
Desk- "Fast Food Trivia"
5,261	November 21, 1984	Don Rickles, Angie Dickinson	Oak Ridge Boys
Desk- "Kids' Thanksgiving Letters"
5,262	November 22, 1984	David Steinberg, Michael Talbott, Ethel Nixon	N/A
Mighty Carson Art Players- "Healing Through Humor"
5,263	November 23, 1984	Harvey Korman, Pamela Stephenson	The Funny Boys
5,264	November 27, 1984	Raquel Welch, Justin Wilson	B.B. King
Desk- "What Television Shows Do During Sweeps"
5,265	November 28, 1984	Howie Mandel, Mimi Kennedy, Calvin Trillin	N/A
Desk- "Burbank Galleria"
5,266	November 29, 1984	Keshia Knight Pulliam, George Carlin	N/A
Desk- "Library Questions"
5,267	November 30, 1984	Joan Embery, Christopher Reeve, Ana Obregon	Burbank Hot Five

=== December ===
No.	Original release date	Guest(s)	Musical/entertainment guest(s)
5,268	December 3, 1984	Joan Rivers (guest host), Lucille Ball, Sandy Duncan, Morgan Fairchild, Betty White	N/A
5,269	December 4, 1984	Joan Rivers (guest host), James Caan, Lauren Hutton, Lynn Redgrave, Jimmy Aleck	N/A
5,270	December 5, 1984	Joan Rivers (guest host), Alan King, Charles Nelson Reilly	N/A
5,271	December 6, 1984	Joan Rivers (guest host), James Coco, Dr. Joyce Brothers	N/A
5,272	December 7, 1984	Joan Rivers (guest host), Anthony Perkins, Brooke Shields, Michele Lee, Dr. Ruth Westheimer	N/A
5,273	December 11, 1984	Buddy Hackett, John Lithgow	N/A
Desk- "Excerpts from Fred's Diary"; Desk- "Moron Movies"
5,274	December 12, 1984	Isabel Campbell, Steven Wright	Marilyn Horne ("Habanera")
Desk- "Christmas Television Specials"
5,275	December 13, 1984	Michael Keaton, Paul Rodriguez	Helen O'Connell
Sketch- "Dickie the Stick"
5,276	December 14, 1984	Father Guido Sarducci, Helen Slater, Arthur Jones and wife Terri	N/A
Aunt Blabby
5,277	December 18, 1984	Gregory Hines, Judge Reinhold	Loudon Wainwright III ("The Golfin' Blues")
Desk- "Santa Letters"
5,278	December 19, 1984	Bert Convy	Liona Boyd
5,279	December 20, 1984	TBA	John Denver
New Products
5,280	December 21, 1984	Garry Shandling	John Twomey, Tony Bennett
Sketch- "Reagan Reads 'Twas The Night Before Christmas'"

== Sources ==
- "Alzado finally scared". The Courier. Vol. 102, no. 7. Prescott, AZ. United Press International. January 10, 1984. p. 1B – via Google Books.
- "Ben is found unconscious tonight on 'Knot's Landing'". The Item. Vol. 89, no. 124. March 8, 1984. p. 6D – via Google Books.
- "'Dom Deluise and Friends' airs tonight at 9 on ABC-TV". The Item. Vol. 89, no. 112. February 23, 1984. p. 10C – via Google Books.
- "'Domestic Life' premieres, takes place of 'Whiz Kids'". The Item. Vol. 89, no. 69. January 4, 1984. p. 12A – via Google Books.
- "Gente..." [People...]. La Opinión (in Spanish). Vol. 58, no. 191. United Press International. March 24, 1984. p. 6 – via Google Books.
- "J.R. wants another child on 'Dallas'". The Item. Vol. 89, no. 83. January 20, 1984. p. 4B – via Google Books.
- "Jane Alexander stars in 'Calamity Jane' at 9". The Item. Vol. 89, no. 120. March 6, 1984. p. 5B – via Google Books.
- "Maggie's illness worsens on 'Falcon's Crest'". The Item. Vol. 89, no. 125. March 9, 1984. p. 6A – via Google Books.
- "'Modern Problems' airs at 9". The Item. Vol. 89, no. 75. January 11, 1984. p. 2B – via Google Books.
- "People: Here's Billy". The Dispatch. Vol. 102, no. 252. February 22, 1984. p. 2 – via Google Books.
- "Television". Deseret News. Vol. 134, no. 248. February 17, 1984. p. C7 – via Google Books.
- "Television Tonight". The Pittsburgh Press. Vol. 100, no. 193. January 6, 1984. p. C8 – via Google Books.
- "Television Tonight". The Gazette. Vol. 206. February 8, 1984. p. C-2 – via Google Books.
- "Thursday, March 15". The Vindicator. Vol. 45, no. 93. March 11, 1984. p. B11 – via Google Books.
- "Thursday Night". Telegraph Herald. Vol. 148, no. 54. March 2, 1984. p. 15 – via Google Books.
- "Today's Television". The Pittsburgh Press. Vol. 100, no. 228. February 10, 1984. p. C8 – via Google Books.
- "Tonight on TV". The Vindicator. Vol. 45, no. 184. March 2, 1984. p. 23 – via Google Books.
- "Tonight on TV". The Vindicator. Vol. 45, no. 195. March 13, 1984. p. 12 – via Google Books.
- "Tonight on TV". The Vindicator. Vol. 45, no. 198. March 16, 1984. p. 34 – via Google Books.
- "TV Listings: Wed., Apr. 4". The Daytona Beach News-Journal. Vol. 49, no. 81. April 4, 1984. p. 12A – via Google Books.
- "TV Preview: Officer Bates takes over roll call on tonight's 'Hill Street Blues'". The Item. Vol. 89, no. 100. February 9, 1984. p. 6D – via Google Books.
- "TV Preview: Shawn Weatherly stars in ABC-TV's 'Shaping Up'". The Item. Vol. 89, no. 134. March 20, 1984. p. 4B – via Google Books.
- "TV Tonight". Ellensburg Daily Record. Vol. 83, no. 11. January 13, 1984. p. 14 – via Google Books.
- "TV Tonight". Ellensburg Daily Record. Vol. 83, no. 29. February 3, 1984. p. 14 – via Google Books.
- "TV Tonight". Ellensburg Daily Record. Vol. 83, no. 32. February 7, 1984. p. 14 – via Google Books.
- "TV Tonight". Ellensburg Daily Record. Vol. 83, no. 70. March 22, 1984. p. 14 – via Google Books.
- "TV Tonight". Ellensburg Daily Record. Vol. 83, no. 74. March 27, 1984. p. 12 – via Google Books.
- "TV Tonight". The Gazette. Vol. 206. April 4, 1984. p. H-2 – via Google Books.
- "Wednesday, March 14". The Vindicator. Vol. 45, no. 93. March 11, 1984. p. B11 – via Google Books.
- "Wednesday, March 21, 1984". TV Scene. Lawrence Journal-World. Vol. 126, no. 77. March 17, 1984. p. 6 – via Google Books.
- Flander, Judy (April 6, 1984). "Copperfield Makes TV Magic Tonight". Ocala StarBanner. Vol. 40, no. 218. p. 5 – via Google Books.
- Flander, Judy (February 28, 1984). "'Grammys' eye Jackson; no refuge in PBS drama". The Ledger. Vol. 78, no. 129. p. 6C – via Google Books.
- Flander, Judy (March 28, 1984). "It's a Good Night to Read a Book". Ocala StarBanner. Vol. 40, no. 209. p. 6F – via Google Books.
- Flander, Judy (March 22, 1984). "Mystery Unraveled on 'Knots Landing'". Ocala StarBanner. Vol. 40, no. 203. p. 2D – via Google Books.
- Flander, Judy (January 19, 1984). "PBS 'Mystery' plot hangs; MTV thrills with Jackson". The Ledger. Vol. 78, no. 89. p. 8C – via Google Books.
- Flander, Judy (March 1, 1984). "Series lovers can rejoice: no specials, no miniseries". The Ledger. Vol. 78, no. 131. p. 4C – via Google Books.
- Flander, Judy (April 5, 1984). "Small Fawcett parts flow; 'Buffalo' leaves TV range". The Ledger. Vol. 78, no. 166. p. 10D – via Google Books.
- Flander, Judy (March 30, 1984). "We're Off To See The Wizard!!!". Ocala StarBanner. Vol. 40, no. 211. p. 6C – via Google Books.
- McMahon, Ed (1997). "Tonight Show Starring Johnny Carson, The". Television Academy Interviews (Interview). Interviewed by Katherine Fry.
- Sherwood, Rick (February 7, 1984). "TV Tonight: 63 hours of Winter Olympic Games coverage starts tonight". St. Joseph News-Press. Vol. 105, no. 38. p. 7A – via Google Books.
- Sherwood, Rick (February 29, 1984). "TV Tonight: Acting is superb in powerful CBS production, 'The Parade'". St. Joseph News-Press. Vol. 105, no. 60. p. 7A – via Google Books.
- Sherwood, Rick (February 15, 1984). "TV Tonight: 'AfterMASH,' 'Emerald Point' to go off the air temporarily". St. Joseph News-Press. Vol. 105, no. 46. p. 7A – via Google Books.
- Sherwood, Rick (March 29, 1984). "TV Tonight: 'Alice in Wonderland' set as miniseries". The Gainesville Sun. Vol. 108, no. 267. p. 2C – via Google Books.
- Sherwood, Rick (January 3, 1984). "TV Tonight: Andy Rooney special airs tonight". TimesDaily. Vol. 115, no. 3. p. 8B – via Google Books.
- Sherwood, Rick (February 16, 1984). "TV Tonight: Asner may return to series TV". TimesDaily. Vol. 115, no. 47. p. 6C – via Google Books.
- Sherwood, Rick (February 24, 1984). "TV Tonight: Ben Vereen joins 'Webster' gang". Spokane Daily Chronicle. Vol. 98, no. 134. p. 9 – via Google Books.
- Sherwood, Rick (February 22, 1984). "TV Tonight: 'Dynasty' to go into sndication in 1985". TimesDaily. Vol. 115, no. 53. p. 6B – via Google Books.
- Sherwood, Rick (February 21, 1984). "TV Tonight: 'Eye on Hollywood' comes to weeknight TV". TimesDaily. Vol. 115, no. 52. p. 6B – via Google Books.
- Sherwood, Rick (February 10, 1984). "TV Tonight: 'Fantastic World' not quite ready for prime time TV". Spokane Daily Chronicle. Vol. 98, no. 122. p. 16 – via Google Books.
- Sherwood, Rick (January 16, 1984). "TV Tonight: 'Matter of Sex' is a film that matters". Spokane Daily Chronicle. Vol. 98, no. 100. p. 9 – via Google Books.
- Sherwood, Rick (January 18, 1984). "TV Tonight: Michael Landon has signed for several projects with NBC". St. Joseph News-Press. Vol. 105, no. 18. p. 9A – via Google Books.
- Sherwood, Rick (March 5, 1984). "TV Tonight: 'Mirror' reflects good suspense, acting". Spokane Daily Chronicle. Vol. 98, no. 142. p. 9 – via Google Books.
- Sherwood, Rick (April 3, 1984). "TV Tonight: Miss Teen USA crowned tonight; America's on parade". Spokane Daily Chronicle. Vol. 98, no. 167. p. B11 – via Google Books.
- Sherwood, Rick (February 3, 1984). "TV Tonight: New series sent 'Dallas' ratings down noticeably last week". St. Joseph News-Press. Vol. 105, no. 34. p. 7A – via Google Books.
- Sherwood, Rick (January 17, 1984). "TV Tonight: Powerful psychological drama set on 'American Playhouse'". St. Joseph News-Press. Vol. 105, no. 17. p. 7A – via Google Books.
- Sherwood, Rick (March 7, 1984). "TV Tonight: Premiere of 'Mama Malone' offers only a couple of laughs". St. Joseph News-Press. Vol. 105, no. 67. p. 7A – via Google Books.
- Sherwood, Rick (March 13, 1984). "TV Tonight: 'Second Sight' should delight romantics". Spokane Chronicle. Vol. 98, no. 149. p. B9 – via Google Books.
- Sherwood, Rick (February 2, 1984). "TV Tonight: Showing 'Grease,' a slick flick or sticky move?". Spokane Daily Chronicle. Vol. 98, no. 115. p. 22 – via Google Books.
- Sherwood, Rick (January 31, 1984). "TV Tonight: Two good offerings, but 'True West' is the one to watch". Spokane Daily Chronicle. Vol. 98, no. 113. p. A9 – via Google Books.
- Sherwood, Rick (February 14, 1984). "TV Tonight: Viewers win this battle of the sexes". The Gainesville Sun. Vol. 108, no. 223. p. 12A – via Google Books.
- Sherwood, Rick (March 23, 1984). "TV Tonight: 'We Got It Made' may not make it past summer's end". Spokane Daily Chronicle. Vol. 98, no. 158. p. 10 – via Google Books.
