= List of The Tonight Show Starring Johnny Carson episodes (1985) =

Season of television series

- No. of episodes: 182

Release
- Original network: NBC

Season chronology
- ← Previous; 1984 episodes Next → 1986 episodes

The following is a list of episodes of the television series The Tonight Show Starring Johnny Carson which aired in 1985. In October, 1962 Johnny Carson took over as host of the show from the previous host Jack Paar.

== 1985 ==
=== January ===
No.	Original release date	Guest(s)	Musical/entertainment guest(s)
5,281	January 2, 1985	Suzanne Pleshette, Louie Anderson	James Galway
Desk - "Psychic Predictions - 1985"
5,282	January 3, 1985	John Davidson, Elya Baskin	Michael Davis
Desk - "Time Magazine 'Man of The Year'"
5,283	January 4, 1985	Charles Nelson Reilly, A. Whitney Brown, Peter Fonda	N/A
Sketch - "David Howitzer - Consumer Supporter"
5,284	January 8, 1985	Jerry Seinfeld, Ed Begley, Jr.	Laura Branigan
Desk - "Tonight Show Trivial Pursuit"
5,285	January 9, 1985	Alan King, Elya Baskin	Liona Boyd
Desk - "Joke Rivalry Between the States"
5,286	January 10, 1985	Tyne Daly	Judith Blegen
Desk - "Calendars for 1985"
5,287	January 11, 1985	Lee Trevino, David Letterman	Free Flight
Desk - "Blue Cards"
5,288	January 15, 1985	George Michaels, Pete Barbutti, Stephen Furst	N/A
Desk - "In One Day"
5,289	January 16, 1985	Tom Dreesen	Willie Nelson, Kris Kristofferson
Desk - "Public Service Announcements"
5,290	January 17, 1985	Donna Mills, Kevin Rooney	Mummenschanz
Sketch - "Evening News in 2005"
5,291	January 18, 1985	Shelley Long, Bill Maher	The Labèque Sisters
Desk - "President Reagan Press Conference (Johnny Live Voiceover- Over Tape)"
5,292	January 22, 1985	Mariette Hartley	Itzhak Perlman
Desk - "Snapshots of Inaugural Activities"
5,293	January 23, 1985	Joey Bishop	Linda Ronstadt
Carnac the Magnificent
5,294	January 24, 1985	Gene Kelly, Blake Clark, Lonette McKee	N/A
Desk - "Ann Landers Survey"
5,295	January 25, 1985	Teri Garr, Roy Blount, Jr.	Toni Tennille
Stump the Band
5,296	January 28, 1985	Joan Rivers (guest host), Gallagher, Judge Joseph Wapner	Nell Carter ("Be Mine Tonight")
5,297	January 29, 1985	Joan Rivers (guest host), Howie Mandel, Selma Diamond, Ali MacGraw, Oprah Winfrey	N/A
5,298	January 30, 1985	Joan Rivers (guest host), Erma Bombeck, Bronson Pinchot	N/A
5,299	January 31, 1985	Joan Rivers (guest host), Emmanuel Lewis, George Hamilton, Steven Wright	N/A

=== February ===
No.	Original release date	Guest(s)	Musical/entertainment guest(s)
5,300	February 1, 1985	Joan Rivers (guest host), Mayor Ed Koch, Bill Cosby, Elizabeth Ashley	N/A
5,301	February 5, 1985	Mark & Delia Owens	Glen Campbell
Desk - "The Good Side of Bad News"
5,302	February 6, 1985	Ricky Schroder, Lisa Eilbacher, Justin Wilson	N/A
Desk - "Movies That Didn't Get Nominated"
5,303	February 7, 1985	Jim Fowler, Ritch Shydner	Yo-Yo Ma (Tambourin chinois)
Desk - "Blue Cards"
5,304	February 8, 1985	Marsha Mason, Sydney Goldsmith, Waddie Mitchell, Nyle Henderson	N/A
Stump the Band
5,305	February 12, 1985	Bob Uecker, Mark Hudson, David Horowitz	N/A
Desk - "Presidential Trivia"
5,306	February 13, 1985	Ronnie Shakes	Mel Tillis
Sketch - "Greengrocer Joe Cabbageoni"
5,307	February 14, 1985	Lavern McDavitt	Eydie Gormé, Steve Lawrence
5,308	February 15, 1985	Ally Sheedy, John Davidson	Michal Urbaniak
Desk - "Unusual Vacation Films"
5,309	February 19, 1985	Bert Convy, Rod Hull	N/A
Desk - "What Television Shows Do During Sweeps"
5,310	February 20, 1985	David Steinberg, Tom Hulce	Betty Buckley ("The Wind Beneath My Wings")
Desk - "Fortune Cookies"
5,311	February 21, 1985	Brad Garrett	Dionne Warwick
Desk - "How Do Dey Do Dat?"
5,312	February 22, 1985	McLean Stevenson, Rosalind Chao, Dorothy Loudon	Ron McCroby
5,313	February 26, 1985	Steve Landesberg, Lewis Grizzard	Anita Morris
Desk - "Public Service Announcements"
5,314	February 27, 1985	Smothers Brothers, Jami Gertz	Lee Greenwood
Edge of Wetness
5,315	February 28, 1985	Shelley Winters, Martin Kove	Catte Adams
Stump the Band

=== March ===
No.	Original release date	Guest(s)	Musical/entertainment guest(s)
5,316	March 1, 1985	Robert Blake, Christie Brinkley	N/A
Sketch - "Dr. Ruth"
5,317	March 19, 1985	Charles Grodin, Kevin Nealon, Linda Thorson	N/A
Desk - "Writers' Strike Demands"
5,318	March 20, 1985	John Larroquette, Buddy Hackett	Patti LaBelle
Desk - "Children's Proverbs"
5,319	March 21, 1985	Candice Bergen, Tim Reid	George Carl
Desk - "Who's in Charge Here?"
5,320	March 22, 1985	F. Murray Abraham, Victoria Jackson	Louie Bellson, The Labèque Sisters (Fantasy on Porgy & Bess)
5,321	March 26, 1985	James Stewart	Nadja Salerno-Sonnenberg
Desk - "Carson's Choice Awards"
5,322	March 27, 1985	Howie Mandel, Ted Danson	Little Richard
Desk - "Whatchamacallit Words"
5,323	March 28, 1985	Jack Lemmon	The Groundlings (Jon Lovitz, Timothy Stack, Don Woodard, Mindy Sterling, Kate Benton); Joe Williams
Desk - "Reagan Press Conference (Pre-Tape with Actual Press Conference)"
5,324	March 29, 1985	Dorothy Loudon, Gallagher, Jennifer O'Neill	N/A
Floyd R. Turbo - "Against Mandatory Seat Belts"

=== April ===
No.	Original release date	Guest(s)	Musical/entertainment guest(s)
5,325	April 2, 1985	Colleen Camp, Jeff Daniels	B.B. King
Desk - "Network Takeover Rumors"
5,326	April 3, 1985	Drew Barrymore, Joe Penny	Maureen McGovern
Desk - "Things You Don't Want to Hear from Service People"
5,327	April 4, 1985	George Segal, Alice Krige	N/A
5,328	April 5, 1985	Joan Collins, Roy Blount, Jr.	Whitney Houston ("You Give Good Love")
Desk - "Famous Tax Cheats"
5,329	April 8, 1985	Joan Rivers (guest host), Bill Cosby, John Davidson, Marvelous Marvin Hagler, Donna Mills	N/A
5,330	April 9, 1985	Joan Rivers (guest host), Gary Coleman, Louie Anderson, Cher	N/A
5,331	April 10, 1985	Joan Rivers (guest host), David Brenner, Lucie Arnaz, Tony Danza	N/A
5,332	April 11, 1985	Joan Rivers (guest host), Ed Begley, Jr., Garry Shandling, Sally Kellerman	N/A
5,333	April 12, 1985	Joan Rivers (guest host), Susan Sullivan, Dr. Ruth Westheimer	Rita Moreno
5,334	April 16, 1985	Amy Irving, Calvin Trillin	Jay Johnson
Examples of Animals Whose Genes Have Been Crossed
5,335	April 17, 1985	Father Guido Sarducci, Patty Duke, Joe Garagiola	N/A
Takes audience poll on their sexual attitudes and compares with Dr. Joyce Brothers poll on New Yorkers.
5,336	April 18, 1985	Mariette Hartley, Michael Palin	N/A
Desk - "Simplifying Taxes"; Desk - "Personalized License Plates"
5,337	April 19, 1985	Donald O'Connor, Ornella Muti, Argus Hamilton	N/A
Tonight Show version of some commercials
5,338	April 23, 1985	Anita Morris, Argus Hamilton	Roger Miller
People Magazine's Readers Poll
5,339	April 24, 1985	David Steinberg, Scot Morris	Julia Migenes-Johnson
Desk - "Answers from School Children"
5,340	April 25, 1985	Alan King, Maria Conchita Alonso, Scot Morris (Omni puzzles editor)	Pete Fountain
5,341	April 26, 1985	JoBeth Williams, Elya Baskin, Dr. Jim King	N/A
Desk - Johnny answers questions submitted by the audience

=== May ===
No.	Original release date	Guest(s)	Musical/entertainment guest(s)
5,342	May 7, 1985	John Ritter, George Miller, Grace Jones	N/A
Carnac the Magnificent
5,343	May 8, 1985	Bob Newhart, Marvelous Marvin Hagler	Stanley Jordan
Desk - "TV Pilots That Didn't Make It"
5,344	May 9, 1985	Red Buttons	Roy Clark
Mighty Carson Art Players - "Dr. Ruth Sketch"
5,345	May 10, 1985	David Letterman, Victoria Jackson, Patsy Dawson & Twiggy the Dog	N/A
Desk - "Momilies"
5,346	May 14, 1985	Tom Brokaw, Kevin Rooney	Johnny Mathis ("Hooked on Goodbye", "Right From the Heart")
Desk - "Forbes' Magazine's Highest Profit Making Corporations in America"
5,347	May 15, 1985	Robert Klein, Richard Bass	Andreas Vollenweider ("Pace/Verde")
Desk - "Well Known Proverbs"
5,348	May 16, 1985	Dom DeLuise	George Benson
Desk - "Unusual Things Large Companies Research"
5,349	May 17, 1985	Roger Moore	Leonard Waxdeck & The Birdcallers
Desk - "International Signs"
5,350	May 21, 1985	Sylvester Stallone, A. Whitney Brown	Horacio Gutiérrez (Transcendental Étude)
Desk - "Public Service Announcements"
5,351	May 22, 1985	Cloris Leachman, Kevin Nealon, Courteney Cox	N/A
Stump the Band
5,352	May 23, 1985	Tony Randall, Saundra Santiago	Al Jarreau
Desk - "As The White House Turns"
5,353	May 24, 1985	Teri Garr, Tom Dreesen, Lance Burton	N/A
New Game - "A Question of Scruples"
5,354	May 28, 1985	Patrick Duffy, Jimmy Aleck	Amherst Sax Quartet
Desk - "New Tax Plan"
5,355	May 29, 1985	Jim Fowler	John Denver ("Don't Close Your Eyes Tonight")
Sketch - "Professor John W. Carson"
5,356	May 30, 1985	Chevy Chase, Maureen Murphy, Vanity	N/A
Edge of Wetness
5,357	May 31, 1985	Charles Grodin	Anita Morris
Mighty Carson Art Players - "Tea-Time Movie"

=== June ===
No.	Original release date	Guest(s)	Musical/entertainment guest(s)
5,358	June 3, 1985	Joan Rivers (guest host), Lynda Carter, Danny Sullivan, Robin Leach	Grace Jones
5,359	June 4, 1985	Joan Rivers (guest host), Charles Nelson Reilly, Martha Plimpton	Anthony Newley
5,360	June 5, 1985	Joan Rivers (guest host), John Travolta, David Steinberg, Stephen Barry	Natalie Cole ("Dangerous")
5,361	June 6, 1985	Joan Rivers (guest host), Don Rickles, Bonnie Franklin, Dack Rambo	Patti LaBelle ("Stir it Up", "Forever Young")
5,362	June 7, 1985	Joan Rivers (guest host), Laraine Newman, Florence Henderson, Dick Cavett, Lana Wood	N/A
5,363	June 11, 1985	Balu Natarajan (1985 Scripps National Spelling Bee champion), Buddy Hackett	Charles "Honi" Coles
5,364	June 12, 1985	Magic Johnson	Phil Collins ("Against All Odds (Take a Look At Me Now)", "The Roof Is Leaking")
Desk - "Bargains in France"
5,365	June 13, 1985	Ana Obregon, Catherine Costello	Joe Williams
Potential Fill-ins for Tommy Newsom
5,366	June 14, 1985	Sammy Davis, Jr., Dr. Paul Ekman	N/A
Mighty Carson Art Players - "G. Walter Schneer - Auto Mechanics Representative"
5,367	June 18, 1985	Franklyn Ajaye, Tom Conti	Roger Bobo ("Carnival of Venice")
Summer Movie Titles and Some Shows; Low Budget Films to Come
5,368	June 19, 1985	Tim Reid, Ronnie Shakes, Dian Fossey	N/A
Speech Giving Some Poems, Do's and Don'ts, and Advice to Graduates
5,369	June 20, 1985	Burt Reynolds, Jim Grastie	Laura Branigan ("Spanish Eddie" and "Forever Young")
Predictions From The Tabloids
5,370	June 21, 1985	Wil Shriner, Connie Chung	B.B. King ("I've Got a Mind to Give Up Living" and "My Lucille")
Company Mergers
5,371	June 25, 1985	Brigitte Nielsen, Pete Barbutti	Luciano Pavarotti ("Che gelida manina", "Mamma")
Conduct a Survey Using the Applause Meter of Questions Pertaining to UFO Information
5,372	June 26, 1985	Kaleena Kiff	Tom Jones ("The Heat is On" and "Memory"), Girls Rock Club ("You Got Me Burnin'")
Letters from Fans; Fred's Diary
5,373	June 27, 1985	Shelley Winters, Jerry Seinfeld	The King's Singers
Mighty Carson Art Players - "Mr. Rambo's Neighborhood"
5,374	June 28, 1985	Howie Mandel	National Chinese Acrobats
List of Gifts the President and Vice President Has Received Over The Year

=== July ===
No.	Original release date	Guest(s)	Musical/entertainment guest(s)
5,375	July 8, 1985	Joan Rivers (guest host), George Peppard, Helen Slater	N/A
5,376	July 9, 1985	Joan Rivers (guest host), Sandy Duncan, Jackie Collins, Fritz Coleman	Tommy Tune
5,377	July 10, 1985	Joan Rivers (guest host), Don Ameche, Rich Hall, Rob Lowe	Nell Carter ("Walking on Sunshine" and "Ain't Misbehavin'")
5,378	July 11, 1985	Joan Rivers (guest host), Hulk Hogan, Charles Nelson Reilly, Catherine Oxenberg	Weather Girls
5,379	July 12, 1985	Joan Rivers (guest host), John Byner, Steve Guttenberg	Roger Miller, Rick James
5,380	July 23, 1985	Rawson Stovall, Dabney Coleman	Horacio Gutierrez (Moszkowski Étude in A-flat major, Étincelles)
Desk - "Johnny's Journal"
5,381	July 24, 1985	Buddy Hackett, Jennifer Tilly	David Weiss
Floyd R. Turbo - "Rebuttal Against The New Coke"
5,382	July 25, 1985	Michael J. Fox, Charles Nelson Reilly	Weird Al Yankovic ("Yoda", "Hooked On Polkas")
New Products
5,383	July 26, 1985	Prof. Bernard Leikind, Joe Penny	N/A
Sing Along with Johnny
5,384	July 30, 1985	Mel Fisher	McGuire Sisters
Reads some items from his own biography called 'Carson'.
5,385	July 31, 1985	Christa McAuliffe, Rita Wilson	Stanley Jordan ("Moon River", "Fun Dance")
Edge of Wetness

=== August ===
No.	Original release date	Guest(s)	Musical/entertainment guest(s)
5,386	August 1, 1985	Bill Maher, David Horowitz	The Labèque Sisters
One Millionth Guest Winning a Weekend at Johnny's House
5,387	August 2, 1985	Carl Reiner, George Miller, Teresa Ganzel	N/A
Mighty Carson Art Players - "Ranger Gus Grungie"
5,388	August 12, 1985	Joan Rivers (guest host), David Brenner, Lynn Redgrave, Brooke Shields, Fisher Stevens	N/A
5,389	August 13, 1985	Joan Rivers (guest host), Julie Walters, Dick Shawn, Patti D'Arbanville	Itzhak Perlman (Kreisler Syncopation, Sarasate Tarantella)
5,390	August 14, 1985	Joan Rivers (guest host), Mary Lou Retton, Pee Wee Herman, Betty White, Roddy McDowall	N/A
5,391	August 15, 1985	Joan Rivers (guest host), Leah Adler, John Davidson, Tracey Ullman, Richard Lewis	N/A
5,392	August 16, 1985	Joan Rivers (guest host), Shelley Winters, Garry Shandling, Norman Mailer	Clint Holmes
Brings On Her Dog Spike and Promptly Wets on Joan's Lap
5,393	August 20, 1985	Boris Becker, Robert Klein	Yo-Yo Ma (Bach "Gigue", Severinsen "Yo-Yo's Blues")
Film Clip of Johnny's Trip to Mel Fisher's Treasure Sight
5,394	August 21, 1985	George Carlin, Chuck Yeager	N/A
Stump the Band
5,395	August 22, 1985	Arnold Schwarzenegger, Ed Begley, Jr., National Hollerin' Contest winner Ginger McLamb	N/A
Public Service Announcements
5,396	August 23, 1985	Gary Busey, Roseanne Barr, Steve Trotter	N/A
Messages from Celebrities on their Answering Machines
5,397	August 27, 1985	Bob Uecker, Carol Alt	Smokey Robinson
Ed shows a picture of Johnny in cowboy gear and Johnny holds up photos representing Bush's 474 minutes as President.
5,398	August 28, 1985	Chuck Norris, Victoria Jackson	Glen Campbell
Extension Courses from University of Burbank
5,399	August 29, 1985	Doug Henning	Tony Bennett
Mighty Carson Art Players - "Dr. Ruth"

=== September ===
No.	Original release date	Guest(s)	Musical/entertainment guest(s)
5,400	September 3, 1985	Robert Blake	Nadja Salerno-Sonnenberg
Reads some questions that people wants to know about him.
5,401	September 4, 1985	Jane Fonda	George Carl, Roger Bobo ("Romanian Dance #2")
Carnac the Magnificent
5,402	September 5, 1985	Burt Reynolds, Sonia Braga	Paul Young ("Every Time You Go Away" and "Tear Your Playhouse Down")
What People Think on Television
5,403	September 6, 1985	Steven Wright	Joe Williams
Graduation Commencement Speech
5,404	September 9, 1985	Joan Rivers (guest host), Howie Mandel, Roger Ebert, Gene Siskel, Morgan Fairchild	Mac Davis
5,405	September 10, 1985	Joan Rivers (guest host), Tony Danza, Mariel Hemingway, Erma Bombeck, Gallagher	N/A
5,406	September 11, 1985	Joan Rivers (guest host), Michael J. Fox, Kevin Nealon, Richard Simmons, Bea Arthur	N/A
5,407	September 12, 1985	Joan Rivers (guest host), James Brolin, Barbara Walters, Marla Gibbs, Vincent Price	N/A
5,408	September 13, 1985	Joan Rivers (guest host), Bob Hope, Bruce Weitz, Oprah Winfrey	The Manhattan Transfer
5,409	September 17, 1985	Buddy Hackett, Phil Donahue	N/A
Photos That Represent People Who Have Appeared on The Donahue Show
5,410	September 18, 1985	Joe Garagiola, Paul Rodriguez, Glynis Barber	N/A
Edge of Wetness
5,411	September 19, 1985	Ted Danson, Courteney Cox, Judy Schwartz and Rickey Berkowitz	N/A
Johnny is going for his record 4,192nd laugh; a clip of 'Henny Cobb' setting the record in the 1920s is shown. Johnny then goes from the dressing room to the stage with an entourage behind him cheering, tells a stupid joke, cries over his big celebration, and gets a phone call from President Reagan congratulating him.
5,412	September 20, 1985	David Steinberg	Bob & Ray, Cock Robin
5,413	September 24, 1985	Garry Shandling (guest host), Teri Garr, Ed Begley, Jr., Blake Clark	Lou Rawls ("Hoochie Coochie Man")
5,414	September 25, 1985	Michael Landon, Glenn Close	Ernie Watts Quartet ("One Love")
Desk - "Mother Goose Rhymes"
5,415	September 26, 1985	Tim Conway	Marilyn Horne
Desk - From the 'Dictionary of American Regional English', some expressions used in different parts of the country for the same thing.
5,416	September 27, 1985	Charles Grodin, Olivia Brown	Clark Terry
Desk - "Poor Johnny's Almanac"

=== October ===
No.	Original release date	Guest(s)	Musical/entertainment guest(s)
5,417	October 1, 1985	Lyle Alzado, Jimmy Brogan	Melissa Manchester
Answers questions from the audience.
5,418	October 2, 1985	John Howard, Jackee Harry	Buddy Rich
Desk - "Statistical Tables"
5,419	October 3, 1985	Dr. Armand Hammer, John Bryson	Richard Stoltzman
Stump the Band
5,420	October 4, 1985	Loni Anderson, Tim Thomerson, Mark & Delia Owens	N/A
Reagan Press Conference, with Johnny asking the questions.
5,421	October 16, 1985	George Burns, Mariette Hartley	N/A
Columbus' Origins, Journeys, and Personal Information
5,422	October 17, 1985	Mary Armstrong	Steve Lawrence
Recent Language in Commercials; What the Sponsors are Really Trying to Tell Us
5,423	October 18, 1985	Jackie Gleason	Jim Stafford
Blue Cards; Answers questions from the audience.
5,424	October 22, 1985	Bobby Kelton, Roy Blount, Jr.	Liza Minnelli ("Boys and Girls Like You and Me")
Desk - "Dangerous Tax Payers and How to Recognize Them"
5,425	October 23, 1985	Bert Convy, Martina Navratilova	Julia Migenes-Johnson ("Csárdás")
Bronson Brothers come out and sing Johnny 'Happy Birthday'
5,426	October 24, 1985	Suzanne Pleshette, Joe Piscopo	Dizzy Gillespie
Evening News with Zontar Rather in the Year 2005
5,427	October 25, 1985	Dyan Cannon, Scott Cully	Laura Branigan
Carved Pumpkins
5,428	October 28, 1985	Joan Rivers (guest host), Howie Mandel, John Larroquette	N/A
5,429	October 29, 1985	Joan Rivers (guest host), Rex Harrison, Kate Jackson, Susan Sullivan, Griffin Dunne	N/A
Noticeable Car Jokes
5,430	October 30, 1985	Joan Rivers (guest host), Martin Mull, Nancy McKeon, Priscilla Presley, Julia Child	N/A
5,431	October 31, 1985	Joan Rivers (guest host), David Lee Roth, Pee Wee Herman, Phyllis Diller, Elvira	N/A

=== November ===
No.	Original release date	Guest(s)	Musical/entertainment guest(s)
5,432	November 1, 1985	Joan Rivers (guest host), Lucille Ball, Steven Wright, Dr. Ruth Westheimer	N/A
5,433	November 5, 1985	Peter Strauss, Teddy Bergeron, Bret Saberhagen	N/A
Public Service Announcement
5,434	November 6, 1985	Roseanne Barr, Alexandra Paul	Julio Iglesias ("I've Got You Under My Skin" and "Ni Te Tengo Ni Te Olvido")
5,435	November 7, 1985	Thalassa Cruso	Pilobolus
Carson's Believe It or Stuff It
5,436	November 8, 1985	Larry Miller	Lee Greenwood
Things Sent by Fans; Programs That Are Big in Russia
5,437	November 12, 1985	Garry Shandling (guest host), Teresa Ganzel	James Taylor
5,438	November 13, 1985	Carl Reiner, David Huddleston	André-Philippe Gagnon, impersonator, performed "We Are The World"
5,439	November 14, 1985	Eura Irwin, Robert Blake, David Horowitz	N/A
5,440	November 15, 1985	Dick Shawn, Edward Pembroke	Gheorghe Zamfir
Sing Along to Bye Bye Bhagwan
5,441	November 19, 1985	Pete Barbutti	Grace Jones, John McLaughlin
Game - "Scruples"
5,442	November 20, 1985	Saundra Santiago, David Brenner	The Roches
Blue Cards
5,443	November 21, 1985	Ryan O'Neal, Bob Uecker	The Judds performed "Grandpa (Tell Me 'Bout the Good Ole Days)"
Stump the Band
5,444	November 22, 1985	Jim Fowler, Marty Pollio	N/A
Johnny does an Audience Health Survey using an Applause Meter.
5,445	November 26, 1985	Jack Gallagher, Gore Vidal	The Labèque Sisters (Rhapsody in Blue)
Questionnaires to Grammar School Students Asking Questions about Thanksgiving
5,446	November 27, 1985	Lyle Alzado, Yakov Smirnoff	Patti LaBelle
5,447	November 28, 1985	Ethel Brunnick, Victoria Jackson	Kiri Te Kanawa ("Vissi d'arte", "Blue Skies")
Weird Relatives That Visit on the Holidays; Blue Cards
5,448	November 29, 1985	Chevy Chase, Dan Aykroyd, David Letterman	Barry Manilow performed "In Search of Love", "Some Sweet Day" and "Sweet Heaven (I'm In Love Again)"

=== December ===
No.	Original release date	Guest(s)	Musical/entertainment guest(s)
5,449	December 2, 1985	Joan Rivers (guest host), Christopher Reeve, Charles Nelson Reilly	Larry Gatlin
5,450	December 3, 1985	Joan Rivers (guest host), Rue McClanahan, Telma Hopkins, Peter Falk	Tom Jones
5,451	December 4, 1985	Joan Rivers (guest host), Howard Cosell, Charlton Heston, Brigitte Nielsen, Gallagher	Whitney Houston performed "Saving All My Love for You"
5,452	December 5, 1985	Joan Rivers (guest host), Telly Savalas, George Hamilton, Pamela Bellwood, Rich Hall	N/A
5,453	December 6, 1985	Joan Rivers (guest host), Jon Voight, Michele Lee, Jimmy Connors	John Davidson
5,454	December 10, 1985	Alan King	Vlasta Krsek
Christmas Specials Listed on the Hollywood Reporter; Ideas That Were Submitted to The Network for Holiday Shows and Turned Down
5,455	December 11, 1985	William F. Buckley, Jr., John Larroquette	Joe Williams
5,456	December 12, 1985	Robert Klein, Birdie McKay	Stanley Jordan
Letters from the New York Post Office That Were Addressed to Santa Claus; Letters from Children of Poor Families asking Santa for Gifts for Family Members
5,457	December 13, 1985	Bob Hope, Tim Reid	Luther Vandross performed "'Til My Baby Comes Home" and "If Only for One Night"
Strange Christmas Gifts
5,458	December 17, 1985	Ana Obregon	Bette Midler performed "Fat As I Am" and "Skylark"
Ed shows a picture of his new baby girl, Catherine Mary.
5,459	December 18, 1985	Tim Reid, Dick Shawn	Michael McDonald
Interstate Rivalry Jokes
5,460	December 19, 1985	Kevin Nealon	David Tolley (pianist), Mary Jo Manela (pianist)
New Products
5,461	December 20, 1985	Jack Lemmon, Jack Velasco	Sade performed "Smooth Operator" and "The Sweetest Taboo"
Prop man brings out a fruit cake on a forklift and drops it through Johnny's desk.; Letters from School Children in Response to Question 'When Do You Know It Is Not Going to Be a Perfect Christmas?'
5,462	December 31, 1985	Bill Maher, Marty Pollio	B.B. King, Laura Branigan
