= William Ballantine (disambiguation) =

William Ballantine (1812–1887) was an English Serjeant-at-law.

William Ballantine is also the name of:

- William Ballantine (priest) (1616/1618–1661), Roman Catholic clergyman who became the first Prefect of Scotland
- William Ballantine (MP) (1847–1911), British Member of Parliament for Coventry 1887–1895
- Bill Ballantine (illustrator) (1910–1999), American illustrator of circus subjects
- Bill Ballantine (biologist) (1937–2015), marine biologist from New Zealand
