= Sarah Nash Gates =

American costume designer (1949–2015)

- Born: 1949
- Died: December 4, 2015, age 66; Seattle, Washington
- Occupations: Costume designer, educator
- Years active: 1976–2015

Sarah Nash Gates (1949 – December 4, 2015) was a Seattle-based costume designer, and theatre arts professor at the University of Washington. She served as the president of the United States Institute for Theatre Technology (USITT) from 1991 to 1994. From 1994 to 2014 she served as the executive director of the School of Drama at the University of Washington.

== Educator ==
Gates was raised with two siblings in Cambridge, Massachusetts, with summers usually spent at the family's cabin in Milbridge, Maine, riding horses and sailing. She enrolled at Boston University to study acting, but soon discovered her greater interest in costuming.

Gates earned a Bachelor of Arts degree at Boston University and then continued there to earn a Bachelor of Fine Arts degree in 1973. She went to California to complete a Master of Arts degree from the University of California, Santa Barbara in 1974. She taught at the State University of New York at Fredonia and also at Stephens College in Missouri. In mid-1976 she co-taught costume-making to 57 would-be clowns at the Ringling Bros. and Barnum & Bailey Clown College under the directorship of Bill Ballantine. To teach clown costuming, Gates partnered with Anne C. de Velder, who went on to serve as assistant professor of costume design at the University of Illinois, Krannert Center for the Performing Arts.

Gates came back to Boston University to earn a Master of Fine Arts degree in 1984. She then accepted a teaching position at the University of Washington in Seattle, staying there for 30 years. She taught costume design and the history of costuming. In 1994 Gates advanced to become the executive director of the School of Drama at the University of Washington. Under her leadership, the Floyd and Delores Jones Playhouse was renovated.

== Costume designer ==
Gates designed costumes for many theatrical productions around the U.S. but especially in Seattle for the 5th Avenue Theatre and Seattle Repertory Theatre. Other theatre groups for which she designed costumes include ACT Theatre, Denver Center for the Performing Arts, Intiman Theatre, Oregon Shakespeare Festival, Pennsylvania Opera Theater, the Aspen Music Festival, Seattle Children's Theatre, Seattle Opera and Pacific Performance Project (P3 East). Some of Gates' designs were shown at the Prague Quadrennial in 1987 and 1991.

- 1980 – Showboat at Wolf Trap National Park for the Performing Arts, Virginia
- 1986 – Salome's Dance of the Seven Veils, an excerpt from the opera Salome performed by soprano Josephine Barstow, choreographed by Mark Morris, at the Seattle Opera House
- 2009 – To Begin the World Over Again: The Life of Thomas Paine, a traveling one-man show by Ian Ruskin, made into a TV movie in 2016.
- 2013 – Oliver! at 5th Avenue Theatre
- 2015 – Carousel at 5th Avenue Theatre

== Theatre associations ==
Gates was thoroughly involved in professional theatre organizations. She attended her first USITT meeting in 1976, and helped form the Costume Design & Technology Commission. In 1980 she began serving on the board of directors, and she was chair of the Finance Committee from 1984 to 1990. She was inducted as a USITT Fellow in 1989. In 1991 she was the first woman and the first costume designer elected president, serving a three-year term. To lighten the mood at one USITT meeting in Wichita in 1993 at which difficult decisions were to be made, Gates entered the room riding a horse. She was granted the Founder's Award in 1995.

In 1997 Gates helped found Theatre Puget Sound, serving on the first board of directors. She was a member of the United Scenic Artists union, Local 829. She was president of the University/Resident Theatre Association (U/RTA) from 2007 to 2010. She served on the board of directors of the 5th Avenue Theatre.

== Death ==
Gates came out of retirement in mid-2015 to serve temporarily as dean of the arts division of the University of Washington. She was subsequently diagnosed with brain and lung cancer. She died at home in Seattle on December 4, 2015. A memorial service was held February 1, 2016.
