= Lynching of Joe Smith =

1927 lynching of a Black man in Mississippi

Coordinates: 32°51′23″N 90°24′27″W

Joe Smith was an African-American man who was lynched by a mob in Yazoo City, Mississippi, on July 7, 1927.

The Decatur Daily reported that Joe Smith attempted to "attack" a "young white girl" on July 6, and when discovered by the father, used the girl as a shield to protect himself from the father's gun. Smith was captured and "spirited away" by a group of men after the girl had identified him; Sheriff W. T. Shirley and his deputies attempted to find him, but said he was likely to be lynched. Soon after, the bullet-riddled body was found hanging from a tree, some 17 miles (27 km) from Yazoo City.

John R. Steelman, who wrote his PhD dissertation on "mob action in the South", listed Joe Smith as one of the cases, and phrased it thus: "Joe Smith is alleged to have 'attempted to attack a young white girl'. On July 7 his body, 'full of hot lead', was found hanging to the limb of a tree."
