= Steve Smith (clown) =

Steve Smith (born August 8, 1951), professional clown and circus director, is best known to audiences as the clown character, "TJ Tatters."

== Biography ==
Smith grew up in Zanesville, Ohio, and is a 1969 graduate of Zanesville High School.

Steve Smith began his career in clowning as a graduate of Ringling Bros. and Barnum & Bailey Clown College, Class of 1971. He then toured with The Greatest Show on Earth for six seasons before leaving the show and moving to Chicago, Illinois, where he attended the Goodman School of Drama at the Art Institute of Chicago (now The Theatre School at DePaul University) and earned a Bachelor of Fine Arts in acting. At that time, he also hosted a children's television series called Kidding Around for the local NBC affiliate, WMAQ-TV. He was the recipient of five Emmy Awards for Outstanding Achievement in Children's Television and was a favorite among viewers for seven seasons.

Steve's connection with Ringling Bros. resumed when he became Director of Clown College in 1985, a post he held for ten years. He was also the director of the 123rd edition of Ringling Bros. and Barnum & Bailey Circus

Smith became involved with the staging of numerous performances and productions from the off-Broadway hit The It Girl to programs for Walt Disney World to shipboard entertainment with Royal Caribbean Cruise Lines. Smith also worked with Academy Award-winning animator/cartoonist Chuck Jones as Talent Development Coordinator for Chuck Jones Enterprises. Smith continued to work with his boyhood hero until Mr. Jones's death in 2002.

In 2005, Smith started working with the Big Apple Circus as their Guest Director for four productions, a collaboration that extended through five seasons, ending in 2010.

In 2011, Smith began his stint as Creative Director for Circus Arts Conservatory in Sarasota, Florida. And on April 1, 2015, Smith joined Circus Center, San Francisco’s circus training and performing arts center, as its Creative Director.

== Awards ==
Smith was inducted into the Clown Hall of Fame in 1993. He is also the recipient of several other honors including the Medal of Merit for Notable Achievement in Performing Arts from Ohio University, the Excellence in the Arts award from De Paul University, and the John and Mabel Ringling Museum of Art Circus Celebrity, Power Behind the Scenes.
