= The News Is the News =

American television news satire

- Created by: Herb Sargent
- Starring: Karen Dale; Michael Davis; Simon Jones; Charlotte Moore; Lynne Thigpen; Michael Palin
- Country of origin: United States
- Original language: English
- No. of seasons: 1
- No. of episodes: 4

Production
- Running time: 30 minutes

Original release
- Network: NBC
- Release: June 15 – July 13, 1983

The News Is the News was a live news-satire program that aired four episodes on NBC in the summer of 1983.

== Creation ==
Herb Sargent, a TV comedy writer since the days of Broadway Open House in the early 1950s, created and produced the show; it debuted on Wednesday, June 15, 1983, airing for a half hour at 10:00 pm Eastern Time.

Sargent was also producer of the American version of the seminal news-satire program, That Was the Week That Was, which also aired on NBC, from January 1964 to May 1965. Described as a "pseudo-newscast...to lampoon, satirize, bludgeon, incinerate, josh, reduce to ashes, and otherwise play havoc with the real news of the preceding seven days," TNITN featured Karen Dale as the lead anchor, with Michael Davis, Simon Jones, Charlotte Moore, Lynne Thigpen and Trey Wilson as correspondents. Michael Palin also contributed a segment on the first anniversary of the surrender of Argentinian forces in the Falkland Islands.

The News Is the News was also unusual in that it was carried live, from NBC's studios at 30 Rockefeller Plaza in New York (verified by showing actual newspaper front pages from the day of the broadcast); it was, at the time, the only (non-sports) program to air live in prime time on any of the TV networks, and one of the few to do so since the pre-videotape era of the 1950s. But airing up against ABC's hit soap Dynasty, TNITN drew few viewers—its most-seen episode finished a poor 45th for the week, with a 10.8 rating and a 19 percent share—and many of those who did tune in were not impressed (a whopping 86 percent of the mail NBC received about the show was critical). Finally, the show was cancelled after airing only half of its planned eight episodes, because, as NBC president Brandon Tartikoff put it, "it was not very good. In four weeks I saw no sizable growth in terms of the development of the show."

== Cancellation ==
After TNITN (and reruns of Taxi, which had been airing at 10:30 as part of NBC's "New Adult Comedy Hour") were cancelled, the network filled out the summer with re-runs of the series The Family Tree in the time slot.
