= Broadway Danny Rose =

1984 film by Woody Allen

- Theatrical release poster
- Directed by: Woody Allen
- Written by: Woody Allen
- Produced by: Robert Greenhut
- Starring: Woody Allen; Mia Farrow; Nick Apollo Forte
- Cinematography: Gordon Willis
- Edited by: Susan E. Morse
- Color process: Black and white
- Production companies: Jack Rollins & Charles H. Joffe Productions
- Distributed by: Orion Pictures
- Release date: January 27, 1984
- Running time: 84 minutes
- Country: United States
- Language: English
- Budget: $8 million
- Box office: $10,600,497

Broadway Danny Rose is a 1984 American black-and-white comedy film written and directed by Woody Allen. It follows a hapless theatrical agent who, by helping a client, becomes entangled in a love triangle involving the mob. The film stars Allen as the titular character, as well as Mia Farrow and Nick Apollo Forte.

Broadway Danny Rose was screened out of competition at the 1984 Cannes Film Festival and received positive reviews from critics. It has been ranked among Allen's stronger films, with Farrow's performance receiving particular praise.

== Plot ==
The story of Danny Rose is told in flashback, an anecdote shared amongst a group of comedians over lunch at New York's Carnegie Deli.

Danny's one-man talent agency represents numerous unorthodox, unsuccessful entertainers, including faded lounge lizard Lou Canova, whose career is on the rebound. Although willing to represent almost anyone, Danny works extremely hard for his acts, often attending to their personal and professional needs. On the rare occasions that any of his acts succeed, they invariably leave him for more professional representation.

Lou, who has a wife and three children, is having an affair with a woman, Tina, who had previously dated a gangster who is still in love with her. Lou wants her to accompany him to an important engagement Danny has arranged for him at the Waldorf Astoria, where he will perform in front of Milton Berle, who could potentially hire him for larger engagements.

At Lou's insistence, Danny acts as a "beard," masquerading as Tina's boyfriend to divert attention from the affair. Tina's ex-boyfriend is jealous and, believing Tina's relationship with Danny to be real, orders a hit on Danny, who finds himself in danger of losing both his client and his life. The ex-boyfriend's brothers find Danny and Tina and hold them in an abandoned warehouse.

Held at gunpoint, Danny claims that Tina's real boyfriend is a talentless ventriloquist. While the gangsters search for the supposed boyfriend, Danny and Tina narrowly escape; Danny tells Tina that the ventriloquist is on a cruise and therefore temporarily safe. They eventually arrive at the Waldorf, only to find Lou drunk and unprepared for his performance. Using a concoction he has developed over the years, Danny sobers up Lou. As a result, Lou delivers a successful performance, after which he tells Danny that he plans to sign with a more professional manager. Tina, having previously urged Lou to drop Danny, refuses to speak up on Danny's behalf despite their experiences together.

Danny, feeling cheated, goes to the Carnegie Deli where he hears that the ventriloquist he "ratted on" to save himself was beaten up by the hit men (the cruise had been cancelled) and is now in the hospital. Danny goes to the hospital to console the victim and pays his hospital bills.

Lou, who has left his wife and children to marry Tina, becomes a success. Tina, feeling guilty for not standing up for Danny, becomes depressed, and the couple eventually split up. On Thanksgiving, Danny hosts a party for all of his clients. Tina arrives at the door and apologizes, asking Danny to remember his uncle Sidney's motto, "acceptance, forgiveness, and love." At first Danny turns Tina away, but he later catches up with her and they appear to reconcile. During this closing shot, the voiceover of the group of comedians telling the story is heard. They praise Danny and say that he was eventually awarded Broadway's highest honor: a sandwich at the Carnegie Deli was named after him.

== Cast ==
- Woody Allen - Danny Rose
- Mia Farrow - Tina Vitale
- Nick Apollo Forte - Lou Canova
- Sandy Baron - Himself
- Corbett Monica - Himself
- Jackie Gayle - Himself
- Morty Gunty - Himself
- Will Jordan - Himself
- Howard Storm - Himself
- Gloria Parker - Impresario of the Musical Glasses
- Jack Rollins - Himself
- Milton Berle - Himself
- Howard Cosell - Himself
- Joe Franklin - Himself
- Gerald Schoenfeld - Sid Bacharach
- Craig Vandenburgh - Ray Webb
- Herb Reynolds - Barney Dunn
- Edwin Bordo - Johnny Rispoli
- Gina DeAngelis - Johnny's mother
- Paul Greco - Vito Rispoli
- Frank Renzulli - Joe Rispoli

Steve Rossi claimed he was offered the Lou Canova role but that Allen reneged when he was told that the film would be known as an Allen and Rossi film. Robert De Niro and Sylvester Stallone both turned down the role.

== Soundtrack ==
- Agita - Written and Performed by Nick Apollo Forte
- My Bambina - Written and Performed by Nick Apollo Forte
- Funiculi, Funicula (1880) (uncredited) - Music by Luigi Denza
- The Band Played On (1895) (uncredited) - Music by Chas. B. Ward
- All of You (1957) (uncredited) - Music and Lyrics by Cole Porter
- You're Nobody till Somebody Loves You (1944) (uncredited) - Written by Russ Morgan, Larry Stock, and James Cavanaugh
- Torna a Surriento (Return to Sorrento)(1902) (uncredited) - Music by Ernesto De Curtis
- Begin the Beguine (1935) - Music by Cole Porter
- Ciribiribin - Music by Alberto Pestalozza - Lyrics by Carlo Tiochet

== Reception ==
=== Box office ===
Broadway Danny Rose opened on January 27, 1984, in 109 North American theatres, grossing $953,794 ($8,750 per screen) in its opening weekend. When it expanded to 613 theatres on February 17, it grossed $2,083,455 that weekend ($3,398 per screen). Its total domestic gross was $10,600,497, against an $8 million budget.

=== Critical response ===
Broadway Danny Rose received a positive reception from critics. It holds a 100% positive "Fresh" rating from critics on Rotten Tomatoes based on 28 reviews, with a weighted average of 8.1/10. The site's consensus reads: "Woody Allen's hard-working, uphill-climbing Broadway talent agent is rendered memorably with equal parts absurdity and affection."

Roger Ebert of the Chicago Sun-Times awarded the film three and a half stars out of four, praising Allen, Forte, and Farrow, whom he described as "the real treasure among the performances." Janet Maslin of The New York Times described Danny Rose as "one of the funniest and most touching characters Mr. Allen has yet created" and added, "Broadway Danny Rose [...] proceeds so sweetly and so illogically that it seems to have been spun, not constructed." Time Out praised the combination of style and substance, stating, "The jokes are firmly embedded in plot and characterisation, and the film, shot by Gordon Willis in harsh black-and-white, looks terrific; but what makes it work so well is the unsentimental warmth pervading every frame."

Revisiting the film in 2001, Jonathan Rosenbaum of the Chicago Reader called it his "favorite Allen picture," and wrote that the title character "registers with such power and poignancy" because "like John Updike’s most memorable character, Rabbit Angstrom, Danny Rose is a significant part of his creator but also his ostensible opposite, the phantom that haunts his sleep — a creation based on what [Allen] left behind when he moved away from the boondocks and became a professional success, which gives this character a moral force and authenticity that’s missing from Allen’s other heroes."

In a 2016 poll of Time Out contributors, Broadway Danny Rose was ranked Allen's sixth greatest film, with editor Joshua Rothkopf praising "Mia Farrow's brassy Italian ballbuster, a wild transformation you’ll never forget." Sam Fragoso of IndieWire also lauded Farrow's "wonderfully out-of-type performance" and listed the work as a highlight of Allen's career. The Daily Telegraph film critics Robbie Collin and Tim Robey named it the director's ninth best effort, praising Farrow's acting and the writing that made the film's titular character "one of Woody’s most snugly tailored roles: instantly funny, a little sad, and right up at the most endearing end of the characters he’s played."

In October 2013, Broadway Danny Rose was voted by Guardian readers as the fifth best film directed by Allen.

=== Accolades ===
Award	Category	Subject	Result
57th Academy Awards	Best Director	Woody Allen	Nominated
57th Academy Awards	Best Original Screenplay	Woody Allen	Nominated
BAFTA Awards	Best Original Screenplay	Woody Allen	Won
David di Donatello Award	Best Foreign Screenplay	Woody Allen	Won
David di Donatello Award	Best Foreign Actress	Mia Farrow	Nominated
Golden Globe Award	Best Actress – Motion Picture Comedy or Musical	Mia Farrow	Nominated
WGA Awards	Best Original Screenplay	Woody Allen	Won

== Release ==
=== Home media ===
Broadway Danny Rose was released through MGM Home Entertainment on DVD on November 6, 2001. A limited edition Blu-ray of 3,000 units was released by Twilight Time on April 8, 2014.

== Legacy ==
Actor Alec Baldwin has said that he has, with some regularity, "hosted parties where the only activity is just watching Broadway Danny Rose together".

The Safdie brothers have both mentioned it as among their favorite films.

The

The Marvelous Mrs. Maisel episode "The Testi-Roastial" (2023) was inspired by the film.

== See also ==
- "Pepino the Italian Mouse"
