= Albert Alter =

American clown (born 1947/48)

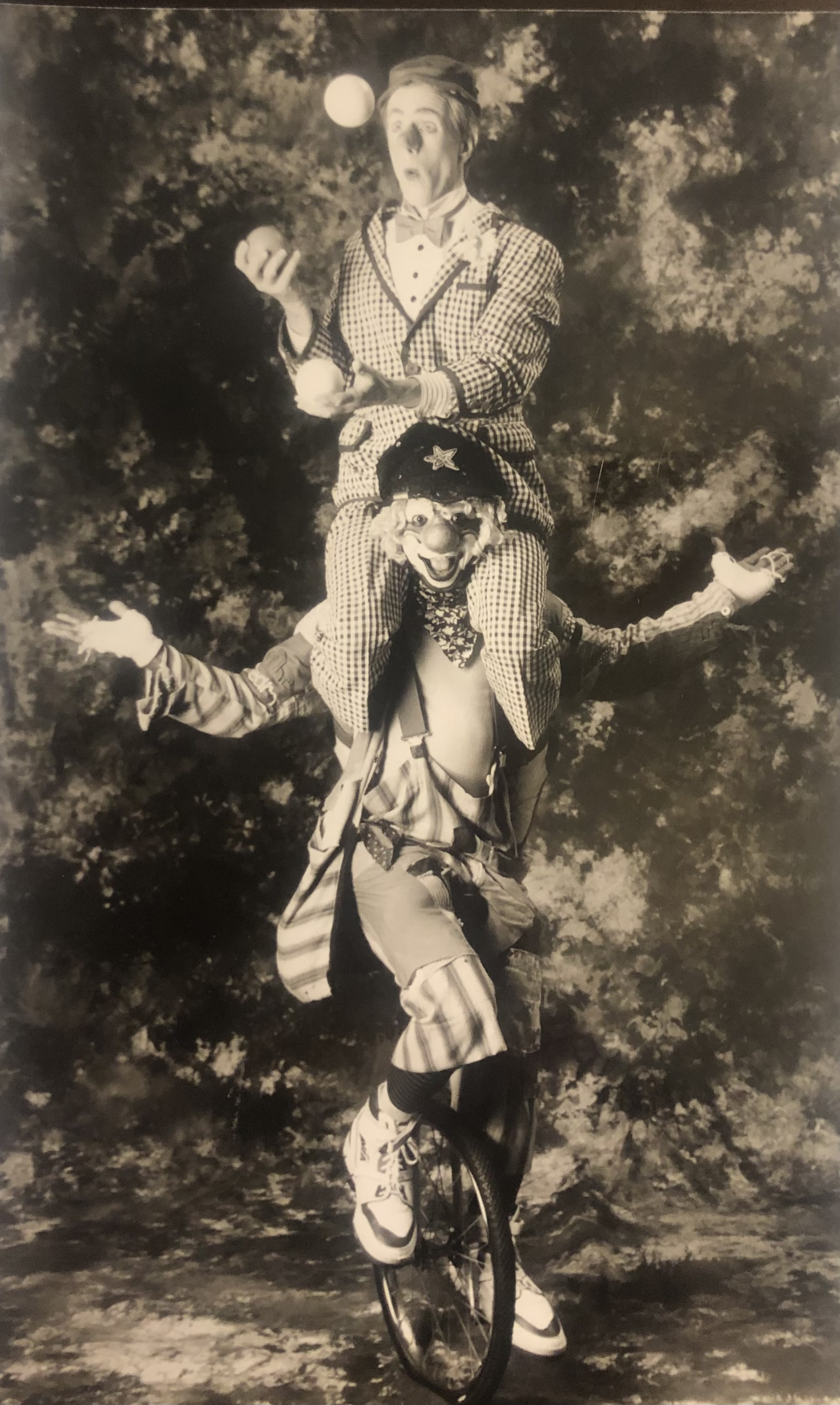
Albert Alter (top) performing with Skeeter Reece in 1991

Albert "Clem" Alter (born 1947 or 1948) is an American clown, noted for his work as a hospital clown. He is also a mime.

Alter was raised in Greeneville, Tennessee, and graduated from the University of Notre Dame in 1969. During the Vietnam War, he was a conscientious objector, and worked with the Catholic Relief Services in Vietnam 1971–1973. He worked as a chemical engineer until 1977, saying later that there was more to life than making money for a million-dollar corporation, and in 1981 he graduated from the Ringling Bros. and Barnum & Bailey Clown College. Since 1985, he has been teaching with Young Audiences of Oregon, an organization that promotes arts in education.

He toured with the Ringling Bros. and Barnum & Bailey Circus, took part in establishing a clown college in Tokyo, and has performed and taught internationally. In 1994, Alter was the opening act together with Skeeter Reece (as "Alter and Reece") at a Britt Music Festival with the Smothers Brothers. Alter and Reece also worked as hospital clowns together, and Alter has performed at hospitals like the Doernbecher Children's Hospital, the Floating Hospital for Children and Randall Children's Hospital. In 1991, he said that

One day I was showing [a child cancer patient] a magic trick, the "cut and restore" rope trick, and her doctor walked into the room. She started shouting at the doctor, "Get out of here! I'm learning magic!" The Doctor just looked at me and then he looked at her and said, "I'll be back." I saw the doctor later in the hall and I started to apologize, but he stopped me and said, "No, No, you are exactly what she needs.

In the 90s, he was part of the BoZoArtZ musical group, and was the northwest regional vice president of Clowns of America International. As of 2016, he lives in Portland, Oregon.
