= Nick Apollo Forte =

American musician and actor (1938–2020)

- Born: Nicola Antonio Forte; June 14, 1938; Waterbury, Connecticut
- Died: February 26, 2020 (aged 81); Waterbury, Connecticut
- Other names: Nicky Redman; Apollo Forte
- Occupations: Lounge singer; Actor
- Notable work: Broadway Danny Rose

Nick Apollo Forte (born Nicola Antonio Forte; June 14, 1938 – February 26, 2020) was an American musician and actor.

== Early life ==
Forte was born in Waterbury, Connecticut. His first stage name was Nicky Redman. He changed his name to include "Apollo" after his first big break, performing second to Della Reese at the Apollo Theatre at 18.

After many years of singing in lounges and producing and distributing his own records, a casting agent for Woody Allen saw the cover of the Nick Apollo album Images in a record store on Broadway. After a screen test, Allen cast Forte as Lou Canova in his 1984 film Broadway Danny Rose. At this point, Forte adjusted his stage name to Nick Apollo Forte, which he used for the rest of his career.

Forte received third billing in Broadway Danny Rose, and his work received positive reviews. Forte also performed two of his original songs in the film ("Agita" and "My Bambina"), alongside some classic American Songbook material.

Forte appeared on Johnny Carson's Tonight Show on February 16, 1984.

== Career ==
Forte was cast in a TV pilot, Mr. Success, in which he played a "loveable shlump" who worked in a department store. Although the show was tailor-made for Forte, the program was beset by problems, and he was replaced by James Coco. (The pilot aired on CBS on June 23, 1984, but did not sell.) Forte returned to working lounges, but made a few screen appearances in subsequent years: a guest spot on The Ellen Burstyn Show in 1987 and the Showtime series Billions in 2016.

Forte spent most of his time with his family and fishing. He sang his famous songs and played music, and was known to sing sea shanties as well while dancing the jig. He was well known for his radio commercials for Goodyear Tires.

== Family ==
In 1958, he married Rosalie Trapasso, who worked at the shoe store he managed after he dropped out of high school. They were married over 60 years and had seven children and 22 grandchildren.

He died on February 26, 2020.
