= Josephine Barstow =

English operatic soprano (born 1940)

Dame Josephine Barstow DBE
- Born: 27 September 1940 (age 85); Sheffield, West Riding of Yorkshire, England
- Education: University of Birmingham
- Occupation: Opera singer
- Spouses: Terry Hands (m. 1964; div. 1967) Ande Anderson (m. 1968; death 1996)

Dame Josephine Clare Barstow, DBE (born 27 September 1940) is an English operatic soprano.

== Education and early career ==
Josephine Barstow was born in Sheffield and educated at the University of Birmingham. She made her professional debut (Mimì in La bohème) with the touring company Opera for All in 1964. She won a scholarship to study during 1965–66 at the London Opera Centre, where she met her husband Ande Anderson (d. 1996). During the following season, she sang Gluck's Euridice and Verdi's Violetta for the Sadler's Wells Opera Company and in 1968 she began a three-year contract with Welsh National Opera. In 1969 she made her Royal Opera debut as one of the nieces in Peter Grimes.

== Subsequent career ==
Among other roles with the Royal Opera, she has sung Alice Ford (Falstaff), Santuzza (Cavalleria rusticana), Ellen Orford in Peter Grimes, Leonore (Fidelio) and the Old Countess (The Queen of Spades). She also appeared in the world premières of two operas by Sir Michael Tippett: The Knot Garden (as Denise) and The Ice Break (as Gayle).

At Glyndebourne, she has appeared as Lady Macbeth, Elettra (Idomeneo) and Leonore. Roles with English National Opera include an acclaimed Violetta, Emilia Marty (The Makropulos Case), Natasha in the British stage première of War and Peace and the title roles in Salome, Aida, Arabella, Lady Macbeth of Mtsensk and Der Rosenkavalier. Rehearsals for Salome and an interview with Barstow were featured in a December 1975 episode of the BBC television programme Arena. For her performance as Jeanne in the UK premiere of The Devils of Loudun at the London Coliseum in 1973 with Geoffrey Chard, were reported as "among the most remarkable on our postwar operatic stage. The enormous vocal range and the comparably enormous range of movement and gesture were welded into faultless wholes".

Among other engagements outside the British Isles, she has appeared at the New York Metropolitan Opera, Lyric Opera of Chicago, the Vienna State Opera and the Bayreuth Festival.

Latterly, she has performed a number of roles with Opera North, including Alice Ford, Lady Macbeth, Kostelnicka in Jenůfa, Marie in Wozzeck, Lady Billows in Albert Herring and in the title roles of Gloriana, Médée and Aida. Also for Opera North in 2021 (revived 2022) she sang, and spoke, the role of Madame Armfeldt in A Little Night Music by Stephen Sondheim.

On 22 March 1986 Barstow reprised her role as Salome, this time at the Seattle Opera House, performing the Dance of the Seven Veils. She danced a choreography by Mark Morris, wearing a costume designed by Sarah Nash Gates, involving the literal removal of seven veils. At the end of the number Barstow was wearing only a G-string.

On 16 November 1986 Barstow performed an opera gala night for Opera North with David Lloyd Jones as conductor.

In October 2011 she appeared as the Countess in The Queen of Spades, also with Opera North. She reprised the role at The Grange Festival's production in 2023.

Barstow played Heidi Schiller in the National Theatre's 2017 production of Stephen Sondheim's Follies.

== Selected recordings ==
=== CDs ===
- Albert Herring (conductor Steuart Bedford), 1996, Naxos
- Un ballo in maschera (conductor Herbert von Karajan), 1989, DG
- Gloriana (conductor Charles Mackerras), 1993, Decca
- The Knot Garden (conductor Colin Davis), 1974, Philips
- Kiss Me, Kate (conductor John McGlinn), EMI
- Oliver! (conductor John Owen Edwards), JAY Records
- Street Scene (conductor John Mauceri), 1991, Decca
- Opera Finales (Salome, Médée, The Makropulos Affair, Turandot) (conductor John Mauceri), 1990, Decca

=== DVDs ===
- Un ballo in maschera (conductor Sir Georg Solti), 2005, TDK
- Gloriana (conductor Paul Daniel), 2000, Opus Arte
- Idomeneo (conductor John Pritchard), 1974, Arthaus Musik
- Macbeth (conductor John Pritchard), 1972, Arthaus Musik
- Owen Wingrave (conductor Kent Nagano), 2001, Arthaus Musik

== Honours ==
Appointed a Commander of the Order of the British Empire (CBE) in the 1985 New Year Honours, Josephine Barstow was promoted to Dame Commander of the Order of the British Empire (DBE) in the 1995 Birthday Honours.

Dame Josephine Barstow is currently represented by Musichall Ltd.

== Bibliography ==
- Who's Who in British Opera; ed. Nicky Adam (Scolar Press, 1993); ISBN 0-85967-894-6
