= Morty Gunty =

American actor (1929-1984)

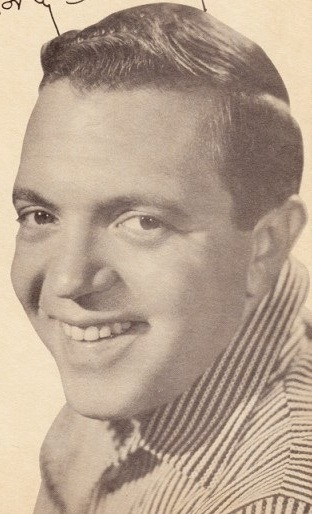
- Morty Gunty on The Ed Sullivan Show in 1964
- Born: February 1, 1929; New York City, U.S.
- Died: July 15, 1984 (aged 55); New York City, U.S.
- Education: Brooklyn College
- Occupations: Comedian, actor
- Known for: New York City nightclub comedy The Ed Sullivan Show appearance preceding the Beatles (1964); Host of The Funny Company on WOR-TV; Playing himself in Broadway Danny Rose
- Spouse: Marilyn Gunty

Morty Gunty (February 1, 1929 – July 15, 1984) was an American actor and comedian, a well-known New York City nightclub comic in the 1960s and 1970s.

Gunty attended Midwood High School and Brooklyn College in Brooklyn, New York. He was born and died in the Parkville section of Brooklyn.

In 1948, less than three months before his 20th birthday, Gunty appeared on Ted Mack’s Original Amateur Hour, performing a Danny Kaye-style one-man sketch. The performance earned him an on-air offer to appear in an upcoming travelling show.

Gunty appeared on The Ed Sullivan Show on February 23, 1964, leading into the Beatles before their third and final appearance on the program.

In addition to being a nightclub comic, in the mid-1960s, he hosted a 90-minute weekday afternoon children's television series on WOR-TV New York called The Funny Company. Gunty also appeared on Broadway in 1967. He played Buddy Sorrell in the original pilot for The Dick Van Dyke Show, which was entitled Head of the Family and starred writer/creator Carl Reiner in the lead role with an entirely different cast. He also played Ann Marie's agent, a former comedian, in several episodes of That Girl. He played himself in the Woody Allen film Broadway Danny Rose.

== Death ==
Gunty died of cancer on July 15, 1984, aged 55, in Brooklyn, New York. He was survived by his wife, Marilyn; two daughters, a brother; and his parents, Belle and Abraham Gunty.

== Filmography ==
Year	Title	Role	Notes
1968	What's So Bad About Feeling Good?	Sgt. Gunty	
1984	Broadway Danny Rose	Morty Gunty	(final film role)
