= Ringling Bros. and Barnum & Bailey Clown College =

Circus school (1968–1997)

- Type: Private vocational
- Active: 1968–1997
- Founder: Irvin Feld
- Parent institution: Ringling Bros. and Barnum & Bailey Circus
- Location: Venice, Florida (1968–1993); Baraboo, Wisconsin (1993–1995); Sarasota, Florida (1995–1997)

Ringling Bros. and Barnum & Bailey Clown College was an American circus school which trained around 1,400 clowns in the "Ringling style" from its founding in 1968 until its closure in 1997.

== History ==
Clown College was the brainchild of Irvin Feld, the owner of Ringling Bros. and Barnum & Bailey Circus, and longtime Ringling clown and front man Bill Ballantine. In 1968, Ringling had only a handful of clowns, most of them over fifty years of age. It was clear that these performers would not be able to go on forever. But there was a dearth of suitable replacements at that time. So Feld decided to create a school to train a new generation in this ancient art form.

Feld also saw the potential public relations opportunity in having a place that could become the Mecca of clowning in the United States. In addition, he wanted to use the school as another way of keeping his show more attractive to audiences than his competition, and have a place where he could guarantee getting an endless supply of new talent.

Circus World was planned in September 1972 to have the clown college's campus on site.

In 1984, after Feld's death, Kenneth Feld, his son, took over production of Feld Entertainment and the Ringling shows. In 1993, the clown college was moved from the Venice Arena to Baraboo, Wisconsin. He continued to operate the school through the 1997 session, and then closed Clown College because it was no longer necessary: with nearly fifteen hundred graduates, many of whom were teaching others the lessons they had learned, and with a home videotape produced by Ringling and made at Clown College in 1986 titled "Be A Clown", which featured many of the techniques used in the school's training sessions, Ringling Bros and Barnum & Bailey Circus officially discontinued their Clown College just shy of its 30th year.

Two notable national events took place involving Ringling Bros. and Barnum & Bailey Clown College. The first occurred on February 17, 1988, when CBS Television broadcast the Ringling Bros. and Barnum & Bailey Clown College: 20th Anniversary special. This hour long program was hosted by Dick Van Dyke and it featured a cadre of clown alumni, performing their favorite routines, as well as Van Dyke, in character as the school custodian "Burford", who was trying to pick up some of the "course material" on the sly.

The second was on August 4, 1992, when Ringling created "Smiles Across America", an event done locally in cities and towns across the country to raise awareness of various issues and to help make people happier. Clown College graduates performed such civic duties as visiting hospitals and parks and appeared for photo ops and did "meet & greet" with the media and the general public.

Van Dyke and long time Today Show weatherman Willard Scott, the first person to portray Ronald McDonald in a television advertisement, are both honorary graduates of the school.

After 25 years the college moved from Venice, Florida to Baraboo, Wisconsin, hometown of the Ringling Bros. After three years in Baraboo, the clown college operated at the Sarasota Opera House in Sarasota until 1998 before the program was suspended. The college continued to operate after closing the facility, albeit in a different form. It was run in different locales in and around Rosemont, Illinois until 2015. In 2017, the Ringling Bros. and Barnum & Bailey Circus folded, but returned in 2023, no longer featuring any animal performances.

== Operation ==
Clown College was a unique institution for several reasons. First, the method to apply to the school was an extensive written personality profile that gave the directors an opportunity to have an understanding of the applicant's psychology, interests and previous experience. The circus also held in-person auditions at most stops along the route to drum up interest in the show and to get a range of people from all over the United States to apply.

Next, tuition was free (though students were responsible for their own room and board, as well as any other incidental expenses incurred), and a graduate from the school finished the term with a full "Agent Suit" or specific clown costume, including a wig and proper clown shoes and a complete make-up kit, as well as the training needed to be a good clown performer.

Each yearly session was held in the fall. The number of students admitted to any year's session varied but it ranged from thirty to fifty, with the vast majority being men. The ratio of men to women in a Clown College class was roughly 8 to 1.

The Clown College session over the years ranged from approximately thirteen weeks down to ten and a half weeks before it was eventually scaled back to an eight-week course in its final years. Students would work together or "play off" each other 8 hours a day, six days a week preparing material for the "Big Show" (Clown College served as a think tank to create new gags for the circus) and learning all of the basics of clowning. Typical classes included make-up application, costume design, acrobatics, juggling, stilt walking, pantomime and other skills training. Films of classic performers like Charlie Chaplin, Buster Keaton, and The Three Stooges were studied, as were the cartoon work of Wile E. Coyote and Bugs Bunny.

The entire session was one long audition for the Ringling Bros. and Barnum & Bailey Circus, as the instructors took note of which students had what they were looking for to fill the positions for the new season's show, which began several weeks after the Clown College session ended. Chosen graduates received a one-year contract to travel with "The Greatest Show on Earth", which they were obliged to accept. (This was Ringling's only stipulation for all students who agreed to receive the school's free training, but was only added after several students declined job offers at the end of the session. The first two to do so were Penn Jillette and Bill Irwin in 1973 and 1974, respectively.) Grads not selected to tour were often given opportunities to perform in other capacities within the Feld Organization, sometimes were added to the show's clown alley at a later date, or became a member of any of a collection of other circuses that sought well-trained clowns for their shows.

== Clown style ==
The particular "Ringling Style" of clowning taught at Clown College was rooted in the American type of clown performance, with an accent towards broad and slapstick type humor, as opposed to the European approach which was typically more subtle. Because of the "three ring" configuration of the Ringling show, and the bigger arenas that were needed to present such an attraction, audiences were larger and many patrons sat in balconies or upper decks, far above the action. In order to reach the people in every area of these larger arenas, clowns on the Ringling show had to design their makeup to be seen at a distance, and use their props and clear physical movements to show the audience what was happening during a gag, no matter where in the house they were seated. The training given here was tailored for the Ringling show, but could be transferred to other circus styles.

== Notable alumni ==
- Albert Alter
- Steven Banks
- Morton Dean (honorary degree)
- Bill Irwin
- Penn Jillette (1973 graduate)
- Michael Goudeau
- Steve-O (1997 graduate)
- Steve "TJ Tatters" Smith
- David Strathairn
- Greg and Karen DeSanto
- Boswick The Clown
- Michael Davis
- Skeeter Reece

== Instructors ==
- Bill Irwin
- Lou Jacobs
- Barry Lubin
- Philippe Petit
- Rob Mermin
- Glen "Frosty" Little
- Sarah Nash Gates (costume design, Class of 1976)

== Directors ==
- Mel Miller
- Bill Ballantine
- Steve "TJ Tatters" Smith
