= Skeeter Reece =

American clown (born 1950/51)

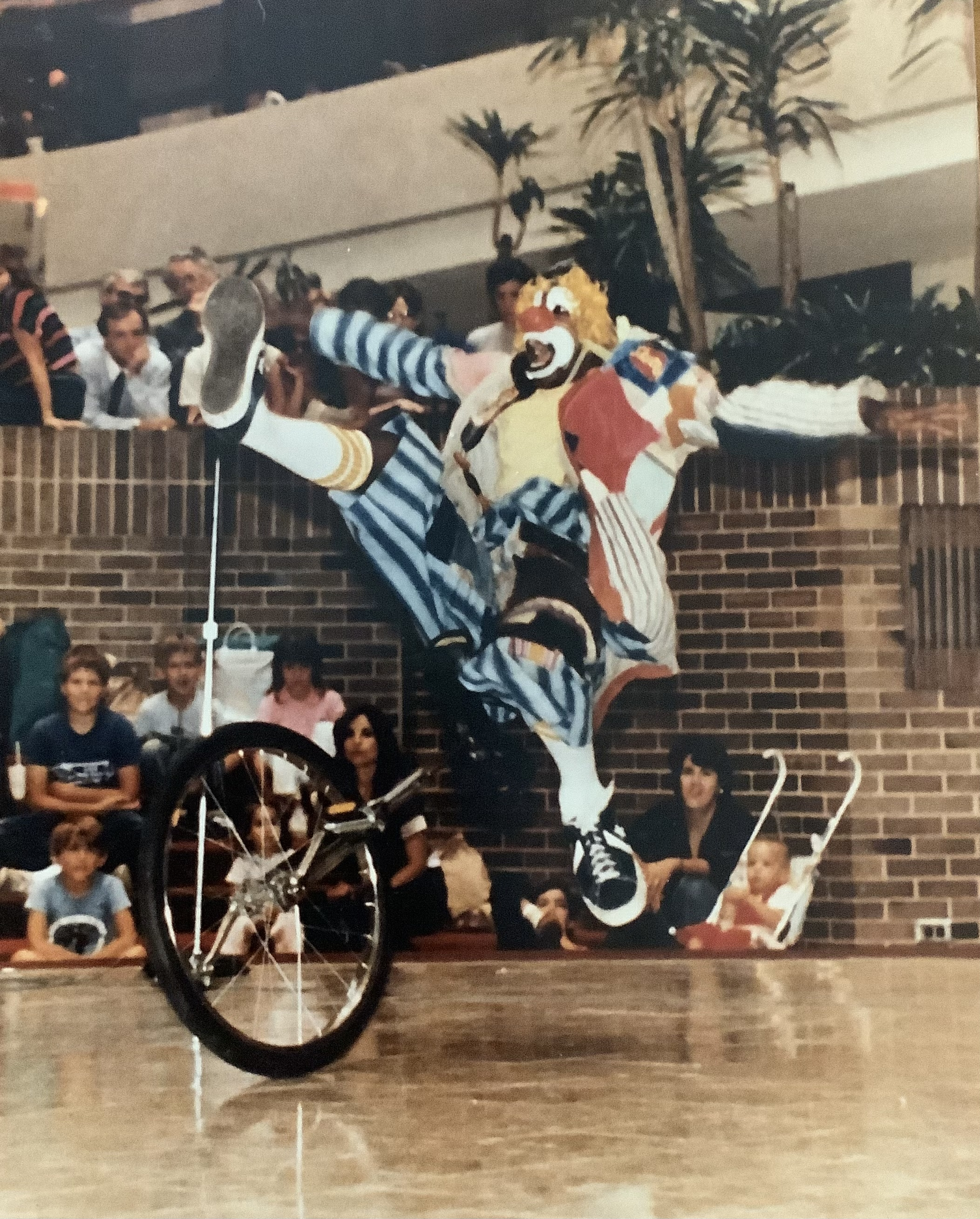
- Skeeter Reece performing in 1983
- Born: Zachary Reece; 1950 or 1951 (age 74–75); St. Petersburg, Florida, U.S.
- Education: Theodore Roosevelt High School, Ringling Bros. and Barnum & Bailey Clown College
- Occupation: Clown
- Military career
- Branch: United States Army
- War: Vietnam War

Zachary "Skeeter" Reece (born 1950 or 1951) is an American clown. He became a clown in the 1970s after serving in the Vietnam War, and was one of very few Black clowns in the US at the time.

== Early life ==
Reece was born in St. Petersburg, Florida, and raised in the Bronx in New York City. His parents were Amos, a construction worker, and Ella Mae, who worked in the public school system. They had five children. His grandmother nicknamed him "Skeeter" since he was small as newborn.

He spent his childhood in both cities, describing his life in St. Petersburg as "pre-civil rights ... all Black people ... very segregated." In contrast, New York was "a whole different world. White kids, Spanish kids – living in our building!" This, he says, made him a "chameleon", adapting to both environments. In Florida with his grandmother, he was a good kid; in New York, he would act out and steal.

He went to Theodore Roosevelt High School in the Bronx, played basketball and ran track. He later found the athletic experience useful in clowning. He also learned how to unicycle. Jerry King, a Bronx local, encouraged kids like Reece to unicycle instead of criminal activity. This initiative would lead to the formation of the King Charles Troupe of performing unicyclists.

== Army ==
Reece joined the army, and spent 22 months in Vietnam, saying, "In Vietnam, I was a Black Revolutionary." He had enjoyed military life in the US, but in Vietnam he saw American soldiers hurting Vietnamese children, and went absent without leave (AWOL). His discharge from the army was later reclassified as honorable.

Returning to America at age 21, he later described himself as being in a terrible state, hating America, white people and the establishment. He started "preaching the Black Revolution". His family, worried about him, suggested he could move to Florida where his grandparents lived to calm down, which he did.

== Clowning ==
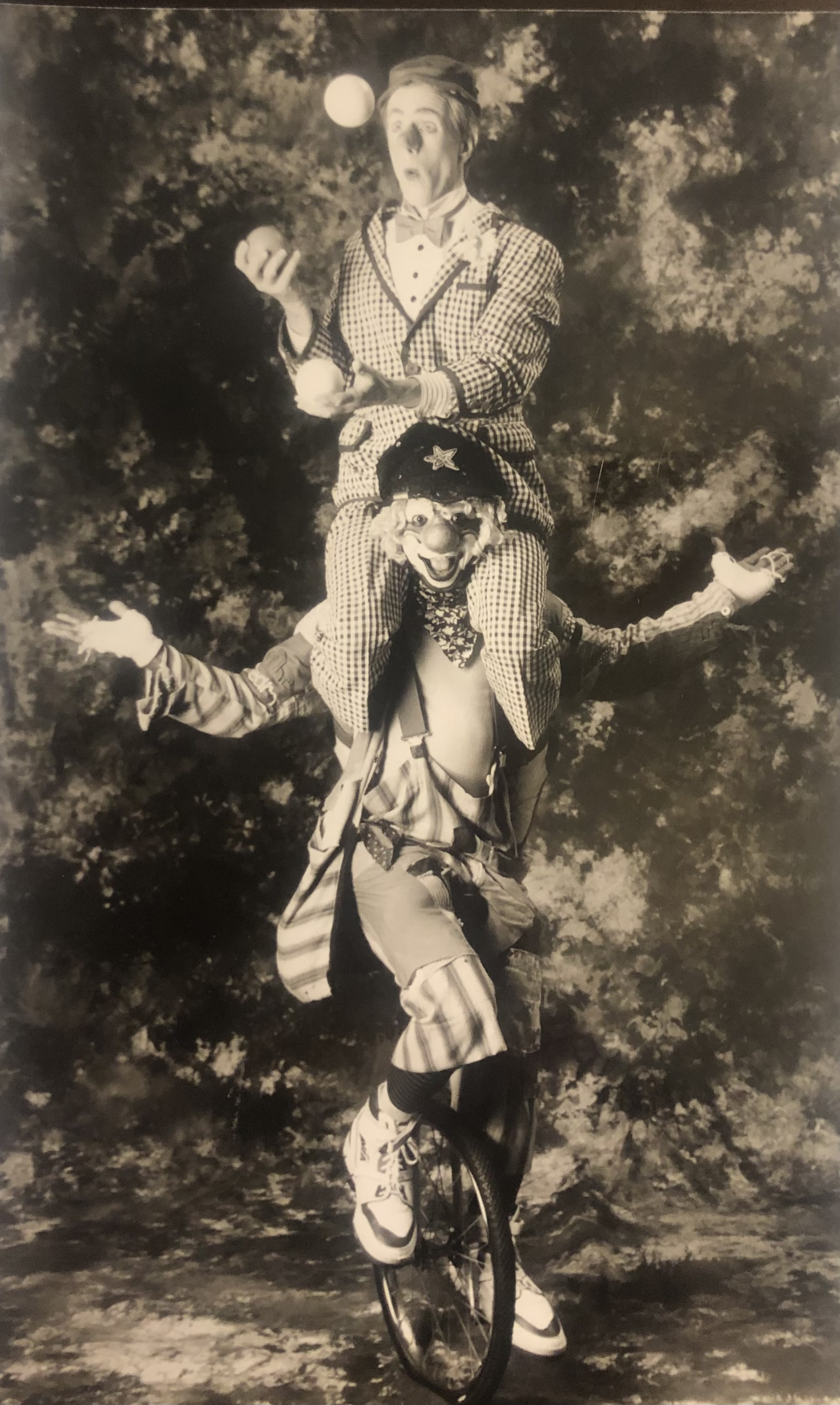
Alter and Reece (bottom), performing in 1991

In Florida, he had a chance meeting with a cousin who was a member of the King Charles Troupe, and Reece, who was familiar with the troupe from New York, was invited to join. The multi-racial and friendly environment at the circus had a great impact on his outlook on life. In 1975, Reece joined some clowns in an improvised performance at a Thanksgiving dinner. The clowns had put makeup on him, and Reece felt that this was what he wanted to do. In 1977 he attended Ringling Bros. and Barnum & Bailey Clown College, which accepted about 50 out of 3000 applicants a year, and became a professional clown. He would later return to the Clown College to teach. The unicycle became a part of his clown-act.

Comedian Rain Pryor tells in her memoir that Reece was her mother's boyfriend when Pryor was about nine years old (late 1970s). Her mother, who worked as a photographer for the Ringling Bros. and Barnum & Bailey Circus (Ringling), had introduced her to "the world of clowns". "Endlessly entertaining", Reece practiced magic tricks with her, they played games and he gave her a parakeet that she loved. When she drew a picture of "Skeeter" in school, a teacher told her "Now, Rain, you know there's no such thing as a black clown." Pryor insisted, but the teacher did not believe her. Pryor wanted Reece to come to school with her and prove her point, but he was traveling with the circus. Black circus performers were rare, and as of 1983, he was one of few Black clowns in the US.

He performed with the Ringling in venues like Madison Square Garden, the Spectrum, the Blue Cross Arena and the Federal Correctional Institution, El Reno. He left the Ringling in 1982. In 1983, he was performing with Circus Vargas as "Goodwill Ambassador". In 1987, he was part of a show called Jamboree at the Riviera in Las Vegas.

In 1994, Reece was the opening act together with Albert Alter (as "Alter and Reece") at a Britt Music Festival with the Smothers Brothers. Reece and Alter also worked as hospital clowns together. In 1996, he warmed up the crowd at a show with comedians Bobby Slayton and Nick Griffin in Las Vegas. In 2000, he performed as part of Clark County School District's Class Act program, as well as with the UniverSoul Circus, an as of 2000 all Black and Hispanic performers circus.

Reece is an Auguste clown, a silent character. In 2021 he said "I love my clown. That's just the way it is now. I know exactly who it is. ... I say 'my clown' because we're two different people."

== Gallery ==
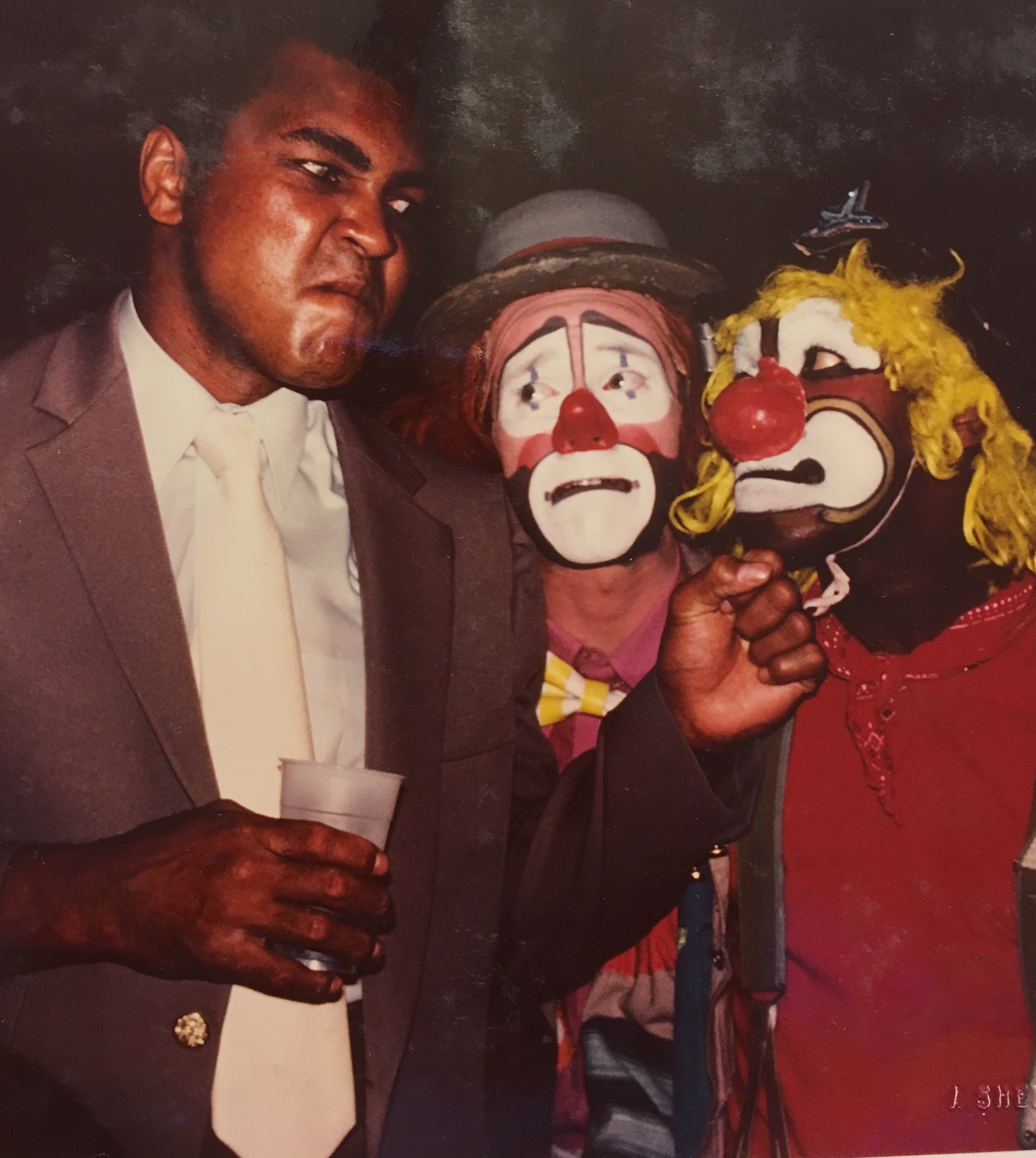
Muhammad Ali, Charlie Frye, and Reece in 1980

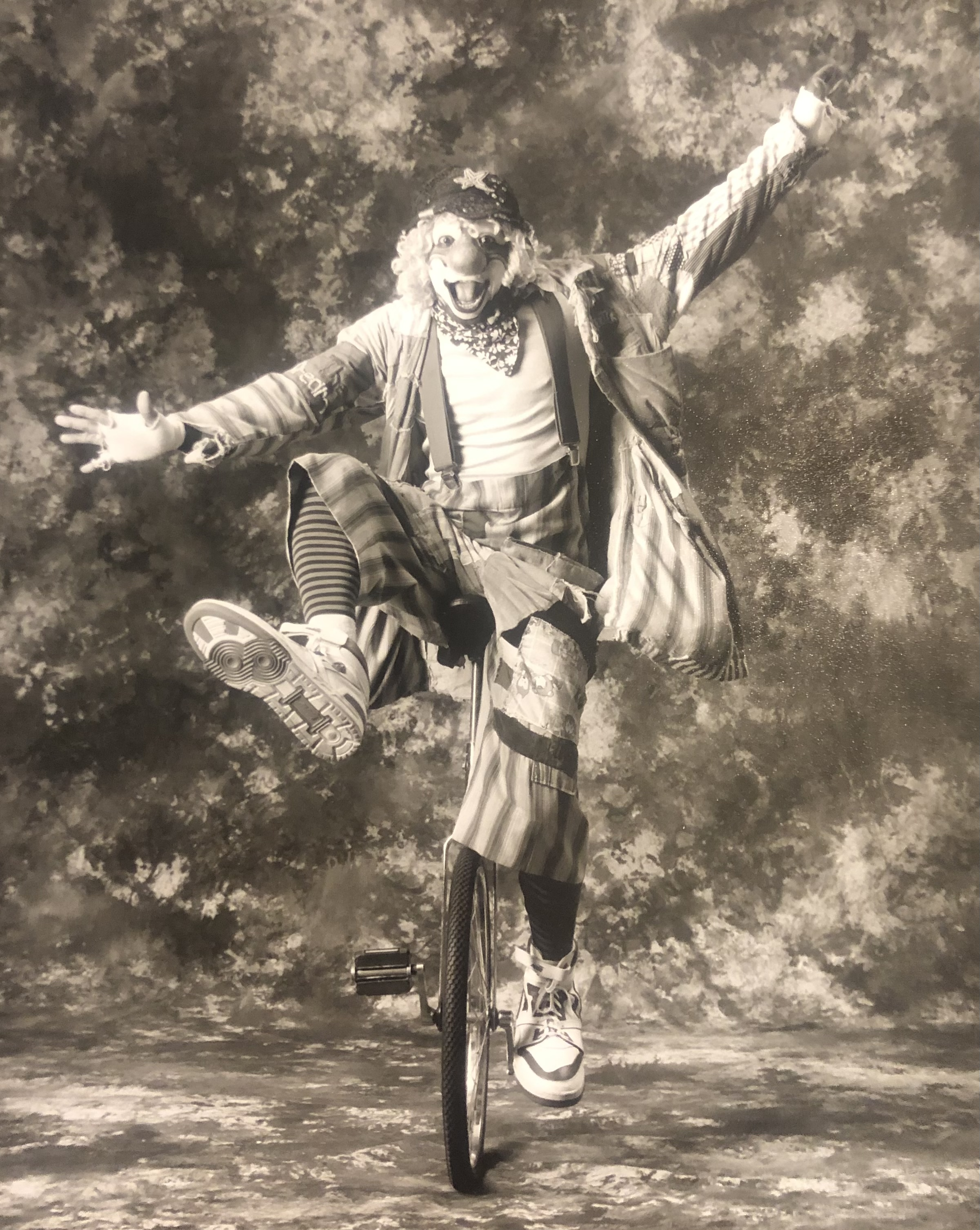
Reece in 1991

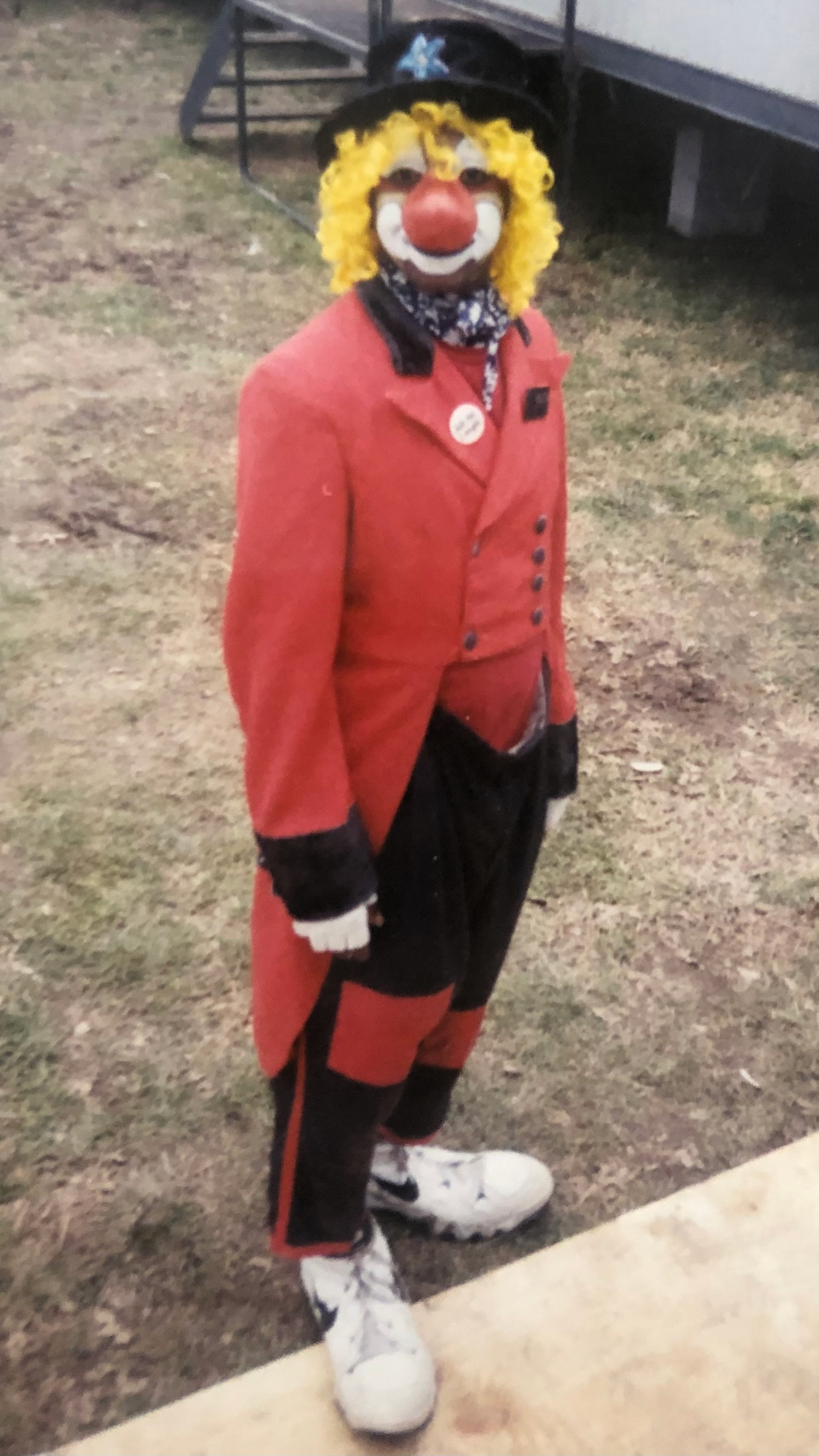
Reece in 1996
