= The Decatur Daily =

Newspaper in Alabama, US

- The December 7, 2006 front page of The Decatur Daily
- Type: Daily newspaper
- Format: Broadsheet
- Owner(s): Tennessee Valley Printing Co., Inc.
- Publisher: Barrett C. "Clint" Shelton III
- Editor: Eric Fleischauer
- Founded: 1912
- Headquarters: 201 1st Avenue SE; Decatur, Alabama 35609; United States
- Website: decaturdaily.com

The Decatur Daily is a daily (five days a week) newspaper serving Decatur, Alabama and the Tennessee Valley in the North Alabama area of the United States. As of September 30, 2006, it had an average daily circulation of 20,824 and a Sunday circulation of 23,840.

== History ==
It was first published on February 26, 1912, under the banner of The Decaturs Daily, serving the towns of Decatur and New Decatur. After 1916, when New Decatur was renamed Albany, the paper was called The Albany-Decatur Daily. When the two towns were consolidated in 1927, it assumed its present title.

The newspaper is published by the Tennessee Valley Printing Co., Inc., formed in 1911. William R. Shelton was the primary owner and first publisher. He served in this capacity until his death in 1924, and was succeeded by his son Barrett C. Shelton Sr. Barrett C. Shelton Jr. has been publisher since 1984, and Barrett C. "Clint" Shelton III today serves as general manager.

On April 1, 2009, The Tennessee Valley Printing Company purchased the TimesDaily newspaper in Florence, Alabama, from The New York Times Company.

In 2018, facing challenges from the switch to digital media and sharp increases in newsprint costs due to a tariff imposed on Canadian newsprint, 'The Decatur Daily' stopped printing editions on Saturdays and Mondays.
