= Daily Record (Washington) =

Daily newspaper published in Ellensburg, Washington

The Daily Record
- Type: Daily newspaper
- Owner: Adams MultiMedia
- Founder(s): William S. Zimmerman; J.C. "Cliff" Kaynor
- Founded: July 12, 1883
- Relaunched: July 1, 1909
- Language: English
- Headquarters: Ellensburg, Washington
- Circulation: 2,619 (as of 2020)
- ISSN: 2834-1872
- OCLC number: 17308766
- Website: dailyrecordnews.com

The Daily Record is an American daily newspaper published in Ellensburg, Washington. The Record is published four days a week with an afternoon edition each Tuesday through Thursday and a weekend edition is delivered on Saturday mornings. It has a circulation of 2,619.

== History ==
On July 12, 1883, the first edition of the Kittitas County Localizer was published by Stone & Adam. After the official founding of the town of Ellensburg, that paper became the Ellensburg Localizer. In 1898, F. Dorsey Schnebly became editor. He previously served as sheriff and participated in the capture of Chief Moses.

In 1903, Schnebly sold the paper to brothers Roy and M.E. Randall, publishers of the Cascade Miner of Roslyn, and Charles Fell, editor and manager of the CleElum Echo. In 1909, M.E. Randall sold the paper to William S. Zimmerman and J.C. "Clifford" Kaynor. At that time the daily edition was renamed to the Evening Record while the weekly edition continued under the Localizer name.

Zimmerman and Kaynor were previously reporters at the Seattle Post-Intelligencer. In 1912, Zimmerman sold his share to Kaynor and traveled to Chicago to study English. The Localizer was discontinued in 1918 due to a paper shortage caused by World War I. On April 23, 1938, the Evening Record was renamed to The Ellensburg Daily Record.

In 1958, Kaynor sold the Daily Record to James L. McGiffin, former advertising director of the Fairfield Ledger in Iowa. In 1959, Kaynor retired after publishing the paper for exactly 50 years. President Dwight D. Eisenhower wrote Kaynor a letter praising his career, which included time spent as president of the National Editorial Association.

In 1962, McGiffin sold the paper to Richard R. Lafromboise, office manager at The Olympian and owner-publisher of the North-Shore Citizen of Bothell. In 1966, Lafromboise sold the paper back to McGiffin, who since leaving the Daily Record had become editor and publisher of the Red Bluff Daily News, which Lafromboise owned, and bought the Paso Robles Press. On March 14, 1973, the paper was renamed to The Daily Record. In 1990, McGiffin died.

In August 1992, the newspaper was sold to McClatchy Newspapers Inc. At that time the paper's circulation was 6,000. In October 1996, the Daily Record was sold again to Pioneer News Group. In October 1999, the paper's Saturday edition was moved from afternoon to morning publication. In October 2017, Pioneer sold its media division assets, including the Daily Record, to the Adams Publishing Group.
