= TimesDaily =

American newspaper from Florence, Alabama

- Type: Daily newspaper
- Format: Broadsheet
- Owner(s): Tennessee Valley Printing Co., Inc.
- Publisher: Darrell Sandlin
- Editor: Gary Maitland
- Founded: 1890
- Headquarters: 219 W. Tennessee Street; Florence, Alabama 35630; United States
- Circulation: 28,900 (daily); 30,500 (Sunday)
- ISSN: 2998-3657
- OCLC number: 964829746
- Website: timesdaily.com

The TimesDaily is a daily newspaper published in Florence, Alabama. It covers a four-county region in Alabama, including Lauderdale, Colbert, Franklin, and Lawrence counties, as well as parts of southern Tennessee and northeast Mississippi. In addition to its editorial offices in Florence, the TimesDaily maintains a state capital bureau in Montgomery.

The newspaper is owned by the Tennessee Valley Printing Co., which also publishes The Decatur Daily. The TimesDaily has a twelve-month average circulation of 28,900 for daily editions and 30,500 for Sunday editions. Of the 25 daily newspapers published in Alabama, the TimesDaily has the seventh-highest daily circulation.

The TimesDaily was founded in 1889 as The Florence Times, publishing its first edition on July 4, 1890. A sister paper, The Tri-Cities Daily, was founded in 1907. The two newspapers merged in 1967, and were published for a time as The Florence Times—Tri-Cities Daily, which led to the current name TimesDaily.

In 1972, the TimesDaily was acquired by Worrell Newspapers. In 1982, The New York Times Company acquired eight daily newspapers, including the TimesDaily, from Worrell. The Tennessee Valley Printing Co. purchased the TimesDaily from the New York Times Regional Media Group in March 2009.
