= Marty Pollio =

American stand-up comedian and actor (born 1955)

- Born: February 22, 1955 (age 70); Louisville, Kentucky, U.S.
- Occupation(s): Stand-up comic, actor
- Website: www.1comedian.com

Marty Pollio (born February 22, 1955) is an American stand-up comedian and actor. He appeared twice on The Tonight Show Starring Johnny Carson and once in a skit on the show with Jay Leno. He also guest starred on several network sitcoms, including Night Court, Empty Nest and Blossom, in addition to co-starring in a CBS pilot produced by Dan Aykroyd, Mars Base One.

Born Martin Polio, he legally changed his last name to its original ethnic Italian spelling of Pollio. Raised in Louisville, Kentucky, Pollio is the son of the former Julia Tino, a homemaker and religious zealot, and Joseph Polio, a bookmaker and local racketeer who ran an after-hours gambling operation. As a teenager, his weekend job was delivering the "gifts" to cops and judges for his father.

After graduating from St. Xavier High School in Louisville, Pollio was in his third year of a four-year apprenticeship as an electrician when he quit on a whim to become an actor. While attending theatre classes at the University of Louisville, he studied movement theatre and mime with Avner Eisenberg (Avner the Eccentric) and later in Los Angeles with Israeli mime, Yaakov Noy. His performing career began in 1977 as a roving entertainer at the theme park, Opryland USA, in Nashville, TN. Once his act became choreographed to music, he started doing what he called, "bar mime." He performed his act, along with impressionist Bill Sacra, and magicians Mac King and Lance Burton in a Louisville landmark strip club named the Merry Go Round. Once the proliferation of comedy clubs began in the U.S., he adapted his show accordingly, but is still known more for his physical comedy than his stand-up.

Among other credits, Pollio was a movement instructor for the Tony Award winning company of National Theatre of the Deaf. He performed his one-man show Prisoners of Cheese at the Montreal Fringe Festival, and released a comedy/instructional video, How To Juggle and Other Cheap Tricks, which is widely distributed by View Video.
