= Michael Davis (juggler) =

American juggler (born 1953)

- Born: Michael Bruce Davis; August 23, 1953 (age 72); San Francisco, California, U.S.
- Occupations: Actor; comedian; juggler; singer
- Years active: 1979–present

Michael Bruce Davis (born August 23, 1953) is a comedic American juggler. He came to nationwide attention in the United States in the early 1980s, appearing on NBC's Saturday Night Live six times, the only professional juggler to perform on the show.

== Early life ==
Davis was born on August 23, 1953, to James Davis, an English teacher, and Donna Davis, a homemaker. He spent his early childhood in San Francisco, California. After moving to Susanville, they moved again a few years later to Danville, just outside San Francisco. Davis attended Monte Vista High School, graduating in 1971.

== Clown College ==
On October 1, 1973, Davis started a six-week course at the Ringling Bros. and Barnum & Bailey Clown College. Over 3,500 applicants were whittled down to a group of 38 men and 7 women ranging in age from 17 to 35. Upon completion, successful candidates were offered a contract with the circus. Davis was chosen to be a Ringling clown by virtue of his distinctive deadpan style. He travelled with the red unit for a year. The following year he signed on with the Gatti Charles Circus.

== TV to Ford's Theatre ==
In 1979 Davis performed on HBO's The Young Comedian's Show, his first major television appearance. On March 15, 1981, he performed in the opening (and also closing) night of the Broadway musical Broadway Follies. Although that musical was a flop, he was hired and immediately performed in the Broadway musical Sugar Babies, for which he was nominated for a Drama Desk Award and won a Theatre World Award for Best Featured Actor in a musical. He returned to San Francisco, established himself as a street performer, and performed at charity events, corporate events, schools, and night clubs.

On October 3, 1981, Davis made his debut performance on Saturday Night Live, introduced by the cast member Eddie Murphy. On May 7, 1983, he performed as Carlo Zambini in his sixth and final performance on Saturday Night Live. He was one of the "newscasters" on the NBC summer series The News Is the News, in which the members satirized actual news. It premiered on June 15, 1983; only four episodes aired because of poor ratings.

On September 25, 1982, and as part of a TV special called A Festival at Ford's, Davis headlined at Ford's Theatre along with E. G. Marshall, Grace Bumbry, David Copperfield, the Gatlin Brothers, Natalia Makarova, Liza Minnelli, Wayne Newton, Lou Rawls, and Ben Vereen. A pair of YouTube videos, which remain highly watched and referenced, show him entertaining President and Mrs. Ronald Reagan, who sat between House Speaker Tip O'Neill and Senate Majority Leader Howard Baker.

== Career, 1983–present ==
President Reagan visibly enjoyed Davis's performance at Ford's Theatre. On January 20, 1985, he performed at the inaugural ball following the second inauguration of Ronald Reagan. In the mid- to late 1980s, he appeared on the BBC's The Bob Monkhouse Show five times, at least three times on the Smothers Brothers Comedy Hour (30 Mar 1988, 27 Apr 1988, 11 Feb 1989), four times on the Tonight Show with Johnny Carson (23 February 1984, 24 May 1984, 3 Jan 1985, 22 July 1988), three times on Late Night with David Letterman (17 Feb 1983, 2 Nov 1983, 13 Mar 1986), and on Sesame Street. On The Tonight Show he famously quipped, "I started out with nothing. I still have most of it."

On March 29, 1986, he performed on the first American telecast of Comic Relief. The show, hosted by Robin Williams, Billy Crystal, and Whoopi Goldberg, raised funds for homeless people. On May 21, 1986, he appeared on NBC's Today, juggling for passengers aboard the SS Norway cruise ship. On November 24, 1986, he entertained Queen Elizabeth and the Queen Mother at the Royal Variety Performance, London Theatre Royal. On January 20, 1989, he returned to the White House to perform at the inaugural gala following President Bush's inauguration.

On July 10, 1990, Davis entertained President George Bush and other world leaders at the 16th G7 summit. On October 30, 1993, Davis performed again at Ford's Theatre for a TV special, "A Gala for the President at Ford's Theatre", but this time for President Clinton. Coperformers included Whoopi Goldberg, Jay Leno, Michael Bolton, Boyz II Men, Brett Butler, Natalie Cole, and Kenny Loggins. In December 1994, he performed in the Broadway performance Comedy Tonight, a vaudeville-type show with Mort Sahl, Dorothy Loudon, and Joy Behar, which lasted only eight shows. On November 5, 1997, he again entertained former President Bush and friends, this time at the opening of the presidential library.

In 2008 Davis was featured in the documentary Buskers; For Love or Money. During the early 2000s he was head writer and performed nightly for seven years at Teatro ZinZanni in San Francisco.
