= Bill Ballantine (illustrator) =

American writer and illustrator of circus subjects and professional clown

- Born: 1910; Millvale, Pennsylvania, US
- Died: May 14, 1999 (aged 88–89); Pine Nursing Home, Sarasota, Florida, US
- Education: Art Institute of Pittsburgh
- Occupations: writer, illustrator, circus clown
- Spouse: Roberta Ballantine

Bill Ballantine (1910–1999) was an American writer and illustrator of circus subjects, as well as a professional clown.

A prolific writer, Ballantine contributed circus and travel essays to major magazines. His many stories of circus life appeared in Collier's, Holiday, Harper’s Bazaar, Saturday Evening Post, True, Saga, and Seventeen. Ballantine also authored ten books, including Wild Tigers and Tame Fleas, Horses and Their Bosses, and Clown Alley, which chronicles his years as dean of the Ringling Bros. and Barnum & Bailey Clown College. Over his long career as a writer/illustrator, he published nearly 100 articles on circus and travel and regularly illustrated True magazine's backpage feature “Strange but True” with his graceful and warmly humorous pen-and-ink line drawings.

== Life ==
Born in 1910 in Millvale, Pennsylvania, Ballantine was introduced to circuses by his father, a member of the Mystic Shrine and once mayor of their home town. Mixing sawdust and grease paint with the sparkling tarnish of the music hall next door to his childhood home, Ballantine developed a lifelong hunger for show business.

After graduating from high school, Ballantine found work in a sign shop, painting posters for local movie houses, and after several years, began attending the Art Institute of Pittsburgh, beginning his long career as an artist/illustrator and later writer. Through the years, he worked for a succession of employers, including the Pittsburgh Sun-Telegraph, Associated Press, PM, Punch and during World War II, the Office of War Information for which he designed and drew pro-democracy leaflets that the U.S. government air-dropped over the European continent.

Ballantine also accepted freelance illustration and writing assignments that often provided him the opportunity to hitch rides with circus caravans. He traveled with Ringling Bros. and Barnum & Bailey Circus during the 1946 season and then, finally, in 1947, he decided to bid a temporary farewell to the workaday world of publishing and run away to the circus. He “joined out” as a clown with the biggest of all big tops, Ringling Bros. and Barnum Bailey Circus. He became a member of the Ringling clown alley with the august of the augustes—Felix Adler, Paul Jerome, Paul Jung, Emmett Kelly, and Harry Dann—as his working colleagues.

While working as a clown, he met his wife, Roberta Ballantine, a graduate of Pomona College who left California immediately after receiving her BA to go to NY where she worked as an actress and comedian before being hired by RBBB as the slender 6-foot-tall (1.8 m) “Snow Queen” who rode about the tent in the payoff float, a horse-drawn carriage with Prince Paul, the midget king. In her silver spangled skin-tight costume with her 3-foot-high (0.91 m) ostrich plume headdress, she looked “nine feet tall” to Bill who walked behind the float dressed as a sailor carrying a buxom mermaid: From the waist up, he was mermaid, his clown face framed by long blond curls and a golden crown topped by a single pink feather. A double strand of three-inch (76 mm) fake pearls hung down over pearl-studded breasts. Rings and bracelets slipped over his elbow length white cotton gloves, and in one hand, he carried a gold-filigree hand mirror. From the waist down he was sailor with white cotton duck pants reaching to red striped socks and oversized clown shoes. Strapped to his front was the false fish tail of the mermaid and strapped to his back the false upper half of the sailor. As a final touch, the false arms of the sailor’s torso draped around his own waist, and there he was, a sailor carrying a mermaid.

After Bill and Roberta married in 1948, they both left the life of sawdust and spangles, but Bill soon returned, first to design a complete new midway for the show, including sideshow banners and menagerie cage designs, and then as a chronicler of the backlot and the show.

In 1994, 64 of his large circus drawings were exhibited at the John and Mable Ringling Museum of Art Circus Gallery in Sarasota, Florida, where Bill and Roberta settled after raising a family of five children in Rockland County, New York.

=== Clown college ===
From 1969 through 1977, Ballantine served as dean of the Ringling Bros. and Barnum & Bailey Clown College, a school that offered the secrets of humor and comedy, and demanded much from its students, yet gave even more. A former student, NPR’s Murray Horwitz, noted in 1999 after Ballantine’s death, “I remember a time 30 years ago when American circus clowning had fallen on hard times and Bill Ballantine came to the rescue. Dozens of his students worked on the Ringling show, but hundreds more took their skills to the theatre, to mud shows and to the streets. Among them were Penn Jillette of Penn & Teller, The incredible Bill Irwin, and the actor, David Strathairn.”

== Death ==
Bill Ballantine died of Alzheimer's disease on May 14, 1999. His wife (now deceased), the writer Roberta Ballantine, fifteen grandchildren, and five children survived him. His eldest son, Toby followed in his father's footsteps and came to be recognized as a well-known clown and performer of magic. His eldest daughter, Bridget, once sparkled above the ring on a single trapeze. She is now retired.

Bill Ballantine will always be remembered by artists and circus folk alike as Murray Horwitz described him in 1999: a man who “proved that it was OK to put real ideas into your comedy” and “showed you that there were different kinds of intelligence and that acrobats and wire walkers could be just as witty in their way as poets.”

== Bibliography ==
- The Man in the Manhole and the Fix-it Men. (W. R. Scott, 1946), written by "Juniper Sage" (e.g. Margaret Wise Brown and Edith Thacher Hurd)
- Wild Tigers and Tame Fleas. NY: Rinehart, 1958.
- Horses and Their Bosses. NY: J.B. Lippincott, 1964.
- Nobody Loves a Cockroach. Boston: Little, Brown, 1968. Illustrations: Toby Ballantine
- High West. Chicago: Rand McNally, 1969.
- Clown Alley. Boston: Little Brown, 1989.
- The Piano: An Introduction to the Instrument. NY: F.Watts, 1971.
- The Violin: An Introduction to the Instrument. NY: F. Watts, 1971.
- The Flute: An Introduction to the Instrument. NY: F. Watts, 1971.
- Pipes & Strings. NY: Richardson & Steirman, 1986.
