= Ronnie Shakes =

American comedian

- Birth name: Ronald Michael Sakele
- Born: February 21, 1947; Brooklyn, New York, U.S.
- Died: May 16, 1987 (aged 40); Canton, Ohio, U.S.
- Medium: Stand-up

Ronnie Shakes (born Ronald Michael Sakele; February 21, 1947 – May 16, 1987) was an American stand up comedian who made seven appearances on the Tonight Show Starring Johnny Carson from 1984 to 1987. According to his wife, Ronnie "idolized [Woody] Allen, especially his perfect lines and timing".

Shakes died at age 40 of a heart attack while jogging.
