= List of Rowan & Martin's Laugh-In guests =

This is a list of the guests who appeared on the American sketch comedy television program Rowan & Martin's Laugh-In, which ran from January 22, 1968, to May 14, 1973. The program, hosted by Dan Rowan and Dick Martin with a regularly featured cast, made prominent use of celebrity guests during each episode. Some guests had a prominent role in an episode, while others appeared for a single gag. Some guests filmed a number of pieces at a time, which were then used in a number of different episodes.

== 1968 ==
- Herb Alpert & the Tijuana Brass
- Don Adams
- Nancy Ames
- Eve Arden
- Pamela Austin
- Barbara Bain
- Kaye Ballard
- The Banana Splits
- Billy Barty
- Elgin Baylor
- The Bee Gees
- Harry Belafonte
- Milton Berle
- Shelley Berman
- Joey Bishop
- John Byner
- Godfrey Cambridge
- Leo G. Carroll
- Cher
- Rosemary Clooney
- Tim Conway
- Joseph Cotten
- Robert Culp
- Tony Curtis
- Arlene Dahl
- Bill Dana
- Bobby Darin
- Jimmy Dean
- Phyllis Diller
- Hugh Downs
- Kirk Douglas
- Nanette Fabray
- Douglas Fairbanks Jr.
- Sally Field
- Barbara Feldon
- James Garner
- Greer Garson
- Mitzi Gaynor
- George Gobel
- Dick Gregory
- Lorne Greene
- Buddy Hackett
- Phil Harris
- Hugh Hefner
- The Holy Modal Rounders
- Bob Hope
- Lena Horne
- Rock Hudson
- George Jessel
- Van Johnson
- Anissa Jones
- George Kirby
- Werner Klemperer
- Martin Landau
- Muriel Landers
- Abbe Lane
- Jack Lemmon
- Sheldon Leonard
- Liberace
- Jerry Lewis
- Rich Little
- Guy Lombardo
- Marcel Marceau
- Ed McMahon
- Pat Morita
- Greg Morris
- Bob Newhart
- Leonard Nimoy
- The Nitty Gritty Dirt Band
- Richard Nixon
- France Nuyen
- Regis Philbin
- Edward Platt
- Otto Preminger
- Vincent Price
- Jack Riley
- Cliff Robertson
- Kenny Rogers & The First Edition
- Jill St. John
- Colonel Sanders
- Rod Serling
- Dinah Shore
- Walter Slezak
- Kate Smith
- Tom Smothers
- Sonny & Cher
- Connie Stevens
- Larry Storch
- The Strawberry Alarm Clock
- The Temptations
- Terry-Thomas
- Sonny Tufts
- Michael Wayne
- Patrick Wayne
- Paul Winchell

== 1969 ==
- Mel Brooks
- Sid Caesar
- Michael Caine
- Carol Channing
- Perry Como
- Tony Curtis
- Phyllis Diller
- James Drury
- Peter Falk
- Tennessee Ernie Ford
- James Garner
- Greer Garson
- Mitzi Gaynor
- George Gobel
- Frank Gorshin
- Billy Graham
- Lorne Greene
- Buddy Hackett
- Laurence Harvey
- Bob Hope
- Lena Horne
- Rock Hudson
- Engelbert Humperdinck
- Anne Jackson
- David Janssen
- George Jessel
- Van Johnson
- Davy Jones
- Tom Kennedy
- Werner Klemperer
- Jack E. Leonard
- Liberace
- Rich Little
- Gina Lollobrigida
- Guy Lombardo
- Marcel Marceau
- Doug McClure
- Ed McMahon
- Ann Miller
- The Monkees (without Peter Tork)
- Garry Moore
- Roger Moore
- Bob Newhart
- Richard Nixon
- Pat Nixon
- Debbie Reynolds
- Don Rickles
- Cliff Robertson
- Diana Ross
- Nipsey Russell
- Jill St. John
- Romy Schneider
- Peter Sellers
- Frank Sinatra Jr.
- Nancy Sinatra
- The Smothers Brothers
- Sonny & Cher
- Connie Stevens
- Jacqueline Susann
- Forrest Tucker
- Robert Wagner
- Wiere Brothers
- Eli Wallach
- Paul Winchell
- Shelley Winters
- Lana Wood

== 1970 ==
- Desi Arnaz
- Jim Backus
- Edgar Bergen
- Milton Berle
- Ken Berry
- William F. Buckley Jr.
- Michael Caine
- Art Carney
- Carol Channing
- Perry Como
- Tim Conway
- Wally Cox
- Bing Crosby
- Tony Curtis
- Tennessee Ernie Ford
- David Frost
- James Garner
- Greer Garson
- Andy Griffith
- Buddy Hackett
- Don Ho
- Engelbert Humperdinck
- Danny Kaye
- Sheldon Leonard
- George Lindsey
- Rich Little
- Ed McMahon
- Ricardo Montalbán
- Roger Moore
- Zero Mostel
- Vincent Price
- Carl Reiner
- Debbie Reynolds
- Don Rickles
- Jilly Rizzo
- Mickey Rooney
- Jill St. John
- Peter Sellers
- Rod Serling
- Dinah Shore
- Phil Silvers
- Nancy Sinatra
- Tom Smothers
- Ringo Starr
- Orson Welles
- Andy Williams
- Jonathan Winters

== 1971 ==
- Herschel Bernardi
- Joey Bishop
- Vida Blue
- James Brolin
- Truman Capote
- Jack Cassidy
- Wilt Chamberlain
- Chuck Connors
- Richard Crenna
- Bing Crosby
- Tony Curtis
- Roman Gabriel
- Frank Gorshin
- Andy Granatelli
- Lee Grant
- Andy Griffith
- Rita Hayworth
- Bob Hope
- Fernando Lamas
- Janet Leigh
- Marcello Mastroianni
- Liza Minnelli
- Martha Beall Mitchell
- Ricardo Montalbán
- Joe Namath
- Jilly Rizzo
- Edward G. Robinson
- Sugar Ray Robinson
- Bill Russell
- Jill St. John
- Doug Sanders
- Doc Severinsen
- Willie Shoemaker
- Dinah Shore
- Buffalo Bob Smith
- Vin Scully
- David Steinberg
- Karen Valentine
- Gore Vidal
- Raquel Welch
- Sam Yorty

== See also ==
- List of Rowan & Martin's Laugh-In episodes

== Sources ==
- Rowan & Martin's Laugh-In at IMDb
