= List of Rowan & Martin's Laugh-In episodes =

This is an episode list of American sketch comedy show Rowan & Martin's Laugh-In.

The show consisted of a series of rapid-fire gags and sketches, and occasionally featured numerous guest stars in one episode. Many popular entertainers of the 1960s and early 1970s appeared on Laugh-In portraying characters in comedy sketches or appearing as themselves.

== Series overview ==
Season	Episodes	Originally released	
Season	Episodes	First released	Last released
1	14	January 22, 1968	April 29, 1968
2	26	September 16, 1968	March 31, 1969
3	26	September 11, 1969	March 16, 1970
4	26	September 14, 1970	March 15, 1971
5	24	September 13, 1971	March 20, 1972
6	24	September 11, 1972	March 12, 1973
Special		March 18, 1971	

== Episodes ==
=== Pilot Special (1967) ===
Guest appearance(s)	Original air date
guest stars: Pamela Austin, Ken Berry, Judy Carne, Barbara Feldon, and featuring Ruth Buzzi, Henry Gibson, Larry Hovis, Arte Johnson, Monte Landis, Jo Anne Worley, Paul Weston and His Orchestra	September 9, 1967

=== Season 1 (1968) ===
No. in series	No. in season	Guest appearance(s), alphabetical order	Original air date
1	1	Pamela Austin, Leo G. Carroll, Barbara Feldon, Lorne Greene, Buddy Hackett, Sheldon Leonard, The Strawberry Alarm Clock, Tiny Tim, Flip Wilson	January 22, 1968
2	2	Leo G. Carroll, Robert Culp, The First Edition, Muriel Landers, Sheldon Leonard, Tom Smothers, Flip Wilson	January 29, 1968
3	3	Tim Conway, Cher, Paul Gilbert, Lorne Greene, Sheldon Leonard, Tiny Tim, Flip Wilson	February 5, 1968
4	4	Don Adams, Pamela Austin, Douglas Fairbanks Jr., Paul Gilbert, Nitty Gritty Dirt Band, Jack Riley, Walter Slezak, David Watson	February 12, 1968
5	5	Pamela Austin, Kaye Ballard, Richard Dawson, Douglas Fairbanks Jr., Peter Lawford, Dinah Shore, Walter Slezak	February 19, 1968
6	6	Nancy Ames, Charles E. Compton (Mayor of Burbank), Buddy Hackett, Jerry Lewis, Inga Neilsen (actress), Leonard Nimoy, Edward Platt, Dinah Shore, Connie Stevens, Larry Storch, The Temptations	February 26, 1968
7	7	Joby Baker, Godfrey Cambridge, Sally Field, Jerry Lewis, Inga Neilsen, Terry-Thomas, John Wayne	March 4, 1968
8	8	Cher, Barbara Feldon, Anissa Jones, Jerry Lewis, Pat Morita, Dinah Shore, Sonny (w/o Cher), John Wayne, Paul Winchell	March 11, 1968
9	9	Pamela Austin, Elgin Baylor, Chris Bearde, Harry Belafonte, Joey Bishop, Sammy Davis Jr., Regis Philbin, John Wayne	March 25, 1968
10	10	Sivi Aberg, The Bee Gees, Harry Belafonte, Johnny Carson, Sammy Davis Jr., Barbara Feldon, Ed McMahon, Flip Wilson	April 1, 1968
11	11	Pamela Austin, John Byner, Hugh Downs, James Garner, David Lipp, Flip Wilson, Paul Winchell,	April 8, 1968
12	12	Kaye Ballard, Harry Belafonte, Shelley Berman, John Byner, The Curtain Callers, James Garner, John Wayne, Flip Wilson	April 15, 1968
13	13	Shelley Berman, John Byner, Johnny Carson, Tim Conway, Hugh Downs, Barbara Feldon, John Wayne, Flip Wilson, Paul Winchell	April 22, 1968
14	14	Sivi Aberg, Pamela Austin, Milton Berle, Shelley Berman, Joey Bishop, John Byner, Jill St. John, Tiny Tim, John Wayne, Flip Wilson,	April 29, 1968

=== Season 2 (1968–69) ===
No. in series	No. in season	Guest appearance(s), alphabetical order	Original air date
15	1	Barbara Feldon, Zsa Zsa Gabor, Hugh Hefner, Bob Hope, Jack Lemmon, Richard Nixon, Sonny Tufts, John Wayne, John B. Whitney (Mayor, Burbank)	September 16, 1968
16	2	Herb Alpert, Eve Arden, Nick Castle, Arlene Dahl, Zsa Zsa Gabor, George Kirby, Jack Lemmon, Sonny Tufts, John Wayne, Patrick Wayne, Wild Man Fischer	September 23, 1968
17	3	Zsa Zsa Gabor, Greer Garson, Bob Hope, Abbe Lane, Greg Morris, Otto Preminger, Michael Wayne	September 30, 1968
18	4	Robert Culp, Arlene Dahl, Kirk Douglas, Lena Horne, Liberace, France Nuyen, Otto Preminger, Catherine Reid, Sonny Tufts, Flip Wilson	October 7, 1968
19	5	Rosemary Clooney, Bobby Darin*, Kirk Douglas, Mitzi Gaynor, The Holy Modal Rounders (w/Sam Shepard on drums), Harland Sanders, Sonny Tufts	October 14, 1968
20	6	Sammy Davis Jr., Greer Garson, Van Johnson, Werner Klemperer, Liberace, Flip Wilson	October 21, 1968
21	7	Bill Dana, Jimmy Dean, Zsa Zsa Gabor, Lena Horne, Marcel Marceau, Jack Riley, Sonny Tufts, Flip Wilson	October 28, 1968
22	8	George Gobel, Dick Gregory*, Howard Hart, Rock Hudson, Rod Serling, Dick Whittington	November 11, 1968
23	9	The Banana Splits, Victor Borge, Rosemary Clooney, Arlene Dahl, George Gobel, Phil Harris, George Kirby, Jack Riley, The Legendary Stardust Cowboy (w/ T-Bone Burnett on drums), Fred Williamson	November 18, 1968
24	10	Perry Como, Joseph Cotten, Arlene Dahl, Phyllis Diller, Zsa Zsa Gabor, Otto Preminger, Vincent Price, Tiny Tim, Henny Youngman	November 25, 1968
25	11	Joseph Cotten, Tony Curtis, Peter Lawford, Liberace, Cliff Robertson, Henny Youngman	December 2, 1968
26	12	Barbara Bain, Billy Barty (as Santa), Jack Benny, Douglas Fairbanks Jr., Rock Hudson, Martin Landau, Guy Lombardo, Otto Preminger, Jack Riley, Dick Whittington	December 16, 1968
27	13	Bill Dana, Brothers Legard (The LeGarde Twins), Nanette Fabray, Sally Field with Don Rickles (on film), Lena Horne, Byron Gilliam (jogger), George Jessel, Rich Little, Bob Newhart, Vincent Price, Jack Riley, Kate Smith, Dick Whittington	December 30, 1968
28	14	Jack Benny, Brothers LeGarde (The LeGarde Twins), Peter Falk, Marcel Marceau, Pigmeat Markham, Garry Moore, Flip Wilson, Dick Whittington Henry Youngman	January 6, 1969
29	15	J. J. Barry, Johnny Carson, Perry Como, David Janssen, Van Johnson, Peter Lawford, Paul Winchell	January 13, 1969
30	16	J. J. Barry, Brothers LeGarde (The LeGarde Twins), George Gobel, Guy Lombardo, Richard Nixon (on film),Jack Riley, Frank Sinatra, Jr. (on film), Nancy Sinatra*, The Smothers Brothers	January 20, 1969
31	17	Jack Benny, Tony Curtis, Zsa Zsa Gabor, Byron Gilliam, Frank Gorshin, George Jessel, Samantha Lloyd, Janos Prohaska (in gorilla costume), Shelley Winters	January 27, 1969
32	18	George Jessel, Tom Kennedy, Liberace, Rich Little, Don Rickles*, John Roach, Cliff Robertson, Carol Worthington (actress)	February 3, 1969
33	19	J. J. Barry, Greer Garson, Davy Jones*, Byron Gilliam, Nipsey Russell, Robert Wagner, Al "Red Dog" Weber	February 10, 1969
34	20	Jack Benny, James Drury, James Garner*, Muriel Landers, Guy Lombardo, Gina Lollobrigida, Doug McClure, Tiny Tim, Uncle Heavy (Boyd Kimes) & His Porkchop Review (with 'Oink')	February 17, 1969
35	21	Mel Brooks, Peter Falk, Lena Horne, Rock Hudson, Peter Lawford, Bob Newhart, Connie Stevens*, Tiny Tim	February 24, 1969
36	22	Tony Curtis, James Garner, Ann Miller, The Smothers Brothers, Forrest Tucker, Robert Wagner, The Wiere Brothers, Shelley Winters	March 3, 1969
37	23	James Drury, Werner Klemperer, Gina Lollobrigida, Doug McClure, Flip Wilson	March 10, 1969
38	24	Sammy Davis Jr.*, Byron Gilliam, Werner Klemperer, Ann Miller, Garry Moore, Flip Wilson	March 17, 1969
39	25	Perry Como, Tony Curtis, Stu Gilliam, Laurence Harvey, Flip Wilson	March 24, 1969
40	26	George Gobel, Billy Graham, Werner Klemperer, Tiny Tim, Arthur Walsh (actor), The Wiere Brothers (Lyndon Johnson, Richard Nixon, Laugh-In writer/ producer Paul Keyes - on news-film)	June 9, 1969

(* indicates primary guest)

=== Season 3 (1969–1970) ===
No. in series	No. in season	Guest appearance(s), alphabetical order	Original air date
41	1	Johnny Carson, Debbie Reynolds*, Peter Sellers, Flip Wilson	September 15, 1969
42	2	Michael Caine, "Cyrus Quigly" (Marc London, show writer)*, Bob Hope, Diana Ross*	September 22, 1969
43	3	Sonny & Cher*, Flip Wilson	September 29, 1969
44	4	Micky Dolenz, Davy Jones, Mike Nesmith (The Monkees*)	October 6, 1969
45	5	Mitzi Gaynor, Jack E. Leonard*, Lana Wood	October 13, 1969
46	6	Sivi Aberg (Miss Sweden 1964), Romy Schneider, Anne Jackson* and Eli Wallach* (husband & wife)	October 20, 1969
47	7	Jack Riley, Flip Wilson*	October 27, 1969
48	8	Sammy Davis Jr., Buddy Hackett*, Sandy Hackett	November 3, 1969
49	9	Johnny Carson, Carol Channing*	November 10, 1969
50	10	Sid Caesar*, Zsa Zsa Gabor, Diana Ross, Peter Sellers	November 17, 1969
51	11	Michael Caine, Sammy Davis Jr.*, Tennessee Ernie Ford, Debbie Reynolds, Davy Jones	November 24, 1969
52	12	Jack Benny, Johnny Carson, Zsa Zsa Gabor, Engelbert Humperdinck, Jill St. John, Peter Lawford	December 1, 1969
53	13	Phyllis Diller, Roger Moore, Romy Schneider, Jacqueline Susann	December 8, 1969
54	14	Greer Garson, Stu Gilliam, Lorne Greene	December 15, 1969
55	15	David Frye, George Gobel, Guy Lombardo, Ed McMahon, Frank Sinatra Jr., Nancy Sinatra*	December 29, 1969
56	16	James Garner*, Engelbert Humperdinck, Roger Moore	January 5, 1970
57	17	Jonathan Winters*, Peter Wintonick	January 12, 1970
58	18	Bing Crosby, Sammy Davis Jr., David Frye, Peter Lawford, Ed McMahon	January 19, 1970
59	19	Jack Benny, Tony Curtis, Tennessee Ernie Ford, Jill St. John	January 26, 1970
60	20	Jack Benny, Michael Caine, Johnny Carson, George Lindsey	February 2, 1970
61	21	Jim Backus, Greer Garson, Agatha Grunt, Art Metrano, Andy Williams, Andy Griffith, Carl Reiner*	February 9, 1970
62	22	Dan Blocker, Johnny Brown, Perry Como, Tom Smothers, Flip Wilson	February 16, 1970
63	23	Carol Channing, Wally Cox, Sheldon Leonard, Art Metrano, Ringo Starr	February 23, 1970
64	24	Zsa Zsa Gabor, Danny Kaye	March 2, 1970
65	25	Billy Barnes, Edgar Bergen, Milton Berle, Jimmy Caesar, Agatha Grunt, Buddy Hackett, Mickey Rooney, Nancy Sinatra, Jill St. John, Andy Williams	March 9, 1970
66	26	Carol Channing, Tony Curtis, Peter Sellers, Tiny Tim	March 16, 1970

(* indicates primary guest)

=== Season 4 (1970–71) ===
No. in series	No. in season	Guest appearance(s), alphabetical order	Original air date
67	1	Art Carney, Jilly Rizzo	September 14, 1970
68	2	David Frost, Don Rickles, Jilly Rizzo	September 21, 1970
69	3	Carol Channing, Tim Conway, Goldie Hawn, Jilly Rizzo	September 28, 1970
70	4	Ken Berry, Tim Conway, Jilly Rizzo	October 5, 1970
71	5	Tim Conway, Jilly Rizzo	October 12, 1970
72	6	David Frost, Don Ho, Zero Mostel	October 19, 1970
73	7	Vincent Price, Rod Serling, Orson Welles	October 26, 1970
74	8	Carol Channing, Carl Reiner, Jilly Rizzo	November 2, 1970
75	9	Jim Backus, Greer Garson, Andy Griffith, Carl Reiner, Jilly Rizzo	November 9, 1970
76	10	Desi Arnaz, Bob Newhart	November 16, 1970
77	11	Desi Arnaz, Phyllis Diller, David Frost, Jilly Rizzo, Rod Serling	November 23, 1970
78	12	Bill Cosby, Peter Lawford, Ricardo Montalbán, Vincent Price, Dinah Shore, Gore Vidal, Flip Wilson	November 30, 1970
79	13	Don Ho, Jilly Rizzo, Rod Serling, Phil Silvers	December 7, 1970
80	14	Bing Crosby, Phyllis Diller, Rich Little, Debbie Reynolds, Jilly Rizzo, Bill Cosby, William F. Buckley Jr., Jack Cassidy	December 14, 1970
81	15	William F. Buckley Jr., Johnny Carson, Carol Channing, Phyllis Diller, Rich Little, Zero Mostel	December 28, 1970
82	16	Wilt Chamberlain, Sammy Davis Jr.	January 4, 1971
83	17	Johnny Carson, Phyllis Diller, Peter Lawford, Ricardo Montalbán, Dinah Shore, Gore Vidal, Sam Yorty	January 11, 1971
84	18	Joey Bishop, Ralph Edwards, Jilly Rizzo, David Steinberg	January 18, 1971
85	19	Jack Cassidy, Wilt Chamberlain, Teresa Graves, Andy Griffith	January 25, 1971
86	20	Bill Cosby, Teresa Graves, Claudine Longet, Marcello Mastroianni, Louis Nye, Jilly Rizzo	February 1, 1971
87	21	Herschel Bernardi, Truman Capote, Peter Lawford, Dinah Shore	February 8, 1971
88	22	Truman Capote, Wilt Chamberlain, Chuck Connors, Peter Lawford, Ricardo Montalbán, Sam Yorty	February 15, 1971
89	23	Bing Crosby, Sammy Davis Jr., Peter Lawford, Roger Miller, George Raft, Jilly Rizzo, David Steinberg	February 22, 1971
90	24	Richard Crenna, Fernando Lamas, Marcello Mastroianni, Deborah Shelton	March 1, 1971
91	25	Jack Benny, Johnny Carson, Bill Cosby, Sammy Davis Jr., Rich Little, Roger Miller, Claudine Longet, Rod Serling, Jilly Rizzo, Gore Vidal	March 8, 1971
92	26	Herschel Bernardi, Chuck Connors, Tim Conway, Phyllis Diller, Fernando Lamas, Louis Nye, George Raft	March 15, 1971

=== Special (1971) Artie Johnson: Very Interesting (hosted by Johnson) ===
Guest appearance(s), alphabetical order	Original air date
Bing Crosby, Arte Johnson, Nancy Kulp, Misty Rowe, and Elke Sommer	March 18, 1971

=== Season 5 (1971–72) ===
No. in series	No. in season	Guest appearance(s), alphabetical order	Original air date
93	1	Johnny Carson, Moosie Drier, Buffalo Bob Smith, Raquel Welch, Kent McCord, Martin Milner, Martha Mitchell, Pat Morita, Henny Youngman	September 13, 1971
94	2	Vida Blue, Johnny Carson, Roman Gabriel, Andy Granatelli, Joe Namath, Sugar Ray Robinson, Bill Russell, Doug Sanders, Vin Scully, Jill St. John, Willie Shoemaker	September 20, 1971
95	3	James Brolin, Johnny Carson, Rita Hayworth, Doc Severinsen, Jill St. John, Henny Youngman	September 27, 1971
96	4	Johnny Carson, Kent McCord, Martin Milner, Harold Sakata, Buffalo Bob Smith, Jacqueline Susann, Karen Valentine	October 4, 1971
97	5	Johnny Carson, Tony Curtis, Chad Everett, Frank Gorshin, Rita Hayworth, Dean Jones, Edward G. Robinson, Buffalo Bob Smith	October 11, 1971
98	6	Richard Crenna, Janet Leigh	October 18, 1971
99	7	Lee Grant, Ted Mack, Harold Sakata, Jill St. John, Willie Shoemaker, Louisa Moritz	October 25, 1971
100	8	Judy Carne, Henry Gibson, Teresa Graves, Arte Johnson, Tiny Tim, John Wayne, Jo Anne Worley	November 1, 1971
101	9	Ralph Edwards, Jill St. John, Liza Minnelli, Edward G. Robinson, Louisa Moritz	November 8, 1971
102	10	James Coco, Tony Curtis	November 22, 1971
103	11	Perry Como, Sheldon Leonard, Mike Mazurki, Kent McCord, Martin Milner, Agnes Moorehead, Vincent Price, Jack Soo, Three Dog Night	November 29, 1971
104	12	Bing Crosby, Janet Leigh, Carroll O'Connor	December 13, 1971
105	13	Charo, Petula Clark, Burt Mustin, Joe Namath, Queenie Smith	December 20, 1971
106	14	Fannie Flagg, Buddy Hackett, Jack LaLanne, Sally Struthers, Mona Tera, Forrest Tucker	December 27, 1971
107	15	Robert Goulet, Tiny Tim, Mona Tera	January 3, 1972
108	16	James Coco, Fannie Flagg, Charles Nelson Reilly, Mort Sahl, Henny Youngman, Mona Tera	January 10, 1972
109	17	Sue Ane Langdon, Carl Reiner, Slappy White, Mona Tera, Sally Struthers	January 24, 1972
110	18	Jack Carter, Chad Everett, Paul Lynde, John Wayne, Mona Tera	January 31, 1972
111	19	Charlie Callas, Dick Cavett, Carol Channing, Richard Crenna, Slappy White, Mona Tera	February 14, 1972
112	20	Robert Goulet, Gene Hackman, Sue Ane Langdon, Paul Lynde, Terry-Thomas	February 21, 1972
113	21	Steve Allen, Carol Channing, Gene Hackman, Jo Ann Pflug, Charles Nelson Reilly, Terry-Thomas, John Wayne	February 28, 1972
114	22	Charlie Callas, Jack Carter, Johnny Cash, Dick Cavett, Burt Mustin, Debbie Reynolds, Queenie Smith	March 6, 1972
115	23	Sandy Duncan, Jo Ann Pflug, Joe Namath, Charles Nelson Reilly, Jean Stapleton	March 13, 1972
116	24	Sandy Duncan, Joe Namath, Jo Ann Pflug, Charles Nelson Reilly, Jean Stapleton	March 20, 1972

=== Season 6 (1972–73) ===
No. in series	No. in season	Guest appearance(s), alphabetical order	Original air date
117	1	Army Archerd, Isaac Hayes, Duke Hazlett (entertainer & Sinatra impersonator), Kent McCord, Martin Milner, Mary Rowan, Jill St. John, John Wayne	September 11, 1972
118	2	Sebastian Cabot, Dyan Cannon, Sammy Davis Jr., Bob Hope, Abbe Lane, Janet Leigh, Julie London	September 18, 1972
119	3	William Conrad, Bob Crane, Nanette Fabray, Della Reese, Henry Mancini, Alexis Smith	September 25, 1972
120	4	Lucie Arnaz, Marvene Jones, Rich Little, Alan Peterson, Ross Martin, Mary Rowan	October 2, 1972
121	5	Steve Allen, Mama Cass Elliot, Hank Grant, Tom Harmon, Michael Landon, Della Reese, Mary Rowan, Lyle Waggoner, Frank Welker, Henny Youngman	October 9, 1972
122	6	Bill Bixby, Jack Carter, Dorothy Manners, Jean Stapleton, Henny Youngman	October 16, 1972
123	7	Jack Benny, Sue Cameron, James Farentino, Michele Lee, Peter Marshall, Hugh O'Brian, Charles Nelson Reilly, Henny Youngman	October 23, 1972
124	8	Mike Connors, Totie Fields, Charles Nelson Reilly	October 30, 1972
125	9	Jack Benny, Sue Ane Langdon, Sally Struthers	November 13, 1972
126	10	James Caan, Bob Crane, Shirley Eder, Nanette Fabray, Della Reese, Mary Rowan, Abby Sweir	November 20, 1972
127	11	Carol Burnett, Paul Gilbert, Ross Martin, Vernon Scott (journalist), Demond Wilson	November 27, 1972
128	12	Jack Klugman, Rich Little, Henny Youngman	December 4, 1972
129	13	Steve Allen, Steve Lawrence, Peter Marshall	December 11, 1972
130	14	Howard Cosell, Alex Karras, Dan Luckow, Kent McCord, Martin Milner, Vin Scully, Mark Spitz	December 18, 1972
131	15	Charlie Callas, Duke Hazlett, Kent McCord, Martin Milner, Charles Nelson Reilly, Don Rickles	January 8, 1973
132	16	Charles Fleischer, Robert Goulet, Bob Thomas	January 15, 1973
133	17	Sammy Davis Jr.	January 22, 1973
134	18	Angie Dickinson, Totie Fields, Monty Hall, Frank Welker	January 29, 1973
135	19	Phyllis Diller, Paul Gilbert, Michael Greer, Morton Moss (journalist/actor), Oral Roberts, Unknown/uncredited male comedic performer	February 5, 1973
136	20	Ernest Borgnine, Arthur Godfrey, Sheilah Graham, Don Rickles, Mary Rowan, John Wayne, Slappy White	February 12, 1973
137	21	Rona Barrett, David Birney, Meredith Baxter-Birney, Rip Taylor, Slappy White, Jo Anne Worley	February 19, 1973
138	22	Marilyn Beck, Charlie Callas, Johnny Carson, Sandy Duncan, Arthur Godfrey	February 26, 1973
139	23	Dom DeLuise	March 5, 1973
140	24	Ernest Borgnine, Sammy Davis Jr., Robert Goulet, Rip Taylor, Jo Anne Worley	March 12, 1973
