= Val Anthony =

American singer and musician

Val Anthony is an American singer and musician. He was a pianist and cabaret singer at Jilly's, a popular New York City night club in the 1960s owned by Jilly Rizzo. Frequent guests included Frank Sinatra and his Rat Pack, Dean Martin and Sammy Davis Jr. Others, like Liza Minnelli and Marilyn Monroe, also frequented the club.

Sinatra described Anthony as "the finest working saloon singer in New York." He released several records on the Columbia label in the 1950s, including the double A-side "The Heart of a Fool/The Portuguese Fishermen." Anthony was a favourite of Sinatra's, who once said " This guy sounds more like me than me."

According to a 2006 article, Val Anthony still plays in the New York clubs. He is good friends with Greg Bravo/ Gary Scott (former frontman for the short-lived rock band Steam, who hit big in 1970 with "Na Na Hey Hey Kiss Him Goodbye") and the two jam together occasionally.
