= Dennis Allen (comedian) =

American comedian (1940–1995)

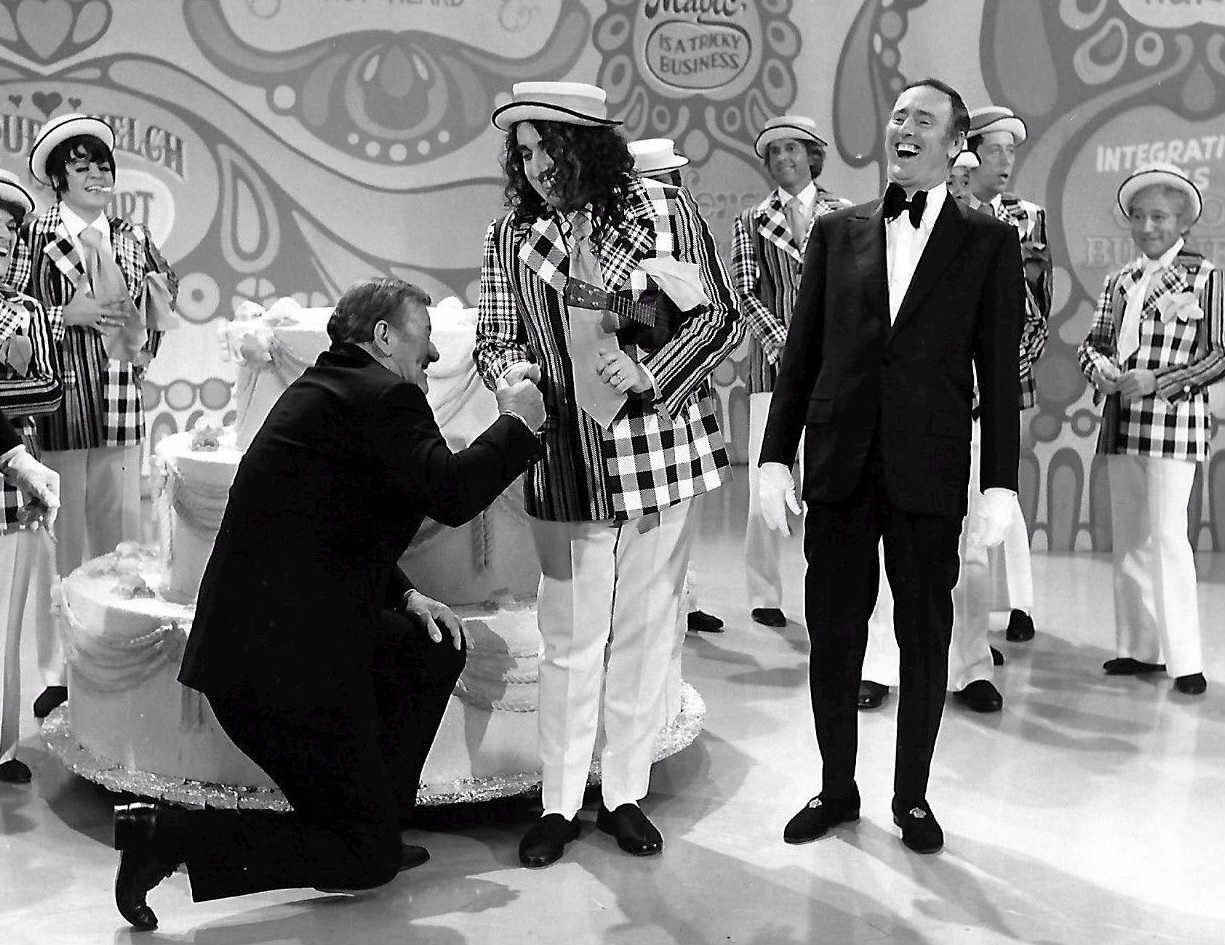
Rowan & Martin's Laugh-In, front L-R: John Wayne, Tiny Tim, Dick Martin. In background, L-R: Ruth Buzzi, Joanne Worley, Alan Sues, Dennis Allen, and Henry Gibson

Dennis Roy Allen (June 10, 1940 – December 1, 1995) was an actor and comedian. He was a regular cast member on Rowan and Martin's Laugh-In, and appeared on Love American Style. He starred opposite Ruth Buzzi in Gene Kelly's Broadway production of ClownAround. He died in 1995 of lung cancer, aged 55.

== Life and career ==
Born and raised in Raytown, Missouri, Allen earned a Bachelor and master's degrees from the Boston University College of Fine Arts. After completing his education, he moved to New York and began his career performing in an Off-Broadway music revue of material by Julius Monk in the Plaza 9 club at the Plaza Hotel. He spent next four years performing sketch comedy in New York clubs, and working as an actor in radio and television commercials.

In 1968, Allen was cast as Calvin Coolidge in William F. Brown and composer-lyricist Oscar Brand's musical How To Steal An Election. Earning rave reviews for his performance; he drew the attention of the producers of Rowan and Martin's Laugh-In and was invited to join the cast. From 1970 through 1973, he was a main cast member of Laugh-In; there he was reunited with former ClownAround co-star Ruth Buzzi.

The tall, lanky Dennis Allen was the most physical of the Laugh-In troupe, often doing spectacularly awkward falls and being on the receiving end of physical punishment (hit with opening doors, assaulted by other cast members, etc.). The series writers took full advantage of Allen's athletic abilities, and often cast him in blackouts as a hapless victim of circumstance who always gets knocked around. The writers also created a recurring character for Allen: Eric Clarified (a sendup of news analyst Eric Sevareid), who would attempt to address a newsworthy topic and get hopelessly confused while explaining it.

Allen also created his own recurring character, "Chaplain Bud Homily", a mild-mannered parson who reflected on the spiritual things in life, only to be soaked with water, pelted with debris, or sent through trap doors in the floor. When Rowan and Martin took charge of the Laugh-In series in 1972, they dismissed most of the cast members in favor of new faces, but retained those they considered most valuable: Dennis Allen, Ruth Buzzi, Richard Dawson, and Gary Owens; Lily Tomlin was kept on for limited appearances.

After the show ended, Allen worked in a few television commercials and then returned to Missouri. He resided in Kansas City. During this time he struggled with substance abuse. After receiving treatment, he recovered and worked for a time with a program that assisted boys who were emotionally disturbed.

Allen resumed his career as an actor in regional theatre in and around Kansas City, often portraying comedy roles.

He died in Kansas City, Missouri of lung cancer at the age of 55.
