= Evil Roy Slade =

1972 comedy television film directed by Jerry Paris

- VHS cover for Evil Roy Slade
- Genre: Comedy; Western
- Written by: Jerry Belson; Garry Marshall
- Directed by: Jerry Paris
- Starring: John Astin; Pamela Austin; Mickey Rooney; Dick Shawn; Henry Gibson; Milton Berle; Edie Adams; Dom Deluise
- Theme music composer: Murray MacLeod; Stuart Margolin; Jerry Riopelle; James Prigmore
- Country of origin: United States
- Original language: English

Production
- Executive producer: Howie Horwitz
- Producers: Jerry Belson; Garry Marshall
- Production locations: Universal Studios, 100 Universal City Plaza, Universal City, California
- Cinematography: Sam Leavitt
- Editor: Richard M. Sprague
- Running time: 97 minutes (approx.)
- Production company: Universal Television

Original release
- Network: NBC
- Release: February 18, 1972

Evil Roy Slade is a 1972 American made-for-television Western comedy film about the "meanest villain in the West". It was directed by Jerry Paris and co-produced and co-written by Garry Marshall. The film is considered a cult classic.

== Plot ==
Orphaned and left in the desert as an infant, Evil Roy Slade (John Astin) grew up raised by buzzards—save for his teddy bear—and mean. As an adult, he is notorious for being the "meanest villain in the West", so he is thrown for quite a loop when he falls for sweet schoolmarm Betsy Potter (Pamela Austin). Nelson L. Stool (Mickey Rooney), a railroad tycoon, along with his dimwitted nephew Clifford (Henry Gibson), attempts to get revenge on Evil Roy Slade for repeatedly robbing him, and sets out to hire legendary retired singing-sheriff Marshal Bing Bell (Dick Shawn) to bring Slade to justice.

== Cast ==
- John Astin as Evil Roy Slade
- Mickey Rooney as Nelson L. Stool
- Dick Shawn as Marshal Bing Bell
- Henry Gibson as Clifford Stool
- Dom DeLuise as Dr. Logan Delp
- Edie Adams as Flossie
- Pamela Austin as Betsy Potter
- Milton Berle as Harry Fern
- Arthur Batanides as Lee
- Larry Hankin as Snake
- Robert Liberman as Preacher
- Edmund Cambridge as Smith
- Connie Sawyer as Aggie Potter
- Alice Nunn as Claire Beckendorf
- Pat Morita as Turhan
- Luana Anders as Alice Fern
- Billy Sands as Randolph Sweet
- Milton Frome as Foss
- Pat Buttram as Narrator (voice only; uncredited)
- Penny Marshall as Bank Teller (uncredited)
- Billy Curtis as Toy Cowboy (uncredited)
- Ed Begley, Jr. (uncredited)
