= The Perils of Pauline (1967 film) =

1967 film

- Film poster
- Directed by: Herbert B. Leonard; Joshua Shelley
- Written by: Albert Beich
- Based on: The Perils of Pauline; 1914 serial by Charles W. Goddard
- Produced by: Herbert B. Leonard
- Starring: Pat Boone; Pamela Austin
- Cinematography: Jack A. Marta
- Edited by: Sam E. Waxman
- Music by: Vic Mizzy
- Distributed by: Universal Pictures
- Release date: August 2, 1967
- Running time: 107 minutes
- Country: United States
- Language: English

The Perils of Pauline is a 1967 American comedy film based on the movie serial of the same name.

Inspired by the Batman TV series, with the same kind of florid villainy and dauntless heroics, this TV pilot starred Pamela Austin, best known for her appearances in Dodge commercials at the time (urging viewers to "Join the Dodge Rebellion!"), as Pauline, with Pat Boone as her staunch protector.

The pilot did not find a sponsor or a network, and the three sample shows were compiled into a theatrical feature film and released by Universal Pictures. Extra footage for this was shot in December 1966.

Universal's home-movie company, Castle Films, turned it back into a serial, excerpting four episodes from the feature. The movie enjoyed neither the commercial nor critical success of the earlier versions of The Perils of Pauline.

== Plot ==
An orphaned boy named George finds baby Pauline in a basket on the ground. George takes her back to the orphanage and promises to protect her no matter what. When George's over-protectiveness puts Pauline in danger, Mrs. Carruthers, the owner of the orphanage, kicks him out. George tells Pauline that when he makes his fortune, he will come back for her. Pauline promises to wait.

The bulk of the film consists of Pauline getting into and escaping from increasingly ridiculous slapstick situations, with George always arriving slightly too late.

Pauline finds work as a teacher for a young African prince, Benji, who thinks Pauline is his fiancé. Pauline escapes him and hides, but is sold to a tribe of pygmies in the Congo, who attempt to make her drink a potion to shrink her down to pygmy size. Benji sends his servant Sten to bring back Pauline. Sten falls in love with Pauline and the two have adventures on the river in Africa.

Pauline is in the New York Mercy hospital with Sten, intending to marry him. Pauline finds out George contracted a disease while in Africa, attempting to save her. She decides to nurse George back to health, and goes to the store to buy hospital clothes. As she is walking down the street, she falls into a manhole.

Pauline ends up on the estate of Casper Coleman, who decides to have her married to his grandson. As his grandson is only a baby, he plans to freeze Pauline, until he gets older. Sten and George both make bumbling attempts to rescue her.

Sten colludes with the Russians to have himself launched into orbit with Pauline. Two FBI agents give Pauline a micro-camera to take pictures while on the spacecraft. At an arms parade following the success of the space launch, Pauline meets a U.S. double agent and gives him the photographs. Thinking he has lost Pauline forever, George has himself brainwashed in an attempt to forget her. Pauline suggests that George go to a sanitarium in Switzerland to jog his memory, while she goes to Venice to be in Frandisi's movie and makes George's fortune back.

At the sanitarium, George's memory comes back and he goes to Venice to see Pauline. On set, he rescues her from an escaped gorilla. The film ends as George and Pauline finally get married, and share a kiss on their gondola as it sinks.

== Cast ==
- Pat Boone as George Stedman
- Pamela Austin as Pauline
- Terry-Thomas as Sten Martin
- Edward Everett Horton as Casper Coleman
- Hamilton Camp as Thorpe
- Doris Packer as Mrs. Carruthers
- Kurt Kasznar as the consul general
- Vito Scotti as Frandisi
- Leon Askin as the commissar
- Rick Natoli as Prince Benji

== Production ==
At the time of filming, Pamela Austin was best known for her work on TV commercials. Filming began late November 1966. The original director was Ken Annakin who was fired during filming.

== Reception ==
Diabolique magazine later wrote that "there's a surprisingly strong emotional undercurrent to the story. Austin and Boone are soulmates, and just want to get married, but others stop them... It's a repetitive storyline, though. Boone and Austin are about to get together, but something stops them. And it has the cheerful racism of films of this era (horny Arabs, midgets in Africa). It is full of energy and never lets up. The movies it most reminded me of were the ’60s AIP beach party comedies... Little kids will like it especially girls who might identify with Pauline."
