= Henry Gibson =

American actor (1935–2009)

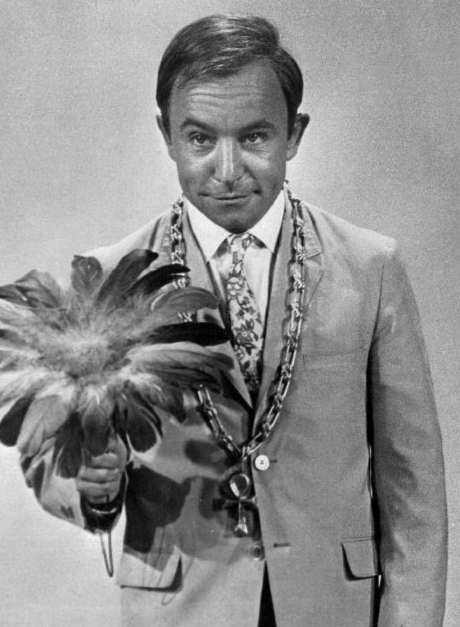
- Gibson as The Poet on Rowan & Martin's Laugh-In (1969)
- Born: James Bateman; September 21, 1935; Philadelphia, Pennsylvania, U.S.
- Died: September 14, 2009 (aged 73); Malibu, California, U.S.
- Other name: Olsen Gibson
- Education: Catholic University of America
- Occupations: Actor; comedian; poet
- Years active: 1943–2009
- Spouse: Lois Joan Geiger (m. 1966; died 2007)
- Children: 3, including Charles Alexander Gibson

James Bateman (September 21, 1935 – September 14, 2009), known professionally as Henry Gibson, was an American actor, comedian and poet. He played roles in the television sketch-comedy series Rowan & Martin's Laugh-In from 1968 to 1971, was the voice of the protagonist Wilbur in the animated feature Charlotte's Web (1973), portrayed country star Haven Hamilton in Robert Altman's film Nashville (1975), the Illinois Nazi leader in The Blues Brothers (1980), and appeared in The 'Burbs (1989). His later film roles included starring in The Luck of the Irish (2001) and smaller parts as Thurston Howell in Magnolia (1999) and as Father O'Neil in Wedding Crashers (2005). His final major acting role was as Judge Clark Brown on the television show Boston Legal, from 2004 to 2008.

== Early life ==
Gibson was born September 21, 1935, in Germantown, Philadelphia, Pennsylvania. After graduating from the Catholic University of America in Washington, D.C., he served as an intelligence officer in the United States Air Force with the 66th Tactical Reconnaissance Wing in France from 1957 to 1960. Early in his career as a professional entertainer, he developed a comedy act in which he played a poet from Fairhope, Alabama. He adopted the stage name Henry Gibson, which is a homophone for the name of famed Norwegian dramatist Henrik Ibsen. He also is known to have used the name Olsen Gibson.

== Career ==
Gibson began his acting career at 8 years old, working as a touring performer for the Mae Desmond Theatre for nine years. He appeared in many stage and theater productions. Gibson made many appearances on Tonight Starring Jack Paar between 1957 and 1962, often reciting his poetry. In 1962, his appearance coincided with guest-host Jerry Lewis. Lewis, charmed by Gibson's demeanor, cast him in The Nutty Professor (1963). Gibson's career took off following this film appearance. That was followed in 1964 by his poetry-reciting cowboy character Quirt Manly on the popular show The Beverly Hillbillies. Around this time, Gibson appeared in an episode of My Favorite Martian.

Gibson spent three years as part of the Laugh-In television show's cast, where he was nominated for a Golden Globe in 1971. He often played "The Poet", reciting poems with "sharp satirical or political themes". Gibson would emerge from behind a stage flat, wearing suit and tie and holding an outlandishly large artificial flower. He would bow stiffly from the waist, state "[Title of poem] — by Henry Gibson" in an ironic Southern U.S. accent, again bow stiffly from the waist, recite his poem and return behind the flat.

Gibson's routine was so memorable that guests on the program occasionally performed it, including John Wayne in his own inimitable style: "The Sky — by John Wayne. The Sky is blue/The Grass is green/Get off your butt/And join the Marine(s)!", whereupon Wayne left the scene by smashing through the flat. Gibson regularly appeared in the "Cocktail Party" segments as a Catholic priest, sipping tea. He would put the cup on the saucer, recite his one-liner in a grave and somber tone, then go back to sipping tea.

In 1962, Gibson recorded a comedy album on Liberty Records, titled Alligator. The album was reissued in 1968, now titled ...by Henry Gibson, following his success on Laugh-In. The liner notes perpetuated the origin story of being a country boy from Fairhope, Alabama. The album did not reach the Billboard Top 200 in either release. In 1968, Gibson appeared on the television show Bewitched as Napoleon Bonaparte. He appeared on Bewitched in 1970 as Tim O'Shanter, a leprechaun. Around this time, Gibson made recurring appearances in the 1969–1974 anthology Love, American Style.

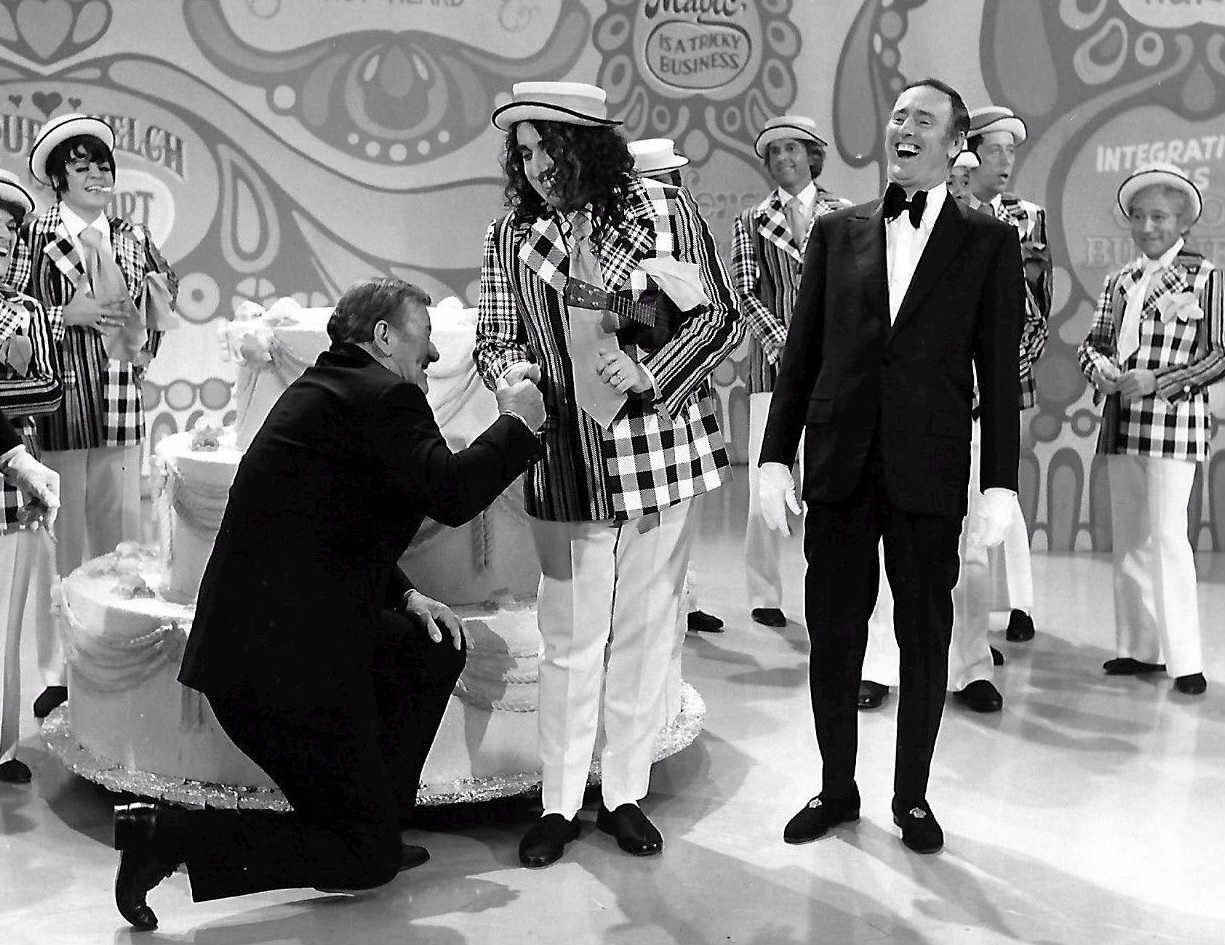
Rowan & Martin's Laugh-In, front L-R: John Wayne, Tiny Tim, Dick Martin. Back, L-R: Ruth Buzzi, Joanne Worley, Alan Sues, Dennis Roy Allen, and Henry Gibson. John Wayne was part of a comedy routine making believe that Tiny Tim had a strong grip

During the 1960s, Gibson had appeared on The Dick Van Dyke Show reading the poem "Keep a-Goin'", which he later turned into a song in the Robert Altman movie Nashville (1975). Notably, he was nominated for a Golden Globe Award for his portrayal of Haven Hamilton in the film and won the National Society of Film Critics award for the role. The Nashville Tennessean called Gibson "the male superstar most surely to be in line for an Academy Award" and hailed his performance as being "so real to Music Row habitués as to be frightening." Gibson appeared in three other films directed by Altman: The Long Goodbye, starring Elliott Gould, A Perfect Couple, and Health.

In 1978, he appeared in The New Adventures Of Wonder Woman as the arch-villain Mariposa. In 1980, he appeared on The Dukes of Hazzard as Will Jason (Squirt) in the second-season episode "Find Loretta Lynn". The same year, he played the leader of the "Illinois Nazis" in the John Landis film The Blues Brothers. This became one of his better-known film roles. In 1981, he appeared in The Incredible Shrinking Woman. In 1982, he played con man Henry Beemus on "The Love Boat", S6 E11 "A Christmas Presence", which aired December 18, 1982.

In the 1989 Joe Dante comedy The 'Burbs, starring Tom Hanks, Gibson played the villain. In 1990, he reunited with director Dante when Gremlins 2: The New Batch was released, performing a cameo as the office worker who is caught taking a smoking break on camera and fired by the sadistic boss. 1996 saw him playing an unusual dramatic role as former train conductor Robinson, in the independent film Color of a Brisk and Leaping Day with Michael Stipe. In 1996, he was also the voice of Adolf Eichmann in Keith Gordon's film adaptation of Kurt Vonnegut's novel Mother Night. In 1999, Gibson made an appearance in Paul Thomas Anderson's Magnolia as an eccentric barfly who antagonizes former child prodigy Donnie Smith, played by William H. Macy.

Gibson worked frequently as a voice actor in animation, most notably portraying Wilbur the pig in the popular Hanna-Barbera children's movie Charlotte's Web (1973). He later worked for the company again on the cartoon The Biskitts. Gibson's voice work was featured on The Grim Adventures of Billy & Mandy as Lord Pain, King of the Hill as reporter Bob Jenkins, and Rocket Power as grouchy neighbor Merv Stimpleton.

Later television work included a guest role on Star Trek: Deep Space Nine playing the Ferengi Nilva in the 1998 episode "Profit and Lace". Gibson also had a leading role in a season 5 episode of Stargate SG-1 entitled "The Sentinel" as the character Marul. His last major roles were in the 2005 film Wedding Crashers as Father O'Neil, and on the television show Boston Legal as recurring character Judge Clark Brown.

== Personal life and death ==
On April 6, 1966, Gibson married Lois Joan Geiger. They had three sons – Jonathan David Gibson, an executive at Universal Pictures; Charles Alexander Gibson, a director and visual effects supervisor; and James Gibson, a screenwriter. Lois died on May 6, 2007, aged 77.

Gibson died of cancer on September 14, 2009. He was cremated at Westwood Village Memorial Park Cemetery.

== Filmography ==
=== Film ===
Year	Title	Role	Notes
1963	The Nutty Professor	College Student	
1964	Kiss Me, Stupid	Smith	
1965	The Outlaws Is Coming	Charlie Horse	
1968	Chitty Chitty Bang Bang	Dancer	Uncredited
1972	Evil Roy Slade	Clifford Stool	
1973	Charlotte's Web	Wilbur	Voice
1973	The Long Goodbye	Dr. Verringer	
1975	Nashville	Haven Hamilton	
1977	The Last Remake of Beau Geste	General Pecheur	
1977	The Kentucky Fried Movie	United Appeal for the Dead Sketch	
1977	The Night They Took Miss Beautiful	Rolly Royce	
1979	A Perfect Couple	Fred Bott	
1980	The Blues Brothers	Head Nazi	
1980	HealtH	Bobby Hammer	
1981	The Incredible Shrinking Woman	Dr. Eugene Nortz	
1981	Tulips	Maurice Avocado	
1986	Monster in the Closet	Dr. Pennyworth	
1987	Innerspace	Mr. Wormwood	
1988	Switching Channels	Ike Roscoe	
1989	The 'Burbs	Dr. Werner Klopek	
1989	Brenda Starr	Prof. Gerhardt Von Kreutzer	
1989	Night Visitor	Jake	
1990	Gremlins 2: The New Batch	Employee Fired For Smoking	
1990	Tune in Tomorrow...	Big John Coot	
1992	Tom and Jerry: The Movie	Dr. Applecheek	Voice
1995	Gold Diggers: The Secret of Bear Mountain	Man	Uncredited
1995	Cyber Bandits	Dr. Knutsen	
1996	Color of a Brisk and Leaping Day	Robinson	
1996	Bio-Dome	William Leaky	
1996	Mother Night	Adolf Eichmann	Voice
1997	Asylum	Dr. Edward Bellichek	
1999	A Stranger in the Kingdom	Zack Burrows	
1999	Magnolia	Thurston Howell	
2002	The Year That Trembled	Ralph Tyler	
2002	Teddy Bears' Picnic	Clifford Sloane	
2003	The Commission	Police Chief Jesse Curry	
2004	Never Die Alone	Funeral Home Director	Uncredited
2005	Wedding Crashers	Father O'Neil	
2006	Trapped Ashes	Tour Guide	
2007	Big Stan	Shorts	Final film

=== Television ===
Year	Title	Role	Notes
1963	77 Sunset Strip	Eddie	Episode: The Toy Jungle
1964	The Beverly Hillbillies	Mr. Quirt Manly/Henry	Episode: An Man for Elly
1964	The Littlest Hobo	Ansel	Episode: The Great Manhunt
1964	Grindl	Private Stoner	Episode: Grindl, Girl Wac
1963–1964	The Joey Bishop Show	Henry Schultz	4 episodes
1964	My Favorite Martian	Homer P. Gibson	Episode: Danger! High Voltage
1965	Laredo	Ranger Freddy Gruber	Episode: The Pride of the Rangers
1965	Mister Roberts	Insignia	3 episodes
1966	The Dick Van Dyke Show	Doug Bedlork	Episode: Talk to the Snail
1966	F Troop	Pvt. Wrongo Starr	2 episodes
1967	Hey Landlord	Leroy	Episode: Aunt Harriet Wants You
1968–1970	Bewitched	Various	2 episodes
1968–1971	Rowan & Martin's Laugh-In	Guest Performer	84 episodes
1972	Evil Roy Slade	Clifford Stool	Television film
1972	Every Man Needs One	Walt	Television film
1972	Honeymoon Suite	Performer	Episode: First Pilot
1973	The ABC Saturday Superstar Movie	Mr. Grundy (voice)	Episode: The Mini-Munsters
1969–1973	Love, American Style	Performer	5 episodes
1975	Violence in Blue	Performer	Television film
1975	Get Christie Love!	Garber	Episode: Murder on the High C
1975	McCloud	Cookie Watkins	Episode: Showdown at Times Square
1975	Barbary Coast	Dasher	Episode: Sharks Eat Sharks
1975	Police Woman	Otto Otterman	Episode: Don't Feed the Pigeons
1976	The Bureau	Chief Peter Davlin	Television film
1977	Escape from Bogen County	Abe Rand	Television film
1977	The Night They Took Miss Beautiful	Rolly Royce	Television film
1977	Halloween is Grinch Night	Max (singing voice)	Television short
1975–1978	Wonder Woman	Performer	2 episodes
1978	Fantasy Island	Fred Wade	Episode: Bet a Million
1979	$weepstake$	Sometimes	1 episode
1979	The Halloween That Almost Wasn't	Igor	Television short
1979	Amateur Night at the Dixie Bar and Grill	Milt Cavanaugh	Television film
1980	The Dukes of Hazzard	Squirt	Episode: Find Loretta Lynn
1980	For the Love of It	George	Television film
1980	The Littlest Hobo	Jeff Farley	Episode: Ghost Rig
1981	The Nashville Gab	Art Schmeckle	Television film
1982	Magnum, P.I.	Ronald Mills	Episode: Mixed Doubles
1982	Trapper John, M.D.	Dr. Brownwell	Episode: Candy Doctor
1982	Simon & Simon	Herbert T. Dowd	Episode: Fowl Play
1983	Small & Frye	Dr. Calder	Episode: Endangered Detectives
1983	Quincy, M.E.	Max	Episode: Murder on Ice
1983	The Biskitts	Downer (voice)	13 episodes
1984	The Smurfs	Additional voices	1 episode
1984	High School U.S.A.	Vice Principal	Television film
1984	Cover Up	Milton	Episode: The Million Dollar Face
1981–1984	The Fall Guy	Various	2 episodes
1984	The New Mike Hammer	Simon Rondale	Episode: The Deadly Prey
1985	The Pound Puppies	Nabbit (voice)	Television short
1985	CBS Storybreak	voice	Episode: A Tale of Tales
1985	The Wuzzles	Eleroo (voice)	13 episodes
1986	The Twilight Zone	Mayor	Episode: Welcome to Winfield
1986	Knight Rider	Donald Crane	Episode: Voo Doo Knight
1986	Slow Burn	Robert	Television film
1986	Galaxy High School	Doyle & Aimee's Locker (voice)	13 episodes
1987	Long Gone	Hale Buchman	Television film
1987	Foofur	voice	13 episodes
1989	Around the World in 80 Days	Train Conductor	Miniseries
1990	Return to Green Acres	E. Mitchell Armstrong	Television film
1990	Timeless Tales from Hallmark	Sir Buffon	Episode: The Emperor's New Clothes
1990	Newhart	Tad Burrows	Episode: Father Goose
1988–1992	Murder, She Wrote	Various	2 episodes
1990–1991	MacGyver	Various	2 episodes
1991	Eerie Indiana	Mr. Lodgepoole	Episode: The Losers
1991	Evening Shade	Bud	Episode: Chip off the old Brick
1991	What a Dummy	Performer	Episode: Tucker's on the Air
1992	Fish Police	voice	Episode: The Codfather
1992	Tales from the Crypt	Stanhope	Episode: None But the Lonely Heart
1993	Sisters	Cyrus Calhoun	2 episodes
1993	Rugrats	Hairdresser/Counselor (voice)	Episode: Chuckie's First Haircut
1995	Santo Bugito	Mothmeyer	Episode: My Name Is Revenge
1995	Daisy-Head Mayzie	Cat in the Hat (voice)	Television short
1995	Escape to Witch Mountain	Ravetch	Television film
1995	The John Larroquette Show	Priest	Episode: Several Unusual Love Stories
1995	Coach	Ted Tilly	Episode: Turtle World
1996	Mad About You	Henry Gibson	Episode: Dream Weaver
1996	Duckman	(voice)	Episode: A Room with a Bellevue
1997	Adventures from the Book of Virtues	Dick's Please (voice)	Episode: Respect
1995–1997	Aaahh!!! Real Monsters	Mayor/Husband/Maurice (voice)	4 episodes
1997–1999	Sabrina the Teenage Witch	Witch Judge / Judge Samuels	4 episodes
1998	Star Trek: Deep Space Nine	Nilva	Episode: Profit and Lace
1998	Maggie Winters	Hotel Clerk	Episode: Angstgiving Day
1999	Providence	Mr. Berry	Episode: You Bet Your Life
1999	Sunset Beach	Wayne Landry	Episode: #1.667
1999	The Wild Thornberrys	Rhino (voice)	Episode: Born to Be Wild
1999	Total Recall 2070	Belasarius	Episode: Bones Beneath My Skin
1999	Hey Arnold!	Patty's Father (voice)	2 episodes
1999	The Amanda Show	Helicopter Pilot	Episode: #1.1
1999–2004	Rocket Power	Merv Stimpleton / Young Merv / Reporter #1 / Townsperson No. 3 (voices)	23 episodes
2000	Early Edition	Mr. Quigley	Episode: Luck o' the Irish
2001	The Luck of the Irish	Reilly O'Reilly	Television film
2002	Stargate SG-1	Marul	Episode: The Sentinel
2002	She Spies	Dr. Meelbow	Episode: The Martini Shot
2002	Charmed	Sandman	Episode: Sand Francisco Dreamin'
2002	Rocket Power: Race Across New Zealand	Merv Stimpleton (voice)	Television film
2003	The Guardian	Phil Hostetler	Episode: Big Coal
2003	Becker	Deputy Secretary	Episode: Chock Full O'Nuts
2004	Stripperella	Mr. Scrundle (voice)	Episode: Eruption, Junction
2004	Cracking Up	Dr. Bollas	Episode: Pilot
2004	Malcolm in the Middle	Frank Ralston	Episode: Kitty's Back
2005	The Batman	Bagely (voice)	Episode: Topsy Turvy
2004–2007	The Grim Adventures of Billy & Mandy	Lord Pain (voice)	3 episodes
2004–2008	Boston Legal	Judge Clark Brown	24 episodes
2005–2008	King of the Hill	Bob Jenkins/Travis/Jenkins (voice)	7 episodes
2006	Eloise: The Animated Series	Mr. Noblesse (voice)	Episode: Eloise Goes to School Part 1
2007	All Grown Up!	Dr. Schleprizzi (voice)	Episode: Trading Places

== Discography ==
- The Alligator (1962)
- The Grass Menagerie (1968)

== Books ==
- A Flower Child's Garden of Verses (1970)

== Awards and nominations ==
Year	Award	Category	Nominated work	Result	Ref.
1970	Golden Globe Awards	Best Supporting Actor – Television	Rowan & Martin's Laugh-In	Nominated	
1975	Golden Globe Awards	Best Supporting Actor – Film	Nashville	Nominated	
1975	Grammy Awards	Best Score Soundtrack	Nashville	Nominated	
1975	National Society of Film Critics	Best Supporting Actor	Nashville	Won	
1975	New York Film Critics Circle	Best Supporting Actor	Nashville	Nominated	
