= Dick Whittington (DJ) =

American disc jockey

- Born: 1934 (age 91–92); Philadelphia, Pennsylvania, U.S.
- Presenting career
- Stations: KROW, KSFO, KGIL, KABC, KFI, KIEV
- Style: Disc jockey
- Country: United States

"Sweet" Dick Whittington (born 1934) is a long-time Los Angeles disc jockey who has also appeared as an actor in movies and on television. As of 2025, he is the last surviving cast member of Duel.

== Career ==
From 1955 to 1958 at KROW (960 AM) in Oakland, California, Whittington hosted the Night Watchman overnight program, and, later, a weekday afternoon show, for the San Francisco Bay area. In the fall of 1958, he moved to KSFO (560 AM) in San Francisco, as host of the 9 p.m. to midnight program.

From 1965 to 1969, in Los Angeles, at KABC 790 AM, Whittington hosted on weekdays, a one-hour talk show and on Sundays, a 3-hour talk show.

In 1969, Whittington, in the Los Angeles market, hosted the morning drive time slot at KGIL AM 1260 in the "Sin Fernando Valley". For a brief time, he left KGIL to do the evening drive time slot at KFI AM 640. He was briefly heard in the late 1980s on KIEV (870 AM) and, for a few months in 1989, was back at KABC AM.

Many people regard his broadcast style as being ahead of its time. Rather than the "happy morning to you" type of radio personality, he often spoke on the air about things that bothered him and foreshadowed the Howard Stern era of speaking your mind. At stations where he was still spinning records, he would many times interrupt a song midway through saying, "I like it up to that point, then I get bored."

He was an ensemble member, for 12 episodes, in the second season, of the TV series Rowan & Martin's Laugh-In, as Sweet Brother Dick Whittington. Many of Whittington's TV and film roles were as a radio, TV, or news person. One of Whittington's film roles was as the disc jockey in the TV movie Duel, Steven Spielberg's directorial debut. He can also be seen briefly as a ring announcer in Martin Scorsese's Raging Bull.

== Radio credits ==
- KROW (Oakland), 1955–1958
- KSFO (San Francisco), 1958–1959
- KNOB, 1960–62
- KLAC, 1960–63
- KGIL, 1965–75 and 1978–85
- KABC, 1966–68
- KFI, 1975–77
- KIEV (870 AM), 1982 and 1988
- KHJ, 1983
- KABC, 1989–90
- KMPC 1990-91
- KNJO, 1994–95
- KKJL, 1999-?

== Television and film credits ==
- Rowan & Martin's Laugh-In
- The Incredible Hulk (1978 TV series)
- Raging Bull
- The Jeffersons
- Fantasy Island
- The Nine Lives of Fritz the Cat
- Almost Anything Goes
- Duel
- The Waltons
- Nanny and the Professor
