= Monte Landis =

Scottish-American actor (1931–2024)

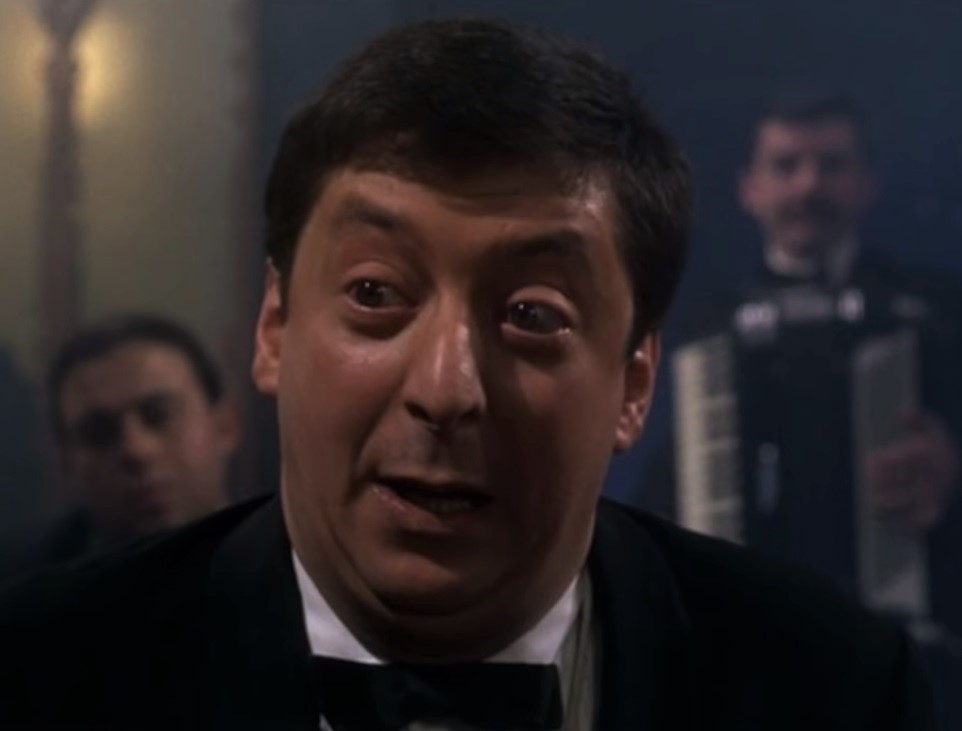
- Landis in Charade, 1963
- Born: Max Landstein; 20 April 1931; Glasgow, Scotland
- Died: 14 December 2024 (aged 93); Joshua Tree, California, U.S.
- Occupation: Actor

Max Landstein (20 April 1931 – 14 December 2024), known as Monte Landis, was a Scottish-American film and television actor.

Landis was perhaps best known for playing the comic foil in multiple episodes of The Monkees, most notably as Mr. Zero in the episode "The Devil and Peter Tork". He began his career in Britain before moving to the United States in 1963. Landis also had a career in Paris in the mid-1950s as emcee in cabarets and jazz clubs (Crazy Horse, Club Saint-Germain, etc.) – he played his own role later in Charade (1963) – and choreographer for the French vocal group The Blue Stars of France.

Among Landis' film appearances include turns in The Mouse That Roared (1959), School for Scoundrels (1960), Double Trouble (1967), Targets (1968), Myra Breckinridge (1970), Young Frankenstein (1974), Yellowbeard (1983), Body Double (1984), Real Genius (1985), and Pee-wee's Big Adventure (1985).

Landis died in Joshua Tree, California on 14 December 2024, at the age of 93.

== Partial filmography ==
- The Mouse That Roared (1959) - Cobbley
- School for Scoundrels (1960) - Fleetsnod
- The Pure Hell of St Trinian's (1960) - Octavius
- On the Fiddle (1961) - Conductor
- Play It Cool (1962) - Horace - the Beatnik Man
- Village of Daughters (1962) - Faccino
- Live Now – Pay Later (1962) - Arnold
- On the Beat (1962) - Mr. Bassett
- What a Crazy World (1963) - Solly Gold
- Charade (1963) - Master of Ceremonies at Les Black Sheep Club (uncredited)
- Double Trouble (1967) - Georgie
- Batman (1967, TV Series) - Basil
- Rowan & Martin's Laugh-In (1967, Pilot only) - Self
- The Monkees (1967–1968, TV Series) - King Hassar Yaduin / Wilbur Zeckenbush / Duce / Shah-Ku / Major Pshaw / Mr. Zero / Oraculo
- Targets (1968) - Marshall Smith
- Myra Breckinridge (1970) - Vince
- Hawaii Five-O (1971, TV Series) - Tony Madrid
- Young Frankenstein (1974) - Gravedigger #1
- Linda Lovelace for President (1975) - B.S.
- The Feather and Father Gang (1976–1977, TV Series) - Michael
- Yellowbeard (1983) - Prison Guard
- Body Double (1984) - Sid Goldberg
- Pee-wee's Big Adventure (1985) - Mario
- Real Genius (1985) - Dr. Dodd
- Sledge Hammer! (1987–1988, TV Series) - Hotel Manager / Scotland Yard Inspector McCall
- The Underachievers (1987) - Carruthers
- The Golden Girls (1987, TV Series) - Victor
- Heart Condition (1990) - Beverly Palm Hotel Waiter
- The Golden Palace (1992, TV Series) - Mr. Ricchutti
