= Pamela Austin =

American actress

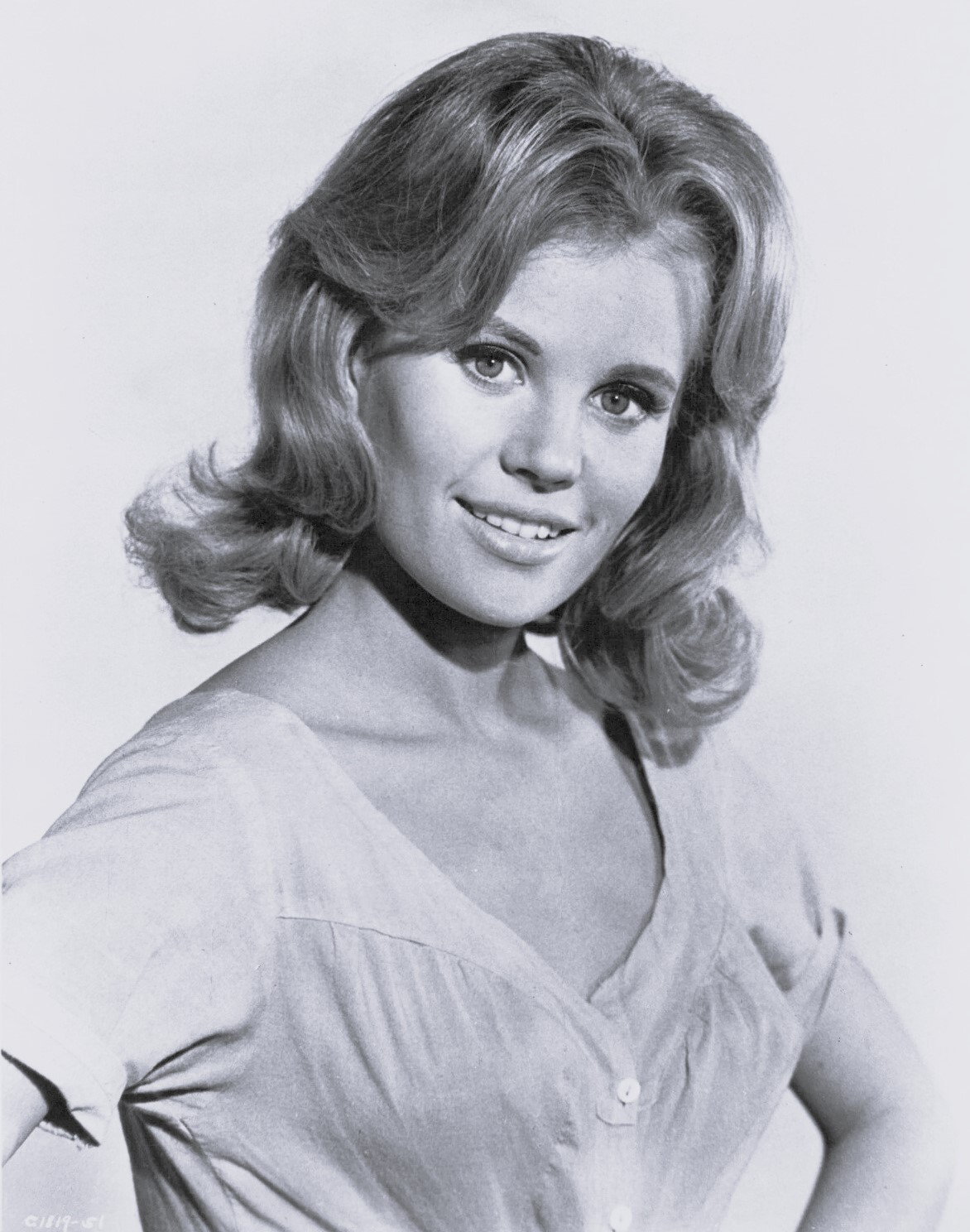
- Born: Omaha, Nebraska, U.S.
- Occupation: Actress
- Years active: 1961–1988
- Spouses: Guy Franklin McElwaine (m. 1965–1967) Leopold S. Wyler (m. 1974)

Pamela Austin is an American retired actress.

== Early life ==
Austin was born in Omaha, Nebraska. She spent part of her childhood in Europe, as her father served a tour of duty with the Air Force there. Austin studied dancing at Sacramento State College, and found work with the Tony Martin nightclub act upon arriving in Hollywood.

== Career ==
In addition to appearing in two Elvis Presley films, in 1964–1967 Austin gained fame for a long series of popular automobile television commercials (and print ads) for Dodge (the Charger, Coronet, Polara, and other models). As the perky "Dodge Rebellion Girl", she appeared in around twenty commercials as a damsel in distress: menaced by sharks, falling from a drawbridge, a roof, a cargo plane, etc. Her tag line at the end of each ad was "The Dodge Rebellion wants you!"

The ad series led to numerous film and television offers and a three-page profile in TV Guide (August 20–26, 1966). By 1968, Dodge executives mistakenly felt that Austin's popularity was overshadowing the cars. They began a new "Dodge Fever" campaign with a different model, Joan Anita Parker, who was instantly forgotten.

In August 1967, she starred in the adventure-comedy film The Perils of Pauline based on the silent cliff-hanger serial. Posters for the film referenced her Dodge commercials: That "Rebellion Girl" is dodgin' unbelievable perils...

In 1968, she was a semi-regular on the hit comedy series Rowan & Martin's Laugh-In during its first season. Austin performed in various comedy sketches, song-and-dance numbers, and pre-filmed segments, including an early music video for "Buy For Me The Rain" by The Nitty Gritty Dirt Band.

== Personal life ==
Austin married Guy Franklin McElwaine, a Hollywood press agent-turned-studio head, in Los Angeles on July 17, 1965. They divorced in June 1967. She married Leopold S. Wyler in Los Angeles on January 9, 1974.

== Filmography ==
=== Films ===
- Blue Hawaii (1961) – Selena (Sandy) Emerson
- The Chapman Report (1962)
- Rome Adventure (1962) – Agnes Hutton
- Critic's Choice (1963) – Daughter (uncredited)
- The Caretakers (1963) – Student Nurse (uncredited)
- Hootenanny Hoot (1963) – Billie-Jo Henley
- Kissin' Cousins (1964) – Selena Tatum
- The Perils of Pauline (1967) – Pauline
- Evil Roy Slade (1972, TV Movie) – Betsy Potter
- Agatha (1979) – Pierrot #2
- No Surrender (1985) – Organist
- The Dressmaker (1988) – Singer (final film role)

=== Television ===
- Surfside 6 ("Prescription for Panic"; 1961)
- Lawman (“Jailbreak”; 1962)
- 77 Sunset Strip ("The Steerer"; 1962)
- 77 Sunset Strip ("Reunion at Balboa"; 1963)
- Wagon Train ("Molly Kincaid Story"; 1963)
- The Fugitive ("Come Watch Me Die"; 1964)
- The Twilight Zone ("Number 12 Looks Just Like You"; 1964)
- My Three Sons ("Robbie and the Chorus Girl"; 1965)
- The Wild Wild West ("The Night of the Whirring Death"; 1966)
- The Virginian ("Girl on the Glass Mountain") (1966)
- It Takes a Thief ("Hans Across the Border", parts 1 & 2) (1968)
- Rowan & Martin's Laugh-In (six episodes; 1968)
- Love American Style ("Love and the Phone Booth"; 1969)
- Columbo: Blueprint for Murder (1972)
- Nearly a Happy Ending (1980)
