= Rowan & Martin's Laugh-In =

American sketch comedy television series (1968–73)

- Also known as: Laugh-In
- Genre: Variety show
- Created by: George Schlatter
- Directed by: Gordon Wiles; Mark Warren
- Starring: Dan Rowan; Dick Martin
- Theme music composer: Ian Bernard
- Opening theme: "Inquisitive Tango"
- Country of origin: United States
- No. of seasons: 6
- No. of episodes: 140 (+ one-time special and special episode) (list of episodes)

Production
- Running time: 45–48 minutes
- Production companies: George Schlatter-Ed Friendly Productions; Romart Inc.

Original release
- Network: NBC
- Release: January 22, 1968 – July 23, 1973

Related
- Turn-On; Super Laff-In (Philippines version); Letters to Laugh-In; Baggy Pants and the Nitwits; The Maltese Bippy

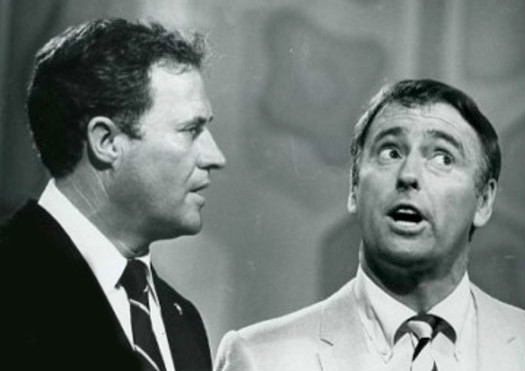
Dan Rowan and Dick Martin (1968)

Rowan & Martin's Laugh-In (often simply referred to as Laugh-In) is an American sketch comedy television program that ran for six seasons from January 22, 1968, to July 23, 1973, on the NBC television network. The show, hosted by comedians Dan Rowan and Dick Martin, originally aired as a one-time special on September 9, 1967, and was such a success that it was brought back as a series, replacing The Man from U.N.C.L.E. on Mondays at 8 pm (ET). It quickly became the most popular television show in the United States.

The title of the show was a play on 1960s Hippie culture "love-ins" or counterculture "be-ins", terms derived from the "sit-ins" common in protests associated with civil rights and antiwar demonstrations of the time. In the pilot episode, Dan Rowan explained the show's approach: "Good evening, ladies and gentlemen, and welcome to television's first Laugh-In. Now for the past few years, we have all been hearing an awful lot about the various 'ins'. There have been be-ins, love-ins, and sleep-ins. This is a laugh-in and a laugh-in is a frame of mind. For the next hour, we would just like you to sit back and laugh and forget about the other ins."

Laugh-In had its roots in the humor of vaudeville and burlesque, but its most direct influences were Olsen and Johnson's comedies (such as the free-form Broadway revue Hellzapoppin'), the innovative television works of Ernie Kovacs (George Schlatter's wife Jolene Brand appeared in Kovacs' shows), and the topical TV satire That Was the Week That Was. The show was characterized by a rapid-fire series of gags and sketches, many of which were politically charged or contained sexual innuendo. The co-hosts continued the exasperated straight-man (Rowan) and dumb-guy (Martin) double act that they had established as nightclub comics.

The show featured Gary Owens as the on-screen radio continuity announcer and an ensemble cast. Ruth Buzzi appeared throughout the show's six-year run, while others appeared in at least three seasons, including Judy Carne, Henry Gibson, Goldie Hawn, Arte Johnson, Jo Anne Worley, Alan Sues, Lily Tomlin, Dennis Allen, and Richard Dawson.

In 2002, Rowan & Martin's Laugh-In was ranked number 42 on TV Guide's 50 Greatest TV Shows of All Time.

== Episodes ==
Caricatures of Dan Rowan and Dick Martin by Sam Berman

Laugh-In was designed to be lightly structured and consisted mainly of short comedic sketches. Some of these would reappear multiple times throughout an episode with variations on a theme, while others involved recurring characters created by the cast. In others, cast members and guest stars would simply appear as themselves, delivering jokes or reacting to a previous sketch. In addition to the announced guest star or stars of the evening, some recurring guest stars would appear unannounced multiple times through a season (which was easy to accomplish given the show's non-linear taping sessions). A trademark of the series was its (even shorter) blackout sketches, often involving rapid-fire cuts between two or more scenes or camera angles, set to a six-note musical sting (or at times, an elongated 16-note version). These were used as transitions into and out of commercials, among other uses.

Each show started with a batch of sketches leading into Gary Owens' introduction, in which the cast and announced guest star(s) would appear behind open doors of the show's iconic, psychedelically-painted "Joke Wall". Owens would also insert offbeat lines in his monotone, deadpan style, in the introductions and occasionally throughout the episode, generally facing a microphone to his side with one hand cupped to his ear. (Owens' character loosened up and became hipper in later seasons.)

After more short sketches leading into and out of the first commercial break, Rowan and Martin would walk in front of the show's homebase set to introduce the show and have a dialogue that generally consisted of Martin frustrating Rowan by derailing his attempt to do a proper introduction via misunderstandings or digressions.

Eventually, Rowan would end the introduction and invite the audience to the "Cocktail Party". This live to tape segment consisted of all cast members and occasional surprise celebrities dancing before a 1960s "mod" party backdrop, delivering one- and two-line jokes interspersed with a few bars of dance music. (This was similar in format to the "Word Dance" segments of A Thurber Carnival, and would later be imitated on The Muppet Show.)

Another weekly segment was "Laugh-In Looks at the News", which began with the female cast members singing the segment's opening theme in a differently costumed set piece each week, often with the help of the guest star. The news varied in presentation over the years, but in the earlier seasons started with Martin reading the "News of the Present", with Rowan providing "News of the Future" and sketches depicting the "News of the Past". Alan Sues, in his "Big Al" character, would provide a typically clueless sports report.

"Mod, Mod World" was a group of sketches introduced by Rowan and Martin that fit into an announced theme. This segment is notable for being interspersed with film clips of some of the female cast members (most frequently Carne and Hawn) performing go-go dancing in bikinis to the segment's burlesque-inspired theme, with the camera periodically zooming into jokes or images that had been painted onto their bodies. The segment also usually included an additional musical number based on the topic, performed by cast members at the beginning and end of the segment, as well as in short bridges between sketches.

At the end of every show, after a final dialogue, Rowan would turn to his co-host and say, "Say good night, Dick", to which Martin replied, "Good night, Dick!", leading into the final Joke Wall segment. The cast would pop out of their doors and either tell jokes to the camera, to each other, or to Rowan and Martin, who stood in front, or just yell out, "Good night, Dick!" This would lead into and continue under the closing credits. There would be one final batch of skits, including a closing appearance from Owens. Up until the finale of Season 4, the last gag would be Arte Johnson's character, Wolfgang, the German soldier. He would slowly rise up from among some plants, look into the camera and say with a thick German accent, "Veeeeery eeenterestingk!" This would bring the episode to a conclusion - almost. The very last thing the television audience would hear is brief applause from several people, then one person continuing to clap several seconds after all the credits had rolled. This was the conclusion to almost every show up to the Season 5 finale. For Season 6, the television audience would hear a woman laughing (Ruth Buzzi) very strangely long after the credits had rolled.

== Production seasons ==
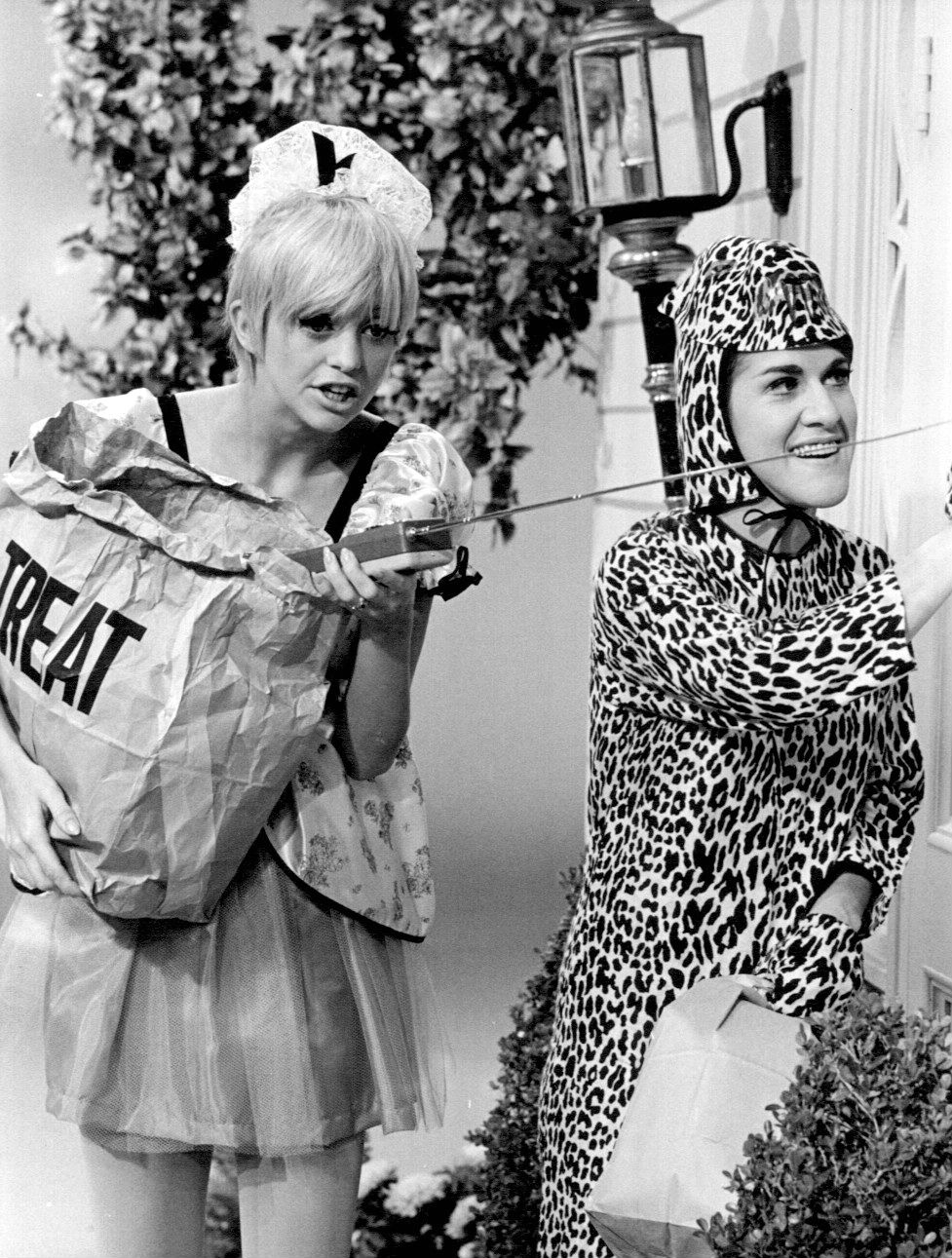
Goldie Hawn and Ruth Buzzi in a 1968 Halloween skit

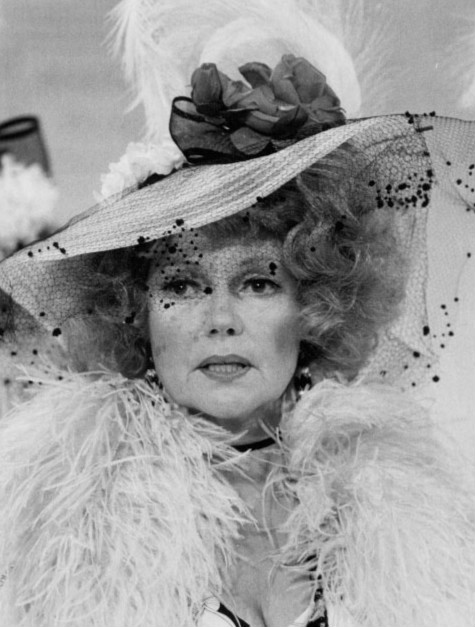
Rita Hayworth reprised her Sadie Thompson character on the show in 1971.

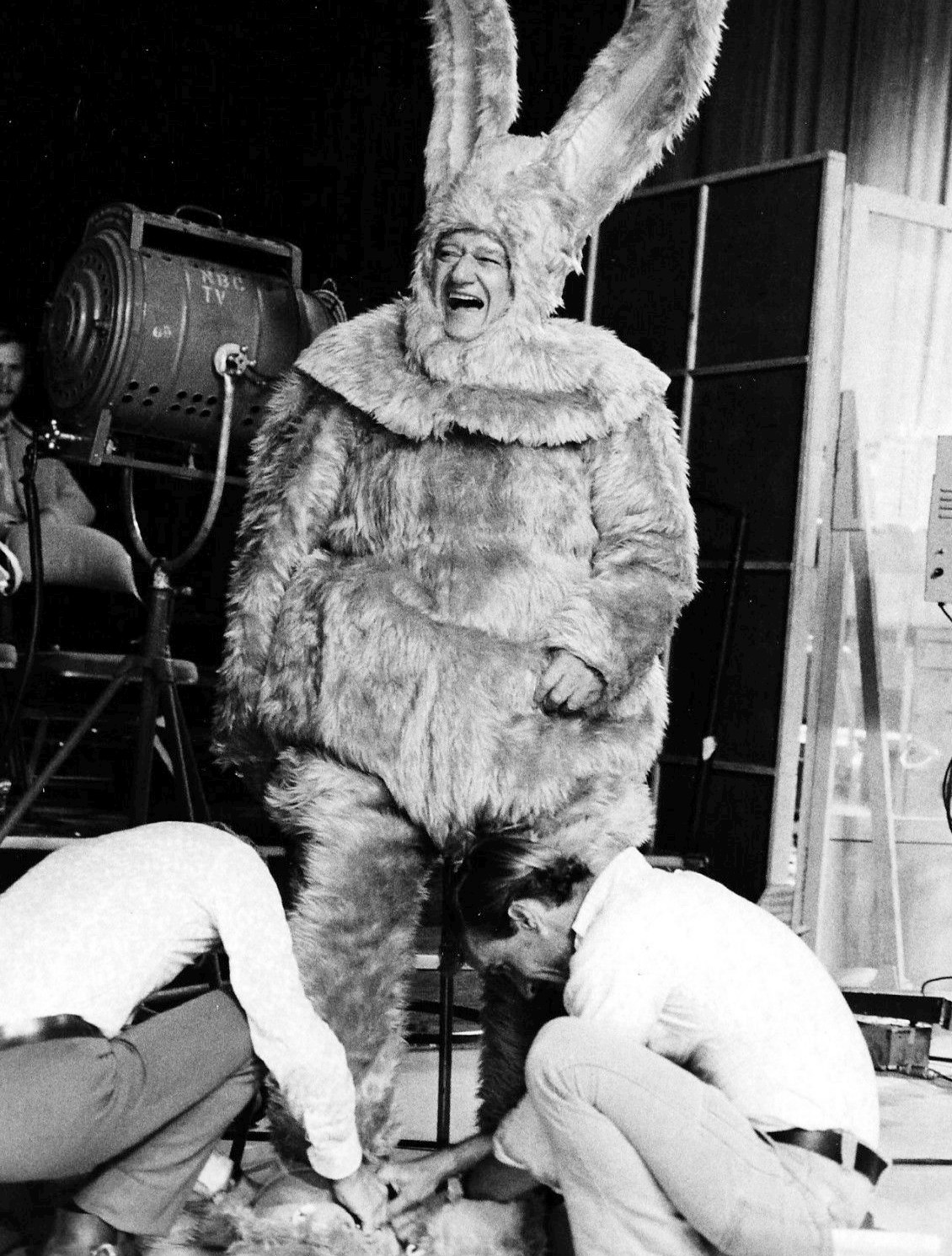
John Wayne being fitted for a giant bunny costume, 1972

=== 1967 special ===
September 9, 1967 was a one shot special, sponsored by Timex, with guest stars: Pamela Austin, Ken Berry, Judy Carne, Barbara Feldon, and featuring Ruth Buzzi, Henry Gibson, Larry Hovis, Arte Johnson, Monte Landis, Jo Anne Worley, and Paul Weston and His Orchestra.

=== Seasons 1–3 ===
Season 1 ran from January to April 1968 with 14 episodes. Gary Owens joined the cast in the first episode along with series regulars Pamela Austin, Eileen Brennan, Judy Carne, Ruth Buzzi, Henry Gibson, Larry Hovis, Arte Johnson, and Jo Anne Worley. Goldie Hawn joined the cast in the third episode. She had been under contract to Good Morning World at the time of the pilot. Eileen Brennan, Barbara Feldon, and Jack Riley made frequent appearances in both season 1 and 2. Riley usually did skits as President Lyndon Johnson.

Ian Bernard (1930–2020) was the musical director for all 6 seasons. He composed the show's theme song along with numerous other pieces.

Billy Barnes composed special comic and topical songs for the show's cast and guest stars. He was regularly seen playing a golden grand piano to accompany solos by cast members such as Ruth Buzzi, Alan Sues, and Jo Anne Worley and guest stars such as Dinah Shore and Lena Horne.

Cast departures: all but Hovis continued on into Season 2.

Season 2 (1968–1969): New regulars included Chelsea Brown, Dave Madden, and Alan Sues.

Arte Johnson now insisted on star billing, apart from the rest of the cast. The producer mollified him by having on-screen radio continuity announcer Gary Owens read Johnson's credit as a separate sentence: "Starring Dan Rowan and Dick Martin! And Arte Johnson! With Ruth Buzzi..." This maneuver gave Johnson the star billing he wanted, but it also implied that he was still part of the ensemble cast.

Cast departures: Chelsea Brown and Dave Madden left at the end of season 2. Judy Carne officially left the show after episode 11 but did return for a few appearances in season 3.

Season 3 (1969–1970): New regulars included Johnny Brown, Byron Gilliam, Teresa Graves, Jeremy Lloyd, Pamela Rodgers, and Lily Tomlin. Gilliam was a dancer in seasons 1 to 2 and promoted to cast member this season. Both Brown and Tomlin joined late in this season.

Cast departures and changes: After the season finale, Gilliam returned to being a regular dancer in The Cocktail Party scene and in occasional skits. He remained until the end of the series. Graves, Hawn, Lloyd, and Worley left after the season 3 finale. Tomlin remained until the series ended in 1973.

=== Seasons 4–6 ===
Season 4 (1970–1971): There were major changes to the set and new additions to the cast. The overall psychedelic look was replaced with a more avant-garde ambience. The Cocktail Party set now consisted of oversized cutouts of celebrity and historical figures. The show began to depart from both its hippie-esque "vibe" and humor and its leanings toward the counterculture of the 1960s. There were now significantly fewer jokes, less commentary about race relations, and less anti-Vietnam War sentiment.

New cast members: Nancie Phillips, Dennis Allen, writer-actress Ann Elder, and tap dancer Barbara Sharma.

Cast departures: Gibson left after episode 10, and Johnson left after the season 4 finale.

Notable visits for season 4: Goldie Hawn made a guest appearance in episode 3. After she left Laugh-In she made two movies, There's a Girl In My Soup and Cactus Flower, for which she won an Academy Award. Teresa Graves made two consecutive appearances toward the end of season 4.

Season 5 (1971–1972): Another new set design was introduced; it combined abstract art with avant-garde sensibilities. The Cocktail Party set now consisted of a main wall covered in mirrored tiles. The jokes, commentary, and overall humor became even more mainstream in Season 5, and there were more schtick and vaudeville-styled musical numbers. The few political jokes were mostly aimed at the Nixon administration. Around mid-season, the show began to air brief anti-drug messages at the end of each episode. In keeping with Laugh-In's groundbreaking nature, these messages strongly resembled 21st century GIFs.

New cast members: Hogan's Heroes alumni Richard Dawson and Larry Hovis; both had been part of season 1. Child actor Moosie Drier was also added, doing solo cameo jokes.

Cast departures after the season 5 finale: Brown, Elder, Hovis, Sharma, and Sues. Dawson remained until the series ended.

During season 5 the show also celebrated its 100th episode. Former cast regulars Carne, Gibson, Graves, Johnson, and Worley returned for the festivities. Frequent guest stars Tiny Tim and John Wayne were also on hand to celebrate. This was Wayne's first guest appearance since 1968.

Season 6 (1972–1973): This was Laugh-In's final season. Rowan and Martin assumed the executive producer roles from George Schlatter and Ed Friendly. A new set was designed that mixed abstract art with muted psychedelic colors. There was once again a visible studio audience. Ian Bernard, the show's musical director, and five other musicians became participants in the Cocktail Party scenes as the house band known as "Ian Bernard and His Band at Large". Owens would often incorrectly introduce them as "Ian Bernard and His Band of Irvine Quickies", " ...His Band of Lard" or "...His Band of Lies". Also new for the first few episodes was a group of six women dancers called "The Downtown Beauties", referring to the show's running joke of "beautiful downtown Burbank". The members of this group were in the Cocktail Party scenes and the group was featured for many of the musical numbers. The known names of these dancers are Janice Pennington, Mary Rowan (Dan's daughter), and Adele Yoshioko.

Cast (returning veterans): Allen, Buzzi, Dawson, Owens, and Tomlin. (New members): child actor Moosie Drier (promoted to cast member and teamed with child actor Tod Bass}, character comedian Brian Bressler (up to episode 10), comedienne Patti Deutsch, German model Lisa Farringer (episodes 13–24), Sarah Kennedy, folksy singer-comedian Jud Strunk, ventriloquist act Willie Tyler and Lester, and Donna Jean Young. Former regular Jo Anne Worley returned for two guest appearances, including the series finale.

== Cast tenures ==
*Indicates an extended guest performer and not a regular cast member

- All Seasons: Dan Rowan, Dick Martin, Gary Owens, and Ruth Buzzi
- Special (1967): Pamela Austin, Ken Berry, Judy Carne, Barbara Feldon, Henry Gibson, Larry Hovis, Arte Johnson, Monte Landis, Jo Anne Worley, and Paul Weston and His Orchestra
- Season 1 (1968): Eileen Brennan, Judy Carne, Henry Gibson, Goldie Hawn (episode 3 on), Larry Hovis, Arte Johnson, Roddy Maude-Roxby, Jo Anne Worley
- Season 2 (1968–69): Chelsea Brown, Judy Carne, Arte Johnson, Henry Gibson, Goldie Hawn, Jo Anne Worley, Dave Madden, Alan Sues, "Sweet Brother" Dick Whittington* (through episode 14), Charlie Brill and Mitzi McCall – "The Fun Couple"* (through episode 11), Pigmeat Markham* (through episode 14), Jack Riley* (episodes 4, 7, 12, 13, 16), J. J. Barry (episodes 15–19)*, Byron Gilliam* (dancer), Barbi Benton* (dancer)
- Season 3 (1969–70): Johnny Brown (episodes 22 and 24, originally introduced as "John Brown"), Judy Carne (through episode 12), Henry Gibson, Byron Gilliam (through episode 13, but continued as a dancer and in occasional cameos), Stu Gilliam* (episodes 14, 16, 19, 20, 26), Goldie Hawn, Teresa Graves, Jeremy Lloyd, Arte Johnson, Pamela Rodgers, Alan Sues, Lily Tomlin (from episode 15), Jo Anne Worley
- Season 4 (1970–71): Dennis Allen, Johnny Brown, Ann Elder, Henry Gibson (through episode 10), Arte Johnson, Nancie Phillips (through episode 17), Alan Sues, Barbara Sharma, Lily Tomlin, Byron Gilliam* (dancer). In possible support of "AIM" – The American Indian Movement that began in 1968 – the producers hired Betty Ann Carr, of Cherokee heritage, Sandra Ego, of Mescalero Apache heritage, and Linda Redfearn, of Cherokee and Anglo ancestry, as dancers in the weekly Cocktail Party scene.
- Season 5 (1971–72): Dennis Allen, Johnny Brown, Richard Dawson, Ann Elder, Larry Hovis, Barbara Sharma, Alan Sues, Lily Tomlin, Moosie Drier* (child), Mona Tera* (child, 6 episodes), Byron Gilliam* (dancer). Apparently, as an economic measure, producers Rowan and Martin gave performers the occasional week off, so not all cast members appear in every episode this season or the next. Apart from Dan and Dick, only Ruth Buzzi, Alan Sues, Lily Tomlin, and Gary Owens appeared in every episode.
- Season 6 (1972–73): Dennis Allen, Moosie Drier (teamed with child actor Tod Bass through episode 10), Brian Bressler, Richard Dawson, Patti Deutsch, Lisa Farringer (episodes 13–24), Sarah Kennedy, Jud Strunk, Lily Tomlin, Willie Tyler and Lester, Donna Jean Young. Like the previous season, not all cast members appear in every episode. Only Ruth Buzzi and Gary Owens were considered essential to the program and thus appeared in every episode.
- Dancers – All 6 Seasons (this list is incomplete): Terri Alexander, Jeanine Barrat, Barbi Benton, Sandahl Bergman, Betty Ann Carr, Pat Doty, Sandra Ego, Byron Gilliam, Jayne Kennedy, Millie Knight, Connie Kreski, Lisa Moore, Janice Pennington, Dolly Read (Dolly Martin), Linda Redfearn, Beverly Reed, Mary Rowan, Carol Richards, Adele Yoshioko.

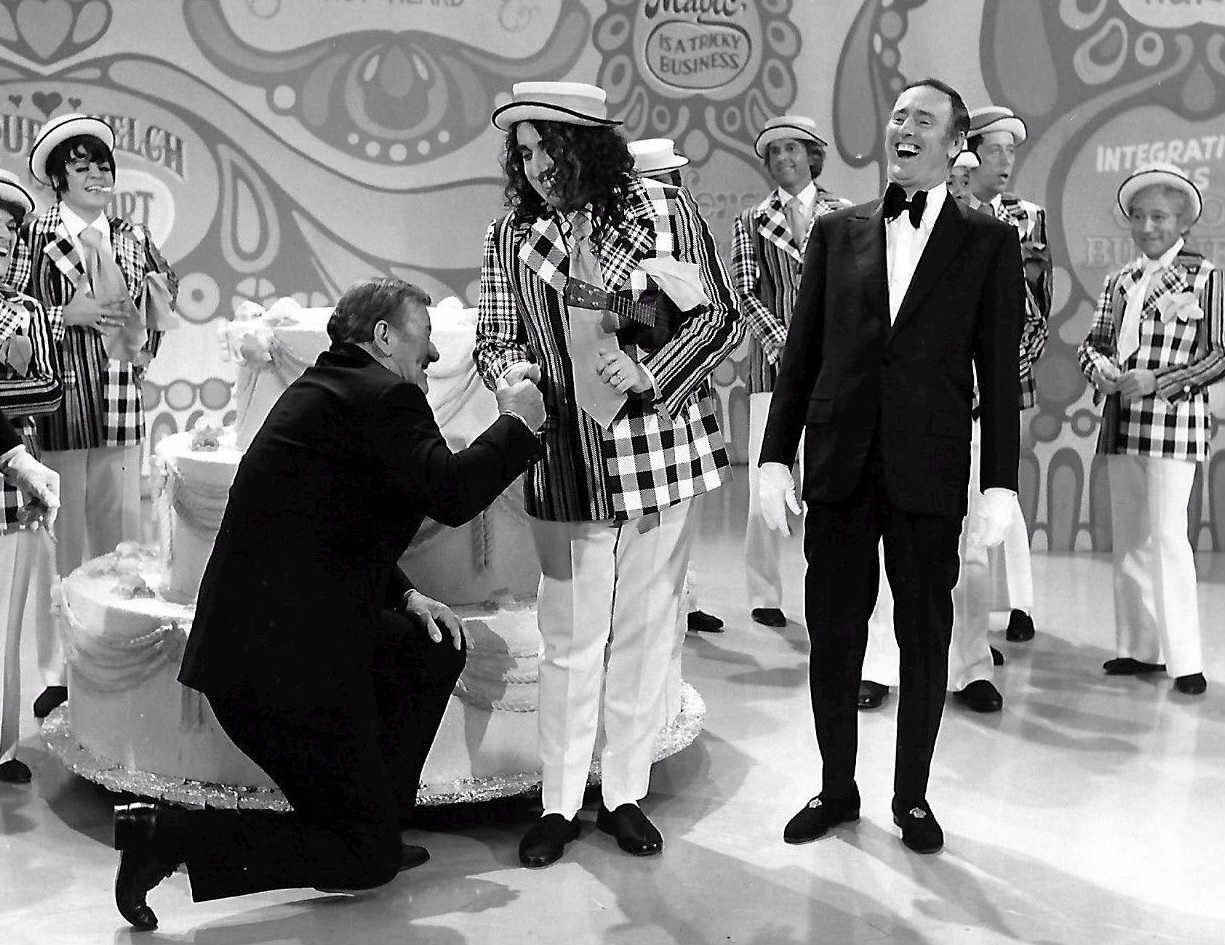
John Wayne and Tiny Tim helped Laugh-In celebrate its 100th episode in 1971.

=== Regular guest performers ===
- Jack Benny (seasons 2–4, 6)
- Johnny Carson (seasons 1–6)
- Carol Channing (seasons 3–5)
- Tony Curtis (seasons 2–3, 5)
- Sammy Davis Jr. (seasons 1–4, 6)
- Phyllis Diller (seasons 2–4, 6)
- Barbara Feldon (seasons 1–2)
- Zsa Zsa Gabor (seasons 2–3)
- Bob Hope (seasons 1–2, 4)
- Peter Lawford (seasons 1–4; Lawford became Dan Rowan's son-in-law in 1971)
- Rich Little (seasons 2, 4, 6)
- Jill St. John (seasons 1, 3, 5–6)
- Tiny Tim (seasons 1–3, 5)
- John Wayne (seasons 1–2, 5–6)
- Flip Wilson (seasons 1–4)
- Henny Youngman (seasons 2, 5–6)

The writers for Laugh-In were: George Schlatter, Paul W. Keyes (head writer), Larry Hovis (pilot only), Digby Wolfe, Hugh Wedlock Jr. and Allan Manings, Chris Bearde (credited as Chris Beard), Phil Hahn and Jack Hanrahan, Coslough Johnson (Arte Johnson's twin brother), Marc London and David Panich, Dave Cox, Jim Carlson, Jack Mendelsohn and Jim Mulligan, Lorne Michaels (before he became the producer of Saturday Night Live) and Hart Pomerantz, Jack Douglas, Jeremy Lloyd, John Carsey, Dennis Gren, Gene Farmer, John Rappaport and Stephen Spears, Jim Abell and Chet Dowling, Barry Took, E. Jack Kaplan, Larry Siegel, Jack S. Margolis, Don Reo and Allan Katz, Richard Goren (also credited as Rowby Greeber and Rowby Goren), Winston Moss, Gene Perret and Bill Richmond, Jack Wohl, Bob Howard and Bob DeVinney. Script supervisors for Laugh-In included Digby Wolfe (comedy consultant, season 1), Phil Hahn and Jack Hanrahan (season 2), Allan Manings (season 3), Marc London and David Panich (seasons 3–6), and Jim Mulligan (season 6).

=== Musical direction, production numbers and post-production ===
The musical director for Laugh-In was Ian Bernard. He wrote the opening theme music, "Inquisitive Tango" (used in Season 1 and again permanently from season 4), plus the infamous "What's the news across the nation" number. He wrote all the musical "play-ons" that introduced comedy sketches such as Lily Tomlin's character, Edith Ann, the little girl who sat in a giant rocking chair, and Arte Johnson's old man character, Tyrone, who always got hit with a purse. He also appeared in many of the Cocktail Party scenes, primarily Season 6, where he directed his band as they stopped and started between jokes. Composer-lyricist Billy Barnes wrote all of the original musical production numbers in the show, and often appeared on-camera, accompanying Johnson, Buzzi, Worley, or Sues, on a golden grand piano. Barnes was the creator of the Billy Barnes Revue of 1959 and 1960. For the entire 141-episode series of Laugh-In, including the pilot, the show's musical coordinator was West Coast bebop jazz pianist and composer Russ Freeman.

The show was recorded at NBC's Burbank facility using two-inch quadruplex videotape. As computer-controlled online editing had not been invented at the time, post-production video editing of the montage was achieved by the error-prone method of visualizing the recorded track with ferrofluid and cutting it with a razor blade or guillotine cutter and splicing with adhesive tape, in a manner similar to film editing. This had the incidental benefit of ensuring the preservation of the master tape, as a spliced tape could not be recycled for further use. Laugh-In editor Arthur Schneider won an Emmy Award in 1968 for his pioneering use of the "jump cut" – the unique editing style in which a sudden cut from one shot to another was made without a fade-out.

== Recurring sketches and characters ==
- go-go dancers with bodypaint
- Goldie Hawn Being Painted for Role
- Goldie Hawn as Painted Dancer
- Goldie Hawn as Painted Dancer
- Judy Carne, Hawn, Chelsea Brown

Frequently recurring Laugh-In sketches included:

- "Cocktail Party" – a live to tape segment consisting of all cast members and occasional surprise celebrities dancing before a 1960s "mod" party backdrop, delivering one- and two-line jokes interspersed with a few bars of dance music. (This was similar in format to the "Word Dance" segments of A Thurber Carnival, and would later be imitated on The Muppet Show.)
- "Mod, Mod World" – a group of sketches introduced by Rowan and Martin that fit into an announced theme. This segment is notable for being interspersed with film clips of some of the female cast members (Judy Carne, Ruth Buzzi, Goldie Hawn, Chelsea Brown, and others) performing go-go dancing in bikinis to the segment's burlesque-inspired theme, with the camera periodically zooming into puns, jokes and images that had been painted onto their bodies. The segment also usually included an additional musical number based on the topic, performed by cast members at the beginning and end of the segment, as well as in short bridges between sketches.

- "Sock it to me" – Judy Carne was often tricked into saying the phrase ("It may be rice wine to you, but it's sake to me!"), which invariably results in her (or other cast members) falling through a trap door, being doused with water, or playfully assaulted in various other goofy ways. The phrase was also uttered by many of the cameo guest stars, most notably Richard Nixon, though they were almost never subjected to the same treatment as Carne. The phrase was "retired" after Carne left the series. In the last season where Alan Sues was a regular, he would be the one who got water thrown on him after a ticking alarm clock went off.
- "The Farkel Family" – a couple with numerous children, all of whom wore round glasses, had bright red hair and large freckles – strikingly similar to their "good friend and trusted neighbor" Ferd Berfel (Dick Martin). The sketch employed diversion humor, the writing paying more attention to the lines said by each player, using alliterative tongue-twisters ("That's a fine-looking Farkel flinger you found there, Frank"). Dan Rowan played father Frank Farkel the Third; Jo Anne Worley, Barbara Sharma, and Patti Deutsch played his wife Fanny Farkel; Goldie Hawn played Sparkle Farkel; and Arte Johnson played Frank Farkel the Fourth. Ruth Buzzi played Flicker Farkel, who wore a frilly dress and would contort herself and roll on the floor and loudly say "HIIIIII!" in a very high-pitched voice. Two of the children were twins named Simon and Gar Farkel, played by cast members of different races (Teresa Graves and Pamela Rodgers in the third season; Johnny Brown and Dennis Allen in the fourth). By the final season the Farkel offspring had dwindled to only two children, played by Ruth Buzzi and the puppet Lester. All of the Farkel skits were written or co-written by David Panich.
- "Here Comes the Judge" – The judge, originally portrayed by British comic Roddy Maude-Roxby, was a stuffy magistrate with a black robe and oversized judge's wig. Each sketch featured the judge trading barbs with a defendant brought before him. On delivery of the punchline, he would strike the defendant with an inflated bladder balloon tied to the sleeve of his robe. Guest stars Flip Wilson or Sammy Davis Jr. would introduce the sketch saying "Here come da judge!", which was a venerable catchphrase by nightclub comedian Pigmeat Markham. Surprised that his trademark had been appropriated, Markham asked producer George Schlatter to let him play the judge himself; Schlatter agreed and Markham presided for the first half of the second season. After Markham left, the sketch was briefly retired until Sammy Davis Jr. donned the judicial robe and wig during his guest appearances, making the role his own. The character was introduced as "The Right Honorable Samuel Davis, Junior" (or "Right Hon." for short). Davis introduced each sketch with a spoken verse like "If your lawyer's sleepin', better give him a nudge! Everybody look alive 'cause here come de judge!" Davis would then strut off stage chanting "Here come de judge! Here come de judge!"
- "Laugh-In Looks at the News" – a parody of network newscasts. It first appeared in the pilot episode in a slightly different format, meant to show how a news broadcast would run if presented as a weekly variety show. The segment was introduced by the female cast members singing the segment's opening theme in a different costumed set piece each week, often with the help of the guest star, in a highly un-journalistic manner – with clever production numbers that had intricate choreography and amazing costume design. The sketch was originally called the Rowan and Martin Report (a take-off on the Huntley-Brinkley Report, Hovis had mimicked Brinkley in the Pilot/Special). The sketch itself featured Martin reading the "News of the Present", humorously reporting on current events, which then segued into Dan reporting on "News of the Future" (20 years later), and sketches depicting the "News of the Past". "News of the Future" segments, on at least two occasions, correctly predicted future events, one being that Ronald Reagan would be president in 1988, and another that the Berlin Wall would finally come down in 1989 (S2 E23). This segment was influenced by the BBC's That Was the Week That Was, and in turn inspired Saturday Night Live's "Weekend Update" segments (SNL creator Lorne Michaels was a Laugh-In writer early in his career). The News segments were followed by "Big Al" (Sues) and his sports report in seasons 2–5. After Sues left the show, Jud Strunk took over the sports segment ("reporting from the sports capital of Farmington, Maine") by featuring films of oddly-named events which were actual sports films played backwards. An example is the "Cannonball Catch", featuring a backwards film of a bowling tournament where the "cannonballs" (bowling balls) are caught one-handed by the catcher (the bowler) after rolling up the alley.
- "New Talent Time", also called "Discovery of the Week" in later seasons. It introduced oddball variety acts (sometimes characters played by regular cast members). Laugh-In writer Chris Beard (later known as Chris Bearde) took the "New Talent" concept and later developed it into The Gong Show.

- Outsider musician Tiny Tim – The most notable of these performances was in episode 1 and shot him to fame. He returned in the Season 1 finale, made several guest appearances after, and was there for the series finale.
- Several other episodes similarly featured the television debut of outsider musicians such as Wild Man Fischer and Legendary Stardust Cowboy. As with Tiny Tim's initial appearance, the act consisted of the eccentric and often off-key musicians performing while Dick Martin would stand next to them, looking dumfounded and silently reacting to the musician's obvious lack of talent.
- Actor Paul Gilbert (adoptive father of actress Melissa Gilbert) appeared in three episodes as an inept French juggler, introduced as "Paul Jill-bare".
- The Holy Modal Rounders, 14 October 1968
- 6'2" actress Inga Neilsen made appearances as a bugle/kazoo player who could only play one note of "Tiger Rag" and had to deal with Martin's advances. Martin, who showed mild interest in most New Talent acts, enthusiastically cheered her on despite the obvious lack of talent.
- Ventriloquist Paul Winchell appeared three times as "Lucky Pierre", whose puppets would fall apart or die on him.
- Arte Johnson would appear as his Pyotr Rosmenko character looking for his big American break, singing gibberish in a Russian accent.
- Murray Langston made an appearance. He would later achieve fame as the Gong Show's "Unknown Comic".

- "The Flying Fickle Finger of Fate Award" sardonically recognized actual dubious achievements by public individuals or institutions, the most frequent recipients being members or branches of the government. The trophy was a gilded left hand mounted on a trophy base with its extended index finger adorned with two small wings. The award was created by Paul Keyes and Jack Hanrahan, with the former credited with its name and the latter the trophy.
- "The Wonderful World of Whoopee Award" was a counterpart to the "Flying Fickle Finger of Fate Award"; it was described by Rowan as a citation "for the little man who manages to outfight or outfox the bureaucracy"; the statue was similar to the Finger of Fate, only it was a right hand (without wings on the index finger) pointing straight up, and with a hidden mechanism that, when activated, waved the finger in a circular motion.
- "The C.F.G. Automat" – a vending machine whose title was an inside joke for cast members who referred to producer Schlatter as "Crazy Fucking George". The vending machine would distribute oddball items that were a play on the name. Examples: The 'pot pie' produced a cloud of smoke when the door was opened; then the pie floated away. The 'ladyfingers' was a woman's hand reaching out and tickling Arte's face while another 'ladyfingers' door opened and picked his pocket.
- Many episodes were interspersed with a recurring, short wordless gag in which an actor repeatedly tried to accomplish some simple task like entering an elevator, opening a window or door, watering a plant, etc., which would fail each time in a different, surprising way (the object would move unexpectedly, another part of the wall or room would move, water would squirt the actor in the face from the object, etc.)
- Another recurring wordless gag involved one or more actors walking around the street in a jerky fashion (using stop-motion or low shutter speed filming) holding and turning a bare steering wheel, as if they were driving a car or actually were a car, with various sound effects to simulate honking, back-ups, collisions with each other, etc.
- From season 4 on, a variety of sketches or jokes used the word "Foon", usually as part of the name of imaginary products or persons (e.g., Foon detergent, Mr. Foonman). The names "Nern" and "Wacker" had been used similarly from Seasons 1 through 3.
- "Questions from the Audience / Dick's Costumes" – In the sixth season, Dan Rowan would ask the audience if anybody had any questions about the show or otherwise. As he was doing so (in which nobody in the audience ever spoke up), Dick Martin would come out wearing a wacky costume which Rowan would ask about, leading to a humorous exchange on the costume's subject matter.
- Dan Rowan – in addition to hosting, provided the "News of the Future" and also appeared as General Bull Right, a far-right-wing representative of the military establishment and an outlet for political humor.
- Dick Martin – in addition to hosting would also play the drunken Leonard Swizzle, husband of an equally drunk Doris Swizzle (Ruth Buzzi); and as a character always buzzing for an elevator on which the doors never closed in a normal way
- Gary Owens as an on-screen radio continuity announcer, who regularly stands in an old-time radio studio (acoustic tiles, large microphone), with his hand cupped over his ear, making announcements, often with little relation to the rest of the show, such as (in an overly-dramatic voice), "Earlier that evening ..."

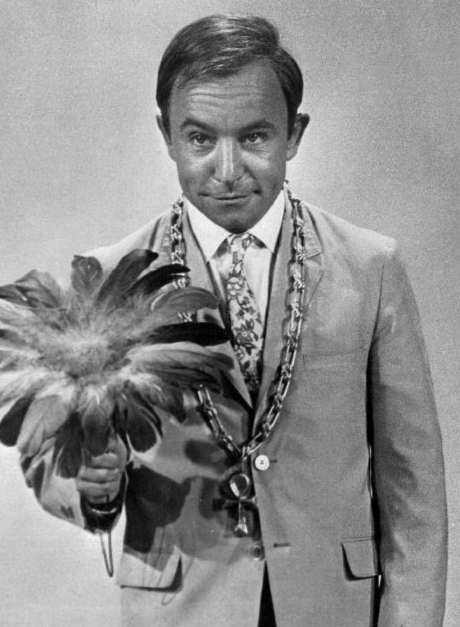
Henry Gibson, 1969

- Arte Johnson:
  - Wolfgang, the World War II German soldier who was unaware the war was over – Wolfgang would often peer out from behind a potted palm and comment on the previous gag saying, with a thick German accent, "Verrry in-te-res-tink", sometimes with comments such as "... but shtupid!" He eventually closed each show by talking to Lucille Ball and her husband Gary Morton, as well as the cast of Gunsmoke — both airing opposite Laugh-In on CBS – as well as whatever was on ABC. Johnson later repeated the line while playing Nazi-themed supervillain Virman Vundabar on an episode of Justice League Unlimited. Johnson also reprised his Wolfgang character in a series of skits for the second season of Sesame Street (1970–1971), and in 1980 for a series of small introductory skits with a plant on 3-2-1 Contact, during the "Growth/Decay" week.
  - Tyrone F. Horneigh (pronounced "hor-NIGH", presumably to satisfy the censors) was a "dirty old man" who was always after drab spinster Gladys Ormphby (Ruth Buzzi). As she sat on a park bench he would attempt to sit right next to her, eventually forcing her to the edge of the bench. Gladys always rebuked Tyrone's advances and would clobber him multiple times with her purse until he would make a final comment about his well-being and do a slow roll off the bench. Both Tyrone and Gladys later became animated characters (voiced by Johnson and Buzzi) in "The Nitwits" segments of the 1977 Saturday morning animated television show, Baggy Pants and the Nitwits.
  - Pyotr Rosmenko, a Russian man, stands stiffly and nervously in an ill-fitting out-of-fashion 1940s pin-striped suit while commenting on differences between America and "the old country", such as "Here in America, is very good, everyone watch television. In old country, television watches you!" This type of joke has come to be known as the Russian reversal.
  - Rabbi Shankar (a pun on Ravi Shankar) was an Indian guru who dresses in a Nehru jacket dispensing pseudomystical Eastern wisdom laden with bad puns. He held up two fingers in a peace sign whenever he spoke.
  - An unnamed character in a yellow raincoat and hat, riding a tricycle and then falling over, was frequently used to link between sketches. The character was portrayed by many people besides Johnson, including his brother Coslough (a writer for the show), Alan Sues, and Johnny Brown.
  - The Scandinavian Storyteller – spoke gibberish, including nonsensical 'Knock Knock' jokes in the Joke Wall. No one could ever understand him. Possibly inspiration for the Muppets' Swedish Chef character.
  - The Psychiatrist – a black haired, black-clad doctor who often attends the Cocktail Party during season four and talks about his experiments and patients with a thick Freudian accent.
- Ruth Buzzi:
  - Gladys Ormphby – A drab, relatively young spinster, in the Close-up segments, including Cocktail Party segments, she is portrayed as desperate for men. In the Arte Johnson segments, she is the eternal target of Arte Johnson's Tyrone, whom she rebukes, then attacks. When Johnson left the series, Gladys retreated into recurring daydreams, often involving marriages to historical figures, including Christopher Columbus and Benjamin Franklin (both played by Alan Sues). She typically hit people repeatedly with her purse. The character was recreated, along with Tyrone, in Baggy Pants and the Nitwits. Buzzi also performed as Gladys on Sesame Street and The Dean Martin Show, most notably in the Celebrity Roasts.
  - Doris Swizzle – A seedy barfly, she is paired with her husband, Leonard Swizzle, played by Dick Martin.
  - Kim Hither – An exceedingly friendly hooker, commonly seen in sketches or at the Cocktail Party propositioning people while leaning against a lamppost.
  - Busy Buzzi – A cold and heartless old-style Hedda Hopper-type Hollywood gossip columnist.
  - Kathleen Pullman – A wicked parody of televangelist Kathryn Kuhlman. This always helpful but overdramatic woman is always eager to help people.
  - Laverne Blossom - A former silent movie star (an homage to Alla Nazimova as Marguerite Gautier in Camille) with dark make-up around the eyes. She often attends the Cocktail Party in the later seasons.
  - Florence Lawrence - a meek wannabe secretary with giant teeth. Also attends the Cocktail Party during the second half of season four.
  - Alice Capone - tells jokes during the Syndicate news segment in Season 6. Wears cotton stuffed in her mouth to resemble Marlon Brando in The Godfather.
- Henry Gibson:
  - The Poet stood in front of, or held, an oversized flower and nervously read offbeat poems. (The actor's stage name was a play on the name of playwright Henrik Ibsen.)
  - The Parson – A character who makes ecclesiastical quips. In 1970, he officiated at a near-marriage for Tyrone and Gladys.
  - Would frequently just pop up and utter the phrase "Marshall McLuhan, what are you doin'?".
  - Also played a cub reporter for Busy Buzzi. While she was looking for a scoop, Gibson would come in with one (usually about Steve McQueen) that Buzzi would completely garble up to sound like something out of left field.
- Goldie Hawn is best known as the giggling "dumb blonde", stumbling over her lines, especially when she introduced Dan's "News of the Future". In the earliest episodes, she recited her dialogue sensibly and in her own voice, but as the series progressed, she adopted a Dumb Dora character with a higher-pitched giggle and a vacant expression, which endeared her to viewers. She frequently did a Donald Duck voice at inappropriate times, such as when she was expected to sing or do ballet.

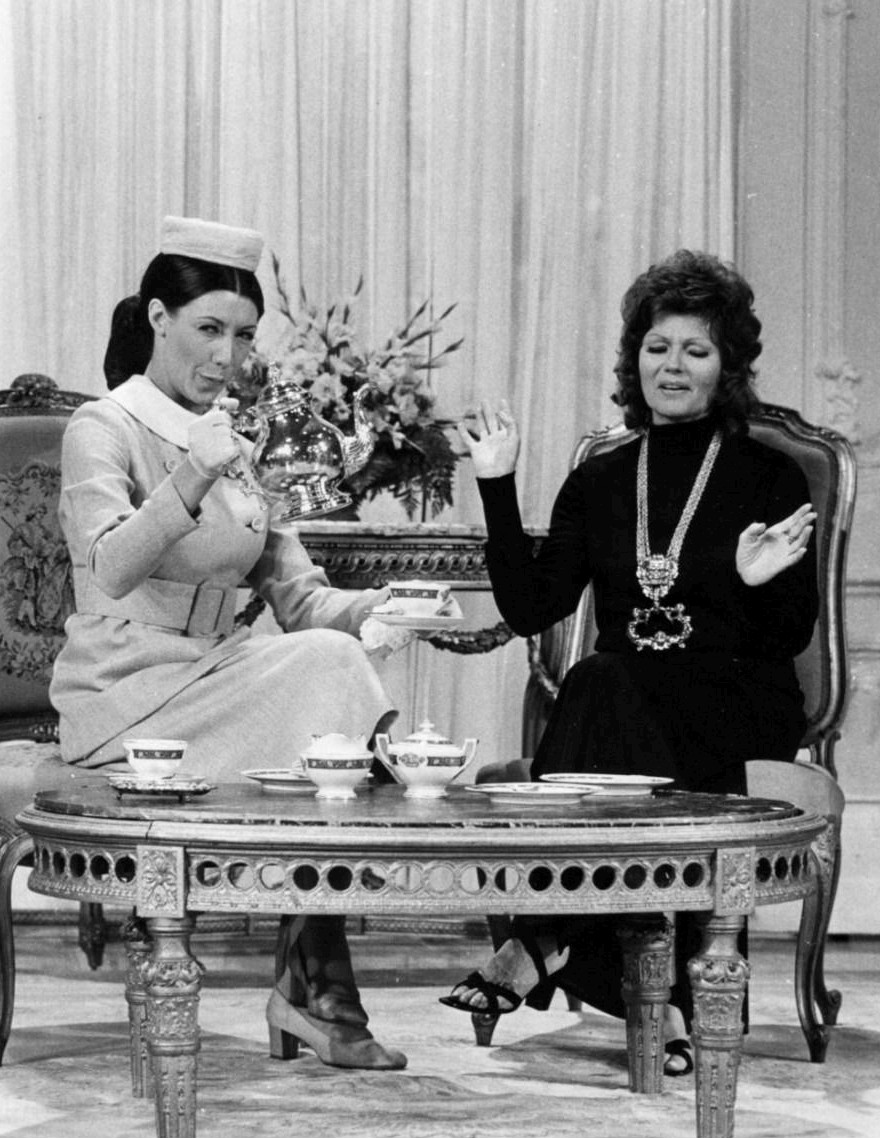
The Tasteful Lady (Lily Tomlin) entertains Rita Hayworth, 1971

- Lily Tomlin:
  - Ernestine/Miss Tomlin – An obnoxious telephone operator, she has no concern at all for her customers and constantly mispronounces their names. Her close friend is fellow telephone operator, Phenicia, and her boyfriend, Vito. She would boast of being a high school graduate. Tomlin later performed Ernestine on Saturday Night Live and Happy New Year, America. She also played the Ernestine character for a comedy album titled This Is a Recording and also made guest appearances as the character on shows and TV specials, such as Sesame Street, The Electric Company, Free to Be... a Family, and Sesame Street Stays Up Late!, in the last of which Oscar calls the operator and harangues her into hooking him up with five of his Grouch relatives. At the suggestion of CFG, Ernestine began dialing with her middle finger in Season 4, sometimes blatantly flipping "the bird" to the camera as a result. Censors never caught on – "we know she's doing something wrong, we just can't put our finger on it!"
  - Edith Ann – A 5 1/2-year-old child, she ends each of her short monologs with: "And that's the truth", followed by blowing a raspberry. Tomlin performs her skits in an oversized rocking chair that makes her appear small. Tomlin later performed Edith Ann on children's shows such as Sesame Street and The Electric Company.
  - Mrs. Earbore (the "Tasteful Lady") – A prim society matron, Mrs. Earbore expressed quiet disapproval about a tasteless joke or remark, and then rose from her chair with her legs spread, getting doused with a bucket of water, or with the sound of her skirt ripping.
  - Dotty – A crass and rude grocery checker who tended to annoy her customers at the store where she worked.
  - Lula – A loud and boisterous woman with a Marie Antoinette hair-do who always loved a party.
  - Suzie Sorority of the Silent Majority – clueless sorority college student who ended each bit with "Rah!"
  - The Babbler – A character who speaks exuberantly and at great length while digressing after every few words and never staying on one subject, producing an unbroken, incomprehensible monolog.

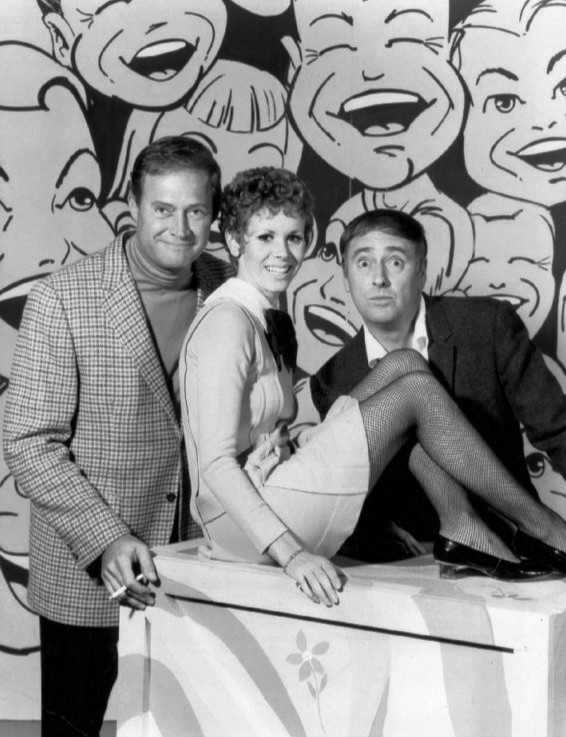
Rowan and Martin with Judy Carne in 1967

- Judy Carne had two characters known for their robotic speech and movement:
  - Mrs. Robot in "Robot Theater" – A female companion to Arte Johnson's "Mr. Robot".
  - The Talking Judy Doll – She is usually played with by Arte Johnson, who never heeds her warning: "Touch my little body, and I hit you!"
  - The Sock-It-To-Me Girl in which she would usually end up being splashed with water, or falling through a trap door, or getting conked on the head by a large club or mallet, or knocked out by a boxing glove on a spring.
- Jo Anne Worley sometimes sings off-the-wall songs using her loud operatic voice or displaying an advanced state of pregnancy, but is better remembered for her mock outrage at "chicken jokes" and her melodic outcry of "Bo-ring!". At the cocktail parties, she would talk about her never-seen married boyfriend/lover "Boris" (who, according to her in a Season 3 episode, was finally found out by his wife).
- Alan Sues:
  - Big Al – A clueless and fey sports anchor, he loves ringing his "Featurette" bell, which he calls his "tinkle".
  - He would dress in drag as his former co-star, Jo Anne Worley, including skits where he appeared as a "fairy godmother". imitating Worley's boisterous laugh and offering help or advice, to a Cinderella-type character, in a conversation full of double entendres.
  - Uncle Al, the Kiddies' Pal – A short-tempered host of a children's show, he usually goes on the air with a hangover: "Oh, kiddies, Uncle Al had a lot of medicine last night." Whenever he got really agitated, he would yell to "Get Miss Twinkle on the phone!"
  - Grabowski – a benchwarmer football player obviously not cut out for the sport. Example lines include "He pushed me! He pushed me!... they all pushed me!" and "No, you can't wear your ballet slippers on the field, Grabowski!"
  - Boomer – A self-absorbed "jock" bragging about his athletic exploits.
  - Ambiguously gay saloon patron – while Dan and Dick ordered whiskey, he would saunter up to the bar and ask for a fruit punch or frozen daiquiri.
  - In the last season, where he was a regular, he would be the one who got water thrown on him after a ticking alarm clock went off (replacing Judy Carne as the one who always got drenched).
- Pamela Rodgers – "Your man in Washington"; she would give 'reports' from the Capitol that were usually double entendres to give the impression that the Congressmen were fooling around with her.
- Jeremy Lloyd – scrunched himself into an ultra-short character a la Toulouse-Lautrec.
- Dennis Allen:
  - Lt. Peaches of the Fuzz – a stumble-bum police officer.
  - Chaplain Bud Homily – a droll clergyman who often falls victim to his own sermons.
  - Eric Clarified (a play on news commentator Eric Sevareid) – a correspondent for Laugh-In Looks at the News who further muddles up obfuscatory government statements he has been asked to clarify. Rowan would often go to another correspondent (played by Sues) to analyze Eric Clarified's statements in turn.
- Barbara Sharma:
  - The Burbank Meter Maid – a dancing meter maid who tickets anything from trees to baby carriages.
  - An aspiring actress who often plays foil in cocktail-party segments to another "high-society" character (Tomlin).
  - In season four, a Ruby Keeler-esque dancer (and arch-nemesis of Johnson's Wolfgang) who often praises Vice President Spiro Agnew.
- Johnny Brown lent his impersonations of Ed Sullivan, Alfred Hitchcock, Ralph Kramden, and the Kingfish from Amos 'n' Andy.
- Ann Elder as Pauline Rhetoric (a play on NBC reporter Pauline Frederick), the chief interviewer for the Laugh-In News segments.
- Moosie Drier and Todd Bass – Drier did the "kids news for kids" segment of the Laugh-In news. Bass teamed with Drier in Season 6 to read letters from a treehouse.
- Larry Hovis – the Senator, the Texan, David Brinkley, Father Time
- Richard Dawson – W.C. Fields, Groucho Marx, Hawkins the Butler, who always started his piece by asking "Permission to ...?" and proceeded to fall over.
- Roddy Maude-Roxby, Pigmeat Markham – Here Come Da Judge (Roxby for Season 1, Markham for Season 2)
- Dave Madden – would always throw confetti after "a naughty thought", usually a punch line that was a double-entendre. Once while kissing Carne, confetti erupted around him.
- Jud Strunk – sports news segment ("reporting from the sports capital of Farmington, Maine"), Vidal Bassoon (play on Vidal Sassoon) with the Bald News (who tears off a wig to reveal a bald cap each time).
- Patti Deutsch – Sister Mary Youngman (a nun who tells jokes a la Henny Youngman); Heavy Helen who presents the Hippy news.

== Merchandise tie-ins and spin-offs ==
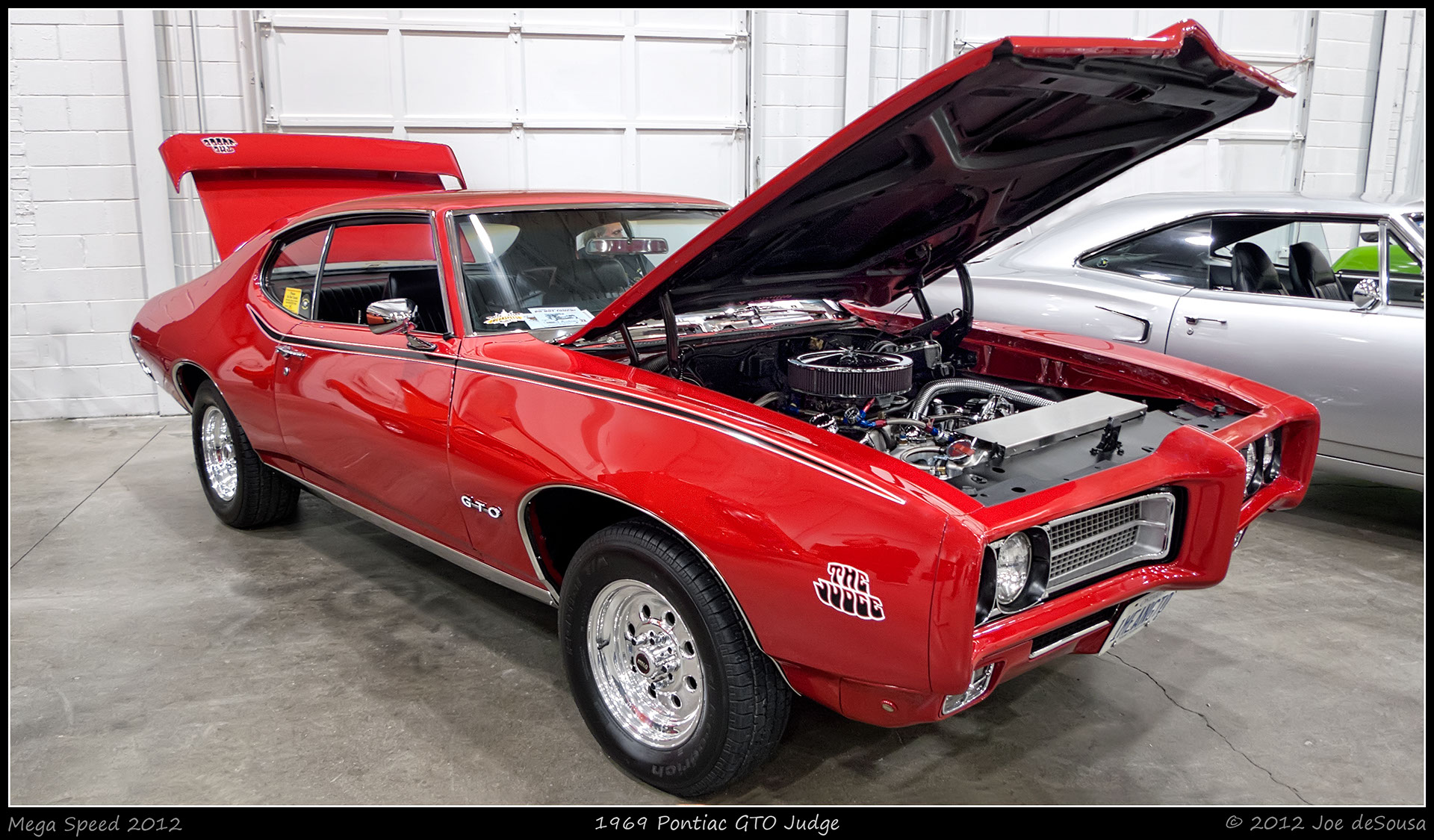
1969 Pontiac GTO "The Judge"

A humor magazine tie-in, Laugh-In Magazine, was published for one year (12 issues: October 1968 through October 1969—no issue was published December 1968), and a 1968–1972 syndicated daily and Sunday newspaper comic strip was drawn, without the actors' likenesses, by Roy Doty, and eventually collected for a paperback reprint.

In 1969, a Laugh-In View-Master packet was issued by General Aniline and Film (GAF); the packet featured 21 3D images from the show.

In 1969, the 1969 Pontiac GTO 2 Door Hardtop "The Judge" was an options package: rear spoiler, striped body paint and "The Judge" decals, and engines: 366 hp Ram Air III, or 370 hp Ram Air IV.

In 1969, Sears, Roebuck and Company produced a 15-minute short, Freeze-In, which starred series regulars Judy Carne and Arte Johnson. Made to capitalize on the popularity of the series, the short was made for Sears salesmen to introduce the new Kenmore freezer campaign. A dancing, bikini-clad Carne provided the opening titles with tattoos on her body.

=== Home media ===
On June 24, 2003, and then February 24, 2004, Rhino Entertainment Company (under its Rhino Retrovision classic TV entertainment brand), under license from the rightsholder at the time, SFM Entertainment, released two respective The Best Of releases of the show, each containing six episodes presented in its original, uncut broadcast version. In 2003, Rhino, through direct-response marketing firm Guthy-Renker, also released a series of DVDs subtitled The Sock-It-To-Me Collection, with each DVD containing two episodes.

On June 19, 2017, Time Life, another direct-response marketer, released Rowan & Martin's Laugh-In: The Complete Series on DVD in Region 1, in a deal with current rightsholder Proven Entertainment. The 38-disc set contains all 140 episodes of the series, complete and uncut, restored and remastered as well as many bonus features and a special 32-page collector's book.

On September 5, 2017, Time Life began releasing individual complete season sets on DVD, beginning with the first season. This was followed by the second season on January 9, 2018, and the third season on March 6, 2018. The fourth season was released on May 8, 2018. Season 5 was released on July 10, 2018. Finally, Season 6 was released on September 4, 2018.

DVD name	Ep #	Release date
The Complete First Season	14	September 5, 2017
The Complete Second Season	26	January 9, 2018
The Complete Third Season	26	March 6, 2018
The Complete Fourth Season	26	May 8, 2018
The Complete Fifth Season	24	July 10, 2018
The Complete Sixth Season	24	September 4, 2018
The Complete Series	140	June 19, 2017

=== Ratings and retrospective criticism ===
TV season, ranking, average viewer shares per episode

- 1967–1968: #21 (21.3)
- 1968–1969: #1 (31.8)
- 1969–1970: #1 (26.3)
- 1970–1971: #13 (22.4)
- 1971–1972: #22 (21.4)
- 1972–1973: #51 (16.7)

Critics' views in retrospect, while noting that the show was groundbreaking and unique, have also indicated that it has not aged well. Various aspects of the show are now recognized as being racist and other portrayals stereotyping gay people and women. While the show included Black actors and made occasional comments on racism, at the same time the show also featured White actors portraying Asian people in "yellowface" and offensive portrayals of Native Americans. The show's humor was generally appreciated at the time and some skits and jokes were even quite progressive; however, other aspects are often not seen as humorous by modern-day standards.

=== Revival ===
In 1977, Schlatter and NBC briefly revived the property as a series of specials – titled simply Laugh-In – with a new cast. The standout was a then-unknown Robin Williams, whose starring role on ABC's Mork & Mindy one year later prompted NBC to rerun the specials as a summer series in 1979. Also featured were Wayland Flowers and Madame (as well as his other puppet, "Jiffy"), former child evangelist Marjoe Gortner, former Barney Miller actress June Gable, Good Times actor Ben Powers, Bill Rafferty of Real People, and comedian Ed Bluestone. Barry Goldwater appeared in three episodes. Rowan and Martin, who owned part of the Laugh-In franchise, were not involved in this project. They sued Schlatter for using the format without their permission, and won a judgment of $4.6 million in 1980.

In 1987, George Schlatter attempted a revival of the program called George Schlatter's Comedy Club, the weekly half-hour program that appeared in syndication through King World Productions during the 1987–1988 television season. Featuring stand-up comedy routines alongside quick comedy sketches similar to Laugh-In, the series was hosted by Schlatter himself.

In 2019, Netflix produced a special tribute to the original series entitled, Still Laugh-In: The Stars Celebrate. Tomlin, Buzzi, and Worley appeared in the special.

=== International and American re-broadcasts ===
- (United Kingdom) The first four seasons were broadcast on BBC2 from January 1969 to November 1971. Some episodes from seasons 1, 2 and, 3 were retransmitted during late 1983 and early 1984. Early broadcasts had to be shown with a black border, as technology was not available to render the 525-line NTSC video recording as a full-screen 625-line PAL picture. This issue was fixed for later broadcasts.
- (Republic of Ireland) The series was broadcast on RTÉ One.
- (Australia) The series originally aired on the 0-10 Network in the 1960s and 1970s. It later appeared in re-runs on the Seven Network in the early 1980s.
- (Canada) CTV aired the series at the same time as the NBC run.

1983 saw the first 70 one-hour shows syndicated to broadcast stations (the pilot, first three seasons, and the first four episodes of season 4). Alternate recut half-hour shows (seasons 1–5, not including the pilot) were syndicated through Lorimar Television to local stations in 1983, and later on Nick at Nite in 1987 through August 1990.

The Vivendi Universal-owned popular arts/pop culture entertainment cable network Trio started airing the show in its original one-hour form in the early 2000s; the abbreviated 70 episode package was run.

In September 2016, digital sub-network Decades started airing the show twice a day in its original one-hour format, complete with the NBC Peacock opening and 'snake' closing. The entire 6 season run was supplied by Proven Entertainment.

In 2018, the original series became available in full on Amazon Prime Video.

In 2020, the partially complete series became available on-demand on Tubi.

As of 2023, four episodes air per weeknight on the Z Living channel.
