= Jilly Rizzo =

American actor

- Born: Ermenegildo Rizzo; May 6, 1917; New York City, U.S.
- Died: May 6, 1992 (aged 75); Rancho Mirage, California, U.S.
- Resting place: Desert Memorial Park
- Occupations: Restaurateur and entertainer
- Children: 3

Ermenegildo "Jilly" Rizzo (May 6, 1917 – May 6, 1992) was an American restaurateur and entertainer.

== Career ==
As a young man, Rizzo worked with his father delivering Italian ice to cafes. Rizzo opened Jilly's Saloon, a lounge on West 49th Street, then moved to 256 West 52nd Street at the intersection with Eighth Avenue in Manhattan. Jilly's Saloon was a popular celebrity hangout in the 1960s. Rizzo's long-time friend Frank Sinatra frequented the lounge. Rizzo later became one of Sinatra's chief aides, and was even referenced in Sinatra's adapted lyrics for "Mrs. Robinson" to avoid using the name "Jesus". Rizzo was also a frequent guest on Rowan and Martin's Laugh-In, where he would recite one liners in his monotone New York accent. Rizzo also appeared briefly in Sinatra's music video "L.A. Is My Lady", one of dozens of celebrity cameos in the 1983 production which received frequent airplay on the pop music cable channel VH1.

In 1990, Rizzo and five other men were convicted of fraud in relation to an $8 million loan scheme. He was given 1,000 hours of community service in a case presided over by judge Jack B. Weinstein.

== Death ==
Rizzo was killed by a drunk driver in Rancho Mirage, CA on his 75th birthday, May 6, 1992. He is buried in Desert Memorial Park in Cathedral City, California.

== Filmography ==
Film
Year	Title	Role	Notes
1962	The Manchurian Candidate	Jilly	Uncredited
1967	Tony Rome	Card player	Uncredited
1968	The Detective	Bartender	Uncredited
1984	Cannonball Run II	Jilly	
1985	Year of the Dragon	Schiro	
1987	The Pick-up Artist	Casino Floor Manager	
1990	Eternity	Jilly	(final film role)

Television
Year	Title	Role	Notes
1970–1971	Rowan & Martin's Laugh-In	Himself	8 episodes
1977	The Dean Martin Celebrity Roast: Frank Sinatra	Himself	Television special
1974–1978	Kojak	Various roles	2 episodes

== See also ==
- The Night We Called It a Day
