= Shirl Bernheim =

American actress

- Born: September 21, 1921; Manhattan, New York City, United States
- Died: March 30, 2009 (aged 87); Englewood, New Jersey, United States
- Occupation: Actress

Shirl Bernheim (September 21, 1921 in Manhattan, New York City – March 30, 2009 in Englewood, New Jersey) was an American actress of film and television.

She was born as Shirley Raphael and made her sole appearance on Broadway in her debut in 2000, aged 79, in The Tale of the Allergist's Wife, in which she played "Frieda", the mother of the lead character (played by Linda Lavin and Valerie Harper, consecutively). Bernheim appeared in the play from October 12, 2000, until May 26, 2002.

Starting late in the industry, using her married name as her professional name, Bernheim's film and television career began in 1978 and lasted until 2004, with her second appearance on Law & Order. From 1978 to 1979 she played "Polly the Prize Lady" on The Cheap Show, which was hosted by Dick Martin.

== Filmography ==
Film
Year	Title	Role	Notes
1987	Anna	Woman #3 / Woman in White Veil	
1988	The Laser Man	Mahjong lady	
1990	Frankenhooker	Elizabeth's Grandmother	
1996	Sudden Manhattan	Old Lady #1	
1996	I'm Not Rappaport	Russian Lady	
1997	Commandments	Sylvia Andrew	
1997	Broadway Damage	Tourists	
1997	Anima		
1999	Just Looking	Mrs. Glantz	
