= Martha Hyer =

American actress (1924–2014)

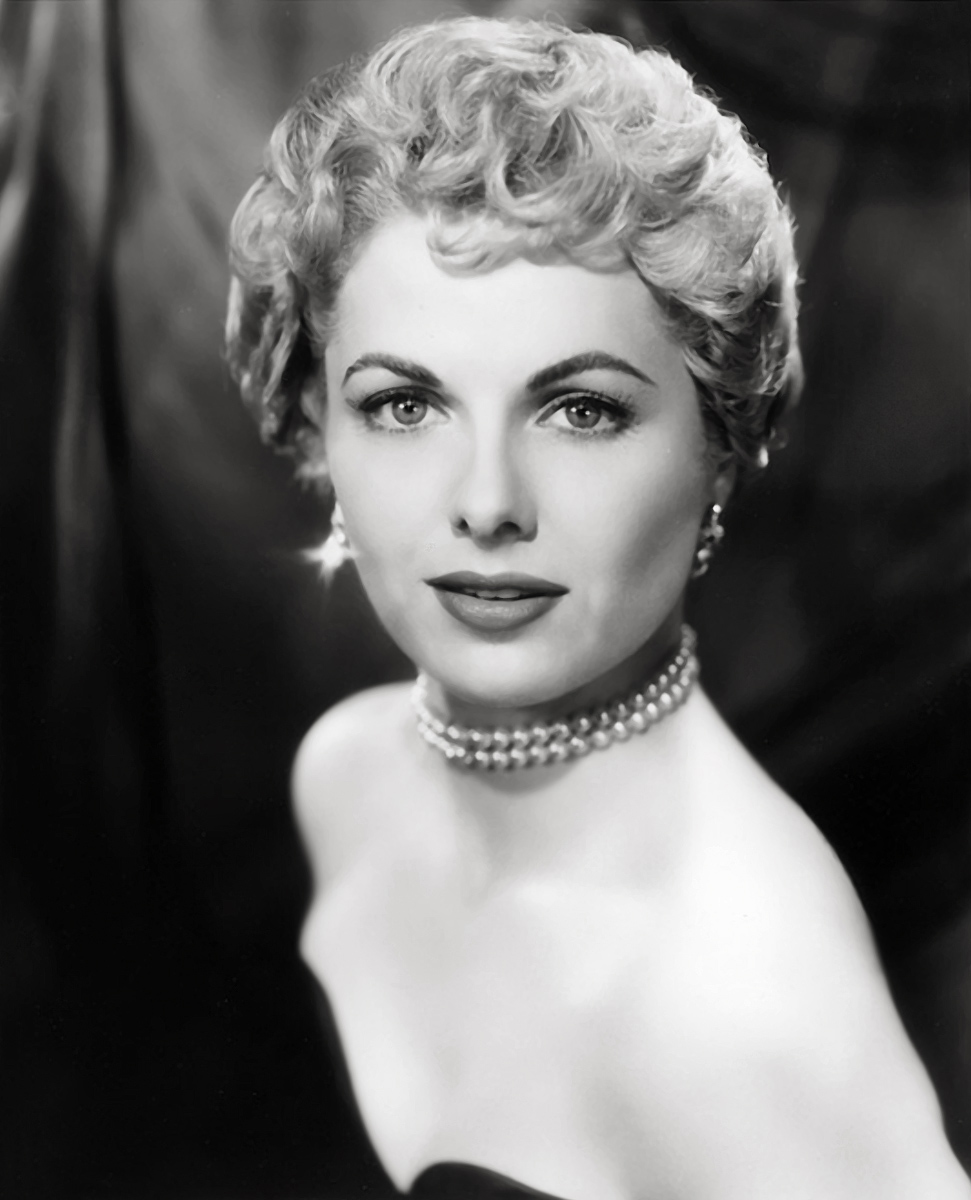
- Hyer in 1954
- Born: August 10, 1924; Fort Worth, Texas, U.S.
- Died: May 31, 2014 (aged 89); Santa Fe, New Mexico, U.S.
- Education: Northwestern University
- Occupation: Actress
- Years active: 1946–1974
- Spouses: C. Ray Stahl (m. 1951; div. 1954) Hal B. Wallis (m. 1966; died 1986)

Martha Hyer (August 10, 1924 – May 31, 2014) was an American actress who was nominated for the Academy Award for Best Supporting Actress for her role in Some Came Running (1958). Her autobiography, Finding My Way: A Hollywood Memoir, was published in 1990.

== Early and personal life ==
Martha Hyer was born in Fort Worth, Texas, into a wealthy family, the daughter of Julien Capers Hyer, an attorney and judge, and Agnes Rebecca (née Barnhart). She was the middle of three sisters, with Agnes Ann and Jeanne. Hyer graduated from Arlington Heights High School and then from Northwestern University with a degree in drama. She was in the sorority Pi Beta Phi with actress Patricia Neal. She moved to California to study at the Pasadena Playhouse, and was signed to a film contract with RKO.

Hyer married producer C. Ray Stahl whom she divorced after three years, and was married to producer Hal B. Wallis until his death in 1986. She converted to Judaism, Wallis' religion, after their marriage. Wallis and Hyer contributed funds toward the construction of the Hal and Martha Hyer Wallis Theatre, a black box theater, at Northwestern University.

== Film and television ==
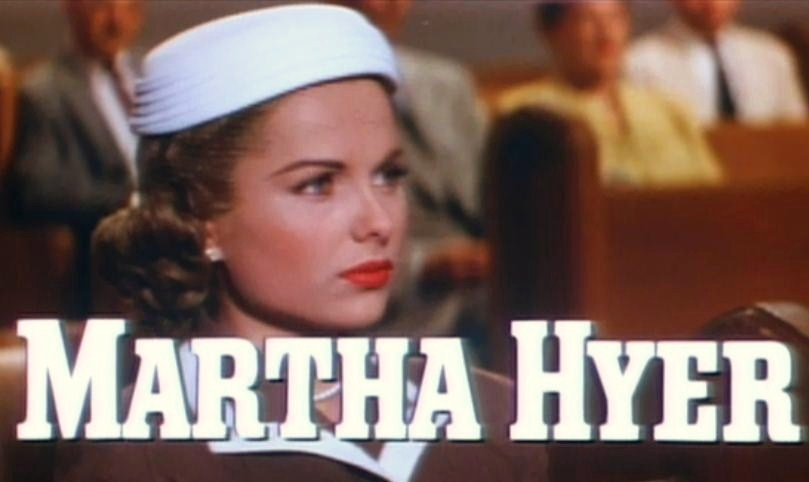
Hyer in trailer for Battle Hymn (1957)

Hyer's first film appearance was an uncredited speaking part in The Locket (1946). She appeared in uncredited and bit roles in B-movies for the next few years, occasionally working on television, as well. Eventually, she moved up the ranks, and starting in 1954, began receiving better roles, becoming a popular actress in Hollywood for the next decade.

In 1953, Hyer had a supporting role in the drama So Big, directed by Robert Wise. She appeared as Janie in Abbott and Costello Go To Mars (1953), in Wyoming Renegades (1954) and The Battle of Rogue River (1954), and a musical comedy, Lucky Me (1954). She played Elizabeth Tyson, a socialite, in the Oscar-winning film Sabrina (1954). Hyer starred in the comedy Francis in the Navy (1955), and played the lead in a 1956 televised version of Jezebel for Lux Video Theatre.

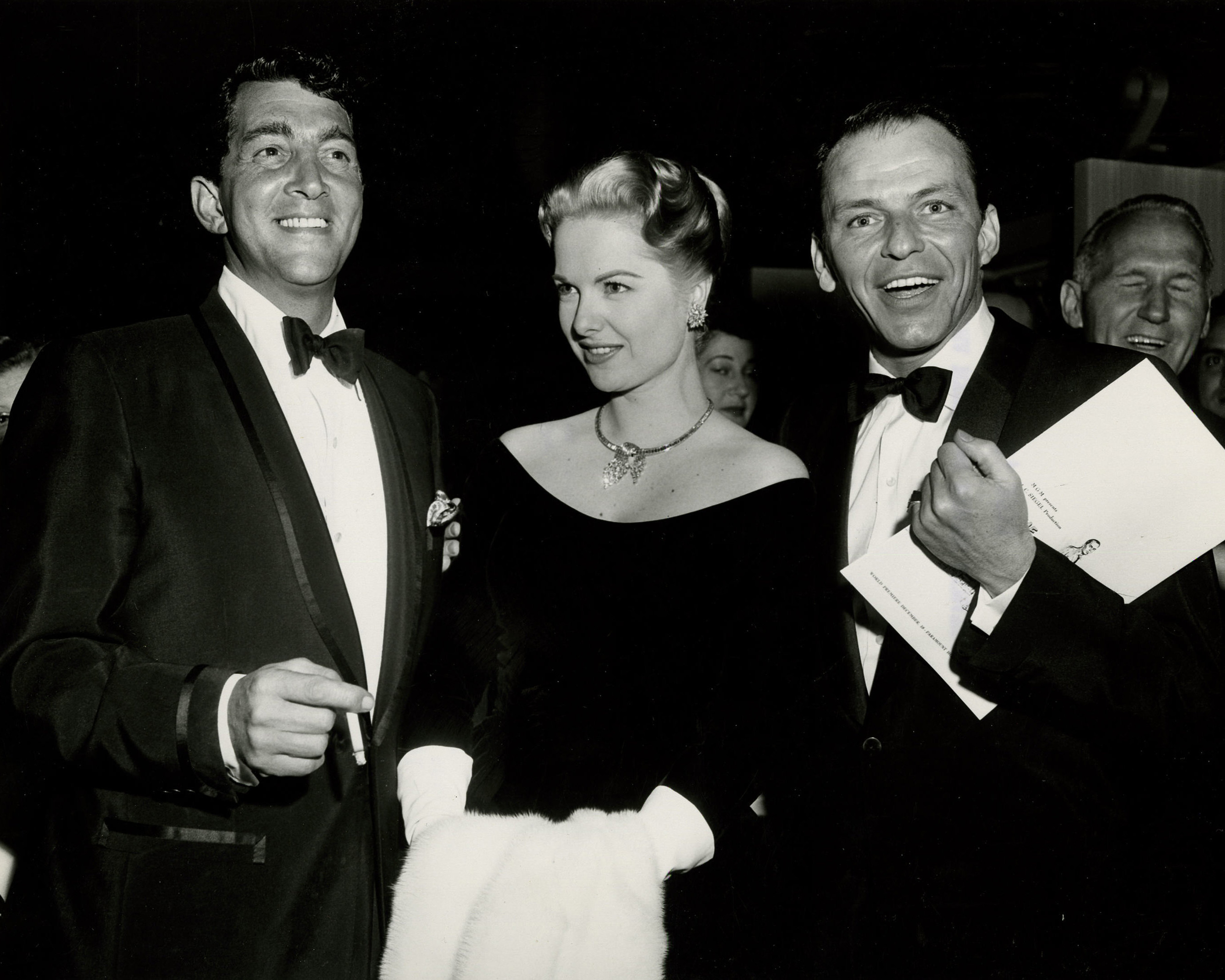
Flanked by Dean Martin and Frank Sinatra at Some Came Running (1958) premiere

Hyer had supporting roles in the war story Battle Hymn (1957) and in the drama Mister Cory (1957), directed by Blake Edwards. She was featured in the comedy Kelly and Me, and as Cornelia Bullock in the 1957 remake of My Man Godfrey. In 1958, Hyer appeared in a Playhouse 90 televised version of Reunion by Merle Miller, and in films Paris Holiday (1958) and Houseboat (1958). Hyer was the foil for Dan Rowan and Dick Martin in Once Upon a Horse... (1958) directed by Hal Kanter. She was nominated for the Academy Award for Best Supporting Actress for the 1958 drama Some Came Running, directed by Vincente Minnelli,

Hyer had supporting roles in The Big Fisherman (1959) and The Best of Everything (1959). She played the role of Hannah Haley in the Rawhide episode "Incident West of Lano".

In 1960, Hyer appeared in a supporting role in Ice Palace, and The Last Time I Saw Archie (1961). She was in A Girl Named Tamiko (1962), Wives and Lovers (1963), and The Carpetbaggers (1964).

Hyer appeared in two episodes of the Alfred Hitchcock Hour, "A Piece of Action" in 1962 and "Crimson Witness" in 1965. In 1965, she played the lead in The Sons of Katie Elder, and played Margaret Marshall, a wealthy, seductive woman in an episode of the television series Bewitched.

In 1966, Hyer was in The Chase, directed by Arthur Penn. On television, she guest-starred on The Beverly Hillbillies in the episode "The Richest Woman", in which she plays Tracy Richards, the world's richest woman. Hyer starred in the film drama Some May Live, the crime comedy The Happening, and the suspense film Crossplot. In 1967, she guest-starred on Family Affair in the episode "Star Dust", in which she plays Carol Haven, a movie star.

Hyer’s final film role was in The Day of the Wolves (1971) and her final television role was in a 1974 episode of McCloud. At age 50, she retired from acting. In 1975, she wrote the screenplay to the Western Rooster Cogburn, starring John Wayne and Katharine Hepburn.

== Retirement and death ==
On May 31, 2014, Hyer died at the age of 89 at her home in Santa Fe, New Mexico.

== Selected filmography ==
Year	Title	Role	Notes
1946	The Locket	Bridesmaid	Uncredited
1947	Born to Kill	Maid	Uncredited
1947	Thunder Mountain	Ellie Jorth	
1947	The Woman on the Beach	Mrs. Barton	Uncredited
1947	The Judge Steps Out	Catherine Bailey Struthers III	
1948	The Velvet Touch	Helen Adams	
1948	Gun Smugglers	Judy Davis	
1949	Rustlers	Ruth Abbott	
1949	Roughshod	Marcia	
1949	The Clay Pigeon	Miss Harwick, Wheeler's Receptionist	
1950	Outcast of Black Mesa	Ruth Dorn	
1950	Salt Lake Raiders	Helen Thornton	
1950	The Lawless	Caroline Tyler	
1950	Frisco Tornado	Jean Martin	
1950	The Kangaroo Kid	Mary Corbett	
1951	Oriental Evil	Cheryl Banning	
1952	Wild Stallion	Caroline Cullen	
1952	Geisha Girl	Peggy Burnes	
1952	Yukon Gold	Marie Briand	
1953	Abbott and Costello Go to Mars	Janie Howe	
1953	So Big	Paula Hempel	
1954	Riders to the Stars	Dr. Jane Flynn	
1954	The Scarlet Spear	Christine	
1954	The Battle of Rogue River	Brett McClain	
1954	Lucky Me	Lorraine Thayer	
1954	Down Three Dark Streets	Connie Anderson	
1954	Sabrina	Elizabeth Tyson	
1954	Cry Vengeance	Peggy Harding	
1955	Wyoming Renegades	Nancy Warren	
1955	Francis in the Navy	Betsy Donevan	
1955	Kiss of Fire	Felicia	
1955	Paris Follies of 1956	Ruth Harmon	
1956	Red Sundown	Caroline Murphy	
1956	Showdown at Abilene	Peggy Bigelow	
1957	Kelly and Me	Lucy Castle	
1957	Battle Hymn	Mary Hess	
1957	Mister Cory	Abby Vollard	
1957	The Delicate Delinquent	Martha Henshaw	
1957	My Man Godfrey	Cornelia Bullock	
1958	Paris Holiday	Ann McCall	
1958	Once Upon a Horse...	Miss Amity Babb	
1958	Houseboat	Carolyn Gibson	
1958	Some Came Running	Gwen French	Nominated - Academy Award for Best Supporting Actress
1959	The Big Fisherman	Herodias	
1959	The Best of Everything	Barbara Lamont	
1960	Ice Palace	Dorothy Wendt Kennedy	
1960	Mistress of the World	Karin Johansson	
1960	Desire in the Dust	Melinda Marquand	
1961	The Right Approach	Anne Perry	
1961	The Last Time I Saw Archie	Peggy Kramer	
1962	A Girl Named Tamiko	Fay Wilson	
1962	The Alfred Hitchcock Hour	Alice Marsden	Season 1 Episode 1: "A Piece of the Action"
1963	The Man from the Diner's Club	Lucy	
1963	Wives and Lovers	Lucinda Ford	
1964	Pyro... The Thing Without a Face	Laura Blanco	
1964	The Carpetbaggers	Jennie Denton	
1964	First Men in the Moon	Kate / Kate Callender	
1964	Bikini Beach	Vivien Clements	
1964	Blood on the Arrow	Nancy Mailer	
1965	The Sons of Katie Elder	Mary Gordon	
1965	Bewitched	Margaret Marshall	Season 1 Episode 18: "The Cat's Meow"
1965	War, Italian Style	Lieutenant Inge Schultze	
1965	The Alfred Hitchcock Hour	Judith 'Judy' Mullett	Season 3 Episode 12: "Crimson Witness"
1966	The Chase	Mary Fuller	
1966	The Night of the Grizzly	Angela Cole	
1966	Cuernavaca en primavera		Segment "El nido de amor"
1966	Picture Mommy Dead	Francene Shelley	
1967	The Happening	Monica	
1967	The House of 1,000 Dolls	Rebecca	
1967	Another's Wife	Ana María	
1967	Some May Live	Kate Meredith	
1967	Catch as Catch Can	Luisa Chiaramonte	
1967	Family Affair	Carol Haven	Season 2 Episode 14: "Star Dust"
1969	Once You Kiss a Stranger	Lee	
1969	Crossplot	Jo Grinling	
1971	The Day of the Wolves	Maggie Anderson	Final film role
