= Andre Marquis =

American counselor educator and psychotherapsit

Andre Marquis (born 1972) is an American counselor educator, psychotherapist, author, and academic known for his work in the unification of psychotherapy and the application of Integral Theory to counseling. He is Professor of Counseling and Human Development at the Warner Graduate School of Education and Human Development, University of Rochester.

== Early life and education ==
Andre Marquis was born in 1972, in Austin, Texas. He earned his Bachelor of Arts degree in Psychology, with a minor in Music, from the University of Texas at Austin in 1994. He continued his studies at Texas State University in San Marcos where he completed a Master of Education in Counseling and Guidance in 1997, and earned his Ph.D. in Counseling and Counselor Education from the University of North Texas in 2002.

== Career ==
Marquis began his academic career as an Assistant Professor at Northeastern State University in Oklahoma, where he taught in the Department of Psychology and Counseling from 2002 to 2005. In 2005, he joined the University of Rochester’s Warner Graduate School of Education and Human Development, where he serves as Professor in the Department of Counseling and Human Development. Marquis has served on editorial and advisory boards of the Journal of Unified Psychotherapy and Clinical Science, Journal of Psychotherapy Integration, and the Journal of Integral Theory and Practice. He has also been invited to the Editorial Board of the Encyclopedia of Theory in Counseling and Psychotherapy and the Advisory Board of the Unified Psychotherapy Project Task Force.

== Research and scholarly works ==
Another major focus of Marquis’s work has been the application of Integral Theory originally developed by philosopher Ken Wilber to counseling and psychotherapy. He developed the Integral Intake assessment instrument, a clinical tool for idiographic assessment based on integral metatheory, and published the book The Integral Intake.

Marquis co-authored a 2008 article with Ken Wilber in the Journal of Psychotherapy Integration.

Marquis is the author or co-author of books, including Integral Psychotherapy: A Unifying Approach (Routledge, 2018), Understanding Psychopathology: An Integral Exploration (Pearson, 2014, with R. E. Ingersoll), and The Integral Intake (Routledge, 2008).
