= The Day of the Wolves =

1971 film

Day of the Wolves
- European poster
- Directed by: Ferde Grofe Jr.
- Written by: Ferde Grofe Jr.
- Produced by: Ferde Grofe Jr.
- Starring: Richard Egan; Martha Hyer; Jan Murray; Rick Jason; Frankie Randall; Smokey Roberds; Andre Marquis; Zaldy Zshornack; Henry Capps
- Cinematography: Ric Waite
- Edited by: Tony Di Marco
- Music by: Sean Bonniwell
- Distributed by: Gold Key Entertainment
- Release date: November 1971
- Running time: 92 minutes
- Country: United States
- Language: English
- Budget: $187,000

The Day of the Wolves is a 1971 heist movie starring Richard Egan and directed, written and produced by Ferde Grofe Jr., the son of the renowned composer, Ferde Grofé, who had previously worked in the Philippine film industry. It was the first movie to be made on location in the new town of Lake Havasu City, Arizona. This was the last feature film made by actress Martha Hyer and was also the last film made by actor Percy Helton who died about five months after filming wrapped (Helton's last released film was Legend of the Northwest, released in 1978 but made in the 1960s and shelved for a decade).

== Synopsis ==
Pete Anderson is chief of police of a small western town, Wellerton. Anderson has a run-in with the son of a council official, who gets him fired. His warnings that the town is vulnerable to a criminal takeover were considered scaremongering.

Meanwhile, a group of thieves is being anonymously summoned to a ghost town in the desert by a criminal mastermind. Each is promised a minimum of $50,000 for participating in a heist; they must wear a beard to disguise their appearance; and, are blindfolded during the journey, so as not to be aware of the location of the site. The thieves are assigned a number from one to seven (#1 being the mastermind). They are also asked to wear gloves for the duration of the exploit and must not reveal any personal information about themselves, so as not to provide evidence that could lead back to them.

They are shown a map of Wellerton and told that they will fleece the entire town. The criminals are issued black jumpsuits and submachine guns and use the ghost town to train for the heist. Members of the team will destroy a bridge connecting the town to the main highway, destroy the telephone communications of the town and capture all the police officers.

After Anderson is fired, he hands over the running of Wellerton's police department to his deputy, and seeks the comfort of his wife Maggie and young son Will. He is considering having the family leave town, and create a new life for themselves elsewhere. Maggie has reservations about this course of action.

The "wolves" fly to the outskirts of Wellerton, where they overcome a farmer and his wife. They proceed to blow up the bridge that provides access to Wellerton, then cut phone and power to the town. They surprise the new interim police chief and his deputies, locking them in the town jail.

Maggie Anderson tips off Pete that the town is being invaded by criminals. To Maggie's dismay, he drives into town and starts a running gun fight with the wolves, killing wolf #2 and #3, also injuring wolf #4. Anderson is superficially wounded in the fight.

Wolves #1, #5, #6 and #7 escape prematurely back to their plane, with only around half of the loot that they had intended to steal. They take off and parachute to separate locations, shave off their beards and change their clothes, burying the old clothes and parachute. Wolf #6 is shown buying a Greyhound ticket, and heading off into the night.

Back in Wellerton, the region's sheriff arrives to collect wolf #4 for interrogation. Meanwhile, the mayor offers Pete Anderson his old job back, whilst admitting that his dismissal was a big mistake on the part of the council. Anderson refuses the offer, to the dismay of the mayor and fellow councilors present.

In the hospital, injured wolf #4 is promised the prosecution will "go easy" on him by the sheriff and a detective in exchange for telling all the information he knows about the mastermind and accomplices; but all he is able to tell them is that they had numbers and beards. On the TV, a children's show plays in the background, with a clown amusing the kids. Wolf #4 recognizes the voice of the clown as that of wolf #1. The clown tells the children the story of Ali Baba and the Forty Thieves as an allegory of the heist they just pulled off. Wolf #4 starts laughing uncontrollably as the bemused sheriff and detective look on.

== Cast ==
- Richard Egan as Pete Anderson
- Martha Hyer as Mrs. Maggie Anderson
- Jan Murray as Wolf #1
- Frankie Randall as Wolf #2
- Andre Marquis as Wolf #3
- Rick Jason as Wolf #4
- Zaldy Zshornack as Wolf #5
- Henry Capps as Wolf #6
- Smokey Roberds as Wolf #7
- Sean McClory as The Sheriff
- John Braatz as Deputy Sheriff
- Mel Scarborough as Deputy Sheriff
- John Lupton as Hank
- Jack Bailey as Mayor
- Biff Elliot as Inspector
- Percy Helton as Farmer
- Elizabeth Thomas as Farmer's Wife
- Steve Manone as Will Anderson
- Herb Vigran as Frank
- John Dennis as Angry Councilman
- John Gunn as Announcer
- Len Travis as Johnny
- Wendy Alvord as Johnny's Girlfriend
- Danny Rees as Juggler
- Floyd Hamilton as chauffeur/pilot

== Background ==
The Day of the Wolves screenplay was written around 1969 by Ferde Grofe, Jr. but shelved at that time because of lack of production funding. In late 1970, the McCulloch Corporation was actively promoting Lake Havasu, and especially the old London Bridge, which was being reassembled in Lake Havasu at enormous expense and effort. To this end, the McCulloch Corporation flew film producers to Lake Havasu to offer production film support, which Grofe took advantage of.

== Production ==
Production preparation began in January 1971 with notices placed in the Havasu Herald newspaper announcing the production and auditions. Grofe and production manager Peter MacGregor Scott visited Lake Havasu to audition locals for roles in the movie and also scout locations with the assistance of Lake Havasu Theater Guild president Floyd Hamilton. Havasu High School student Steve Manone auditioned and was chosen for the role of the Police Chief's son.

Production began mid February 1971. The first weekend's filming was at the deserted, now historic sites, of the Swansea mining town and at Planet Ranch (see below), with all the actors cast as "wolves" present.

Richard Egan and Martha Hyer arrived in the second week of production. Egan, whose career by then was on the wane, had been persuaded to take the role on a deferred compensation basis by a personal plea from Grofe. Jan Murray and Rick Jason played the roles of Wolf #1 and Wolf #4. Jan Murray was famous as a comedian and TV show celebrity, Rick Jason as the star of the popular television show Combat!. Jason, impressed with Grofe's ability to produce a film on a relatively tiny budget, would later use most of the same crew to film his own directorial debut Deja Vu in Hong Kong.

Frank Sinatra's protege Frankie Randall was working with Jan Murray in Las Vegas prior to production and Murray suggested he take a role in the film. Martha Hyer, married to Hollywood titan Hal Wallis, was made available by her agent for this production for the relatively small sum of a few thousand dollars. Zaldy Zshornack was included in the cast by an arrangement with Philippines producer Cirio Santiago in a deal which provided Zshornack's services plus ten thousand dollars in return for the Philippine distribution rights of the finished film. Smokey Roberds, Henry Capps, and Andre Marquis had worked with Grofe on his 1968 Chuck Connors action pic The Proud, Damned and Dead.

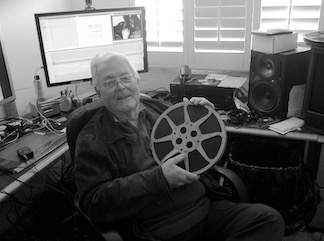
Ferde Grofe Jr holding a 16mm print of the film The Day of the Wolves

== Locations ==
Day of the Wolves was the first film to be made in Lake Havasu City, Arizona. Filming made use of meager town locations, but completely omitted using the semi-completed London Bridge. Interior shots of the wolves hideout were taken at a (then) abandoned apartment construction site, now "Acoma Apartments", at the intersection of Acoma Avenue and Mesquite Avenue. Other scenes used the old airfield on the island area, and several locations on McCulloch Blvd.

The Farmhouse scenes were shot at a former alfalfa farming area, Planet Ranch, and the ghost town scenes at the old Swansea mining town, both located East of Parker, Arizona. The bridge scenes were filmed at the Bill Williams Bridge, located midway between Parker and Lake Havasu City.

Pickup scenes were filmed several months after principal photography wrapped in and around Los Angeles at Marina Del Rey, Santa Monica, Malibu, Burbank Airport and LAX.

== Notable crew members ==
The Day of the Wolves was the first film for most of the film crew; several of those went onto achieve notable success in the Hollywood film industry:

- Peter MacGregor-Scott ... Production Manager
  Incorrectly listed as Assistant Director in the credits, MacGregor-Scott went on to produce many major US films, including the Cheech and Chong movies, The Fugitive, Batman Forever, and, most recently, The Guardian.
- Ric Waite ... Cinematographer
  Emmy award-winning cinematographer who worked on many of the most successful films of the 1970s, 1980s and early 1990s. He collaborated with Walter Hill on several films, including The Long Riders and 48 Hrs.
- Calmar Roberts ... Assistant Cameraman
  Principal cameraman on many major motion pictures, including the Lethal Weapon movies, Jurassic Park, and Basic Instinct.
- Mike Scott ... Grip
  Went on to become Camera Operator on many feature films including Die Hard, Speed, Speed 2, and Thelma & Louise.

== Use of local amateur actors ==
In common with other low budget, regionally made movies, Day of the Wolves used local amateur actors for minor roles in the production working side by side with actors belonging to the Screen Actors Guild (SAG). This was made possible because Arizona is a right to work state.

Local actors were recruited through the Lake Havasu Theater Guild by its president, Floyd Hamilton. Hamilton worked on the film both as a production assistant and on screen in the roles of pilot and chauffeur (he can be seen opening the door of the station wagon for Rick Jason on his arrival at the thieves hideout).

== Music score ==
The score and title song by Sean Bonniwell are frequently cited in reviews as being integral to the appeal of the movie.

The title listing for the score is:

- Theme Song
- Theme Song / Underscore
- Increasing Tension
- Night Time Sneak
- Drum the Drum
- Wolf Jazz / Rock
- Gathering Storm
- Desert Easy
- Spanish Wolves
- Creeping
- Funky Wolves
- Military Drums
- Show Shine Groove
- Cook'n Wolves Theme
- Frantic Rock Suspense
- Up & At'em
- Drums & Sneaky Vibes
- Blues Wolves Theme
- Shuffle Sneak
- Scratch & Hide
- Romantic Theme (sung)
- Carousel
- Carousel Insanity
- Theme Song (credits)

== Reception ==
Day of the Wolves has been generally well-received, although reviews, especially more recent ones, often cite the film's low budget as evidenced by a lack of expected production values (in particular, the prosthetic beards used in the production, see below). TV Guide describes the film as a "Sporadically interesting heist film".

A specially arranged premiere of the film at Lake Havasu's movie theater in 1971 was greeted with a muted response from Havasu locals, who were shocked at the gritty, low budget appearance of the film. More recently, the film has achieved minor cult status with its increasing availability.

== The beards ==
A key plot point of the film is that the thieves are asked to grow beards before arriving at the hideout to help mask their identities. Several cast members wore real beards during the production: Smokey Roberds, Frankie Randall, Andre Marquis and Zaldy Zshornack. Other members of the cast playing villain roles (Rick Jason, Jan Murray, and Henry Capps) wore fake beards. By modern filmmaking standards the stage beards appear unconvincing, especially since it is implied in the film narrative that the thieves have grown them within a matter of days/weeks upon receiving Number One's invitation to join the caper.

== Distribution ==
Day of the Wolves was originally made as a negative pickup deal by Ferde Grofe's Balut production company for the (now defunct) US distribution company Gold Key Entertainment as a TV movie for US consumption. It was also shown theatrically in some parts of Europe and the rest of the world. In the US, it was also widely shown in the early 1970s as an inflight movie. In the UK it was shown as a TV movie. Although frequently shown on US television in the 1970s and early 1980s, it's rarely found on TV now probably due to its hitherto uncertain copyright status that has only recently changed (see below). It was available in the 1980s on VHS tape, but has essentially been unobtainable until unauthorized versions started to become available.

== Copyright status of the film and music score ==
As with many low budget and/or independent films of the period, the Day of the Wolves film was not formally copyrighted through the Library of Congress (LOC) when it was made by either Gold Key Entertainment nor Ferde Grofe Jr. The film clearly displays the copyright logo (©) with date (1971) in the opening credit sequence and is therefore assumed to be covered by the US the statutory minimum copyright protection for a published but unregistered work created before January 1, 1978 of 28 years. The film has been widely assumed to be in the public domain for much of the past decade, though its status has recently changed (see below). It has been openly downloadable from the Internet for several years from a variety of public domain film sites and has been included in the catalogs of public domain film distributors.

The music score for Day of the Wolves was formally copyrighted by Sean Bonniwell with the Library of Congress in 1971. The title/theme song is copyrighted as a separate work, while the score is copyrighted as a collective work. This copyright would have expired 28 years later in 1999 without renewal, except that Public Law 102- 307, enacted on June 26, 1992, amended the 1976 Copyright Act provided for automatic renewal of the term of copyrights secured between January 1, 1964, and December 31, 1977 (these will not show up in online searches unless the author has requested a copy of the renewal). Both the title/theme and score are also registered with BMI for live performance royalties management and SoundExchange to collect royalties for Internet performance rights.

In 2009, Ferde Grofe (as Balut Productions) successfully applied to the US copyright office to register copyright control over the film on the basis of it being a derivative work of a work still under copyright, based on the same Stewart v. Abend supreme court ruling used to bring It's a Wonderful Life back under copyright control. This was granted in July 2009 under copyright registration: RE0000930779. As for the It's a Wonderful Life, this copyright covers the motion picture not including the soundtrack. Copyright for the music score resides with the estate of the late Sean Bonniwell.

Since both the film and the music score of the film are formally copyrighted through the Library of Congress, the film may no longer be considered to be within the public domain (arguably it never was since the music soundtrack was copyrighted since 1971). Accordingly, many publicly available online copies of the film on websites such as archive.com and Google Video have now been taken offline.

== Remastered Soundtrack Release ==
On August 12, 2024 it was announced that a remastered version of the original soundtrack for the film would be released by Uncle Helmet's Music in the fall.

== Documentary ==
In 2007, filmmakers Erika Paul and Greg Quinn completed principal photography on a documentary about the making of the 1971 film. Interviews with film participants took place in Lake Havasu City, AZ, Denver, CO, Fayetteville, AR, Los Angeles, CA. An article in the Fall 2008 edition of MovieMaker Magazine titled "Documenting a Cult Classic" describes Grofe's role in the production of the documentary film.

The film lay shelved for 17 years until premiered in Lake Havasu City as part of London Bridge Days on October 25, 2024. The film is titled When Hollywood Went to Havasu.

== Remake ==
There has apparently been significant interest from a major studio as well as smaller production companies regarding remaking The Day of the Wolves. It is unknown whether a formal deal has been struck to produce a remake.
