= List of Kappa Alpha Society members =

Kappa Alpha Society (ΚΑ), founded in 1825, was the progenitor of the modern fraternity system in North America. As of 2015, there are nine active chapters in the United States and Canada. Over the course of its nearly 200-year history, The Kappa Alpha Society has produced a substantial number of notable members in widely varied fields. Following are some of the society's notable members.

== Academia ==
Name	Chapter	Initiation year	Notability	Ref.
James Phinney Baxter III	Williams College	1913	President of Williams College; winner of the 1947 Pulitzer Prize for History	
Paul A. Chadbourne	Williams College	1846	President of the Massachusetts Agricultural College, the University of Wisconsin, and Williams College	
Charles F. Chandler	Union College	1858	President of New York College of Pharmacy; organizer and first president of the American Chemical Society	
Thomas Frederick Crane	Cornell University	1868	Dean and acting-president of Cornell University	
Amos Dean	Union College	1826	Founding president of the University of Iowa; president and organizer of Albany Law School; organizer of Albany Medical College; manager of Albany Normal School	
Gordon P. Eaton	Wesleyan University (as a local)		Provost and academic vice president of Texas A&M University; president of Iowa State University; director of the United States Geological Survey	
John Hart Hunter	Union College	1825	Founder of Kappa Alpha Society	
Edward Regan	Hobart College	1949	President of Baruch College; president of Jerome Levy Economics Institute	
Laurenus Clark Seelye	Union College	1855	First president of Smith College	
James N. Wood	Williams College	1960	Former president and director of the Art Institute of Chicago	
Leonard Woods	Union College	1826	President, Bowdoin College,	

== Art and architecture ==
- Earl A. Powell III, Williams College, 1963. Currently the director of the National Gallery of Art, in Washington, DC.
- John Kirk Train Varnedoe, Williams College, 1964. Former chief curator of painting and sculpture, Museum of Modern Art, New York City, 1988–2001. Was dubbed "the most powerful man in the modern art world," by Newsweek before his death in 2003.

== Business ==
- Adolph Coors III, Cornell University, 1934. Executive Coors Brewing.
- Joseph Coors, Cornell University, 1936. Executive, Coors Brewing.
- Theodore P. Gilman, Williams College, 1862. From 1898 to 1908 presented the plans that Congress adopted to establish the Federal Reserve Banking System.
- Arthur Labatt, McGill University, 1953. Founder of Trimark Investment Management, former Chancellor of the University of Western Ontario and Officer of the Order of Canada in 1996.
- William "Bill" Scandling, Hobart College, 1946. Founder of the college meal plan, at one time was the king of the food service industry, and founder of Saga Corporation (sold to Marriott Corp., 1986).
- Augustus Schell, Union College, 1830. Railroad magnate and the Chairman of the Democratic National Committee, 1860 and 1872–1876

== Entertainment ==
- Hume Cronyn, McGill University, 1930. Actor. Was nominated for an Academy Award for Best Supporting Actor in 1944.
- Nathan Fillion University of Alberta, 1994 - Saving Private Ryan, Firefly, Serenity, Castle, Lost, Buffy the Vampire Slayer, Two Guys a Girl and a Pizza Place, One Life to Live, Desperate Housewives, Slither, The Rookie.
- Raymond Hart Massey, University of Toronto, 1914. Actor. Was nominated for the Academy Award for Best Actor in 1940.
- Christopher McDonald, Hobart College, 1977. Has acted in over 85 films along with numerous television and theater productions, commonly known for his character "Shooter McGavin" in Happy Gilmore (1996).
- Ronald D. Moore, Cornell University, 1984. Writer and Producer of TV and film, notably Star Trek and the remake of Battlestar Galactica. Two-time winner of Hugo Award for Excellence in Science Fiction.
- Naren Shankar, Cornell University, 1981. Writer/editor/producer for television. Science consultant, Star Trek: Deep Space Nine. Writer/editor, Star Trek: Next Generation. Writer, The Outer Limits and Farscape. Executive producer, CSI. Winner Emmy Award. Nominee for two additional Emmy Awards. Winner, Writers' Guild of Canada Award.

== Law ==
=== Supreme Court ===
- Ward E. Hunt, Union College, 1828. Founder of the New York Republican Party, 1856. Justice of the U.S. Supreme Court, 1872–1882.
- Ian Binnie, McGill University, 1960. Justice of Canadian Supreme Court from 1998 to 2011.

=== State and provincial courts ===
- Francis R. E. Cornell, Union College 1840. Attorney General of Minnesota, 1868–1874. Justice, Supreme Court of Minnesota, 1875–1881.
- George Franklin Danforth, Union College, 1838. Justice, New York Court of Appeals, 1879–1889.
- Hugh Farthing, McGill University, 1909. Justice, Supreme Court of Alberta.
- Frank H. Hiscock, Cornell University, 1871. Justice, New York Supreme Court, 1896–1906. Justice New York Court of Appeals, 1906–1926. Chief Judge of New York, 1916–1926. Chairman of the Board, Cornell University, 1917–1939.
- Levi Hubbell, Union College, 1825. Chief Justice of Wisconsin, 1853–1856.
- Ward E. Hunt, Union College, 1828. Chief Justice, New York Court of Appeals, 1865–1872.
- Charles B. Lawrence, Union College, 1840. Chief Justice of Illinois, 1864–1873.
- Rufus Wheeler Peckham, Union College, 1826. Justice, Supreme Court of New York, 1859–1870. Justice, New York Court of Appeals, 1870–1873.
- Lyman Sanford, Union College, 1831. Adjutant General of New York, judge of Schoharie County, New York.
- Clarence John Shearn, Cornell University, 1886. Justice, New York Appellate Division, 1916–1919. He had been the 1908 nominee of the Independence League for Governor of New York.

=== Attorney General ===
- Gabriel Bouck, Union College, 1846. Attorney General of Wisconsin, 1858–1860.
- Wheeler Hazard Peckham, Union College, 1851. Appointed New York City District Attorney by Governor Grover Cleveland, 1884. Prosecuted New York Mayor Abraham Hall and "Boss" Tweed of Tammany Hall for corruption. Appointed to United States Supreme Court in 1894 by President Grover Cleveland. Not confirmed by U. S. Senate.

== Literature and journalism ==
- Thomas Jefferson Farnham, Union College, 1831. Leader of one of the earliest overland expeditions to explore the American West. His books were influential in opening the Oregon Trail and California.
- Fitz Hugh Ludlow, Union College, 1856. Author who revolutionized the social understanding of addiction, inspiring what it has become today.
- Archibald Rutledge, Union College, 1905. Poet-laureate of South Carolina, author of Home by the River.
- Leland Stowe, Wesleyan University (as a local). Pulitzer Prize for Journalism, 1930. Runner-up for a second Pulitzer in 1940, as war correspondent in World War II.

== Medicine ==
- James Collip, University of Western Ontario, 1948. Discoverer of cortisone and co-discoverer of insulin. Chairman, Canadian Research Council. Shared John Macleod portion of the 1923 Nobel Prize for medicine.
- James R. Tryon, Union College, 1855. Surgeon General of the United States Navy 1893–1899 (retired). See Armed Forces

== Military ==
=== Canada ===
- Douglas Gordon Cunningham, Brigadier General (CAN), Appointed CBE, Recipient of DSO, ED and QC; University of Toronto, 1930.
- Andrew George Latta McNaughton, Lieutenant General (CAN), Recipient of PC, CH, CB, CMG, DSO, CD; McGill University, 1905. Chief of the General Staff, 1929–1935; Minister of National Defence 1944-1945 (resigned); First Canadian Ambassador to the UN, 1950. Wounded at Ypres 1915. Inventor of the "box barrage" artillery firing system, 1918 & the Cathode-ray direction finder (the forerunner to radar), 1926.
- Christopher Vokes, Major General (CAN); McGill University, 1926.

=== United States ===
- Edward Stuyvesant Bragg, Brigadier General (U.S.); Hobart College, 1844. See American Politics and Law: Congress
- Edward Peck Curtis, Williams College, 1914. Major General, U. S. Army Air Force, World War II. Chief of Staff, Strategic Air Force in Europe.
- Hasbrouck Davis, Williams College, 1842. Brigadier General, Union Army.
- Henry Martyn Hoyt, Williams College, 1849. Brigadier General, Union Army.
- Joseph Lovell, Williams, 1841. General, Confederate States Army.
- Ranald S. Mackenzie, Williams College, 1856. Major General, Union Army.
- Albert James Myer, Brigadier General (U.S.); Hobart College, 1845. "Father of Army Signal Corps" and founder of the U.S. Weather Bureau
- Amasa Junius Parker, Union, 1860. Major General, New York National Guard.
- Charles Eskridge Saltzman, Cornell University, 1920. Major General, U. S. Army, World War II. President, West Point Alumni Association. U. S. Assistant and Under Secretary of State.
- Jesse C. Smith, Brigadier General, Union Army.
- John Converse Starkweather, Union, 1846. Brigadier General, Union Army.
- James R. Tryon, Rear Admiral (U.S.); Union College, 1855. Surgeon General of the U. S. Navy. See Medicin

== Politics ==
=== Great Britain ===
==== Member of Parliament ====
- William Traven Aitken, University of Toronto, 1924. MP for Bury St. Edmonds 1950–1964. Died in office.

=== Canada ===
==== Prime minister ====
- William Lyon Mackenzie King, University of Toronto, 1893. Prime Minister of Canada, 1921–1926, 1926–1930, and 1939–1945.

==== Federal Parliament ====
- Ronald George Atkey, University of Western Ontario, 1960. MP for St. Paul's, 1972–1974, 1979–1980. Minister of Employment and Education.
- Loran Ellis Baker, McGill University, 1923. MP for Shelburne-Yarmouth-Clare, 1945–1949.
- Brooke Claxton, McGill University, 1919. MP for St. Lawrence-St. George, 1940–1954. Minister of Health. Minister of National Defense.
- William Herbert Jarvis, University of Western Ontario, 1950. MP for Perth-Wilmot, 1972–1984. National President of Progressive-Conservative Party.
- Denton Massey, University of Toronto, 1919. MP for Toronto-Greenwood, 1935–1946. Officer, Order of the British Empire, 1946.
- Dr. Wilfrid Laurier McDougald, McGill University. 1903. Canadian Senate 1926–1942.
- Walter George Mitchell, McGill University, 1899. MP for St. Antoine, 1921–1924.
- William Pate Mulock, University of Toronto, 1915. MP for York North, 1934–1945. Postmaster General of Canada, 1940–1945.
- David Vaughan Pugh, University of Toronto, 1934. MP for Okanagan Boundary, 1958–1968.
- Robert Douglas George Stanbury, University of Western Ontario, 1949. MP for York-Scarborough, 1965–1977. Minister of National Revenue.
- Michael Holcombe Wilson, University of Toronto, 1955. MP for Etobicoke Centre, 1978–1993. Minister of State for International Trade, 1979–1980; Minister of Finance, 1984–1991; Minister of International Trade, 1991–1993; Minister of Industry, Science & Technology, 1991–1993. He introduced the unpopular Goods and Services Tax in 1990. Chancellor of University of Trinity College, Toronto, 200?-present. Appointed an Officer of the Order of Canada in 2003. Appointed Canada's Ambassador to the United States, March, 2006.

==== Provincial premiers ====
- Donald Ross Getty, University of Western Ontario, 1953. MLA for Strathcona West, 1967–1971; Edmonton West, 1971–1979; Stettler, 1989–1993. Premier of Alberta, 1985–1993. Officer of the Order of Canada, 1998 and recipient of the Alberta Order of Excellence, 1999.

==== Diplomatic corps ====
- Robert R. Fowler, McGill University, 1962. Deputy Minister for National Defense, 1986–1995. Permanent Ambassador to the United Nations, 1995–2000. President of the U. N. Security Council. Ambassador to Italy, 2000–2006.
- William Duncan Herridge, University of Toronto, 1905. Minister Plenipotentiary to the United States, 1931–1935. Mastermind of the Canadian version of the New Deal, 1935.
- Andrew George Latta McNaughton, McGill University, 1905. First Canadian Ambassador to the UN, 1950.
- Michael Holcombe Wilson, University of Toronto, 1955. Ambassador to the United States, March, 2006–2009.
- Humphrey Hume Wrong, University of Toronto, 1911. Permanent Delegate to the League of Nations, 1937–1946. Ambassador to the United States, 1946–1953. Under Secretary of State for External Affairs, 1953–1954.

==== Legislative Assembly (Alberta) ====
- Donald Ross Getty, University of Western Ontario, 1953. See Canadian Politics and Law: Provincial Premiers

=== United States ===
==== Executive Branch ====
- William John Bennett, Williams College, 1962. U. S. Secretary of Education, 1985–1988 and Drug Czar, 1989–1990. Chairman, National Endowment for the Humanities, 1881–1985. Chairman, Republican National Committee.
- Ganson Purcell, Williams College, 1924. Chairman, Security and Exchange Commission, 1942–1946.

==== Congress ====
- Thomas Allen, Union College, 1832. U.S. Representative from Missouri, 2nd District, 1881-1882 Railroad President. Built first railroad west of the Mississippi. (Died in office).
- Leander Babcock, Union College, 1828. U.S. Representative from New York, 23rd District, 1851–1853.
- Charles Lewis Beale, Union College, 1842. U.S. Representative from New York, 12th District, 1859–1861.
- Gabriel Bouck, Union College, 1846. Wisconsin State Attorney General, 1858–1860. U.S. Representative from Wisconsin, 6th District, 1877–1881.
- Edward Stuyvesant Bragg, Hobart College, 1844. Wisconsin State Senator 1868–1869. U.S. Representative from Wisconsin, 1877-1883 (5th District) and 1885-1887 (2nd District); U.S. Ambassador to Mexico, 1889–1902; U.S. Consul General in Havana, 1902–1903; U.S. Consul General in Hong Kong, 1903-1906 (resigned). See Armed Forces
- John M. Carroll, Union College, 1845. U.S. Representative from New York, 18th District, 1871–1873.
- Charles T. Dunwell, Cornell University, 1870. U.S. Representative from New York, 3rd District, 1903-1908 (Died in office).
- Rodney Frelinghuysen, Hobart College, 1969. New Jersey General Assembly, 1983–1994. U.S. Representative from New Jersey, 11th District, 1995–present.
- Lewis Henry, Cornell University, 1905. U.S. Representative from New York, 37th District, 1922–1923.
- Levi Augustus Mackey, Union College, 1835. U.S. Representative from Pennsylvania, 20th District, 1875–1879.
- Jesse O. Norton, Williams College, 1833. U.S. Representative from Illinois, 11th District, 1853–1857, 1863–1865.
- Edward Overton Jr., Princeton, 1854. U.S. Representative from Pennsylvania, 15th District, 1877–1881.
- Charles Edward Pearce, Union College, 1861. U.S. Representative from Missouri, 12th District, 1897–1901.
- Rufus Wheeler Peckham (1809-1873), Union College, 1826. U.S. Representative from New York, 14th District, 1853–1855; Justice of the New York Supreme Court, 1861–1869; Judge of the New York Court of Appeals, 1870-1873 (died in office).
- John B. Steele, Williams College, 1835. U.S. Representative from New York, 1861-65 (11th District 1861–63, 13th District 1863–65).

==== U.S. Senate ====
- James Dixon, Williams College, 1833. U.S. Representative from Connecticut, 1st District, 1845–1849; Connecticut State Senate, 1st District, 1849; U.S. Senator from Connecticut, 1857–1869.
- Preston King, Union College, 1826. U.S. Representative from New York, 18th District, 1843–1847, 1849–1853; U.S. Senator from New York, 1857–1863. Principal organizer of the Republican Party

==== Governors ====
- Herbert James Hagerman, Cornell University, 1890. Second secretary, U.S. Embassy to Russia, 1898–1901; presented the Order of St. Anne (Russia) by the Czar, 1901; Governor of New Mexico Territory, 1906–07.
- Henry Martyn Hoyt, Williams College, 1849. Governor of Pennsylvania, 1879–83.
- Carlton Skinner, Wesleyan University (as a local). First civilian Territorial Governor of Guam, 1949–1953. "The George Washington of Guam."
- Horace White, Cornell University, 1883. Member of the New York State Senate, 1896–1908; Lieutenant Governor of New York, 1909–1910; Governor of New York, 1910–1911.

==== State and territorial politics ====
- Gabriel Bouck, Union College, 1846. Speaker, Wisconsin Assembly.
- William Fessenden Allen, Williams College, 1848. Collector General of Customs, Kingdom of Hawaii, 1864–1883. Privy Council, Kingdom of Hawaii. Member, Advisory Council and Constitutional Convention, Republic of Hawaii.
- Theodore P. Gilman, Williams College, 1862. Comptroller of New York State, 1909. Drafted the original proposal for the legislation that created the Federal Reserve Banking System.
- Nelson K. Hopkins, Union College, 1841. Comptroller of New York, 1871–1875.
- Abraham Lansing, Williams College, 1852. Treasurer of New York, 1874.
- Edward Regan, Hobart College, 1949. Comptroller of New York State, 1978–1993. President, Baruch College, 2000–2004.
- Clark Williams, Williams College, 1888. Superintendent of Banking of New York, 1907–1909. Comptroller of New York, 1909–1911.
- Augustus Schell, Union College, 1830. Leader in Democratic Party politics. Chairman, New York State Democratic Party, 1853–1856. Chairman, Democratic Party National Committee, 1860 and 1872–1876. Collector of the Port of New York, 1857–1861.

== Religion ==
- Bishop Albert Arthur Chambers, Hobart College 1925. Episcopal Bishop of Springfield, Illinois. Organizer of conservative Anglican Church in North America and successor groups.
- Bishop Gary Frederick Woolsey, University of Western Ontario, 1965. Anglican Bishop of Athabasca. National Director, Anglican Fellowship of Prayer.

== Sciences and engineering ==
- Frederick Walker Baldwin, University of Toronto, 1900. As member of Alexander Graham Bell's Aerial Experiment Association made the first public flight in American aviation on March 12, 1908. Director, Graham Bell Labs.
- Charles Brady King, Cornell University, 1887. Designer of the pneumatic hammer. Designer of first automobile in Detroit.
- Andrew Herbert Knoll, Lehigh University, 1970. Harvard University: Ph.D., 1977 and Professor of Natural History, Earth and Planetary Sciences, 1982–2021. Author. Recipient of multiple honorary degrees, awards, and scientific society memberships. Science team member for NASA's Mars rover missions, 2004–2019. Awarded the International Prize for Biology, conferred in Tokyo in the presence of the Emperor and Empress of Japan, 2018. Recipient of the Crafoord Prize in Geosciences for 2022, awarded by the Royal Swedish Academy of Sciences.
- John Alexander Douglas McCurdy, University of Toronto, 1902. Aviator with Alexander Graham Bell's Aerial Experiment Association. Organizer of the Canadian aviation industry. Lieutenant Governor, Nova Scotia.
- Lewis Henry Morgan, Union College, 1839. "Father of the Science of Anthropology" Morgan's theories of historical development were the basis for Marx and Engels (according to Marx and Engels). President, American Association for the Advancement of Science, 1879.

== Sports ==
- Donald Getty, University of Western Ontario, 1953. Canadian Football League, 1955–1960.
- Merle Gulick, Hobart College, 1927. All-American in Football and Lacrosse. College Football Hall of Fame. Chairman, Hobart and William Smith Colleges Board of Trustees, 1950–1961.
- Richard William Duncan Pound, McGill University, 1957. Former Olympic athlete (1960); Gold, Silver and bronze medalist at the 1962 Commonwealth Games; Canadian champion (1958, 1960, 1961 and 1962); Secretary General of the Canadian Olympic Committee, 1968–1976; President of the Canadian Olympic Committee, 1977–1982; International Olympic Committee member (IOC), 1978–present; Vice-president of the IOC, 1987–1991 and 1996–2000; Chairman of the World Anti-Doping Agency (WADA), 1999–present; Chancellor of McGill University, 1999–present; Officer of the Order of Canada, 1992 and Officer of the National Order of Quebec, 1993.
- Dave Sapunjis, University of Western Ontario, 1989. CFL Stampeders, 1990–1997. All-Canadian All-Stars. Most Valuable Canadian in Three Grey Cups.
- Clinton Wyckoff, Cornell University, 1892. All-American in Football, 1895. College Football Hall of Fame.
