= Evelyn Sakash =

Scenic designer

Evelyn Sakash (1954/5 – 2020/1) was a scenic designer who worked on television, film, and Broadway.

She was best known for her art direction on the film Mermaids (1990) and for her production design on 21 episodes of the children’s television series Allegra’s Window.

As a production designer, Sakash worked on several feature films, including The Big Love (1991), Paradise (1991), Made in America (1993), The Big Green (1995), Mrs. Winterbourne (1996), and White Lies (1997). She also contributed to Still Alice (2014) as a scenic artist.

In television, she served as scenic artist in Orange Is the New Black, and as art director for multiple episodes of the daytime series Search for Tomorrow as well as the drama Law & Order: Criminal Intent.

In 2003, Sakash received a Daytime Emmy Award for Outstanding Achievement in Art Direction/Set Direction/Scenic Design for her work on the PBS children’s series Between the Lions.

Sakash was last seen in September 2020 and was reported missing. Her body was discovered in her New York City home on March 30, 2021. The New York Medical Examiner's office (reported E! News) said Sakash had died from atherosclerotic cardiovascular disease.
