= Wyoming Renegades =

1955 film by Fred F. Sears

- Original film poster
- Directed by: Fred F. Sears
- Screenplay by: David Lang
- Story by: David Lang
- Produced by: Wallace MacDonald
- Starring: Philip Carey; Gene Evans; Martha Hyer
- Cinematography: Lester White
- Edited by: Edwyn H. Bryant
- Color process: Technicolor
- Production company: Columbia Pictures
- Distributed by: Columbia Pictures
- Release date: March 27, 1955
- Running time: 72 minutes
- Country: United States
- Language: English

Wyoming Renegades is a 1955 American Western film directed by Fred F. Sears and starring Philip Carey, Gene Evans and Martha Hyer.

== Plot ==
The film opens with the shortest pre-credit sequence that introduces the members of the "Hole in the Wall" gang and silent. One of the members goes inside the house and puts the fire on while the door stays open. Outside the house, the door starts to close, segues into the opening credits.

Brady Sutton (Phil Carey), a former member of the "Hole in the Wall" gang, wants to go straight. He returns to his home town, Broken Bow, and sweetheart Nancy Warren (Martha Hyer), to set up a blacksmith business. At the bank he sees one of the gang casing the joint.

He warns the sheriff that he believes the gang will attempt a robbery that night. The sheriff arranges with the bank to move all the money to the jailhouse, but one of the gang sees them. That night Butch Cassidy (Gene Evans) and the gang raid the jail, but two of them are killed and the raid fails. However, Brady is implicated in the robbery attempt and escapes town with the aid of Charlie Veer (Douglas Kennedy). Veer wants to join up with Cassidy's gang and persuades Brady to take him to Cassidy's hideout, "The Hole in the Wall". Some of the gang want to lynch Brady, but Cassidy agrees to take him back. Veer divulges that the bank is planning to move the money out by train the following night. Cassidy plans to rob the train. Veer turns out to be a Pinkerton agent and goes to the telegraph office at Broken Bow to send a message to the agency to alert the sheriff and put a posse on the train. However, Cassidy is one step ahead and had already got to the telegraph operator, having forced him to send a bogus message. Cassidy then kills the operator. Meanwhile, Brady, having second thoughts about returning to a life of crime, attempts to stop the robbery. Veer admits to Brady that he is a Pinkerton agent and still believes there will be a posse on the train. The robbery goes ahead, but there is neither posse nor money on the train. Cassidy kills Veer and takes Nancy hostage. Brady tries to escape with Nancy, but both are recaptured by Cassidy. Believing the money is still at the bank in Broken Bow, Cassidy plans another raid. But knowing the sheriff will be waiting with a posse, he persuades Nancy to send the sheriff off on the wrong trail, or he will kill Brady. She agrees and the sheriff and his men ride out of town. Cassidy and the gang raid the town, but Nancy has mustered the womenfolk and the robbery fails. Most of the gang are killed and Cassidy is captured. Brady and Nancy are re-united.

== Cast ==
- Philip Carey as Brady Sutton (as Phil Carey)
- Gene Evans as Butch Cassidy
- Martha Hyer as Nancy Warren
- William Bishop as Sundance
- Roy Roberts as Sheriff McVey
- Don Beddoe as Horace Warren
- Douglas Kennedy as Charlie Veer
- Guy Teague as 'Black Jack' Ketchum
