= John Rich (director) =

American film producer and director (1925–2012)

- Born: July 6, 1925; Rockaway Beach, New York, U.S.
- Died: January 29, 2012 (aged 86); Los Angeles, California, U.S.
- Education: University of Michigan
- Occupations: Television/Film director, producer
- Years active: 1951–2009
- Children: 3

John Rich (July 6, 1925 – January 29, 2012) was an American film and television director.

== Early life ==
Rich served as a navigator in United States Army Air Forces during World War II but did not go overseas. He was awarded both the American Campaign Medal and the World War II Victory Medal.

He then studied at the University of Michigan, earning both a B.A. and an M.A. degree in English.

== Career ==
He directed episodes of The Rifleman, Colonel Humphrey Flack, I Married Joan, Gunsmoke, Bonanza, Hogan's Heroes, Something So Right, Gomer Pyle, U.S.M.C., Where's Raymond?, Mister Ed, The Dick Van Dyke Show, All in the Family, The Jeffersons, Maude, Good Times, Barney Miller, Newhart, Benson, The Brady Bunch, Gilligan's Island, and an episode of the anthology series New Comedy Showcase. His feature film credits include Wives and Lovers, Boeing Boeing, The New Interns, Roustabout and Easy Come, Easy Go (the latter two starring Elvis Presley). He also participated in the live telecast of the opening-day ceremonies of Disneyland in 1955.

He won an Emmy for The Dick Van Dyke Show, two Emmys for All in the Family, and two Golden Globes and an N.A.A.C.P. Image Award for All in the Family.

In the 1980s, Rich and Henry Winkler formed a production company called Henry Winkler/John Rich Productions and together they produced MacGyver for Paramount Television.

== Death ==
Rich died on January 29, 2012.
