= Once Upon a Horse... =

1958 film by Hal Kanter

- Theatrical release poster
- Directed by: Hal Kanter
- Screenplay by: Hal Kanter
- Story by: Henry Gregor Felsen
- Produced by: Hal Kanter
- Starring: Dan Rowan; Dick Martin; Martha Hyer; Leif Erickson; Nita Talbot; James Gleason; John McGiver; Paul Anderson
- Cinematography: Arthur Arling
- Edited by: Milton Carruth
- Music by: Frank Skinner
- Production company: Universal Pictures
- Distributed by: Universal Pictures
- Release date: September 1958
- Running time: 85 minutes
- Country: United States
- Language: English

Once Upon a Horse... is a 1958 American Western comedy film written and directed by Hal Kanter. The film stars the comedy team of Dan Rowan and Dick Martin, and features Martha Hyer, Leif Erickson, Nita Talbot, James Gleason, John McGiver, and Olympic gold medalist weightlifter Paul Anderson as the blacksmith. The film was released in September 1958, by Universal-International.

== Plot ==
Out west during the late 1880s, Dan Casey and Doc Logan keep trying to get rich quick and keep getting caught. Needing a quick bankroll, they steal some cattle from a nearby ranch, and go to Empty Cup, Colorado to sell them to a cattle broker. The broker is Miss Amity Babb, a wealthy businesswoman who controls most of the local economy. The cost of feeding the cattle is twice the value of the cattle themselves, so Miss Babb declines to buy. The town's lawmen won't let Dan and Doc abandon the cattle and skip town, so the two hapless drifters keep trying to unload the cattle and move on. All their attempts to elude the lawmen fail. Their next big idea is to rob a bank, so they will have money to ship the cattle out of town. At last they succeed, but now banker Babb can't loan any money for feed and grain because her vault is empty. Dan and Doc then have to sneak the money back into the vault. Finally they steal a train to make their escape, but it runs out of control and wrecks the town. Babb bails Dan and Doc out of their trouble -- at considerable profit to herself -- and the lawman declares that everyone in her saloon should get married.

== Cast ==
- Dan Rowan as Dan Casey
- Dick Martin as Doc Logan
- Martha Hyer as Miss Amity Babb
- Leif Erickson as Granville Dix
- Nita Talbot as Miss Dovey Barnes
- James Gleason as Postmaster
- John McGiver as Mr. Tharp
- David Burns as Bruno de Gruen
- Dick Ryan as Henry Dick Coryell
- Max Baer as Ben
- Buddy Baer as Beulah's Brother
- Steve Pendleton as Milligan
- Sydney Chatton as Engineer
- Sam Hearn as Justice of the Peace
- Ingrid Goude as Beulah
- Rickey Kelman as Small Boy
- Joe Oakie as Fireman
- Tom Keene as himself
- Robert Livingston as himself
- Kermit Maynard as himself
- Bob Steele as himself
- Paul Anderson as Blacksmith
- Tom London as Old-Timer (uncredited)
- Snub Pollard as Barfly next to beer-drinking Doc
- Tom Kennedy as Barfly, seated
- Hank Mann as man with ear trumpet
- Michael Ross as Hotel Clerk
- Grace Stafford as Voice of Hotel Clerk
- Mary Tyler Moore as Saloon Dancer

== Casting ==
Dan Rowan and Dick Martin, later household names with their extremely popular Rowan and Martin's Laugh-In TV series, had formed their partnership in 1951 and became nightclub and television comics. They were friends and protegés of another team, Tommy Noonan and Pete Marshall; whenever Noonan & Marshall couldn't fulfill a nightclub date, they would send Rowan & Martin. Once Upon a Horse, produced in 1958, was Rowan & Martin's first motion picture.

Sam Hearn, playing a justice of the peace, is perhaps better known to radio fans as dialect comedian Schlepperman, heard regularly on the Jack Benny program.

Four cowboy stars of the 1930s -- Tom Keene, Bob Livingston, Kermit Maynard, and Bob Steele -- appear as themselves, as members of the posse pursuing Rowan & Martin.

Three silent-screen comedians have small roles in Once Upon a Horse: Tom Kennedy, Snub Pollard, and Hank Mann. All three were featured in silent slapstick comedies during the 1910s, and they were still working 40 years later.

Future TV star Mary Tyler Moore appears as a member of the chorus line, and can also be seen in a solo dance (with character actor James Gleason looking on approvingly).

Grace Stafford, voice of Universal's cartoon star Woody Woodpecker, lends her speaking voice to Once Upon a Horse, overdubbing the dialogue for tough guy Michael Ross.

As a promotional gimmick, nine disc jockeys appear as extras in a saloon sequence. The Once Upon a Horse theme song, as sung by Rowan & Martin, was released on a 45-rpm single; the B-side was a novelty song called "Bar-Room," credited to Rowan & Martin but actually sung by a male chorus.

== Reception ==
Writer-producer-director Hal Kanter created this offbeat, gag-filled satire of traditional westerns, and critics gave Kanter good marks for effort. Variety commented, "Once Upon a Horse does not have a uniform gait, but it has some funny lines and situations. The Universal presentation is a budget picture and in this class it will be a good bet for better than average. Rowan and Martin, an original and distinctive air comedy team, prove acceptable actors and occasionally get going on some good gags. There is an episodic quality to the film, however, rather like a series of sketches, that does not allow them to build the jokes and situations as they might have with a better knit screenplay. Kanter is one of the few directors to use trick effects these days for comedy and it pays off in laughs." Floyd Stone of Motion Picture Daily gave examples of Kanter's wacky effects: "The steam engine whistle which sounds like a woman screaming. The hefty hotel clerk who speaks in a high falsetto. The drinking by Martin of five quart glasses of beer, to the sound of a working drain pipe. [Kanter] comes up with broad comedy and generally a pleasant neighborhood entertainment."

The film was reissued in 1963, under the title Hot Horse.
