= William Scandling =

American businessman and philanthropist

William F. "Bill" Scandling (June 17, 1922 – August 22, 2005) was an American businessman and philanthropist who was one of the founders of Saga Corporation, a multi-billion dollar food service and restaurant company. Scandling donated money to his alma mater Hobart and William Smith Colleges. He also funded the redevelopment of the Margaret Warner Graduate School of Education and Human Development at the University of Rochester which was renamed to honor his wife in 1993 and total donations to the school amounting to 14 million dollars.

== Biography ==
Scandling grew up in Rochester, New York, and attended several Rochester area high schools, graduating from Brighton High School in 1940. He started work as a salesman for a Men's Clothier spending some time travelling through the midwest. He was called to military service in July 1942 and served in the Pacific theater for the Army Air Forces during World War II. In his military service, he eventually rose to the rank of Technical Sergeant working for the Army Airways Communication System.

At the close of the war Scandling enrolled at Hobart College with financial support from the G.I. Bill and became a member of The Kappa Alpha Society. In 1948 Scandling, along with fellow veteran-classmates Harry W. Anderson and W. P. Laughlin, took over operation of the Hobart dining hall which had been nearing bankruptcy. The following year they started providing dining services for William Smith College. Scandling graduated from Hobart in 1949 with a degree on Economics. He and his partners continued to operate their cafeteria business and incorporated it in the late 1940s. After learning that Geneva was built on an old Native American village called Kanadasaga, it was decided that Saga Corporation would be a fitting name for the new company.

In the summer of 1952, Saga opened operations at their third account at Kalamazoo College. In 1962, Saga's national headquarters opened in Menlo Park, California. In 1968, Saga went public, offering 321,000 shares of common stock. By 1970, Saga was serving meals to hospitals and retirement communities in addition to college cafeterias and was also operating its first two restaurant chains Black Angus and the Velvet Turtle. By 1973 Saga was serving more than 400,000,000 meals a year. Other restaurant chains operated by Saga included Straw Hat Pizza and MacArthur Park. At its height Saga ran food service contracts for more than 400 universities, colleges, hospitals, and retirement homes.

Scandling served as Saga Corporation's president from 1968 to 1978. He said that one of his proudest achievements was in 1984, when Saga was named one of the 100 best companies in America to work for, according to his family.

In 1986, Scandling and his partners sold Saga to Marriott Corporation in a hostile takeover valued at more than $400 million. Despite the sale Scandling had opposed the takeover and wrote about it in a 1994 book The Saga of Saga: the Life and Death of an American Dream. Writing in the Winter 1997 issue of the Pultney Street Survey alumni and alumnae magazine for Hobart and William Smith Colleges Dana Cooke wrote about Saga corporation that "In the 39 years it existed, the company changed the face of college food service nationwide, introducing contracting and service concepts to the industry. It pioneered a staff-empowerment management style decades before such philosophies came into vogue."

Scandling was awarded an honorary degree from Hobart and William Smith Colleges in 1967. In 1998 Saga Corporation founders Scandling, Anderson, and Laughlin were awarded the Medal of Excellence from the Hobart Alumni Association. At that time the Colleges and Marriott had a ceremony to note the legacy of Saga Corporation and the main dining hall in the Scandling Center was formally renamed Saga.

Scandling's first wife Margaret Warner Scandling died in 1990. In 1995, Scandling married Yvette Farquharson-Oliver. The Scandlings had a son named Michael, and resided in Atherton, California. Scandling died August 22, 2005, in Montreal, at the age of 83.

Scandling was a member of many professional societies. He was a member of the Menlo Country Club in Woodside, California, and the Seneca Yacht Club in Geneva, New York. Scandling established the Scandling Family Foundation in 2000.

=== Philanthropy ===
Scandling served on the Board of Trustees for Hobart and William Smith Colleges for 20 years and was the chairman for 11 from 1972 to 1983. In 1984, the Scandling Student Center at Hobart and William Smith Colleges was named to honor Scandling's generous philanthropic commitment to the Colleges. The Colleges' 65 foot research vessel was renamed from HWS Explorer to William F. Scandling in his honor. In 2003, Scandling made the largest gift in the history of Hobart and William Smith Colleges ($15 million). Scandling's gifts to Hobart and William Smith Colleges totaled more than $30 million. In 1997, then President of Hobart and William Smith Colleges Richard H. Hersh was reported by Dana Cooke to have said: "Most colleges like ours have patron saints and guardian angels, who are key to their surviving and thriving. Bishop Hobart, William Smith, a few presidents, and Bill Scandling are in that category for us." in the Winter 1997 issue of the Pultney Street Survey alumni and alumnae magazine.

The Margaret Warner Graduate School of Education and Human Development at the University of Rochester (established 1958) was renamed in 1993 to honor the memory and legacy of his late wife, Margaret Warner Scandling, who had graduated from the University of Rochester in 1944. Mr. Scandling made gifts over the years totaling more than $14 million to the Warner School.

In addition to Hobart and William Smith Colleges, and the University of Rochester, Scandling was a major contributor to Johns Hopkins University where he established The Paul R. McHugh Endowed Chair in Motivated Behaviors in 1998, Deep Springs College where he served on the Board of Trustees for 8 years, the Salk Institute where a $1 million gift funded the William Scandling Developmental Chair for an assistant professor, and Northern Arizona University.

The Scandlings created the Scandling Family Foundation in 2000. Scandling and the foundation also contributed to many community-based organizations and causes such as the Peninsula Habitat for Humanity, the Marine Science Institute in Redwood City, California, the Equestrian Therapy Program at the Stein Education Center main campus of Vista Hill Foundation center in San Diego, as well as the John Hart Hunter Educational Foundation of The Kappa Alpha Society. Scandling also contributed to political fundraising drives such as the Campbell (R) for Senate campaign.

== See also ==
- Kappa Alpha Society Alumni

== Bibliography ==
- (1994) The Saga of Saga: The Life and Death of an American Dream 382 pp.; Vista Linda Press; Mill Valley, CA; ISBN 978-0-9639150-0-9.
