= Wives and Lovers (film) =

1963 film by John Rich

- Directed by: John Rich
- Written by: Edward Anhalt
- Based on: The First Wife (play) by Jay Presson Allen
- Produced by: Hal B. Wallis
- Starring: Janet Leigh; Van Johnson; Shelley Winters; Martha Hyer
- Cinematography: Lucien Ballard
- Edited by: Warren Low
- Music by: Lyn Murray
- Production company: Hal Wallis Productions
- Distributed by: Paramount Pictures
- Release dates: August 28, 1963 (New York); September 25, 1963 (Los Angeles)
- Running time: 104 minutes
- Country: United States
- Language: English

Wives and Lovers is a 1963 comedy film based on the play The First Wife by Jay Presson Allen. Directed by John Rich, it stars Janet Leigh, Van Johnson, Shelley Winters and Martha Hyer. It was nominated for an Academy Award in 1964 for costume design. The song "Wives and Lovers" was released as a tie-in but not used in the film.

== Plot ==
Husband and wife Bill and Bertie Austin and their daughter live in a low-rent apartment. He is a struggling writer, at least until agent Lucinda Ford breaks the news that she has sold his book to a publisher, including the rights to turn it into a Broadway play.

A new house in Connecticut is the first way to celebrate. When Bill is away working on the play, Bertie befriends hard-drinking neighbor Fran Cabrell and her boyfriend Wylie, who plant seeds of suspicion in Bertie's mind that Bill and his beautiful agent might be more than just business partners.

Bertie jealously retaliates by flirting with Gar Aldrich, an actor who will appear in her husband's play. Bill travels to Connecticut for a heart-to-heart talk, finds Gar there and punches him. But when the play is a success, Bill and Bertie decide to give married life one more try.

== Cast ==
- Janet Leigh as Bertie Austin
- Van Johnson as Bill Austin
- Shelley Winters as Fran Cabrell
- Martha Hyer as Lucinda Ford
- Ray Walston as Wylie Dreberg
- Jeremy Slate as Gar Aldrich
- Claire Wilcox as Julie Austin
- Lee Patrick as Mrs. Swanson
- Dick Wessel as Mr. Liberti
- Dave Willock as Dr. Leon Partridge, DDS

== Reception ==
In a contemporary review for The New York Times, critic Bosley Crowther wrote: "It's incredible that a screenplay as hackneyed and witless as this one could get past a first front-office reading in this rigid day and age, and it is pathetic that it should be directed as woodenly as this one has been by John Rich ... It is simply without style or humor, totally flat, and it is laboredly played by Miss Leigh, Miss Hyer, Mr. Johnson, and Shelley Winters and Ray Walston as a couple of drunks—the usual tireless and tedious gag-makers—who are always popping in from next door. Oh, yes—with over-time labor by Jeremy Slate as the Hollywood star. The only difference between this endeavor ... and those of the nineteen-thirties is that the latter were usually better and more—more sophisticated. That's the word I believe they used to use."

Writing in the Los Angeles Times, critic Philip K. Scheuer wrote: "'Wives and Lovers'—title included—might be relegated to the familiar classification of Just Another Sex Comedy, Hollywood Style, but for one rather rare (for Hollywood) distinction. It probes a bit deeper and comes up with a still fundamental, ingrained characteristic of most Americans: Although they may make a great outward show of being 'sophisticated' and morally promiscuous, the Puritan in them usually waggles a warning finger when the sheets are really down."

The British Board of Film Classification gave the film an X rating (over 18s). The Irish Film Censor, which did not then issue age-restricted ratings, passed the film for general viewing with 15 cuts.
