= The Maltese Bippy =

1969 film by Norman Panama

- Directed by: Norman Panama
- Written by: Everett Freeman; Ray Singer
- Starring: Dan Rowan; Dick Martin; Carol Lynley; Julie Newmar; Mildred Natwick
- Cinematography: William H. Daniels
- Edited by: Homer Powell; Ronald Sinclair
- Music by: Nelson Riddle
- Distributed by: Metro-Goldwyn-Mayer
- Release date: June 18, 1969; (New York City)
- Running time: 88 minutes
- Country: United States
- Language: English

The Maltese Bippy is a 1969 comedy horror film, directed by Norman Panama and released by Metro-Goldwyn-Mayer. The film is a vehicle for comedy team Dan Rowan and Dick Martin, who had recently found fame in their television show Rowan & Martin's Laugh-In. "Bippy" is a catchphrase from their show with the full title being a parody of The Maltese Falcon.

In the film, two sexploitation producers are suspects in a murder investigation. One of them considers himself a werewolf, and suspects that his monstrous alter ego performed the murder.

== Plot ==
Business has never been so bad for sexploitation filmmakers Sam Smith and Ernest Gray. After their premises are busted by the authorities for non-payment of rent, the hapless pair become prime suspects in a nearby cemetery murder. The mental pressure of near-destitution and criminal investigation becomes overwhelming for Ernest. So much so, he comes to believe he has mutated into America's first werewolf. He begins to question whether he—or rather, his lycanthropic self—might be the culprit responsible for homicide in the neighborhood graveyard.

== Cast ==
- Dan Rowan as Sam Smith
- Dick Martin as Ernest Gray
- Carol Lynley as Robin Sherwood
- Julie Newmar as Carlotta Ravenswood
- Mildred Natwick as Molly Fletcher
- Fritz Weaver as Mischa Ravenswood
- Robert Reed as Lt. Tim Crane
- David Hurst as Dr. Charles Strauss
- Dana Elcar as Sgt. Kelvaney
- Leon Askin as Axel Kronstadt
- Alan Oppenheimer as Adolph Springer
- Eddra Gale as Helga
- Arthur Batanides as Tony
- Pamela Rodgers as Saundra
- Jennifer Bishop as Joanna Clay
- Maudie Prickett as Mrs. Potter
- Garry Walberg as Harold Fenster
- Carol-Jean Thompson as Mona
- Jerry Mann as Joseph Wesling

== Production ==
At the peak of their popularity with Rowan & Martin's Laugh-In, Dan Rowan and Dick Martin received several film offers, but regularly turned them down as they were too closely tied to the show and largely derivative of it. They finally accepted a three-picture deal with Metro-Goldwyn-Mayer, on the condition that they retained 50% creative control and that the films had no connection whatsoever to the show, including none of its supporting cast appearing in them.

The film was based on a property by producer Everett Freeman, The Incredible Werewolf Murders, which was rewritten by Ray Singer and received uncredited contributions from Stanley Ralph Ross. The role of Robin Sherwood was first offered to Ann-Margret, who turned it down. Elvis Presley wanted to appear in the film and even visited the set several times, but the salary demanded by his manager, Colonel Tom Parker, was deemed excessive by the producers.

Principal photography started in late February 1969; the film was shot and edited in ten weeks, and had a $2.5 million budget. It had several working titles, including The Strange Case of…!#%, Who Killed Cock Robin?, and The Coogle Affair. It was filmed at MGM Studios, on Stage 26, and was shot in continuity, giving the actors considerable freedom to improvise. Two editing teams worked at the same time and at a frantic pace to complete the final cut in time for the planned June release.

== Reception ==
The film was a box-office bomb with less than $1 million gross and was poorly received by critics, finishing in several "Worst Movies of the Year" lists. Following the film's failure, the announced follow-up, The Money Game, was cancelled, and Metro-Goldwyn-Mayer terminated Rowan and Martin's contract.

In The New York Times, film critic Vincent Canby wrote:

[One] problem that I carried to The Maltese Bippy was an inability to distinguish between Rowan and Martin, something that hasn't mattered much on television where their duties are more or less interchangeable... I've now seen The Maltese Bippy, which opened yesterday at the DeMille and Beekman Theaters, and I'm still not sure of their identities, partly because, as actors, they still are television hosts, and partly because they really do look alike. Although one of them has a mustache, they have the same general contours. Television, the great leveler, has produced the ultimate comedy team, a pair of personalities of similar sex, height, weight and wit, which, I suppose, is the direction in which we've been heading ever since Martin and Lewis convinced us that comedy teams need not be physically grotesque—maybe one man should be slightly Italian and one man slightly Jewish, but not grotesque. On the other hand, The Maltese Bippy is a movie that cheapens everything it touches...

Reviewing the film in the present-day for SFGATE, film critic Mick LaSalle wrote:

...[here's] the surprise. Dick Martin could have had a movie career. If he were around today, he might have been a film star along the lines of Owen Wilson. He could do the full range from goofy to serious, without either end of that spectrum making the other seem less real. He also was enormously appealing, just someone you automatically like and want to look at. He was subtle, too, in a way that his partner wasn’t.

== See also ==
- List of American films of 1969
