= James R. Tryon =

James Rufus Tryon
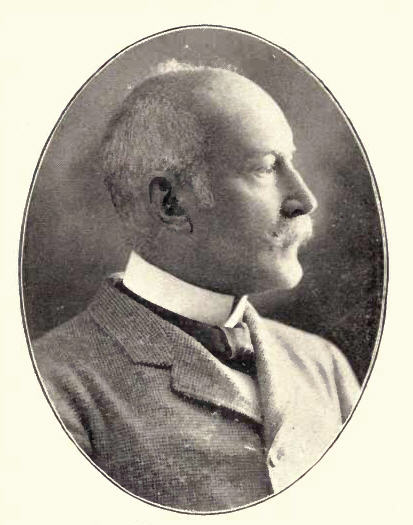
- James Rufus Tryon
- Born: September 24, 1837; Coxsackie, New York
- Died: 20 March 1912 (aged 74); New York City
- Military career
- Allegiance: United States
- Branch: United States Navy
- Service years: 1863–1899
- Rank: Rear Admiral
- Conflicts: American Civil War

James Rufus Tryon (September 24, 1837 – March 20, 1912) was a medical doctor serving in the United States Navy during and after the American Civil War, who went on to become Surgeon General of the United States Navy. His great grandson Lieutenant General Richard T. Tryon was the Commander, United States Marine Corps Forces Command from 2013 until 2015.

== Biography ==
Tryon, born in Coxsackie, New York, attended Union College where he was graduated in 1858 with Phi Beta Kappa honors and membership in Kappa Alpha Society. He then obtained his M. D. degree from the University of Pennsylvania with additional study at the Ecole de Medecin in Paris, France. He was appointed an Acting Assistant Surgeon (Volunteer) on March 17, 1863. After serving briefly at the United States Naval Hospital in New York City, Tryon spent the last two years of the Civil War at Pensacola, Florida, caring for sick and wounded officers and men of the West Gulf Blockading Squadron.

After duty ashore in Boston and Washington, Tryon served in USS Idaho on the Asiatic Squadron from February 4, 1870, to December 9, 1872. Next came an assignment in New York City from 1873 to 1876. Following two years in USS Swatara on the North Atlantic Squadron, he was transferred to USS Vandalia. Next came duty in New York City for two and a half years, and service in USS Alaska on the Pacific Squadron until 1883. He served on board USS Quinnebaug on the European Squadron and off Africa until 1887, when he was assigned to the Medical Examining Board in New York.

Tryon was promoted to Medical Inspector on September 22, 1891, and served in USS Chicago on the North Atlantic Squadron until 1893 when he was promoted to Surgeon General of the United States Navy with the rank of Commodore. The culmination of his career came on 7 September 1893 when Commodore Tryon became Chief of the Bureau of Medicine and Surgery and Surgeon General. He retired on September 24, 1899.

In 1911, Tryon was promoted to the rank of Rear Admiral, retroactive to his date of retirement. Admiral Tryon died on March 20, 1912, at the Naval Hospital in New York City where he had begun his naval career almost half a century before.

== See also ==
- USS Tryon (APH-1)
