= Margaret Warner Graduate School of Education and Human Development =

Graduate school for educators

Coordinates: 43.128596°N 77.630942°W

Warner School of Education and Human Development
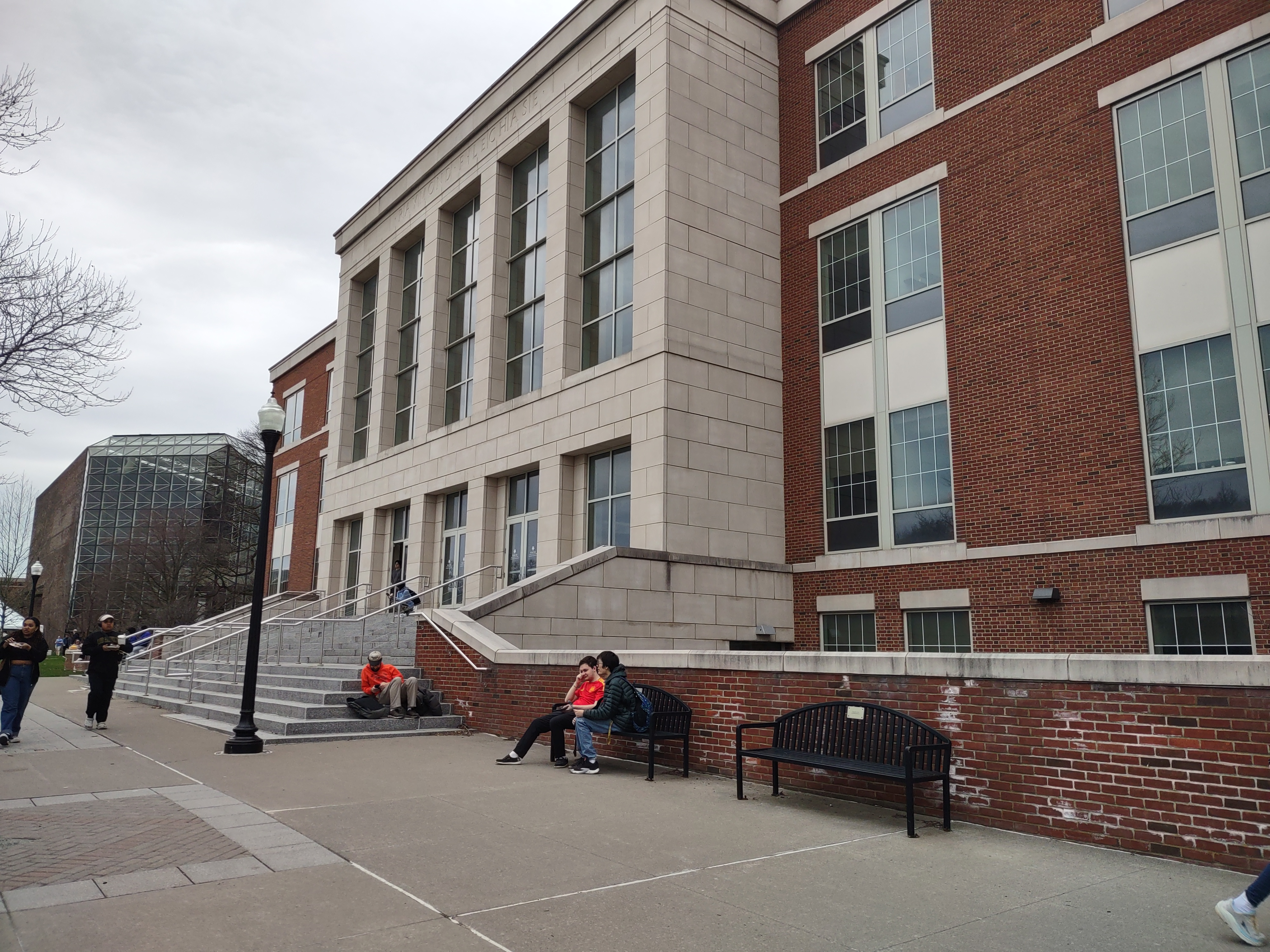
- Raymond F. LeChase Hall (built in 2013), home of the Warner School of Education at the University of Rochester.
- Type: Private
- Established: 1958
- Parent institution: University of Rochester
- Accreditation: National Council for Accreditation of Teacher Education; Council for Accreditation of Counseling and Related Educational Programs
- Dean: Melissa Sturge-Apple
- Location: LeChase Hall, River Campus, Rochester, NY 14627
- Campus: Urban
- Website: www.warner.rochester.edu

The Warner School of Education and Human Development is a graduate school of education that prepares practitioners and scholars in the areas of teacher education, counseling, K-12 school leadership, higher education, human development, and educational policy.

The school is part of the University of Rochester and is located in Rochester, New York.

== Degrees and program areas ==
The Warner School offers various programs in many areas such as master's and doctoral degree programs in teaching and curriculum, counseling, human development, school leadership, higher education, and educational policy.

== Teaching and curriculum ==
The Warner School offers teacher preparation programs leading to New York State certification in early childhood education; elementary education; middle school and secondary education in Mathematics, Science (Earth Science, Biology, Chemistry, Physics), English, Social Studies, Foreign Language (French, Spanish, German and Latin). The Warner School also prepares teachers for certification in literacy, inclusive education, and teaching English to speakers of other languages (TESOL).

== Counseling and human development ==
Programs in counseling include: School Counseling, School & Community Counseling, Clinical Mental Health Counseling, Gerontological Counseling, and the Ph.D. and Ed.D. programs in Counseling and Human Development.

Programs in Human Development include: General Studies, Early Childhood, Developmental Differences, Family Studies, Gerontology, and Research.

== Raymond F. LeChase Hall ==
Construction on Raymond F. LeChase Hall, the new home for the Warner School, began in spring 2011. The four-story, 65,000 sq ft facility was named in memory of Raymond F. LeChase, founder of LeChase Construction Services, LLC, a prominent Rochester construction pioneer and philanthropist. It is notably the first major building constructed in the historic Wilson Quadrangle on River Campus in over 30 years. Designed by Bergmann Associates in collaboration with SHW Group and built by LeChase Construction, the building meets LEED Silver and ADA standards for sustainable and accessible design. The facility officially opened in January 2013, coinciding with the 20th anniversary of the school's naming, and was dedicated in May 2013.

=== Government and Grant Funding ===
The Warner School has been the recipient of several major federal grants in recognition of its work in teacher development, STEM education, and behavioral health. In 2023, the National Science Foundation awarded Warner $3.25 million to establish the Northeast Noyce Professional Learning Network, which supports early-career STEM teachers in high-need districts. In 2025, Warner partnered with the University of Rochester School of Nursing on a $2.4 million grant from the Health Resources and Services Administration (HRSA) for the UNITY initiative, a program to train mental health professionals serving rural and under-resourced youth populations. Over the years, the school’s Center for Professional Development and Education Reform has also attracted more than $17 million in federal and state funding to support STEM outreach, teacher leadership, and program evaluation in schools across New York State.

== Reputation ==
The Warner School of Education and Human Development has gained recognition for the quality of its graduate programs in national rankings. In the 2025 edition of U.S. News & World Report, the Warner School was ranked among the Top 100 graduate education programs in the United States, placing at #100 out of 258 schools. This marked a significant improvement, with the school advancing 36 spots over the past five years. Within New York State, Warner ranked in the top 23% of graduate education colleges, and it was also listed among the Top 100 private graduate education schools nationally.

== Notable Alumni and Faculty ==
- Meredith Rowe
- Alice Holloway Young
- Howard Kirschenbaum
- Margaret Warner Scandling
- Charles M. Achilles
- Susan Seacrest

== Accreditations ==
- National Council for Accreditation of Teacher Education
- Council for Accreditation of Counseling and Related Educational Programs
