= Dan Rowan =

American actor (1922–1987)

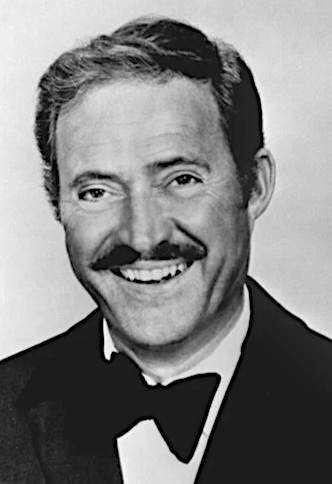
- Rowan in 1975
- Born: Daniel Hale David; July 22, 1922; Beggs, Oklahoma, U.S.
- Died: September 22, 1987 (aged 65); Englewood, Florida, U.S.
- Spouses: Phyllis J. Mathis (m. 1946; div. 1960) Adriana Van Ballegooyen (m. 1963; div. 1971) Joanna Young (m. 1974)
- Children: 3

Comedy career
- Years active: 1952–1982
- Medium: Television, film

Daniel Hale Rowan (July 22, 1922 – September 22, 1987) was an American actor and comedian. He was featured in the television show Rowan & Martin's Laugh-In, in which he played straight man to Dick Martin and won the 1969 Emmy for Outstanding Variety or Musical Series.

== Early life and career ==
Rowan was born on July 22, 1922, on a carnival train near the small town of Beggs, Oklahoma, as Daniel Hale David. He toured with his parents, Oscar and Nellie David, who performed a singing and dancing act with the carnival.

He was orphaned at the age of 11, spent four years at the McClelland Home in Pueblo, Colorado, where he was taken in by a foster family at the age of 16 and enrolled in Central High School. After graduating from high school in 1940, he hitchhiked to Los Angeles and found a job in the mailroom at Paramount Pictures, quickly ingratiating himself with studio head Buddy DeSylva. A year later he became Paramount's youngest staff writer.

=== World War II ===
During World War II, Rowan served as a fighter pilot in the 8th Fighter Squadron, 49th Fighter Group United States Army Air Forces. He flew a Curtiss P-40N Warhawk, AAF Ser. No. 42-104949, currently recorded under civilian registration N537BR, from which he shot down two Japanese aircraft before being downed and seriously wounded in another P-40 over New Guinea. His military decorations include the Distinguished Flying Cross with Oak Leaf Cluster, the Air Medal, and the Purple Heart.

=== Comedy team ===
Dan Rowan and Dick Martin as caricatured for NBC by Sam Berman

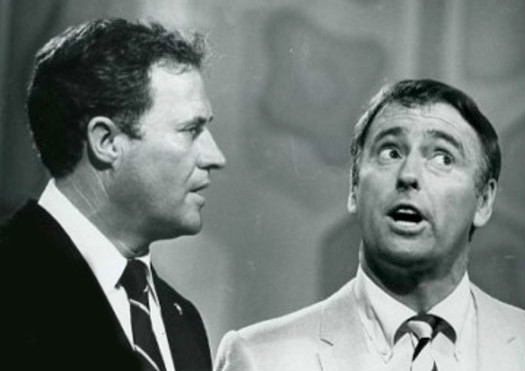
with Dick Martin on Laugh-In (1968)

After his discharge, Rowan returned to California, where he teamed up with Dick Martin and started a comedy nightclub act. Martin was originally the straight man and Rowan the comic, but it did not work—as Rowan recalled, Martin could never remember lines if they were not funny. They switched roles and found steady work in nightclubs. The established team of Tommy Noonan and Peter Marshall was friendly with Rowan and Martin, so much so that whenever Noonan and/or Marshall could not keep a nightclub engagement, they would send Rowan and Martin in their stead; Noonan and Marshall would often write material for Rowan and Martin to use.

In 1958, Rowan and Martin made their movie debut in the offbeat western comedy Once Upon a Horse..., written and directed by Hal Kanter. The team was regarded as promising, but no further offers for movies materialized. The comics returned to nightclubs and television. Later, Rowan was a serious contender to host The Hollywood Squares. However, former mentor Peter Marshall had since become estranged from Rowan and took the job solely to prevent Rowan from getting it, a grudge stemming from when Noonan fell ill and Marshall felt that Rowan had not shown support for Noonan's fight to live (Noonan would eventually die in 1968). Marshall later found out that Rowan never told Martin he was in the running to host.

Rowan and Martin hosted a free-wheeling television comedy revue that aired during the summer of 1967. NBC accepted the Rowan and Martin show, now called Rowan and Martin's Laugh-In, as a midseason replacement series, and it quickly became a national phenomenon, running through 1973.

At the height of the show's popularity, Rowan and Martin starred in the 1969 film The Maltese Bippy, which was a notorious failure. Rowan also appeared twice as an actor on The Love Boat, first in a two-part 1977 episode playing the part of Alan Danver, husband of Barbara Danver, played by Juliet Mills. He appeared again as Matt Heller, a father estranged for 20 years from his ex-wife, Jenny Heller, played by Marion Ross, and his daughter, Beth Heller, played by Eve Plumb in the October 30, 1982 episode "Command Performance".

== Personal life ==
In 1946, Rowan married the 1945 Miss America first-runner-up Phyllis J. Mathis. They had three children: Thomas Patrick, Mary Ann, and Christie Esther. He and Mathis were later divorced. In 1963, Rowan married Australian model Adriana Van Ballegooyen. They divorced eight years later. In 1974, he married model and TV spokeswoman Joanna Young, to whom he remained married until his death.

== Later years and death ==
Rowan retired in the early 1980s and spent the remainder of his years between his residence in Englewood, Florida, and his barge in the canals of France, although he did reunite with Martin for some brief appearances on the NBC 60th Anniversary Show in 1986. In his forties, he was diagnosed with type 1 diabetes, which led to his becoming insulin-dependent. He died of lymphoma on September 22nd, 1987 at his Englewood home. His body was cremated.

In 1986, a book of letters written between himself and author John D. MacDonald was published titled A Friendship: The Letters of Dan Rowan and John D. MacDonald, 1967–1974.

Rowan was portrayed by Jonathan Whittaker in the 1995 HBO movie Sugartime.
