= The Cheap Show =

- Created by: Chris Bearde
- Directed by: Terry Kyne
- Presented by: Dick Martin
- Announcer: Charlie O'Donnell
- Music by: John Phillips
- Country of origin: United States
- No. of episodes: 23+

Production
- Production location: Metromedia Square
- Running time: 22 minutes
- Production company: Payson-Odin Productions

Original release
- Release: September 1978 – September 1979

The Cheap Show is a syndicated game show parody that was broadcast in the United States in 1978 and 1979. It was produced by Chris Bearde and hosted by Dick Martin, joined by hostess Wanda (Janelle Price). The show's announcer was Charlie O'Donnell.

== Gameplay ==
Two couples competed to win cheap junk prizes and save their loved ones from slapstick "torture", which consisted of the show "taking a cheap shot at" them of some sort, with the winning couple having the chance to win real prizes at the end of the show.

=== Main game ===
There were three rounds, each consisting of one question. Two celebrities composed a panel; a seat was reserved for a third, who was always a "no-show" for some mysterious reason. For each round, the panel was asked a question. One celebrity gave the correct answer, while the other gave a bluff.

Each couple was divided, with the female at the contestants' podium, and the male trapped inside "The Punishment Pit". The first answering contestant guessed which celebrity was telling the truth. If she was correct, that couple scored one point and a cheap "prize" (such as an old bee smoker or a burned-out hair dryer), while the other player's loved one was "punished" with a pie in his face, slime or some other sloppy substance. If she was incorrect, her own loved one received his punishment and the opposing couple won the point and the "prize".

In the second round, the other couple was given the guess, and the same procedure was followed.

The first two rounds were worth one point each, while the third round awarded 20. The higher-scoring couple after three rounds won the game, which rendered the first two irrelevant for purposes of determining the final outcome.

=== The Semi-Colossal Prize Sweepstakes Finale ===
A wheel was set up in the studio with twelve numbered spaces, each of which had a hole cut through it and corresponded to a numbered envelope on a wall. The wheel was spun, and a large white rat (referred to on the show as "Oscar the Wonder Rodent") was set at its center while it was in motion. The couple won the prize in the envelope corresponding to the hole Oscar entered.

Unlike the main game, all prizes available in this round were standard game show fare for the time, such as appliances or trips. In addition, before the wheel was spun, they tried to predict which hole Oscar would enter; if their prediction was correct, they won both the prize associated with that hole and the day's grand prize, usually a car.
