= Journal of Psychotherapy Integration =

- Discipline: Psychotherapy
- Language: English
- Edited by: Jennifer L. Callahan

Publication details
- History: 1991–present
- Publisher: American Psychological Association (United States)
- Frequency: Quarterly

Standard abbreviations
- ISO 4: J. Psychother. Integr.

Indexing
- ISSN: 1053-0479 (print); 1573-3696 (web)
- LCCN: 91642184
- OCLC no.: 795965537

Links
- Journal homepage; Online access

The Journal of Psychotherapy Integration is a peer-reviewed academic journal published by the American Psychological Association on behalf of the Society for the Exploration of Psychotherapy Integration. It was established in 1991 and covers research in psychotherapy. The editor-in-chief is Jennifer Callahan (University of North Texas).

== Abstracting and indexing ==
The journal is abstracted and indexed in:

- CINAHL
- Embase
- Emerging Sources Citation Index
- ProQuest databases
- PsycINFO
- Scopus
