= Dick Martin =

American comedian (1922–2008)

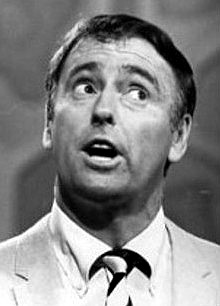
- Martin on Rowan & Martin's Laugh-In, 1968
- Born: Thomas Richard Martin; January 30, 1922; Battle Creek, Michigan, U.S.
- Died: May 24, 2008 (aged 86); Santa Monica, California, U.S.
- Spouses: Peggy Connelly (m. 1957, divorced); Dolly Read (m. 1971; div. 1974); (m. 1978)
- Children: 2

Comedy career
- Years active: 1951–2002
- Medium: Television; film; radio

Thomas Richard Martin (January 30, 1922 – May 24, 2008) was an American comedian and director. He was notable for his role as the co-host (and comic foil of Dan Rowan) of the sketch comedy program Rowan & Martin's Laugh-In from 1968 to 1973.

== Early life and career ==
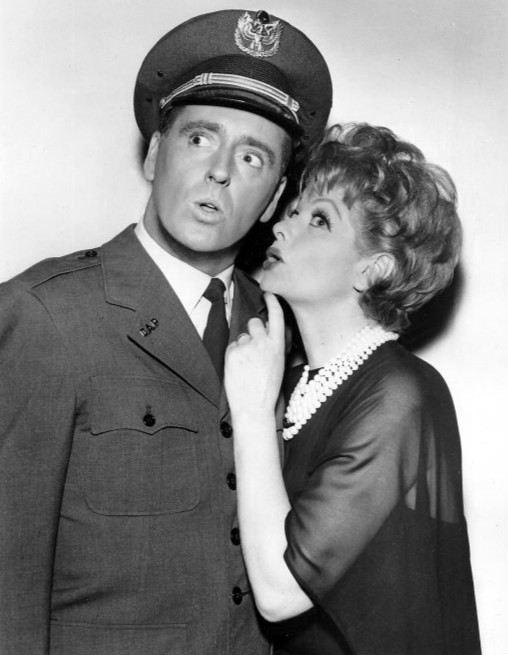
Martin as Harry, Lucy's airline pilot neighbor, on The Lucy Show, 1962

Martin was born in Battle Creek, Michigan, to William, a salesman, and Ethel Martin, a homemaker. In the early 1930s, the family moved to Detroit, where his teenage years included a bout with tuberculosis, which kept him out of the military.

Early in his career, Martin was a staff writer for Duffy's Tavern, a radio situation comedy. He and Dan Rowan formed the comedy team Rowan and Martin in 1952 and played in nightclubs throughout the United States and overseas. Martin played a "drunk" heckling a Shakespearean performer, a mainstay of their act for years. They could frequently be seen as host-performers on NBC's Colgate Comedy Hour, alternating with Dean Martin and Jerry Lewis and other more established names. In 1958, they starred in Hal Kanter's comedy Western Once Upon a Horse..., which was a box office failure. In 1960, they asked NBC to cancel their contract four years early and the network agreed.

In 1962, Martin worked solo, playing the next-door neighbor to Lucille Ball during the first season of her comeback comedy The Lucy Show. He and Rowan returned to the nightclub circuit until 1966, when they were asked to host the summer replacement series for The Dean Martin Show. He co-starred in the 1966 Doris Day movie The Glass Bottom Boat.

== Laugh-In ==
The exposure led to an opportunity for Rowan and Martin to team up with producers Ed Friendly and George Schlatter and create Rowan & Martin's Laugh-In (1968–1973) on NBC. The comedy show was an immediate hit, becoming the number one American television program within two months of its debut. It was the top-rated show in its second and third seasons. Laugh-In had a uniquely fast-paced stream-of-consciousness style of blackout gags, double entendre, topical satire, and catchphrases, much of it delivered by a cast of then-unknowns such as Goldie Hawn, Lily Tomlin, Arte Johnson, and Ruth Buzzi.

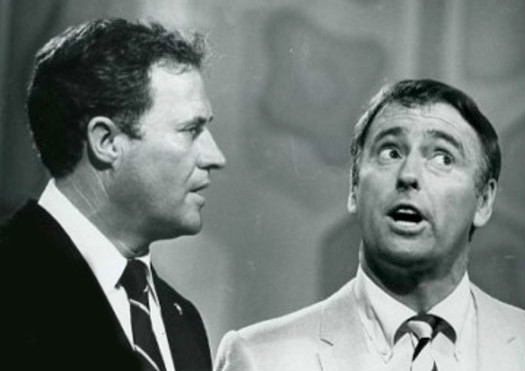
with Dan Rowan on Laugh-In (1968)

At the center of the show were Rowan and Martin. Martin later said, "We designed it so that we are two relatively normal guys wandering through a sea of madness," and described his comic persona as "a kind of inept lech" who could be laughed at as well as laughed with. At the height of the show's popularity, Rowan and Martin starred in the 1969 film The Maltese Bippy. After Rowan retired from show business, Martin was a frequent panelist on game shows such as Match Game, Password Plus, and Tattletales, and he also hosted a parody game show called The Cheap Show in 1978, and the game show Mindreaders in 1979.

== Personal life ==
Martin married singer Peggy Connelly in 1957. They divorced prior to 1968 and he married Playboy Playmate and Beyond the Valley of the Dolls star Dolly Read in 1971. Martin and Read divorced in June 1974, but remarried in 1978 and remained married until his death.

Richard Martin, his son from a non-marital relationship with Canadian dancer Doreen Laverick prior to his marriage to Connelly, grew up in Canada and works as a film and television director.

== Death ==
Martin died on May 24, 2008, of breathing complications in Santa Monica, California. He had lost the use of a lung due to tuberculosis as a teenager and suffered respiratory problems late in life.

Dan Rowan and Dick Martin as caricatured for NBC by Sam Berman

== Filmography ==
| Year | Title | Role | Notes |
|---|---|---|---|
| 1951 | Father's Little Dividend | Baby Stanley's Holder at Christening | Uncredited |
| 1958 | Once Upon a Horse... | Doc Logan | |
| 1962–1963 | The Lucy Show | Harry Conners | 10 episodes |
| 1966 | The Glass Bottom Boat | Zack Molloy | |
| 1968–1973 | Rowan & Martin's Laugh-In | Dick Martin | |
| 1969 | The Maltese Bippy | Ernest Grey | |
| 1975–1979 | Match Game | Dick Martin | 102 episodes |
| 1978 | Zero to Sixty | Arthur Dunking | |
| 1981 | Carbon Copy | Victor Bard | |
| 1982–1990 | Newhart | Director | 33 episodes |
| 1992 | North of Pittsburgh | Irving Kent III | |
| 1992-1993 | ‘’BOB ( American TV Series w Bob Newhart) ’’ | Bob Loudermilk character and Directed episodes | |
| 1993 | Blossom | Frosty the Clown | S4 E9 "38 Special" |
| 1998 | The Nanny | Preston Collier | S5 E16 "The Dinner Party" |
| 1998 | Air Bud: Golden Receiver | Phil Phil | |
| 2001 | Bartleby | The Mayor | (final film role) |
