= List of The Tonight Show Starring Jimmy Fallon episodes (2026) =

- No. of episodes: 141

Release
- Original network: NBC
- Original release: January 5, 2026

Season chronology
- ← Previous; 2025 episodes Next →

This is the list of episodes for The Tonight Show Starring Jimmy Fallon in 2026.

== 2026 ==
=== January ===
No.	Original release date	Guest(s)	Musical/entertainment guest(s)
2234	January 5, 2026	Sadie Sink, Josh Charles	AJR
Donald Trump Interview (using audio clips); Ryan Beckett; Tonight Show Three Simple Steps; Tonight Show Opinion Rings (Sadie Sink); AJR performs "The Big Goodbye"
2235	January 6, 2026	Lucy Liu, Ramón Rodríguez, Jamie Campbell Bower	Colin Quinn
Jamie Campbell Bower encounters Jimmy dressed as Derek Turnbow at the top of the program; the NBA cheerleaders perform a special routine in place of the opening sequence; NYC Billboard Trucks; Politician New Year's Resolutions; Dan the Cameraman; Tonight Show WePost; Tonight Show One Shot Jackpot
2236	January 7, 2026	Chelsea Handler, Sophie Turner, Hudson Williams	Sienna Spiro
Trump Supporter Interview; Jimmy breaks down Trump's schedule; Hudson Williams breaks up Jimmy and Tariq's fight; Steve Rollins; Tonight Show Black Diamond Confessions (Chelsea Handler); Hudson Williams teaches Jimmy how to do a hockey stretch; Sienna Spiro performs "Die on This Hill"
2237	January 8, 2026	Rose Byrne, Maya Hawke	Miguel
President Trump's Notes; Donald Trump Audio; Questlove and Tariq re-enact a scene from The Real Housewives of Salt Lake City; Tonight Show Do Not Play; Reverse Charades (Miguel & Jimmy Fallon Vs. Rose Byrne & Maya Hawke); Jimmy quizzes Rose Byrne on Seinfeld; Maya Hawke assigns yearbook superlatives to Stranger Things cast members; Miguel performs "Angel's Song"
2238	January 12, 2026	Kristen Wiig, Ashton Kutcher; Arden Cho & Ahn Hyo-seop	Ty Myers
Jimmy breaks down Trump's foreign policy (using audio clips); Tonight Show Mimi's Munchies (Captchas); Tonight Show Talking for Each Other (Kristen Wiig); Ashton Kutcher demonstrates Brazilian jiu-jitsu with Jimmy; Ty Myers performs "Thought It Was Love"
2239	January 13, 2026	Ben Affleck & Matt Damon, Grace Van Patten	Madison Beer
The NBA cheerleaders perform a special routine in place of the opening sequence; Tariq corrects Jimmy on misspellings and perform a duet; Netflix Podcasts Promo; Tonight Show Tunnel Fits; 3 Guys from Boston Say Every Town and City In Massachusetts (Ben Affleck & Matt Damon); Tonight Show One Shot Jackpot; Grace Van Patten plays a variation of hot potato with Jimmy; Madison Beer performs "Bad Enough"
2240	January 14, 2026	Laura Dern, Teyana Taylor; Emily Bader & Tom Blyth	Teyana Taylor featuring Lucky Daye
Whole Milk Commercial; Jimmy performs a song about the Chillet; Jimmy and Tariq argue over pickleball; Tonight Show News & Improved; Teyana Taylor featuring Lucky Daye performs "Hard Part"
2241	January 15, 2026	Jason Momoa, Marcello Hernández, Linus Sebastian	Marcello Hernández
Duolingo Trump Edition; Donald Trump Audio; Michael Fitzpatrick; L.A. Football Signs; Wild Guess (Jason Momoa); Linus Sebastian demonstrates technology from CES
2242	January 19, 2026	A$AP Rocky, Dr. Henry Louis Gates, Jr., Walker Scobell	Ontonio Kareem
The NBA cheerleaders perform a special routine in place of the opening sequence; Harry Styles Album Generator; Jimmy performs a hip-hop duet with an audience member about the 2025–26 NFL playoffs; New Year's Resolution Ads; Tariq comments on Jimmy's photos from 2016; Tonight Show Back That Track Up (A$AP Rocky); Dr. Henry Louis Gates, Jr. quizzes Jimmy on celebrity cousins; Jimmy and Walker Scobell engage in a sword fight
2243	January 20, 2026	Will Smith, Jennette McCurdy, Josh Hart	The Lemonheads
The NBA cheerleaders perform a special routine in place of the opening sequence; Jimmy goes through a list of Trump's accomplishments for his second term; Steven Hunter; Tonight Show Drinking Song; Tonight Show One Shot Jackpot (Josh Hart); Jimmy dares Will Smith to hold a boa constrictor for 30 seconds; Jennette McCurdy celebrates her new novel with noiseless confetti cannons; The Lemonheads perform "Roky"
2244	January 21, 2026	Natalie Portman, Charlie Heaton	Your Old Droog and Madlib
Higgins confuses a minor technical issue with Jeffrey Epstein; Emmanuel Macron greets business leaders at the World Economic Forum; Jimmy gives a message to JD Vance on fatherhood using clips of Trump; Jimmy crowd surfs into the audience; Tonight Show We Polled Three Americans; Tonight Show Whisper Challenge (Natalie Portman); Your Old Droog and Madlib perform a medley of songs
2245	January 22, 2026	Anthony Anderson, Louis Tomlinson, Nell Fisher	Louis Tomlinson
What Donald Trump Sees on the Teleprompter; Jimmy and Tariq discuss horror movies; Netflix Rom-Com; Fernando Mendoza crashes the monologue and throws footballs at vinyl records; Thank You Notes; Nell Fisher teaches Jimmy how to dance to "Please Please Please"; Louis Tomlinson performs "Imposter"
2246	January 26, 2026	Pete Davidson, Paris Hilton	Don Toliver
Zohran Mamdani crashes the monologue; Paris Hilton gives a weather update; Airline Messages; Charades (Jimmy & Paris Hilton Vs. Tariq & Pete Davidson); Don Toliver performs a medley of songs
2247	January 27, 2026	Kevin James, Dove Cameron	Tyla
The NBA cheerleaders perform a special routine in place of the opening sequence; Netflix Horny Moms; Moon Hotel Ad; Tonight Show One Shot Jackpot; Kim Coates and Jonathan Roumie briefly appear during Kevin James' interview; Jimmy gives the audience tickets for Solo Mio; Tonight Show 30 Seconds to... (Kevin James); Tyla performs "Chanel"
2248	January 28, 2026	Kendall Jenner, Rob Gronkowski	Holly Humberstone
James Poyser reads cue cards he has never seen before; Super Bowl LX Predictions (Rob Gronkowski crashes the monologue); Tonight Show Flip Shots (Jimmy & Questlove Vs. Kendall Jenner & Rob Gronkowski); Kendall Jenner FaceTimes Tom Brady during the interview; Jimmy challenges Rob Gronkowski to eat as many buffalo wings in 30 seconds; Holly Humberstone performs "To Love Somebody"
2249	January 29, 2026	Liam Neeson, Patrick Dempsey, Reggie Miller	Nick Thune
Senator Quotes; Jimmy breaks down a theory about the Super Bowl LX promo image; Jimmy and Liam Neeson re-enact a scene from The Real Housewives of Salt Lake City; Jimmy acknowledges Patrick Dempsey's 60th birthday; Jimmy and Patrick Dempsey teach Reggie Miller the dance from Can't Buy Me Love

=== February ===
No.	Original release date	Guest(s)	Musical/entertainment guest(s)
2250	February 3, 2026	Keke Palmer, Gabriel Basso	Rachel Williams
The NBA cheerleaders perform a special routine in place of the opening sequence; Detective Hole; Least Popular Children's Cartoons; Short Super Bowl Ads; Tonight Show One Shot Jackpot; Password (Keke Palmer & Jimmy Fallon Vs. Lindsay Hubbard & West Wilson)
2251	February 4, 2026	Ethan Hawke, Katseye, Myles Garrett	Nick Jonas
Mike Johnson Statements; Winter Olympics Promo; The Coworker Whom I Barely Know (Kevin James); Jimmy interviews Ethan Hawke in a set inspired by Sardi's; Katseye demonstrates dance moves from their new commercial (Kevin Miles as Jake from State Farm); Myles Garrett teaches Jimmy the quarterback sack; Nick Jonas performs "Gut Punch"
2252	February 5, 2026	Halle Berry, Dylan O'Brien, Josh Safdie	De La Soul
Dirk and Sammy; F1 Sequel Teaser; Tonight Show Superlatives; Halle Berry announces her engagement; Tonight Show Reverse Staring Contest (Halle Berry); Josh Safdie interviews Jimmy; De La Soul featuring Gina Loring performs "Different World"
2253	February 6, 2026	Chris Hemsworth, MrBeast	Lil Uzi Vert
The Westminster Thrust Ensemble performs "Bugler's Dream" at the top of the program; Unofficial Winter Olympics Logos; Super Bowl Excuse Generator; Now That's What I Call Just the Most Famous 2 Seconds of a Song (Nick Jonas); Box of Lies (MrBeast and Drew Barrymore); Lil Uzi Vert featuring the Jabbawockeez performs "What You Saying"
2254	February 23, 2026	Tracy Morgan, Neve Campbell	Twice
Jack Daniel's Commercials; Olympic Player Statements; Tonight Show One Answer Only; MmHmm! with Rick Tucker (Tracy Morgan); Twice performs "Strategy"
2255	February 24, 2026	Courteney Cox, Jeff Probst	James Blake
Jimmy shares his opinion on applause breaks; The Bachelorette Contestant Statements; Tonight Show Sponsors; Jeff Probst performs a live rendition of his single "Survivor 50 Come and Get It"; Pictionary (Cirie Fields & Jimmy Fallon Vs. Ozzy Lusth & Charlie Davis); James Blake performs "I Had a Dream She Took My Hand"
2256	February 25, 2026	Morgan Freeman, Mike White, Jackson White	Carter Faith
2257	February 26, 2026	Priyanka Chopra Jonas, Bobby Cannavale	KC Shornima

=== March ===
No.	Original release date	Guest(s)	Musical/entertainment guest(s)
2258	March 2, 2026	Nicole Kidman, Luke Thompson; Jack Hughes, Quinn Hughes & Hilary Knight, Mario Carbone	N/A
2259	March 3, 2026	Michael Strahan, Luke Grimes, Rob Rausch	Fcukers
2260	March 4, 2026	Jamie Lee Curtis, Sam Heughan, Andrew Jarecki	Megan Moroney
2261	March 5, 2026	Ryan Gosling, Jessie Buckley, The Cast of One Piece	.idk. featuring Black Thought & Kaytranada
2262	March 9, 2026	Kit Harington, Hilary Duff	Hilary Duff
2263	March 10, 2026	Viola Davis; Gabriel "Fluffy" Iglesias & Jo Koy	Bleachers
2264	March 11, 2026	Uma Thurman, Emma Chamberlain	Derrick Stroup
2265	March 12, 2026	Sting, Minnie Driver, Ruthie Rogers	Sting & Shaggy
2266	March 16, 2026	Demi Lovato, Sarah Michelle Gellar, Daniel Arsham	Demi Lovato
2267	March 17, 2026	Tom Brady, Linda Cardellini, Derrick White	Katie Boyle
2268	March 18, 2026	Kerry Washington, Riz Ahmed	Julia Cumming
2269	March 19, 2026	Johnny Knoxville, Dwyane Wade	Jill Scott
2270	March 23, 2026	Taraji P. Henson & Cedric the Entertainer, Flea, Camila Morrone	Flea
2271	March 24, 2026	Cardi B, Alix Earle, Tyrese Maxey	Snail Mail
2272	March 25, 2026	BTS	BTS
2273	March 26, 2026	Chris Pratt & Charlie Day, Ariana DeBose, Roman Reigns	BTS
2274	March 30, 2026	Jon Hamm, Jack Quaid	The Bengsons
2275	March 31, 2026	Cameron Diaz, Dan Levy	Tems

=== April ===
No.	Original release date	Guest(s)	Musical/entertainment guest(s)
2276	April 1, 2026	Zendaya & Robert Pattinson, Regé-Jean Page	600 Ent. featuring BigXthaPlug, Ro$ama, Yung Hood, & PB
2277	April 2, 2026	Jack Black, Olivia Munn, Jaafar Jackson	MODI
2278	April 20, 2026	Quinta Brunson, Darren Criss, Taylor Dearden	Thundercat
Trump finishes Bible verses with Jimmy; Donald Trump Audio; Jeff and Steph; Tonight Show Sponsors; Thundercat performs "Walking on the Moon"
2279	April 21, 2026	Nikki Glaser, Jesse Tyler Ferguson, Ella Stiller	Isabel Hagen
Jimmy's monologue gets interrupted by CNN News Updates; Donald Trump Mispronunciations; Barry Jones; Red Lobster Commercial; Tonight Show News & Improved
2280	April 22, 2026	Charlize Theron, Donnie Wahlberg, Morgan Neville	Ashley McBryde
Melania Trump Birthday Message; Congressman/woman Quotes; Star Wars Menu Commercials; What's Behind Me? (Charlize Theron); Ashley McBryde performs "What If We Don't"
2281	April 23, 2026	Kate Hudson, Noah Kahan, Christian Hubicki	Red Richardson
Marijuana Side Effects; "Whoop! (There It Is)"; Thank You Notes; Tonight Show Sound Effect Charades (Kate Hudson)
2282	April 27, 2026	Stanley Tucci, Brenda Song, Diljit Dosanjh	Diljit Dosanjh
Donald Trump Audio; Mack Carroll; American Airlines Merger Video; Jimmy acknowledges his guest appearance on Saturday Night Live UK; Tonight Show Three Simple Steps; Diljit Dosanjh teaches Jimmy one of his dance moves; Diljit Dosanjh performs "Morni"
2283	April 28, 2026	Emily Blunt, Chet Hanks	Francesco De Carlo
Lawmaker Quotes; Tonight Show Word on the Seats; Tonight Show Whisper Challenge (Emily Blunt)
2284	April 29, 2026	Anne Hathaway, Yahya Abdul-Mateen II, Stella McCartney	MEEK
Tariq mixes up The Devil Wears Prada with other titles; Thank You Notes; Anne Hathaway ranks quotes from The Devil Wears Prada; Tonight Show Reverse It Challenge (Anne Hathaway); Stella McCartney and Jimmy gift each other custom "Fallon–bella" handbags; MEEK performs "Fabulous"
2285	April 30, 2026	Olivia Rodrigo, Richard Gadd; Reid Wiseman, Victor Glover, Christina Koch & Jeremy Hansen	Bruce Hornsby
President Trump calls Jimmy; Kentucky Derby Sponsors; Tonight Show Toasts; Puppy Predictors: 2026 Kentucky Derby Edition; Tonight Show Space Mates (Reid Wiseman, Victor Glover, Christina Koch & Jeremy Hansen); Bruce Hornsby and the Noisemakers perform "Indigo Park"

=== May ===
No.	Original release date	Guest(s)	Musical/entertainment guest(s)
2286	May 4, 2026	Lisa Kudrow, Robert Irwin, Stevie Van Zandt	The cast of The Rocky Horror Show
Joseph Mitchell; Donald Trump Acronyms; Jimmy discusses attending his first Formula One race; Tonight Show Who Said It?; Robert Irwin practices ballroom dancing with Jimmy; the cast of The Rocky Horror Show performs "Sweet Transvestite"
2287	May 5, 2026	Justin Hartley, Walt Frazier	Maddy Kelly
Jimmy breaks down the 2026 Iran war (using audio clips); Oragon Von Mallamoothe; Tonight Show Repeat After Me; Jimmy discusses a prank pulled by Josh Hart; Tonight Show Four Shot Jackpot; Assisted Interview (Justin Hartley)
2288	May 6, 2026	Brendan Fraser, Kate Mara, Mick Jagger	Trueno
Donald Trump Audio; Kalshi Cringe Adult; an audience member steals Jimmy's voice; Tonight Show #hashtags: #MomQuotes; Jacob's Patience (Mick Jagger); Trueno performs "Turrazo"
2289	May 7, 2026	Ronnie Wood, Molly Gordon, Daniel Dae Kim	Kim Petras
Mother's Day Cards; Dr. Will Brainard; Jimmy Races from the Miami Grand Prix to the Kentucky Derby (in partnership with Ford); Jimmy and Ronnie Wood jam out on harmonicas; Daniel Dae Kim shows Jimmy how to make a soju bomb; Kim Petras performs "Jeep"
2290	May 12, 2026	Sigourney Weaver, Andrew Rannells	The Black Keys
2291	May 13, 2026	Jim Parsons, Chace Crawford, Livvy Dunne	Vincent Mason
2292	May 14, 2026	Colin Jost, Sienna Miller	Nas & AZ
2293	May 18, 2026	Nate Bargatze, Chase Infiniti, Ryan Garcia	The Lost Boys
2294	May 19, 2026	John Travolta, Ana Gasteyer	Slayyyter
2295	May 20, 2026	Sacha Baron Cohen, Questlove, Sue Bird	Dan Mintz
2296	May 22, 2026	Robert De Niro & Jane Rosenthal, Maluma; Ella Bright & Belmont Cameli	Maluma

=== June ===
No.	Original release date	Guest(s)	Musical/entertainment guest(s)
2297	June 1, 2026	Tina Fey, Marlon Wayans, Jazz Chisholm Jr.	Schmigadoon!
2298	June 2, 2026	Paul Rudd, Lord Andrew Lloyd Webber, Nicholas Galitzine	Ron Taylor
2299	June 3, 2026	Nick Jonas, Amy Sedaris	Violet Grohl
2300	June 4, 2026	John Lithgow, Regina Hall, Kane Parsons	Malcolm Todd
2301	June 8, 2026	Amy Adams, Eve Hewson, Luis Omar Tapia	Penn & Teller
2302	June 9, 2026	Josh O'Connor, Sarah Pidgeon	Tommy Brennan
2303	June 10, 2026	Hugh Jackman, Niall Horan	Niall Horan
2304	June 11, 2026	Elle Fanning, Shawn Hatosy, Frankie Grande	Anthony Ramos
2305	June 15, 2026	New York Knicks	Wu-Tang Clan
A celebration of the Knicks' NBA Finals win
2306	June 16, 2026	Jesse Eisenberg, Matty Matheson, Conor McGregor	Arlo Parks
2307	June 17, 2026	John Cena, Olivia Cooke, Lexi Minetree	Kim Gordon
2308	June 22, 2026	Reese Witherspoon, Zoey Deutch, Robert Smigel	Cats: The Jellicle Ball
2309	June 23, 2026	Tracee Ellis Ross, Milly Alcock	Ryan Hamilton
2310	June 24, 2026	Lin-Manuel Miranda, Britt Lower	Cody Johnson
2311	June 25, 2026	Millie Bobby Brown, Sam Worthington	Sombr

=== July ===
No.	Original release date	Guest(s)	Musical/entertainment guest(s)
2312	July 13, 2026	Tom Holland, Mary Steenburgen	Sienna Spiro
2313	July 14, 2026	Matt Damon, Anthony Michael Hall	Phoebe Bridgers
2314	July 15, 2026	Zendaya, Chrissy Metz	Phoebe Bridgers
2315	July 16, 2026	Will Ferrell, Lupita Nyong'o, Gracie Abrams	Gracie Abrams
2316	July 20, 2026	Kevin Hart, DJ Khaled	Buju Banton
2317	July 21, 2026	Travis Scott, Drew Brees	Les Misérables
2318	July 22, 2026	Shania Twain, John Leguizamo	Shania Twain
2319	July 23, 2026	Christopher Nolan, Cody Rhodes	Pete Lee
2320	July 27, 2026	Jim Gaffigan, Karlie Kloss	Bebe Rexha
2321	July 28, 2026	Keke Palmer, John Stamos	Lady Miss Jacqueline
2322	July 29, 2026	Sadie Sink, Fabien Frankel	Shaboozey
2323	July 30, 2026	Zoe Saldaña, Drew Starkey	Feid

=== August ===
No.	Original release date	Guest(s)	Musical/entertainment guest(s)
2324	August 3, 2026	Callum Turner, Chance the Rapper, Sunny Sandler	Chance the Rapper
2325	August 4, 2026	Colman Domingo, Monica Barbaro	Zarna Garg
2326	August 5, 2026	Elliot Page, Bobby Flay	The Red Clay Strays
2327	August 6, 2026	Shane Gillis, Betty Gilpin, Role Model	Role Model
2328	August 10, 2026	Kristen Stewart, Dominic Sessa	Ravyn Lenae
2329	August 11, 2026	Dakota Fanning, Curtis "50 Cent" Jackson, Jon Lovitz	Ainsley Bailey
2330	August 12, 2026	Matthew McConaughey, Katseye	Katseye
2331	August 13, 2026	Adam Scott, Sebastian Maniscalco, Ella Rubin	Dogstar
2332	August 17, 2026	Will Forte, Ariana Madix, Mike Tomlin	Dan White
2333	August 18, 2026	Michael Strahan, Chase Stokes	The Stray Cats
2334	August 19, 2026	Fred Armisen, Michelle Monaghan; Rivers Cuomo & Patrick Wilson	Weezer
2335	August 20, 2026	Michelle Pfeiffer, Rhea Seehorn	Dexter and the Moonrocks

=== September ===
No.	Original release date	Guest(s)	Musical/entertainment guest(s)
2336	September 8, 2026	Sandra Bullock, Mike D	Mike D 5D
2337	September 9, 2026	Matthew McConaughey, Alix Earle	Riley Green
2338	September 10, 2026	Nicole Kidman, Domhnall Gleeson	Leon Bridges
2339	September 14, 2026	Salma Hayek Pinault, Becky G, Andrew Huberman	Angine de Poitrine
2340	September 15, 2026	Helen Mirren, Alan Cumming, Jake Shane	Jay Jurden
2341	September 16, 2026	LISA, Benny Blanco, Rachael "Raygun" Gunn	Jungle
2342	September 17, 2026	Tom Cruise, Lili Reinhart	Suki Waterhouse
2343	September 21, 2026	Queen Latifah, Dave Franco	Ethan Simmons-Patterson
2344	September 22, 2026	Conan O'Brien, Brandon Flowers, Lauren Lapkus	Brandon Flowers
2345	September 23, 2026	John Cusack, Cara Delevingne, Daniel Humm	Cara Delevingne
2346	September 24, 2026	Karl-Anthony Towns, Sienna Miller, Stefano Domenicali	Gary Simons
2347	September 27, 2026	Sylvester Stallone, Luke Bryan	Luke Bryan
2348	September 28, 2026	Florence Pugh, Josh Hartnett	Gracie Abrams
2349	September 29, 2026	Hailee Steinfeld, Daniel Kaluuya	Magnus Ferrell
2350	September 30, 2026	Anne Hathaway, Riz Ahmed	Alex Warren

=== October ===
No.	Original release date	Guest(s)	Musical/entertainment guest(s)
2351	October 5, 2026	Chris Rock, Jennifer Hudson	Alabama Shakes
2352	October 6, 2026	John Cena, Emma D'Arcy, Sam Smith	Sam Smith
2353	October 7, 2026	Rosalía, Linda Cardellini, Tate McRae	Emma Willmann
2354	October 8, 2026	Keri Russell, Charlie Heaton, Patti Smith	Westside Cowboy
2355	October 19, 2026	Chris Pratt, Andy Cohen	Joanne McNally
2356	October 20, 2026	Sacha Baron Cohen, KJ Apa, Beck	Beck
2357	October 21, 2026	Uma Thurman, Josh Charles	Queens of the Stone Age
2358	October 22, 2026	Kristen Bell, Joe Manganiello, Adéla	Adéla
2359	October 26, 2026	Billy Crystal, Joe Keery	St. Vincent
2360	October 27, 2026	Parker Posey, Nicholas Galitzine	Julian McCullough
2361	October 28, 2026	Jamie Lee Curtis, Jamie Campbell Bower	Angèle
2362	October 29, 2026	LL Cool J, Mel Robbins, Veronika Slowikowska	Shin Lim

=== November ===
No.	Original release date	Guest(s)	Musical/entertainment guest(s)
2363	November 2, 2026	Sam Rockwell, Niecy Nash-Betts, Eric Ripert	Kurt Vile
2364	November 4, 2026	Tracy Morgan, Carrie Coon, Anthony Vitolo	N/A
2365	November 5, 2026	Ethan Hawke, Jennifer Beals, Anthony Ippolito	Ashe
2366	November 6, 2026	Sarah Paulson, Caitlin Clark	Dinner Party
2367	November 8, 2026	Robert De Niro, Ben Stiller & Ariana Grande	Lil Baby
2368	November 9, 2026	Pete Davidson, Meghann Fahy, Léa Seydoux, "Ask This Old House"	N/A
2369	November 10, 2026	Dustin Hoffman, Skyler Gisondo, Donovan Mitchell	Tinashe
2370	November 11, 2026	Jessica Chastain, Taylor Kinney	Brothers Osborne
2371	November 15, 2026	Jennifer Lopez, Anthony Mackie	Offset
2372	November 16, 2026	Amy Poehler, Tom Blyth, Vanna White	Milo J
2373	November 17, 2026	Michael Che, Malin Akerman, Carter Faith	Zainab Johnson
2374	November 18, 2026	Kieran Culkin, Julia Garner	Anderson .Paak & Cordae
2375	November 24, 2026	Tim Allen, Amanda Seyfried, Amelia Dimoldenberg	Erykah Badu
2376	November 25, 2026	Nate Bargatze, John Stamos	Aaron Weber
2377	November 26, 2026	Justin Timberlake	Justin Timberlake

== Sources ==
- Official website
- Lineups at Interbridge
