= List of The Tonight Show Starring Jimmy Fallon episodes (2024) =

- No. of episodes: 176

Release
- Original network: NBC
- Original release: January 8 – December 19, 2024

Season chronology
- ← Previous; 2023 episodes Next → 2025 episodes

This is the list of episodes for The Tonight Show Starring Jimmy Fallon in 2024.

== 2024 ==
=== January ===
No.	Original release date	Guest(s)	Musical/entertainment guest(s)
1898	January 8, 2024	Seth MacFarlane, Mel B	JID
Alaska Airlines Slogans; New Year's Resolutions; Steve Higgins explains what he did over break; Tonight Show Clickbait; Box of Lies (Seth MacFarlane); Seth MacFarlane does his character voices; JID performed "Surround Sound"
1899	January 9, 2024	Daniel Kaluuya, Josh Hutcherson, Ariana Madix	NewJeans
Donald Trump Statement; staff writer Brooks Allison is interviewed; Burn Book; Tonight Show News & Improved; Freestylin' with The Roots; Daniel Kaluuya demonstrates falling asleep in 30 seconds, NewJeans for the musical guests is the last.
1900	January 10, 2024	Tina Fey, LaKeith Stanfield	Mitchell Tenpenny
Celebrity Defenses; Ben Dalton; Tonight Show Polls; Tonight Show Friendzee (Tina Fey); Mitchell Tenpenny performed "We Got History"
1901	January 11, 2024	Matthew McConaughey, Lily Gladstone	Wyclef Jean featuring Pusha T, Lola Brooke & Capella Grey
Jimmy skips through the boring parts of TikTok videos; Tonight Show Signs; Tonight Show Trivia Night; Tight Pants (Matthew McConaughey); Wyclef Jean featuring Pusha T & Capella Grey performed "Paper Right"
1902	January 12, 2024	Kevin Hart, Dan Levy	Zarna Garg
Tariq is upset about things being recalled; Tonight Show Superlatives; Thank You Notes; Impossible Pictionary (Jimmy Fallon & Tariq Vs. Questlove & Dan Levy)
1903	January 16, 2024	Sofía Vergara, Eddie Izzard, Alaqua Cox	Bush
Voter Quotes; Jimmy recaps Donald Trump's schedule; Tonight Show Ask Alexa; Tonight Show Funny Face Filter Challenge (Sofía Vergara); Bush performed "Glycerine"
1904	January 17, 2024	Jodie Foster, Christopher Briney	Alec Benjamin
Mark Nailed It!; Tonight Show Autofails; Tonight Show True Confessions (Jodie Foster, Tariq); Alec Benjamin performed "I Sent My Therapist to Therapy"
1905	January 18, 2024	Jacob Elordi, Ariana DeBose	BJ the Chicago Kid featuring Chlöe
What's Happened to Trump's Hand?; Court Transcript; Green Day and Jimmy performed on the 50th Street subway station below 30 Rockefeller Plaza; The Tonight Show Audience: Behind the Laughs; BJ the Chicago Kid featuring Chlöe performed "Honey"
1906	January 19, 2024	Natasha Lyonne, Dr. Henry Louis Gates Jr.	Dusty Slay
Congressmen/women Quotes; Poll Bros 2024; Jack Snyder; Funny Traffic Signs; The Roots do shoutouts
1907	January 22, 2024	Dakota Johnson, Chloë Sevigny	Gaby Moreno featuring Oscar Isaac
Ron DeSantis Dropping Out Reactions; Donald Trump Ad; Tonight Show Sponsors; Tonight Show Jinx (Dakota Johnson); Gaby Moreno featuring Oscar Isaac performed "Luna de Xelajú"
1908	January 23, 2024	Kevin James, Sarah Sherman	Eladio Carrión
Jimmy checks in with Kevin James at the top of the program; The Registered Voters of Dixville Notch; Mental Tests; Tariq doesn't care about political endorsements; Tonight Show Popular Mathematics; Kevin James and Jimmy performed a song about Groundhog Day; Eladio Carrión performed "TQMQA"
1909	January 24, 2024	Naomi Watts, Michelle Yeoh	Dustin Ybarra
That Feeling When; Charades (Jimmy Fallon & Naomi Watts Vs. Michelle Yeoh & Tariq)
1910	January 25, 2024	Justin Timberlake, Molly Ringwald	Flo Milli
Tonight Show News Smash; Joe Biden Ad (Jimmy portrays Biden); Say Whaaaat?; Jimmy Fallon, Justin Timberlake & The Roots sing a medley of songs with classroom instruments; Flo Milli performed "Never Lose Me"
1911	January 26, 2024	Ken Jeong, Dwyane Wade	Pete Lee
Las Vegas Odds; Donald Trump Ad; Ben Dalton; Thank You Notes; Phone Booth (Ken Jeong Vs. Dwyane Wade); Dwyane Wade brings Jimmy glasses
1912	January 29, 2024	James Corden, Rob Gronkowski	George Birge
Super Bowl LVIII Ad; Senator Statement; Tonight Show Monday Motivations; Random Object Field Goal (Rob Gronkowski); George Birge performed "Mind on You"
1913	January 30, 2024	Donald Glover & Maya Erskine, Bryce Dallas Howard	Jourdain Fisher
Writer Brooks Allison got a chip implanted in his brain; Tonight Show Go On, Git!; Password (Bryce Dallas Howard & Jimmy Fallon Vs. Donald Glover & Maya Erskine)
1914	January 31, 2024	Arnold Schwarzenegger, Kathryn Newton	The Lemon Twigs
NFL Haircuts; Taylor Swift Vs. Donald Trump; Jimmy recaps the month; Tonight Show Connections; Tonight Show Pup Quiz (Arnold Schwarzenegger); The Lemon Twigs performed "My Golden Years"

=== February ===
No.	Original release date	Guest(s)	Musical/entertainment guest(s)
1915	February 1, 2024	Sam Rockwell, Jack Whitehall	Ariana DeBose & Boy George
Donald Trump Excuses; Jack Snyder; the crew uses each other's streaming passwords; Tonight Show Do Not Play; Ariana DeBose & Boy George performed "Electric Energy"
1916	February 2, 2024	Larry David, Cole Sprouse	Rob Haze
Jimmy checks in with Larry David at the top of the program; Groundhog Vs. Groundhog; Joe Biden Text Message; Steve Higgins mispronounces things; Thank You Notes; Cole Sprouse brings Jimmy a painting
1917	February 5, 2024	Keegan-Michael Key, Boy George, Matt Pittman & Billy Durney	N/A
Can You Name Marianne Williamson or Dean Phillips?; Tonight Show NFL Fashion Show; "Cool Bartenders" Music Video (with Keegan-Michael Key); Tonight Show Battle of the Instant Songwriters; Keegan-Michael Key performs his characters; Tonight Show Super Bowl Grill Master Challenge (Matt Pittman & Billy Durney)
1918	February 6, 2024	Tracee Ellis Ross, Sir Rod Stewart & Jools Holland	Sir Rod Stewart with Jools Holland
Donald Trump Statement; Questlove and Tariq re-enact a scene from The Bachelor; Changed Slogans; Airport Ad; Tonight Show Singing Whisper Challenge (Tracee Ellis Ross); Sir Rod Stewart with Jools Holland performed "Almost Like Being in Love"
1919	February 7, 2024	Carey Mulligan, Alan Cumming	Idles
Tonight Show Polls; Donald Trump Statement; Congressmen Quotes; Spin, Lose, or Draw (Carey Mulligan & Alan Cumming); Idles performed "Gift Horse"
1920	February 8, 2024	Mariska Hargitay, Callum Turner	Emmy Blotnick
Tonight Show Did Ya Know?; Tonight Show Superlatives; Catchphrase (Jimmy Fallon & Mariska Hargitay Vs. Tariq & Callum Turner)
1921	February 9, 2024	Sylvester Stallone, Jalen Brunson	Madi Diaz
Shortened Ads; Mascot Quotes; Joe Biden interview using clips; Jimmy tests Steve Higgins' memory; the crew bets on the Super Bowl; James Poyser reads cue cards he has never seen before; Thank You Notes; Jimmy's Special Request (with Jalen Brunson); Madi Diaz performed "Everything Almost"
1922	February 12, 2024	Michael Cera, Maisie Williams, Steve Kornacki	Sophie Ellis-Bextor
Travis Kelce Yelling; Super Bowl Bingo; Sophie Ellis-Bextor performed "Murder on the Dancefloor"
1923	February 13, 2024	Amy Schumer, J. B. Smoove	Yard Act
Tariq is upset about things being recalled; J. B. Smoove offers to be the show's weather correspondent; Tonight Show News & Improved; Freestylin' with The Roots; Amy Schumer gets backup dancers; Yard Act performed "We Make Hits"
1924	February 14, 2024	Tyler Perry, Hilary Swank, Christina Tosi with Will Guidara	N/A
Valentines Day Commercials; Tom Suozzi Vs. George Santos; Questlove and Tariq re-enact a scene from The Bachelor; Cupid's Arrow; Tonight Show Audience Suggestion Box (edited clips of politicians, audience members compete in a best bass face competition, Jimmy plays a prank on a staff member, Tariq & Adler podcast, Cupid crowd surfs in the audience)
1925	February 15, 2024	Queen Latifah, Margaret Qualley	Brittany Howard
Donald Trump/Stormy Daniels Statements; Jimmy recaps Donald Trump's schedule; Mike Lafonze; Red Lobster Ad; Tonightshocials; Tonight Show Back That Track Up (Queen Latifah); Brittany Howard performed "Prove It to You"
1926	February 16, 2024	Jennifer Lopez, Alan Ritchson	Gary Clark Jr.
Looking Back at President's Day; Company Statements; Tariq raps about Mr. characters; Jimmy portrays Joe Biden on TikTok; Tonight Show Name That Song Challenge: Now and Then Edition (Jennifer Lopez); Gary Clark Jr. performed "Maktub"
1927	February 26, 2024	Austin Butler, Mark Ronson	Kings of Leon
Steve Higgins recounts his week off; Jimmy thanks the crew and audience for the 10th anniversary of the broadcast the past week; Tonight Show Connections; Tonight Show Search Party (Kings of Leon & Tariq Vs. Jimmy Fallon, Mark Ronson, Austin Butler & Chance the Rapper); Kings of Leon performed "Mustang"
1928	February 27, 2024	Sydney Sweeney, Joe Manganiello, Jason Reynolds	Muni Long
Borderline Attraction Ad; Joe Biden Audio (Jimmy portrays Biden); Donald Trump Jr. Statement; Tonight Show Ask Alexa; Muni Long performed "Made for Me"
1929	February 28, 2024	Kate Winslet, Robin Wright	Maya Hawke
Jimmy uses footage of Joe Biden to give him a mock physical; Senator Quotes; Jimmy skips through the boring parts of TikTok videos; Questlove and Tariq re-enact a scene from The Bachelor; Jimmy acknowledges the passing of Richard Lewis; The Tonight Show Audience: A Look Behind the Laughs; Maya Hawke performed "Missing Out"
1930	February 29, 2024	Millie Bobby Brown, Gordon Cormier	Schoolboy Q
Joe Biden Ailments; Supreme Court Justice Statements; C-SPAN Ad; Jimmy recaps the month; Tonight Show The Gif That Keeps on Giffing; Egg Russian Roulette (Millie Bobby Brown); Millie Bobby Brown brings out her dog during the interview; Gordon Cormier does staff work; Schoolboy Q performed "Ohio"

=== March ===
No.	Original release date	Guest(s)	Musical/entertainment guest(s)
1931	March 1, 2024	Dave Bautista, Jesse Tyler Ferguson	Esther Povitsky
Joe Biden Vs. Donald Trump At the Border; Trump HGTV Series; People Quotes; Fast & Furious 2024 Trailer; Jimmy and Tariq rap about Dave Bautista; Thank You Notes; Ew! sketch (Dave Bautista)
1932	March 4, 2024	Julianne Moore, Lindsay Lohan	Joe List
Don: Part Two Trailer; Phil Smith; Tonight Show Monday Motivations; What's Behind Me? (Julianne Moore)
1933	March 5, 2024	Savannah Guthrie & Hoda Kotb, Rhett & Link	Don Toliver
Super Tuesday Song; Billionaire Quotes; Tonight Show Google Autofails; GE Tonight Show Fallonventions: Kid's Inventions; Catchphrase (Savannah Guthrie & Jimmy Fallon Vs. Tariq & Hoda Kotb); Rhett & Link bring food; Don Toliver performed "Bandit"
1934	March 6, 2024	John Cena, Jake Tapper	Norah Jones
Young Sheldon Spin–off; Questlove and Tariq re-enact a scene from Love Is Blind; Tonight Show Trivia Night; Tonight Show Disco Piñata (John Cena); Norah Jones performed "Running"
1935	March 7, 2024	Ricky Martin, Marcello Hernández	Manuel Turizo & Yandel
2024 State of the Union Address Schedule; Donald Trump/Joe Biden Statements; Tonight Show Who Said It?; Sexy Tequila (Ricky Martin); Marcello Hernández brings Jimmy champagne; Manuel Turizo & Yandel performed "Mamasota"
1936	March 8, 2024	Naomi Campbell, Sue Bird	Kneecap
Regular Joe Vs. Fired Up Joe; Things Never Before Said at the State of the Union; Jimmy promotes Ford Motor Company adapters; Thank You Notes; Naomi Campbell teaches Jimmy to tap dance; Kneecap performed "Sick in the Head"
1937	March 11, 2024	Ewan McGregor & Mary Elizabeth Winstead, Evan Rachel Wood	Marcus King
Tonight Show Sponsors; Password (Jimmy Fallon & Elmo Vs. Tariq & Cookie Monster); Ewan McGregor, Mary Elizabeth Winstead and Jimmy try on mustaches; Evan Rachel Wood performed "Flowers"; Marcus King performed "Delilah"
1938	March 12, 2024	Kelly Clarkson, Peyton Manning & Mike Tirico, Carrie Coon	Katherine Blanford
Tariq fills in for Steve Higgins as announcer; Politician Quotes; Donald Trump Statement; Tonight Show Popular Mathematics; Olympictionary (Kelly Clarkson & Jimmy Fallon Vs. Peyton Manning & Mike Tirico)
1939	March 13, 2024	Angela Bassett, Noel Fielding	Mitch Rowland featuring Ben Harper
Tariq fills in for Steve Higgins as announcer; Congressmen Quotes; Zayn Malik makes a surprise appearance; Jimmy announces he is co-hosting the closing ceremony of the 2024 Summer Olympics at the invitation of Mike Tirico; Tonight Show Audience Suggestion Box (college basketball coaches yelling dubbed with aggressive rock music, Angela Bassett makes a surprise appearance); Mitch Rowland featuring Ben Harper performed "All the Way Back"
1940	March 14, 2024	Kacey Musgraves, Deion Sanders	Kacey Musgraves
Tariq fills in for Steve Higgins as announcer; Steven Mnuchin Statement; Questlove and Tariq re-enact a scene from Love Is Blind; Tonight Show News Radio; TonightShocials; Deion Sanders gives mock pump-up statements to sports players; Kacey Musgraves performed "The Architect"
1941	March 15, 2024	Bill Murray & Ernie Hudson, Kimbal Musk	Sleater-Kinney
Tariq fills in for Steve Higgins as announcer; Jimmy reads Irish limericks; BJ's Wholesale Club Ad; Bill Murray makes a surprise appearance during the monologue; Jimmy Fallon, Bill Murray, Ernie Hudson, Ray Parker Jr. & The Roots sing "Ghostbusters" with classroom instruments; Ernie Hudson signs Bill Murray's and Jimmy's legs; Thank You Notes; Sleater-Kinney performed "Untidy Creature"
1942	March 18, 2024	Jake Gyllenhaal, Chris Robinson	The Black Crowes
Tariq fills in for Steve Higgins as announcer; Vladimir Putin Speech; Tonight Show Clickbait; Tonight Show Singing Whisper Challenge (Jake Gyllenhaal); The Black Crowes performed "Wanting and Waiting"
1943	March 19, 2024	Tracy Morgan, Leslie Bibb, José Andrés	Adrianne Lenker
Insurance Company Ads; Bond Vs. Bond; Steve Higgins recounts his time off; Let's Get Siri–ous; The Roots do shoutouts; José Andrés and Jimmy do tequila shots; Adrianne Lenker performed "Free Treasure"
1944	March 20, 2024	Kristen Wiig, Lenny Kravitz	Lenny Kravitz
Tonight Show Fauxtos; Lenny Kravitz appears as Hashtag the Panda; Tonight Show Go On, Git!; Kristen Wiig uses an opera singer to speak on her behalf after losing her voice; Lenny Kravitz performed "Human"
1945	March 21, 2024	Gisele Bündchen, Wayne Brady	Mary Beth Barone
Donald Trump Ad; Fan Signs; Mascot Quotes; Tonight Show True Confessions (Gisele Bündchen, Wayne Brady); Gisele Bündchen teaches Jimmy Portuguese; Wayne Brady freestyles about The Wiz
1946	March 22, 2024	Alicia Keys, Tony Goldwyn, Maleah Joi Moon	The cast of Hell's Kitchen
March Madness Players Combinations; Jimmy performed a song about spring weather; Thank You Notes; The cast of Hell's Kitchen performed "Kaleidoscope"
1947	March 25, 2024	Shakira, Dakota Fanning, Mo Gilligan	Shakira
Shakira takes a lie detector test at the top of the program; Donald Trump's Assets; Dave Nardoon; Jimmy announces the return of Fallon Book Club; Shakira performed "Puntería"
1948	March 26, 2024	Maya Rudolph, Pete Townshend	The cast of The Who's Tommy
Courtroom Sketch Quotes; Tonight Show Lesser Known Candidates; Tonight Show Lip Sync Roulette (Maya Rudolph); The cast of The Who's Tommy performed a medley of songs
1949	March 27, 2024	Jerry Seinfeld, Logan Lerman	Lizzy McAlpine
Barack Obama/Joe Biden Phone Call (Jimmy portrays both); Trump Eclipse Glasses Ad; Random Question, But... (Jerry Seinfeld); trailer debut of Unfrosted; Lizzy McAlpine performed "Older"
1950	March 28, 2024	Zoe Saldaña, Neal Brennan	MAX
White House Children's Book Comparisons; NYC Tolls; "Take Me Out to the Ball Game" Changes; Tonight Show Screengrabs; MAX performed "Stupid in Love"
1951	March 29, 2024	Sarah Paulson, Dev Patel	Jackie Fabulous
Bernie Sanders Quotes; Senator Statements; Matt Maddock Tweets; Jimmy recaps the month; Thank You Notes; Sarah Paulson teaches Jimmy vocal warmups; Tonight Show Face It Challenge (Sarah Paulson)

=== April ===
No.	Original release date	Guest(s)	Musical/entertainment guest(s)
1952	April 1, 2024	Hillary Rodham Clinton, Jonathan Groff	Sasha Alex Sloan
Tonight Show Is There More?; Tariq raps about Godzilla x Kong: The New Empire; Tonight Show Connections; Jonathan Groff and Jimmy type out a piece to auction off for Broadway Cares/Equity Fights AIDS; Tonight Show Jinx Challenge (Jonathan Groff); Sasha Alex Sloan performed "Highlights"
1953	April 2, 2024	Rebel Wilson, Alison Brie, Dr. David Agus	Preacher Lawson
Jimmy recounts an April Fools' Day prank his family pulled on him the day before; Fallon Book Club; Alison Brie performed "Heartbreaker"
1954	April 3, 2024	Dwayne Johnson & Roman Reigns, Emma Roberts	Grupo Frontera
Tonight Show News Smash; Fallon Book Club; Freestylin' with The Roots; Grupo Frontera performed "Ya Pedo Quién Sabe"
1955	April 4, 2024	Dr. Phil McGraw, Alex Edelman	G-Eazy featuring Coi Leray & Kaliii
Bill Belichick Books; Statue Statements; Tonight Show Show Me Something Good; Dr. Phil McGraw teaches Jimmy to dance; Tonight Show Peep Quiz; G-Eazy featuring Coi Leray & Kaliii performed "Femme Fatale"
1956	April 5, 2024	Glen Powell, Christian Slater	Arlo Parks
Emergency Alerts; Jimmy recounts what he was doing during an earthquake; Eclipse Product Ads; Eclipse Educational Video; Thank You Notes; Precinct 62: Lethal Justice (Glen Powell); Arlo Parks performed "Devotion"
1957	April 8, 2024	Jim Parsons, Kaia Gerber	Heart
Heart and Jimmy performed "Total Eclipse of the Heart" during the Solar eclipse of April 8, 2024 at the top of the program; Tonight Show Monday Motivations; Fallon Book Club; Tonight Show Spin Lose or Draw (Tariq & Jim Parsons Vs. Jimmy Fallon & Kaia Gerber); Heart performed "Barracuda"
1958	April 9, 2024	Conan O'Brien, Nicole Richie	Liam Gallagher & John Squire
Biden/Trump Debate Ads; Jimmy recaps Donald Trump's schedule; Fallon Book Club; Liam Gallagher & John Squire performed "I'm a Wheel"
1959	April 10, 2024	Adam Levine, Ella Purnell	Benson Boone
Easier Board Games; Senator TikTok; Garret Finnley; Fallon Book Club; Tonight Show Wheel of Musical Impressions (Adam Levine); Benson Boone performed "Beautiful Things"
1960	April 11, 2024	Ryan Gosling, Johnny Knoxville	Girl in Red
Exclusive interview with a chair; Social Wedia; Tonight Show Putt Putt Masters; Girl in Red performed "Too Much"
1961	April 12, 2024	Jesse Eisenberg, Susie Essman	Nathan Macintosh
Donald Trump's Tax Return; Janet Jackson makes a surprise appearance during the monologue; SOS Signs; That Feeling When; Fallon Book Club; the crew read poems
1962	April 29, 2024	Anne Hathaway, Melanie Lynskey	Lang Lang
Ice-T Breakdown; Garret Finnley; Jimmy announces a partnership with the Ford Derby Day Sweepstakes; Kentucky Derby Hat Week; Reverse Charades (Anne Hathaway & Jimmy Fallon Vs. Tariq & Melanie Lynskey); Lang Lang performed "The Carnival of the Animals"
1963	April 30, 2024	Tiger Woods, Benny Blanco	Todd Barry
Jimmy recaps the month; Kentucky Derby Hat Week; Tonight Show Do Not Read

=== May ===
No.	Original release date	Guest(s)	Musical/entertainment guest(s)
1964	May 1, 2024	Doja Cat, Winston Duke	Doja Cat
Trump Shock Collar Ad; Kentucky Derby Hat Week; Doja Cat brings Jimmy a hair suit from The Scarlet Tour; Tonight Show Musical Genre Challenge (Doja Cat); Winston Duke and Jimmy try on hats; Doja Cat performed "Acknowledge Me"
1965	May 2, 2024	Kate Hudson, Chrissy Teigen & John Legend	Kate Hudson
Congressmen/women Quotes; Donald Trump Notes; Jeopardy! Masters Ad; Kentucky Derby Hat Week; Catchphrase (Jimmy Fallon & Kate Hudson Vs. Chrissy Teigen & John Legend); Kate Hudson performed "Gonna Find Out"
1966	May 3, 2024	Simu Liu, WILLOW	WILLOW
Jimmy explains Cinco de Mayo; Marijuana Ad; Thank You Notes; Kentucky Derby Hat Week; Puppy Predictors: 2024 Kentucky Derby Edition; Tonight Show Flip Shots (Simu Liu, WILLOW, Rosalía); WILLOW performed "Home"
1967	May 6, 2024	Laura Linney, Hannah Waddingham	The Cast of Stereophonic
Donald Trump Rap Video; Tonight Show News & Improved; Tonight Show Battle of the Instant Songwriters; Hannah Waddingham and Jimmy performed "I Was Made for Lovin' You"; The Cast of Stereophonic performed "Masquerade"
1968	May 7, 2024	Luis & Lin-Manuel Miranda, Josh Charles	Fontaines D.C.
Trump Toilet Wine Ad; Stu Ledman; Tonight Show Trivia Night; Tonight Show Jinx Challenge (Luis & Lin-Manuel Miranda Vs. Jimmy Fallon & Josh Charles); Fontaines D.C. performed "Starburster"
1969	May 8, 2024	Whoopi Goldberg, Gracie Abrams	Gracie Abrams
AI Let It Be Footage; Tonight Show #hashtags: #MomQuotes; Whoopi Goldberg brings the crew pastries; Hey Robot... (Whoopi Goldberg); Gracie Abrams performed "Risk"
1970	May 9, 2024	Michael Phelps, Jon Glaser	Laufey
Tariq is upset about things being recalled; Mother's Day Ads; Tonight Show WePost; Maya Rudolph makes a surprise appearance; Michael Phelps teaches Jimmy how to do a hip airplane; Water War (Michael Phelps); Laufey performed "Goddess"
1971	May 10, 2024	John Krasinski, Brooke Shields, Tracy Sierra	Jimmy Carr
Tonight Show You Pick the Joke; Jimmy performed a Mother's Day song; Thank You Notes
1972	May 13, 2024	Snoop Dogg, Jonathan Bailey, Michelle Wie West	Young Miko featuring Feid
Breakdown of the Crowd at Trump's Jersey Shore Rally; Donald Trump Audio (Jimmy portrays Trump); Donald Trump/Attorney Quotes; Tonight Show Connections; Snoop Dogg brings drinks; Young Miko featuring Feid performed "Offline"
1973	May 14, 2024	Robert De Niro, Chelsea Handler	Ms. Lauryn Hill & YG Marley
Robert De Niro and Jimmy do the TikTok portrait challenge at the top of the program; the nuts vendor in the intro demands payment for 10 years' worth of unpaid product; Jimmy reflects on the 10th anniversary of the broadcast and his friendship with Steve Higgins and The Roots; Tonight Show Go On, Git!; Ms. Lauryn Hill & YG Marley performed a medley of songs
1974	May 15, 2024	Will Forte; S. Epatha Merkerson, Miranda Rae Mayo & Jason Beghe	The cast of The Great Gatsby
Other Names Michael Cohen Called Trump; Tonight Show #hashtags: #Gradvice; Captain Wilson & First Officer Peters (Will Forte); Jimmy brings S. Epatha Merkerson, Miranda Rae Mayo & Jason Beghe pizza; The cast of The Great Gatsby performed "My Green Light"
1975	May 16, 2024	Drew Barrymore, Peso Pluma	Peso Pluma
Donald Trump Interview Using Audio Clips; Tonight Show WePost; Pearls of Wisdom with Goat Leg Greg and Gilvin of the Tree (Drew Barrymore); Peso Pluma performed "La Durango"
1976	May 17, 2024	Gayle King, JoJo Siwa	Rachel Feinstein
Tonight Show News Smash; Hashtag the Panda; Thank You Notes; Tonight Show Gift Guide: Spoons, Socks
1977	May 20, 2024	Eddie Redmayne, Michael McDonald & Paul Reiser	Tems
Trump's Teleprompter Operator; Michael Rispoli; Statue Quotes; Tonight Show Sponsors; Password (Michael McDonald & Paul Reiser Vs. Jimmy Fallon & Eddie Redmayne); Eddie Redmayne teaches Jimmy how to perform "Willkommen"; Tems performed "Born in the Wild/Love Me JeJe"
1978	May 21, 2024	Bill Maher, Rose Byrne, Andrew Jarecki	ZAYN
Stenographer Leaks; Debate Polls; Kohl's Ad; Austin Butler Phone Call (Jimmy portrays Butler); Ask Alexa; ZAYN performed "Alienated"
1979	May 22, 2024	Jeremy Renner, Jay Pharoah	The Avett Brothers
Tonight Show The News in Pictures; FBI Quotes; Roger Garvin; Cannes Film Festival Audience Member; Millennial Staff Writer; Egg Russian Roulette (Jeremy Renner); Jay Pharoah does impressions; The Avett Brothers performed "Love of a Girl"
1980	May 23, 2024	Chris Pratt, Erin Andrews & Charissa Thompson	Red Clay Strays
Audience made up of servicemen/women; Company Stock; United States Space Force member reads monologue joke; Tonight Show Superlatives; Jimmy runs through the service's schedule; Thank You Notes; Lasagna Cornhole (Chris Pratt & Jimmy Fallon with servicemen/women); Red Clay Strays performed "Wanna Be Loved"

=== June ===
No.	Original release date	Guest(s)	Musical/entertainment guest(s)
1981	June 3, 2024	Jessica Alba, Marlon Wayans	The cast of The Outsiders
Tariq goes through news stories; Tonight Show Pie Charts; Reverse Charades (Jessica Alba & Jimmy Fallon Vs. Tariq & Marlon Wayans); The cast of The Outsiders performed "Great Expectations"
1982	June 4, 2024	Will Smith & Martin Lawrence, Matt Smith	Megan Moroney
Dr. Pepper Fan Quotes; Bar Stool Interview; Tonight Show WePost; Tonight Show True Confessions (Will Smith & Martin Lawrence); Megan Moroney performed "No Caller ID"
1983	June 5, 2024	Jim Gaffigan, Cole Escola, Andrew Huberman	Shaboozey
Olympic Sports Ideas; Donald Trump Ad; Tonight Show Superlatives; Jim Gaffigan and Jimmy have Gaffigan's new bourbon; Cole Escola brings the wig from his Broadway play; Andrew Huberman leads the crew and audience through a meditation exercise; Shaboozey performed "A Bar Song (Tipsy)"
1984	June 6, 2024	Ariana Grande, Ron Howard, Richard Gadd & Jessica Gunning	Ariana Grande
Senator Quotes; Donald Trump Ad; Politician Quotes; Thank You Notes; Ron Howard directs Jimmy for a moment; Ariana Grande performed "The Boy Is Mine"
1985	June 10, 2024	Steve Carell, Amandla Stenberg, Noah Lyles	Carly Pearce
Donald Trump Interview (using audio clips); Magazine Questions; Restaurant Chain Quotes; That Feeling When; Amandla Stenberg plays violin; Carly Pearce performed "Truck on Fire"
1986	June 11, 2024	Will Ferrell, Meghan Trainor	Meghan Trainor
Rudy Giuliani Supporters; Tonight Show WePost; debut of trailer for Squad Busters; Will Ferrell comes out as Ron Burgundy; Tonight Show Movie Catchphrase (Will Ferrell); Tonight Show Singing Whisper Challenge (Meghan Trainor); Meghan Trainor performed "Whoops"
1987	June 12, 2024	Camila Cabello, Questlove	Camila Cabello
Ben Dalton; Tonight Show #hashtags: #DadQuotes; Camila Cabello performed an original song based on The Tonight Show Starring Jimmy Fallon; Tonight Show Dance Charades (Camila Cabello); Questlove gives the audience copies of his new book; Camila Cabello performed "I Luv It"
1988	June 13, 2024	Ayo Edebiri, Talking Heads	The Linda Lindas
Emoji Statements; The Roots performed a version of the Olympics theme song; Thank You Notes; Freestylin' with The Roots; The Linda Lindas performed "Found a Job"
1989	June 17, 2024	Eddie Murphy, Matty Matheson	Diljit Dosanjh
Surgeon General's Warning; Bryson DeChambeau makes an appearance and lets the crew and audience touch the Stanley Cup; Jimmy talks about meeting Pope Francis; Tonight Show Battle of the Instant Songwriters; Eddie Murphy surprises the audience with special edition Beverly Hills Cop: Axel F jackets; Matty Matheson and Jimmy have ice cream with caviar; Diljit Dosanjh performed a medley of "Born to Shine" and "G.O.A.T."
1990	June 18, 2024	Kevin Costner, Chace Crawford	Shenseea
Prezagen Ad; Immigrant Statements; Congressmen/women Tinder Profiles; Tonight Show WePost; the crew give shoutouts; Shenseea performed "Keep a Place/Neva Neva"
1991	June 19, 2024	Joseph Gordon-Levitt, Luke Newton	Michael Che
Bottled Water Ads; Tonight Show Audience Trivia Night; Tonight Show Audience Suggestion Box (NBA Goes to Broadway, Tariq and Jimmy high five each other, House of the Dragon Ad, The Great Banito, Times Square Elmo gets dunked by John Franco); Joseph Gordon-Levitt plays guitar for his wife
1992	June 20, 2024	Emma Stone, Eva Longoria	Chappell Roan
Joe Biden/Donald Trump Interview (using clips); Educational Video; Tariq is upset about things being recalled; Chappell Roan performed "Good Luck, Babe!"

=== July ===
No.	Original release date	Guest(s)	Musical/entertainment guest(s)
1993	July 8, 2024	Scarlett Johansson, Joey King	Sublime
Congressmen/women Quotes; Jimmy and Tariq rap about Scarlett Johansson; Democratic Phone Call; Tonight Show Whisper Challenge (Scarlett Johansson); Sublime performed "Feel Like That"
1994	July 9, 2024	DJ Khaled, Rita Ora	Hannah Berner
Tonight Show WePost; DJ Khaled brings out his kids during the interview; Tonight Show Back That Track Up (DJ Khaled)
1995	July 10, 2024	Common & Pete Rock, Fabien Frankel & Ewan Mitchell, Keith Robinson	Common & Pete Rock featuring Posdnuos & Bilal
Democratic Quotes; Tonight Show Connections; Tonight Show Playlist Playoff (Common & Pete Rock); Common & Pete Rock featuring Posdnuos & Bilal performed "When the Sun Shines Again"
1996	July 11, 2024	Channing Tatum, Kevin Jonas	Phish
The crew take the elevator with Phish at the top of the program; Company Statements; Thank You Notes; Tonight Show Slap! Interview (Channing Tatum); Phish performed "Evolve"
1997	July 15, 2024	Natalie Portman, Julio Torres	Pete Yorn
Bug Spray Ad; AT&T User Statements; Soccer Player Statements; The Roots are sports fans; Tonight Show Popular Mathematics; Catchphrase (Natalie Portman & Jimmy Fallon Vs. Tariq & Julio Torres); Natalie Portman teaches Jimmy how to speak French; Pete Yorn performed "Real Good Love"
1998	July 16, 2024	Bobby Flay, Fran Lebowitz	Orlando Leyba
Questlove and Tariq re-enact a scene from The Bachelorette; Tonight Show WePost; Tonight Show 30 Seconds to... (Bobby Flay)
1999	July 17, 2024	Tracy Morgan, Anthony Ramos	Clairo
Robert F. Kennedy Jr./Donald Trump Phone Call (Jimmy portrays Trump); Fake Vs. Real Amazon.com Reviews; Star Snugglers; Tracy Morgan answers true/false questions; Clairo performed "Juna"
2000	July 18, 2024	Dave Bautista, Shawn Levy	Glass Animals
Lawmaker Statements; Thank You Notes; Dave Bautista plays an audience member during his own interview; Glass Animals performed "Show Pony"
2001	July 22, 2024	Ryan Reynolds, Tony Hale	Jimin
Graph Breakdown; Tonight Show Sponsors; Fallon Book Club; Ryan Reynolds comes out in a Deadpool float; Jimin performed "Who"
2002	July 23, 2024	Hugh Jackman, Ralph Macchio, John Owen Lowe	Ayra Starr
Kamala Harris Running Mate Announcement; 911 Call Audio; Fallon Book Club; Tonight Show Claw Machine Challenge (Hugh Jackman); Ayra Starr performed "Last Heartbreak Song"/"Woman Commando"
2003	July 24, 2024	Matt Damon, Josh Hartnett	HARDY
Presidential Poll; Elon Musk Statement; Alexa Problems; Tonight Show WePost; Fallon Book Club; What's Behind Me? (Matt Damon); Matt Damon and Jimmy performed "Sweet Caroline"; HARDY performed "Psycho"
2004	July 25, 2024	Rob Lowe, Sutton Foster, Christian Pulisic	Reggie Conquest
Rob Lowe volunteers to be Kamala Harris' running mate; Polling Higher Than JD Vance; Greg Jarmon; Fallon Book Club
2005	July 26, 2024	Nick Jonas, Sue Bird & Megan Rapinoe	Ice Spice
Peacock Ad; Official/Unofficial 2024 Summer Olympics Logos; Donald Trump Phone Call; Steve Higgins makes inappropriate jokes; Ryan Reynolds & Hugh Jackman breakdown Deadpool & Wolverine; Jorts (special appearance by Will Ferrell); Ice Spice performed "Did It First/Think U the Shit (Fart)"

=== August ===
No.	Original release date	Guest(s)	Musical/entertainment guest(s)
2006	August 12, 2024	Channing Tatum, Liza Colón-Zayas	Lawrence
Rachel Dratch makes a surprise appearance during the monologue; Olympics Recap Song; Jimmy recounts his hiatus, from being in Germany to the 2024 Summer Olympics; Tonight Show Reverse Staring Contest (Channing Tatum); Lawrence performed "Whatcha Want"
2007	August 13, 2024	Elizabeth Banks, Stephen Nedoroscik	Foster the People
Tariq and Jimmy rap about Stephen Nedoroscik; Tonight Show News & Improved; Tonight Show Jinx (Elizabeth Banks); Stephen Nedoroscik solves a Rubik's Cube; Foster the People performed "Lost in Space"
2008	August 14, 2024	Kim Kardashian, Daveed Diggs, Charlie Vickers	Jessica Keenan
Joe Biden/Kamala Harris Texts; Random People Quotes; Tonight Show WePost; Kim Kardashian debuts her new product line
2009	August 15, 2024	Halle Berry, Ben Schwartz	Ravyn Lenae
Trump Family Quotes; Thank You Notes; Egg Russian Roulette (Halle Berry); Ravyn Lenae performed "Genius/Love Me Not"
2010	August 19, 2024	Michael Keaton, Taylor Tomlinson	Rapsody featuring Erykah Badu
Democratic Ad; Tariq is upset about things being recalled; Tonight Show Polls; Rapsody featuring Erykah Badu performed "3:AM/Green Eyes"
2011	August 20, 2024	Adam Sandler, will.i.am, Liz Moore	Julian McCullough
Democratic National Convention Ad; Political Phone Call; will.i.am debuts his new radio service
2012	August 21, 2024	Jenna Ortega, Jason Schwartzman	Thomas Rhett
Lawmaker Quotes; Tonight Show Connections; Tonight Show True Confessions (Jenna Ortega & Catherine O'Hara); Jenna Ortega ranks film scores; Jason Schwartzman gets his ear pierced; Thomas Rhett performed "After All the Bars Are Closed"
2013	August 22, 2024	Zoë Kravitz, Sabrina Carpenter, Melanie Hamrick	Sabrina Carpenter
Political Poems; Tonight Show Political Compliments; Starbucks Ad; Jimmy announces his new children's book and haunted maze attraction, Jimmy Fallon's TonightMares; Ew! sketch (Zoë Kravitz & Sabrina Carpenter); Melanie Hamrick teaches Jimmy ballet; Sabrina Carpenter performed "Please Please Please"

=== September ===
No.	Original release date	Guest(s)	Musical/entertainment guest(s)
2014	September 3, 2024	Taraji P. Henson, Katie Ledecky	Tierra Whack
Carl Page; Tonight Show Sponsors; Jimmy gives the audience a copy of his new children's book; Dating App Duets (Taraji P. Henson); Taraji P. Henson and Jimmy have hot dogs; Tierra Whack performed "Moovies/Shower Song"
2015	September 4, 2024	Justin Theroux, Simone Biles	Cage the Elephant
Questlove and Tariq re-enact a scene from The Bachelorette; Tonightmare; Good Cop, Goth Cop (Justin Theroux); Cage the Elephant performed "Rainbow"
2016	September 5, 2024	Kevin Hart, Paris Hilton	Miranda Lambert
NFL Player Statements; Tonightmare; Tonight Show Go On, Git!; Facebreakers (Kevin Hart); Miranda Lambert performed "Wranglers"
2017	September 9, 2024	Demi Moore, Eve Hewson	St. Vincent
Demi Moore and Jimmy meet up in her dressing room at the top of the program; Presidential Debate Eve; Michael Che & Colin Jost tell the monologue jokes; Jeopardy! Categories; Tonight Show WePost; Tonightmare; Box of Lies (Demi Moore); St. Vincent performed "Flea"
2018	September 10, 2024	Steve Martin, Martin Short & Selena Gomez, Lainey Wilson	Lainey Wilson
Debate Ads; Congressmen Quotes; LMFAO Tribute Band; Tonight Show Popular Mathematics; DJ Khaled makes a surprise appearance; Tonightmare; Tonight Show Name That Song Challenge (Steve Martin & Selena Gomez Vs. Martin Short & Jimmy Fallon); Lainey Wilson and Jimmy take shots; Lainey Wilson performed "4x4xU"
2019	September 11, 2024	Kathryn Hahn, Jayson Tatum	Nore Davis
Undecided Voter; Ben Flanagan; Jimmy raps about his new children's book (with Jayson Tatum); Tonightmare; Tonight Show Song Scenes (Kathryn Hahn)
2020	September 12, 2024	Lupita Nyong'o, Cristin Milioti	Talib Kweli & J. Rawls
Frank Klebbin; Jeopardy! Categories; Tonightmare; Thank You Notes; Tell Apart the Apple Watches; Talib Kweli & J. Rawls performed "Native Sons"
2021	September 16, 2024	Justin Timberlake, Meghann Fahy	Yseult
Tonight Show WePost; Tonightmare; Tonight Show Playlist Playoff (Justin Timberlake); Meghann Fahy teaches Jimmy a dance move; Yseult performed "Suicide"
2022	September 17, 2024	Colin Farrell, Lily Collins, Mike Shinoda	Linkin Park
World Liberty Financial Ad; Jimmy shows a video about his guests; Zayn Malik makes a surprise appearance; Quick Fun Trivia; Tonightmare; Linkin Park performed "The Emptiness Machine"
2023	September 18, 2024	Eva Mendes, Zachary Quinto	Brandi Denise
Guy with No Opinion; Steve Higgins mispronounces things; Tonight Show Monday Motivations; Tonightmare; Tonight Show 30 Seconds to... (Eva Mendes); Zachary Quinto and Jimmy do poses
2024	September 19, 2024	Demi Lovato, Hillary Rodham Clinton	Twenty One Pilots
Chad Franks; Tonightmare; the staff celebrate Jimmy's 50th birthday (appearance by Demi Lovato); Demi Lovato brings Jimmy an ice cream cake; Tonight Show Face It Challenge (Demi Lovato); Hillary Rodham Clinton gives Jimmy a signed copy of her new book; Twenty One Pilots performed "Routines in the Night"
2025	September 23, 2024	Michael Strahan, Sebastian Maniscalco	Leon Bridges
Donald Trump Slang; Daniel Green; Tonight Show News & Improved; Jimmy gets the iPhone 16 Pro (special appearance by Tim Cook); Tonight Show Battle of the Instant Songwriters; Leon Bridges performed "That's What I Love"
2026	September 24, 2024	Keith Urban, Margaret Qualley	Keith Urban
Donald Trump Excuse Generator; Tonight Show WePost; Pictionary (Keith Urban & Tariq Vs. Jimmy Fallon & Margaret Qualley); Keith Urban performed "Espresso"; Keith Urban performed "Chuck Taylors"
2027	September 25, 2024	Shaquille O'Neal, Chloë Sevigny	MJ Lenderman
Dale Weathers; Duolingo Ad; Tonight Show Polls; Jimmy responds to Mark Consuelos addressing his plea to drop out of the race for People's Sexiest TV Host by putting out an attack ad of his own to defend his honor; Shaquille O'Neal gives the audience his new line of candy; Tonight Show Glamour Shots (Shaquille O'Neal); MJ Lenderman performed "Wristwatch"
2028	September 26, 2024	Cate Blanchett, Marcello Hernández	Nick Griffin
JD Vance Coin Ad; Educational Video; Jimmy goes through the Jimmy Fallon's Tonightmares attraction at Rockfeller Center (special appearance by Prince Harry, Duke of Sussex); Thank You Notes; Tonight Show Guest Test (Cate Blanchett); Marcello Hernández brings out champagne
2029	September 30, 2024	Kate McKinnon, Kit Connor & Rachel Zegler, Jelly Roll	Jelly Roll & mgk
Debate Promo; @TheNomNomBeast; Jimmy recaps the month; Tonight Show Sponsors; Tonight Show Connections; Jelly Roll & mgk performed "Lonely Road"

=== October ===
No.	Original release date	Guest(s)	Musical/entertainment guest(s)
2030	October 1, 2024	Sarah Paulson, Jack Antonoff	Teddy Swims
Reporter Footage; Campaign Ad; Politician Statements; the cameraman wants wig glue; Tariq is upset about things being recalled; Tonight Show WePost; Tonight Show Mute! (Sarah Paulson); Teddy Swims performed "The Door"
2031	October 2, 2024	Luke Bryan, Colin Kaepernick	Luke Bryan
60 Minutes Ad; Love Is Blind Ad; Tonight Show Trivia Night; Password (Colin Kaepernick & Jimmy Fallon Vs. The Roots); Luke Bryan performed "Love You, Miss You, Mean It"
2032	October 3, 2024	Chris Martin, Chase Stokes	Sabrina Carpenter
Darnell Booker; Derek Gaines; Joker: Folie à Deux Trailer; Jimmy goes through the Jimmy Fallon's Tonightmares attraction at Universal's Halloween Horror Nights (special appearance by Demi Lovato); Chris Martin portrays an audience member; Chris Martin performed "We Pray" with Jimmy impersonating various recording artists; Sabrina Carpenter performed "Espresso"
2033	October 7, 2024	Hoda Kotb, Henrik Lundqvist, Gabriel LaBelle	Vampire Weekend
Donald Trump Interview; Jimmy and Tariq rap about Henrik Lundqvist; Tonight Show Popular Mathematics; the crew do shoutouts; Vampire Weekend performed "Connect"
2034	October 8, 2024	Chris Pine, Nicholas Braun	Mary Mack
Chad Franks; Tonight Show Go On, Git!; Chris Pine recites "Espresso" in Italian; Tonight Show Tailgate Hot Wing Challenge
2035	October 9, 2024	Pharrell Williams, Rachel Sennott, FINNEAS	FINNEAS
Politician Quotes; Steve Higgins goes through political biographies; Baseball Player Quotes; A Complete Unknown Trailer; the audience gets tickets to Piece by Piece; FINNEAS performed "Lotus Eater"
2036	October 10, 2024	Jordan Peele, Madelyn Cline	Kane Brown
Fandom Quotes; Joe Biden Statement; A Republican; Baby Bronco; Blind Rank Horror Challenge (Jordan Peele); Kane Brown performed "Backseat Driver"
2037	October 21, 2024	Samuel L. Jackson, Justin Hartley	Tommy Richman
New Yorker Statements; Donald Trump Audio; Flu Shot Ad; Questlove and Tariq re-enact a scene from Love Is Blind; Tonight Show Monday Motivations; Scare of the Week (with State Farm); Hey Robot... (Justin Hartley); Tommy Richman performed "Temptations"
2038	October 22, 2024	Tom Holland, Bridget Everett	Damiano David
Percy Yates; Tom Holland brings his new line of beer; Tonight Show 5–Second Summaries (Tom Holland); Damiano David performed "Silverlines"
2039	October 23, 2024	Megan Thee Stallion, Billy Crystal, Julian Casablancas	The Voidz
Sports Player Quotes; the crew name their favorite horror films; New York Liberty make a surprise appearance; The Voidz performed "7 Horses"
2040	October 24, 2024	Sacha Baron Cohen, Brett Goldstein	Ian Lara
James Carville Interview; Baseball Cards; Thank You Notes; Sacha Baron Cohen portrays Ali G & Borat Sagdiyev
2041	October 28, 2024	Reba McEntire, Lauren Lapkus, A.J. & Big Justice and The Rizzler	Sevdaliza featuring Yseult
Statue Quotes; Tonight Show News & Improved; Reba McEntire poses with Jimmy for his Christmas card; Lauren Lapkus identifies various sitcom theme songs; Sevdaliza featuring Yseult performed "Alibi"
2042	October 29, 2024	Olivia Rodrigo, Keri Russell, Andrea Bocelli	Andrea Bocelli featuring Lauren Daigle
Jimmy performed a parody of "One Week"; New York Yankees fans performed impromptu songs; What's Behind Me? (Olivia Rodrigo); Keri Russell teaches Jimmy a dance move; Andrea Bocelli featuring Lauren Daigle performed "Canto della Terra"
2043	October 30, 2024	Salma Hayek Pinault, David Chang	Kelsea Ballerini
Jimmy announces his new holiday album; Tonight Show Connections; Salma Hayek Pinault teaches Jimmy her dance from From Dusk till Dawn; Kelsea Ballerini performed "Patterns"
2044	October 31, 2024	Anthony Mackie, Sarah Sherman	Shin Lim
Steve Higgins mispronounces candies; Political Ad; Larry Mulwin; Tonight Show Audience Suggestion Box (Jimmy jumps into leaves, Halloween costume ideas, Halloween pranks, Black Simon & Garfunkel); Sarah Sherman tells scary stories

=== November ===
No.	Original release date	Guest(s)	Musical/entertainment guest(s)
2045	November 4, 2024	Kevin Kline, Lester Holt	Maddie Wiener
Politician Quotes; Tonight Show Polls; Tonight Show Battle of the Instant Songwriters; Jimmy brings Lester Holt a basket of candy
2046	November 6, 2024	Whoopi Goldberg, Rosie Perez, Conrad Ricamora	Bailey Zimmerman
Martin Cleeder; New Yorker Reactions; Tonight Show Polls; Whoopi Goldberg brings out dumplings for the crew; Bailey Zimmerman performed "Holding On"
2047	November 7, 2024	Saoirse Ronan, Carmelo Anthony, David Gilmour	David Gilmour & The Roots
Politician Statements; Yellowstone Promo; Tariq and Jimmy rap about Saoirse Ronan; Thank You Notes; Wine Time! (Saoirse Ronan, Carmelo Anthony); David Gilmour & The Roots performed "Dark and Velvet Nights"
2048	November 11, 2024	Dwayne Johnson, Rebecca Ferguson	Ella Langley & Riley Green
Audience made up of veterans; Military Ads; Tariq is upset about things being recalled; Butterball Ad; Holiday Questions with the Elf on the Shelf (Dwayne Johnson); Dwayne Johnson and Jimmy exchange gifts; Dwayne Johnson invites the audience to a screening of Red One; Ella Langley & Riley Green performed "You Look Like You Love Me"
2049	November 12, 2024	Jeff Goldblum, Luke Grimes, Lacey Chabert	Luke Grimes
Luke Grimes performed "Black Powder"
2050	November 13, 2024	Cynthia Erivo, Martha Stewart, Travis Fimmel	Emma Willmann
Jimmy chats with Tariq at the top of the program (special appearance by Martha Stewart); Unpopular Toys; Patrick Hannigan; Cynthia Erivo whistles "Over the Rainbow" & does the final note of "Defying Gravity"; Tonight Show Musical Genre Challenge (Cynthia Erivo); Martha Stewart and Jimmy have cocktails; Travis Fimmel brings his brand of beer
2051	November 14, 2024	Ariana Grande, Michael Bublé	Michael Bublé
Jimmy chats with Michael Bublé at the top of the program; Fandom Signs; Jake Paul vs. Mike Tyson Ad; Company Lawsuits; The Roots have an alternative group; Tonight Show Fake That Shake; Ariana Grande brings Jimmy a present; Michael Bublé performed "Bring It On Home to Me"
2052	November 17, 2024	Jon Hamm, Lindsay Lohan	Pharrell
Steve Holden; Tonight Show Superlatives; Lindsay Lohan & Jon Hamm portray Hallmark Channel Original Movies characters; Ariana Grande and Cynthia Erivo performed a song about Wicked; Jimmy and Jon Hamm remake the classic 1999 music video for "With Arms Wide Open"; Lindsay Lohan and Jimmy have pizza; Pharrell performed "Piece by Piece"
2053	November 18, 2024	Cher, Zoey Deutch	Gwen Stefani
Dr. Robert Denbow; Tonight Show WePost; Tim and Tam Variety Hour (Cher); Gwen Stefani performed "Bouquet"
2054	November 19, 2024	Keke Palmer, William Zabka, Mickey Drexler	Rauw Alejandro
A song about Thanksgiving; audience member raps about football; Jimmy announces his new line of pajamas; Pajama Password (Jimmy Fallon & Keke Palmer Vs. Tariq Trotter & William Zabka); William Zabka shows Jimmy how to do a karate jab-punch combo; Rauw Alejandro performed a medley of songs
2055	November 20, 2024	Richard Gere, Bowen Yang	Jin
Makeover Monologue (Richard Gere); Tariq fills in for Steve Higgins as announcer; Wicked Reviews; Local News Anchors Ruin Thanksgiving; Carter Wainscott; Tonight Show Lookalikes; Jin teaches Jimmy how to do his "Super Tuna" dance; Jin performed "Running Wild"
2056	November 21, 2024	Gwyneth Paltrow, DJ Khaled	TV on the Radio
Tariq fills in for Steve Higgins as announcer; Celebrities Then & Now; Tariq raps about LA; Tonight Show True Confessions (Gwyneth Paltrow, DJ Khaled); TV on the Radio performed "Staring at the Sun"
2057	November 25, 2024	Kaley Cuoco; Rickie Fowler, Xander Schauffele, Matt Fitzpatrick & Cameron Young	GloRilla
Thanksgiving Travel Tips; Paul Mescal & Denzel Washington's Stand–Ins; Tonight Show Whisper Challenge (Kaley Cuoco); Rickie Fowler, Xander Schauffele, Matt Fitzpatrick and Cameron Young play Jimmy in a round of skee-golf; GloRilla performed "I Luv Her"
2058	November 26, 2024	Anthony Anderson, Jodie Turner-Smith	D.J. Demers
Thanksgiving Seating Chart; Moana 2 Ad; Thanksgiving Song; Jimmy Fallon, Gwen Stefani & The Roots sing "Hollaback Girl" with classroom instruments; Tonight Show Pick! Pick! Pick the Box!
2059	November 27, 2024	Ben Stiller, Katie Holmes	Heavy MakeUp
Thanksgiving Substitutions; Tom Holden; Thanksgiving Documentary; Catchphrase (Tariq Trotter & Katie Holmes Vs. Ben Stiller & Jimmy Fallon); Heavy MakeUp performed "Under Construction"
2060	November 28, 2024	Jerry Seinfeld, Cody Rhodes	Billy Strings
The Turkettes (Cher and Jimmy Fallon) perform a medley of Cher's greatest hits at the top of the program; Football Player Quotes; Black Friday Ads; Thank You Notes; Jimmy Fallon performs "Chipmunks & Chestnuts" from his album Holiday Seasoning; Billy Strings performed "Seven Weeks in County"

=== December ===
No.	Original release date	Guest(s)	Musical/entertainment guest(s)
2061	December 2, 2024	Lin-Manuel Miranda, Shailene Woodley	Nathy Peluso
Conservative Holidays; AMC Theatres Ad; Tonight Show 12 Days of Christmas Sweaters; Tonight Show Musical Jinx Challenge (Lin-Manuel Miranda); Nathy Peluso performed a medley of songs
2062	December 3, 2024	Amy Adams, Fortune Feimster	Dan + Shay
Donald Trump Ad; Spotify User Data; Tonight Show 12 Days of Christmas Sweaters; Tonight Show Tell Me Why (Amy Adams); Dan + Shay performed "The Cozy Song"
2063	December 4, 2024	Ice-T, Isabella Rossellini	Body Count
John Thune Statement; Unknown Fan Call; Tonight Show 12 Days of Christmas Sweaters; Tonight Show Back That Track Up; Body Count performed "Comfortably Numb"
2064	December 5, 2024	Angelina Jolie, Sebastian Stan, Andrew Ridgeley	Laura Peek
National Christmas Tree Music Acts; Joe's Wine Employee; the crew list off favorite holiday films; Tonight Show 12 Days of Christmas Sweaters
2065	December 9, 2024	Keira Knightley, Christian Slater	Dean Edwards
Tonight Show Shake It Out; App Quotes; Tonight Show 12 Days of Christmas Sweaters; Tonight Show Best Thing Ever (Keira Knightley)
2066	December 10, 2024	John Mulaney, Linda Cardellini	Julien Baker & Torres
John Hannigan; JCPenney Ad; Tonight Show 12 Days of Christmas Sweaters; Tonight Show Stocking Stuffers; Tonight Show Go On, Git!; Jimmy gives John Mulaney a gift; Julien Baker & Torres performed "Sugar in the Tank"
2067	December 11, 2024	Ray Romano, Rosé	Rosé
Christmas Ads; Senator Statements; Tonight Show 12 Days of Christmas Sweaters; Tonight Show Stocking Stuffers; Tonight Show Battle of the Instant Songwriters; Rosé performed a medley of songs
2068	December 12, 2024	Lisa Kudrow, Elle Fanning, Jack Huston	Kamasi Washington
AI Footage; Eddie Blaylott; parody of Friday Night Lights; Tonight Show 12 Days of Christmas Sweaters (appearance by Chris Rock); Tonight Show Stocking Stuffers; Kamasi Washington performed "Lesanu"
2069	December 16, 2024	Fred Armisen, Lily-Rose Depp, André 3000	André 3000
Bruce Springsteen Audio; Various Ads; Bob Dylan Audio; Tonight Show 12 Days of Christmas Sweaters; Tonight Show Stocking Stuffers; Fred Armisen demonstrates how drum solos work; André 3000 performed "BuyPoloDisorder's Daughter Wears A 3000® Shirt Embroidered"
2070	December 17, 2024	Michael Fassbender, Lee Jung-jae	Dustin Nickerson
Tonight Show 12 Days of Christmas Sweaters; Tonight Show Stocking Stuffers; Jimmy lights up the studio before gifting a lucky audience member their choice of a car
2071	December 18, 2024	Nate Bargatze, Jessica Williams, Nicole Avant	Darlene Love featuring Little Steven and the Disciples of Soul
Businessmen Statements; Updated Christmas Songs; Zack French & Everett Woodley; Tiny Song; Tonight Show 12 Days of Christmas Sweaters; Tonight Show Stocking Stuffers; Darlene Love featuring Little Steven & The Disciples of Soul performed "Christmas (Baby Please Come Home)"
2072	December 19, 2024	Martin Short, Chloe Fineman	Jimmy Fallon & The Roots
Ben Delaney; Tonight Show 12 Days of Christmas Sweaters; Tonight Show Stocking Stuffers; Tonight Show Random Instrument Challenge (Martin Short, Chloe Fineman); Chloe Fineman does impressions; Jimmy Fallon & The Roots performed "Hey Rudy"

== Sources ==
- Official website
- Lineups at Interbridge
