= List of The Tonight Show Starring Jimmy Fallon episodes (2025) =

- No. of episodes: 156 (and 1 special)

Release
- Original network: NBC
- Original release: January 6 – December 18, 2025

Season chronology
- ← Previous; 2024 episodes Next → 2026 episodes

This is the list of episodes for The Tonight Show Starring Jimmy Fallon in 2025.

== 2025 ==
=== January ===
| No. | Original release date | Guest(s) | Musical/entertainment guest(s) |
|---|---|---|---|
| 2073 | January 6, 2025 | Joe Manganiello, Charli D'Amelio | Busta Rhymes |
Congressmen Profiles; Mark Kelley sings about the members of the 119th Congress; Tonight Show Connections; Bully Beaters Karate (Joe Manganiello); Busta Rhymes performs a medley of songs
| 2074 | January 7, 2025 | Pamela Anderson, Andrew Rannells | Lil Baby |
Hulu/FuboTV Commercial; Ethan Beverly; Tonight Show Do Not Play; Box of Lies (Pamela Anderson); Lil Baby performs "I Promise"
| 2075 | January 8, 2025 | Jamie Lee Curtis, Mikey Madison | Michael Shannon & Jason Narducy |
New Facebook Ad; Matt Gaetz Slogans; Jimmy acknowledges the January 2025 Southern California wildfires; Tonight Show Lookalikes; Extended Scene from Perfect (Jamie Lee Curtis); Michael Shannon and Jason Narducy perform "Driver 8"
| 2076 | January 9, 2025 | Willie Geist, Pete Lee | Pete Lee |
Tonight Show Sponsors; two audience members who resemble AI photo; Jimmy acknowledges the January 2025 Southern California wildfires; Jimmy announces his Broadway debut
| 2077 | January 13, 2025 | Bad Bunny, Karla Sofía Gascón, Linus Sebastian | Bad Bunny |
Bad Bunny co-hosts the broadcast; Bad Bunny participates in the monologue; Bad Bunny and Jimmy performed on the 50th Street subway station below 30 Rockefeller Plaza; Linus Sebastian demonstrates technology from CES; Bad Bunny interviews Jimmy; Bad Bunny performs "Voy a Llevarte Pa' PR"; Note: Questlove recites the episode number in Spanish at the beginning.
| 2078 | January 14, 2025 | Jeff Daniels, Gabriel Basso | The Marías |
Lucas Moore; Kaleid-o-bility!; Tonight Show WePost; Jimmy acknowledges the January 2025 Southern California wildfires; TikTok Pie Charts; Any Answer Wins!; Jeff Daniels sings a song about the Bobby Layne curse; The Marías perform "No One Noticed"
| 2079 | January 15, 2025 | Savannah Guthrie & Craig Melvin, Sam Heughan | Lucy Dacus |
Politicians' Commemorative Drinks; Tariq is upset about things being recalled; Jimmy acknowledges the January 2025 Southern California wildfires; Know Your Co-Host (Savannah Guthrie & Craig Melvin); Sam Heughan makes a signature cocktail from his book; Lucy Dacus performs "Ankles"
| 2080 | January 16, 2025 | Kenny Chesney, Brooke Shields, Mekki Leeper | Dusty Slay |
Your Pillow Commercial; Tonight Show SportSmash; Songs from the Cameraman; Tonight Show Superlatives; Brooke Shields debuts her new line of hair care products
| 2081 | January 20, 2025 | Colin Jost, David Alan Grier, Dorinda Medley | Stereo MC's |
Jimmy comes out wearing Melania Trump's hat from Trump's inauguration; Biden leaves the White House in a parody of Up; Blended News Stories; Jimmy shows a clip of Colin Jost as a contestant on Weakest Link; Stereo MC's perform "Connected"
| 2082 | January 21, 2025 | Sarah Silverman, Bobby Cannavale, Lola Young | Lola Young |
Jimmy's monologue is interrupted by technical difficulties; President Trump Executive Orders; Jimmy recaps President Trump's schedule; Tonight Show News & Improved; Lola Young performs "Messy"
| 2083 | January 22, 2025 | Lucy Liu, Questlove | Debra DiGiovanni |
Guy Who Even Wears Shorts in the Winter; David Pekoske; Netflix Commercials; Jimmy finds letters left inside his desk; What Would Liu Do? (Lucy Liu)
| 2084 | January 23, 2025 | Denis Leary, Andie MacDowell | Teddy Swims |
Married Couple in the Audience; Tariq correctly guesses the sketch (Star Wars Character Statements); Tonight Show Superlatives; "Asshole" (Denis Leary); Teddy Swims performs "Bad Dreams"
| 2085 | January 27, 2025 | Shailene Woodley, Martha Stewart, Ryan Day | The cast of Death Becomes Her |
Philadelphia Eagles Player Statements; Jimmy asks his audience members what they're eating at the Super Bowl (Martha Stewart); Switch-Up; Ryan Day brings out the College Football Playoff National Championship Trophy; the cast of Death Becomes Her performs "For the Gaze"
| 2086 | January 28, 2025 | Amy Schumer, Joe Keery | Djo |
Steve Chambers; The Tonight Show Stock Watch; 67th Annual Grammy Awards Commercials; Tonight Show WePost; Freestylin’ with the Roots; Joe Keery gives Jimmy a "Djimmy" jumpsuit; Djo performs "Basic Being Basic"
| 2087 | January 29, 2025 | Reese Witherspoon, Rob Gronkowski | Simply Red |
Trump Statements; Jimmy interviews ChatGPT and DeepSeek; Valentine's Day Ad; Tonight Show Go On, Git!; Tonight Show 30 Seconds to... (Rob Gronkowski); Simply Red performs "If You Don't Know Me by Now"
| 2088 | January 30, 2025 | Pete Davidson, Sadie Sink, Olivia Tiedemann | N/A |
Mikey Angelo recaps the month at the top of the program; NFL Player Statements; The Roots swap each other out with cardboard cutouts; Netflix Buttons; Pictionary (Jimmy Fallon & Sadie Sink Vs. Tariq & Pete Davidson); Tonight Show Strangest Thing (Sadie Sink)

=== February ===
| No. | Original release date | Guest(s) | Musical/entertainment guest(s) |
|---|---|---|---|
| 2089 | February 3, 2025 | Adrien Brody, Idina Menzel | Aaron Weber |
Tequila Owner Statements; Rick Benson; Tonight Show Connections; Tonight Show Battle of the Instant Songwriters
| 2090 | February 4, 2025 | Bill Gates, Lauren Graham | Japanese Breakfast |
Donald Trump Mispronunciations; Best Buy Super Bowl Ads; Tonight Show WePost; "I Could Jump It" (Bill Gates and Connie Chung); Japanese Breakfast performs "Orlando in Love"
| 2091 | February 5, 2025 | Christina Ricci, Ke Huy Quan, the cast of Cobra Kai | Gigi Perez |
Papa John's Tracker; Guy Who Just Got Back from North Korea; Tariq's Inner Thoughts; Jimmy announces his new children's book; Tonight Show Trivia Night; Tonight Show Search Party (Cobra Kai Cast & Jimmy Fallon Vs. Cobra Kai Cast & Tariq); Gigi Perez performs "Sailor Song"
| 2092 | February 6, 2025 | Kieran Culkin, Kenan Thompson & Marcello Hernández | Sharon Van Etten & The Attachment Theory |
Tariq's Nacho Supreme; NFL Fashion Show; Switch-Up; "The Super Bowl Song" (Dion Flynn); Puppy Predictors: Super Bowl LIX Edition; Freestyle Rap (Kenan Thompson & Marcello Hernández); Sharon Van Etten & The Attachment Theory perform "Southern Life (What It Must Be Like)"
| 2093 | February 10, 2025 | Jim Gaffigan, Betty Gilpin, Mary Ellen Matthews | Adam Lambert |
Paul Shaffer and the World's Most Dangerous Band fill in for The Roots; Chiefs Super Bowl LIX Highlights; Super Bowl Excuse Generator; David Letterman crashes the monologue; Jimmy does an SNL photo shoot with Mary Ellen Matthews; Adam Lambert performs "I Don’t Care Much"; Note: Instead of saying the episode number at the beginning, Shaffer said "Questlove, come home!"
| 2094 | February 11, 2025 | Jalen Hurts & Saquon Barkley, Jaylen Brown, Anna Cathcart | Leslie Liao |
Jimmy checks in with Jalen Hurts and Saquon Barkley at the top of the program; Paul Shaffer and the World's Most Dangerous Band fill in for The Roots; Big Tech CEO Posts; Tonight Show WePost; Super Bowl Bingo; Saquon Barkley plays a voicemail from his daughter; Shotgun Beers (Jalen Hurts, Saquon Barkley, Lane Johnson, Landon Dickerson, Cam Jurgens, Mekhi Becton, and Jordan Mailata); Note: Instead of saying the episode number at the beginning, Shaffer said "Hey, am I in the right studio?"
| 2095 | February 12, 2025 | Tina Fey & Amy Poehler, Leo Woodall | Larry June, 2 Chainz & The Alchemist |
Paul Shaffer and the World's Most Dangerous Band fill in for The Roots; Jimmy imitates Elon Musk and his four-year-old son; Ken Bowman; Jimmy recaps the reality TV premieres of the week; Tonight Show Joke Off (Tina Fey, Amy Poehler, & Seth Meyers); Valentine's Day Cards; Larry June, 2 Chainz and The Alchemist perform "Life Is Beautiful"; Note: Instead of saying the episode number at the beginning, Shaffer said "We throw it back!"
| 2096 | February 13, 2025 | Renée Zellweger, Halsey | The Lumineers |
Paul Shaffer and the World's Most Dangerous Band fill in for The Roots; Valentine's Day Stats; Senator Health Tips; Motel 6 Commercial in the style of The White Lotus; Jimmy announces his new portrait at Sardi's; Thank You Notes; Tonight Show Kid Theater (Renée Zellweger); The Lumineers perform "Same Old Song"; Note: Instead of saying the episode number at the beginning, Shaffer said "We’re going back to our roots!"
| 2097 | February 24, 2025 | Chelsea Handler, Billy Crudup, Matthew Tkachuk | Waxahatchee |
Jimmy recaps Elon Musk's weekly schedule; Jimmy discusses hosting SNL50: The Homecoming Concert; Tonight Show Yassify Week; Jimmy gives Billy Crudup his own portrait for Sardi's celebrity wall; Waxahatchee performs "Much Ado About Nothing"
| 2098 | February 25, 2025 | Kate Hudson, Jeff Probst, Tate McRae | Caitlin Peluffo |
Questlove and Tariq re-enact a scene from The Bachelor; TheraFlew Commercial; Tonight Show Yassify Week; Random Object Free Throw (Kate Hudson); Jimmy has the audience vote on suggested game elements for Survivor season 50; Tate McRae teaches Jimmy how to do the "It's OK I'm OK" dance
| 2099 | February 26, 2025 | Simu Liu, Floyd Mayweather | Jason Isbell |
Tarik hasn’t seen any of the Best Picture nominees; Tonight Show Yassify Week; Jimmy plays a recording of Simu Liu’s childhood boy band; Tonight Show Last Breath (Jimmy & Questlove Vs. Tariq & Simu Liu); Jason Isbell performs "Ride to Robert's"
| 2100 | February 27, 2025 | Mark Ruffalo, Gabriel Iglesias | GIVĒON |
Donald Trump's Movie Reviews; Kaleid-o-bility!; Rhyme the Month; Tonight Show Yassify Week; Jimmy Becomes Fully Immersed in His Audiobook (in partnership with Audible); Thank You Notes; Jimmy and Mark Ruffalo crowd surf into the audience; Gabriel Iglesias announces his handprint at Grauman’s Chinese Theatre; GIVĒON performs "TWENTIES"

=== March ===
| No. | Original release date | Guest(s) | Musical/entertainment guest(s) |
|---|---|---|---|
| 2101 | March 3, 2025 | Michael Strahan, Giada De Laurentiis | The cast of Maybe Happy Ending |
Hulu Apology Ad; Tonight Show Sponsors; Models and Buckets (Michael Strahan); Michael Strahan gives Jimmy a custom jacket to mark his twenty-first appearance on The Tonight Show; Jimmy tries chocolate pasta with Giada De Laurentiis; the cast of Maybe Happy Ending perform a medley of "Why Love?" and "When You're In Love"
| 2102 | March 4, 2025 | Amanda Seyfried, Joshua Jackson | Tate McRae |
Tariq is upset about things being recalled; Tonight Show WePost; Jimmy and Joshua Jackson re-enact a scene from Dawson's Creek; Do Not Read; Amanda Seyfried plays the dulcimer; Tate McRae performs "Revolving door"; Note: Instead of saying the episode number at the beginning, Questove said "Oh, yeah!"
| 2103 | March 5, 2025 | Luke Bryan, Lionel Richie & Carrie Underwood, Stephen A. Smith, Kai Cenat | Inhaler |
Congressional Address Rebuttal Schedule; Tonight Show Name That Song Challenge (Jimmy & Carrie Underwood Vs. Luke Bryan & Lionel Richie); Hot Take Generator (Stephen A. Smith); Inhaler performs "Billy (Yeah Yeah Yeah)"
| 2104 | March 6, 2025 | Parker Posey, Alan Cumming, Rick Pitino | Julia Michaels & Maren Morris |
Jimmy performs a sea shanty about St. John's Red Storm with Rick Pinito at the top of the program; Chad Franks; House Hunters; Tariq corrects Jimmy on misspellings and perform a duet; Alan Cumming brings his dog Lala; Julia Michaels and Maren Morris perform a medley of "GFY" and "Scissors"
| 2105 | March 10, 2025 | Gal Gadot, The Traitors Season 3 Winners, J-Hope | J-Hope featuring Miguel |
Prime Minister Statements; J-Hope makes a surprise appearance during the monologue; Tonight Show Connections; Will Gal Ga-Do-It? (Gal Gadot); J-Hope featuring Miguel performs "Sweet Dreams"
| 2106 | March 11, 2025 | Millie Bobby Brown, Dwyane Wade | Sting & Shaggy |
Sting and Shaggy comment on Trump's economy; Tonight Show TikTok Stock Talk; Trump Tesla Cybertruck Commercial; Trump Deport Yourself App; Tonight Show WePost; Slay It, Don’t Spray It (Millie Bobby Brown); Sting and Shaggy perform "Til A Mawnin"
| 2107 | March 12, 2025 | Jesse Eisenberg, Bernadette Peters, Chet Hanks | Heather Pasternak |
Donald Trump Alphabet Song; Donald Trump Statements; Tariq and Jimmy repeat what they love about basketball; Jesse Eisenberg lives inside Jimmy's desk; Tonight Show Lookalikes; Bernadette Peters performs "Broadway Baby" from Stephen Sondheim's Old Friends
| 2108 | March 13, 2025 | Nick Jonas & Adrienne Warren, Anthony Michael Hall | The cast of The Last Five Years |
Whiskey Statements; Donald Trump's Favorite Historical Figures Video; Jimmy announces his limited edition St. Patrick's Day merchandise; Tonight Show This, But That (special appearance by Nick Jonas and the Colonel D. B. Kelly Pipes & Drums Band); The Tonight Show Triple Thru-Et Challenge (Nick Jonas & Adrienne Warren); Nick Jonas and Adrienne Warren perform "The Next Five Minutes" from The Last Five Years
| 2109 | March 17, 2025 | Michael Shannon, Leslie Bibb, Jonathan Roumie | Nick Thune |
Trump Bracket; Jimmy performs an original song for St. Patrick's Day; Tonight Show Trivia Night
| 2110 | March 18, 2025 | John Legend, Bill Burr | John Legend featuring Black Thought |
Astronaut Statements; Warning Signs; Tonight Show WePost; Google Translate Songs (John Legend); John Legend feat. Black Thought and The Roots perform "Used to Love U"
| 2111 | March 19, 2025 | Eva Longoria, Katt Williams, Stephen Graham | Dove Cameron |
Yale Basketball Signs; Tariq, Questlove, and Higgins list their NCAA March Madness brackets; Tonight Show News & Improved; Jimmy congratulates the St. John's Red Storm on winning the Big East men's basketball tournament; Any Answer Wins!; Dove Cameron performs "Too Much"
| 2112 | March 20, 2025 | Selena Gomez & Benny Blanco, Elizabeth Olsen | Bob Mould |
Matthew Reed; University Advertisements; NCAA March Madness Excuse Generator; Disney Live-Action Remake Actors; The Roots discuss 1923; Thank You Notes; True Confessions (Selena Gomez & Benny Blanco); Jimmy tries out Selena's favorite snow cone flavor; Bob Mould performs "When Your Heart is Broken"
| 2113 | March 24, 2025 | Nikki Glaser, Randall Park, Bozoma Saint John | Nathaniel Rateliff & the Night Sweats |
Statue Quotes; Jimmy recaps the week; Tonight Show Spring Break Do's and Don’ts (Nikki Glaser); Tonight Show Polls; Randall Park performs a hip-hop song with The Roots; Nathaniel Rateliff & the Night Sweats perform "South of Here"
| 2114 | March 25, 2025 | Naomi Watts, Tom Segura, Marcus Mumford | Mumford & Sons |
Jimmy gets a text from Trump's cabinet; Trump Group Texts; Apple Watch with Camera Commercial; Tariq and Questlove (as Trash Knuckles) performs "Metal in the Cheese"; Tonight Show WePost; Naomi Watts brings out Bing from The Friend; Jimmy gives a lengthy introduction to Mumford & Sons; Mumford & Sons performs "Rushmere"
| 2115 | March 26, 2025 | Ed Sheeran, Ncuti Gatwa | Penn & Teller |
Politician Emojis; Steven Richter; Jimmy performs a hip-hop duet with an audience member about Purdue University; Ford Motor Service Commercial; Ed Sheeran performs "Old Phone" for Jimmy; Jimmy and Ed Sheeran demonstrate a looping station for "Shape of You"
| 2116 | March 27, 2025 | Paul Rudd, Matt Bomer | Charley Crockett |
Donald Trump Mispronunciations; Diners, Drive-Ins and Dives; Jimmy crowd surfs into the audience; Tonight Show Soap Opera Interview (Paul Rudd); Charley Crockett performs "Easy Money"
| 2117 | March 31, 2025 | Jack Black, Britt Lower | Yandel |
Donald Trump Campaign Slogans; Higgins mispronounces politicians; Owen Cassidy; "The March Madness Song" (Dion Flynn); Jimmy recaps the month; Minecraft Claw Machine Challenge (Jack Black & Jason Momoa); Jack Black comes out with a guitar solo; Britt Lower performs the Severance theme song; Yandel performs "PUÑO DE TITO"

=== April ===
| No. | Original release date | Guest(s) | Musical/entertainment guest(s) |
|---|---|---|---|
| 2118 | April 1, 2025 | Kevin Bacon, Amanda Peet, Louis McCartney | Preacher Lawson |
Tonight Show News Smash; Business Statements; Tonight Show WePost; First Drafts of Rock (Kevin Bacon); Jimmy gives Louis McCartney pizza from Ceres
| 2119 | April 2, 2025 | Michael B. Jordan & Ryan Coogler, Olivia Munn, Bon Iver | Wet Leg |
Donald Trump Statements; Kaleid-o-bility!; Longest Speeches Ever; Jimmy plays a voicemail from Bon Iver's neighbor; Wet Leg performs "catch these fists"
| 2120 | April 3, 2025 | Elton John & Brandi Carlile, Hailee Steinfeld | Perfume Genius |
Jimmy re-mixes Donald Trump's Liberation Day speech; The Tonight Show Stock Watch; Temu Commercial; Jimmy recaps the differences between Mike Waltz and Tim Walz; Goldbinky: No Time to Cry; TikTok/OnlyFans Merger Statements; Password (Elton John & Jimmy Fallon Vs. Hailee Steinfeld & Brandi Carlile); Perfume Genius performs "It's a Mirror"
| 2121 | April 7, 2025 | Adam Levine, Bella Ramsey, Sam Nivola | Tina Friml |
Donald Trump sings "A Spoonful of Tariffs"; Walmart and Costco Advertisements; Congressmen/women Quotes; The Last of Us Rap Recap (Bella Ramsey)
| 2122 | April 8, 2025 | Gigi Hadid, Triple H | Ca7riel & Paco Amoroso |
Coming Up on CNBC; Tonight Show Pie Charts; Politician Quotes; Hotel Statements; Chicken Jockey; Ed Sheeran and Jimmy performed on the 50th Street subway station below 30 Rockefeller Plaza; the crew do shoutouts; Gigi Hadid gives Jimmy a basket of clothes from Guest in Residence; Jimmy shows footage of Triple H as "Jean-Paul Levesque"; Ca7riel & Paco Amoroso perform "El Día del Amigo"
| 2123 | April 9, 2025 | Rami Malek, Jason Isaacs, Zarna Garg | Warren Zeiders |
The American iPhone Commercial; Tonight Show Popular Mathematics; Paige Bueckers shows off the NCAA national championship trophy; Jason Isaacs demonstrates a variety of English accents; Warren Zeiders performs "You For A Reason"
| 2124 | April 10, 2025 | Jon Hamm, Patrick Schwarzenegger, Hannah Berner & Paige DeSorbo | Alex Warren |
Donald Trump Interview (using audio clips); Tariq is upset about things being recalled; DJ Sweatlodge; Charades (Jimmy & Jon Hamm vs. Patrick Schwarzenegger & Hannah Berner & Paige DeSorbo); Jimmy and Patrick Schwarzenegger make protein shakes; Alex Warren performs "Ordinary"
| 2125 | April 28, 2025 | Anna Kendrick, José Andrés | Role Model |
Steven Fritz; Donald Trump Flagpoles Video; Tariq laughs at Pierbattista Pizzaballa's name; Shedeur Sanders Posts; Jimmy interviews one of the Puppy Predictors in partnership with Ford; Tonight Show Song Scramble (Anna Kendrick); Martha Stewart crashes José Andrés' interview; Role Model performs "Sally, When the Wine Runs Out" with a cameo by Bowen Yang
| 2126 | April 29, 2025 | Jeremy Renner, Mary Lynn Rajskub | Nimesh Patel |
Trump Cabinet Texts; Trent Smith & Associate; Tonight Show WePost; Jimmy interviews one of the Puppy Predictors in partnership with Ford; Jeremy Renner brings out his emotional support animals
| 2127 | April 30, 2025 | Vince Vaughn, Adam DeVine, Chase Sui Wonders | Zach Top |
Big Tech CEO Quotes; Jimmy recaps the month; Jimmy interviews one of the Puppy Predictors in partnership with Ford; Zach Top performs "I Never Lie"

=== May ===
| No. | Original release date | Guest(s) | Musical/entertainment guest(s) |
|---|---|---|---|
| 2128 | May 1, 2025 | Rory McIlroy, Penn Badgley | Tunde Adebimpe + Thee Black Boltz |
Jimmy checks in with Penn Badgley at the top of the program; Kentucky Derby Sponsor Slogans; White House Wire Headlines; Air! Commercial; Quinta Brunson crash the show to promote her hosting gig on Saturday Night Live; Puppy Predictors: 2025 Kentucky Derby Edition (in partnership with Ford); Jimmy and Rory McIlroy chip golf balls into washing machines; Tunde Adebimpe + Thee Black Boltz perform "Somebody New"
| 2129 | May 5, 2025 | David Spade, Kristin Cavallari | Iván Cornejo |
Doll Quotes; Donald Trump Audio; Glenn Moore; Higgins mispronounces Star Wars characters; Tonight Show News & Improved; Tonight Show Do Not Play; Jimmy and Kristin Cavallari work out with jumping shoes; Ivan Cornejo performs "Me Prometí"
| 2130 | May 6, 2025 | Nate Bargatze, Lorraine Bracco | Shakira featuring Wyclef Jean |
Jimmy comes out in André 3000's outfit from the 2025 Met Gala; Melania Trump Statements; Hollywood Studio Responses; Pharmacy Quotes; Vatican Smoke Colors; Tonight Show WePost; Jimmy takes a photo with Nate Bargatze and a cardboard cutout of Tiger Woods; Hey Robot... (Nate Bargatze); Shakira featuring Wyclef Jean perform "Hips Don't Lie"
| 2131 | May 7, 2025 | Kerry Washington, Josh Hartnett, Adam Duritz | Counting Crows |
Sistine Chapel Doors Closing; Local Airport Advertisements; Tyler Alton; Presidential Mother’s Day Quotes; Fight or Flight director James Madigan joins Josh Hartnett's interview; Tonight Show Back That Track Up (Adam Duritz); Counting Crows performs "Spaceman in Tulsa"
| 2132 | May 8, 2025 | Shakira, Melissa Rivers, Erin Doherty | Joe List |
Mikey Angelo raps about mothers at the top of the program; Cardinal Statements; Donald Trump Phone Call; Less Popular Mother's Day Cards; Box of Lies (Shakira)
| 2133 | May 12, 2025 | Sofía Vergara, Michael McKean, Maren Morris | Maren Morris |
Donald Trump Acronyms; Peter Bressler; Pope Leo XIV Signs; Matthew Farnham; Jimmy and Tariq perform a hip-hop duet about Sofía Vergara's name; Jimmy gives the audience copies of Questlove's new documentary Sly Lives! (aka The Burden of Black Genius); Tonight Show Lookalikes; Sofía Vergara gives Jimmy a quiz on Colombian words and phrases; Maren Morris performs "Too Good"
| 2134 | May 13, 2025 | Blake Shelton, Desi Lydic | Blake Shelton |
Cody Bigelow; Congressmen Quotes; Mike Fisher; Usher/Lil Jon/DJ Khaled Phone Call; Tonight Show WePost; Jimmy gives the audience copies of his new book; Best Friends Challenge (Blake Shelton); Blake Shelton performs "Texas"
| 2135 | May 14, 2025 | Salma Hayek Pinault, Mel B | Amyl and the Sniffers |
Donald Trump Mispronunciations; New Netflix Titles; Tonight Show Google Autofails; Crazy Bugs (Salma Hayek Pinault & Alie Ward); Salma Hayek Pinault demonstrates modeling to Jimmy; Mel B walks down the aisle with an audience member and tosses a bouquet into the audience; Amyl and the Sniffers perform "Tiny Bikini"
| 2136 | May 15, 2025 | The Weeknd, Young Mazino, Adam Goldstein | The Weeknd |
Tariq corrects Jimmy on misspellings and perform a duet; Jimmy and The Weeknd surprise college graduates at Fordham University; Tonight Show Who Said It?; The Weeknd promotes Mission: Impossible – The Final Reckoning; Young Mazino performs a guitar solo; Adam Goldstein gives Jimmy the first pilot's jacket for the 2028 Summer Olympics; The Weeknd performs a medley of songs
| 2137 | May 19, 2025 | Tom Cruise, Milly Alcock | Shakira |
Tariq confronts Jimmy over doing stunts; Donald Trump Audio; Siri and Alexa get into a catfight; Tonight Show Trivia Night; What's Behind Me? (Tom Cruise); Tom Cruise and Jimmy Fallon surprise an audience member with a military reunion; Tom Cruise gives the audience tickets to see Mission: Impossible – The Final Reckoning; Shakira performs "Antología"
| 2138 | May 20, 2025 | Jessica Biel, Simon Pegg, Isabela Merced | Sombr |
Knicks vs. Pacers Promo; IKEA Promo; Danforth W. Westingame III; Tonight Show WePost; Slow Motion Charades (Jimmy & Jessica Biel vs. Simon Pegg & Isabela Merced); Sombr performs "Back to Friends"
| 2139 | May 21, 2025 | Ana de Armas, Pom Klementieff, Jin | Jin |
Congressmen/women Quotes; Tonight Show This, But That (special appearance by Simon Pegg); Tonight Show Whisper Challenge (Ana de Armas); Jin interviews Jimmy; Jin performs "Don't Say You Love Me"
| 2140 | May 22, 2025 | Shaquille O'Neal, Hayley Atwell | Dasha |
Audience made up of servicemen/women; Military Recruitment Ads; Space Force Anniversary Video; Uber Eats Commercial; Starbucks/Dunkin' Donuts Summer Menu Ads; Jimmy, The Roots, Tom Cruise, and the cast of Mission: Impossible – The Final Reckoning performed an a cappella version of "Theme from Mission: Impossible"; Tonight Show Trick or Seat (Shaquille O'Neal); Shaquille O'Neal gives Jimmy pairs of Reebok sneakers; Dasha performs "Not at This Party"

=== June ===
| No. | Original release date | Guest(s) | Musical/entertainment guest(s) |
|---|---|---|---|
| 2141 | June 2, 2025 | Dakota Johnson, Jonathan Groff | Matt Berninger |
Elon's Excuse Generator; Stranger Things 5 Trailer; John Auff; Tesla Cybertruck Commercial; Tariq is upset about things being recalled; Jimmy prank calls various businesses with Dakota Johnson; Tonight Show Fast Forward (Dakota Johnson); Matt Berninger performs "Bonnet of Pins"
| 2142 | June 3, 2025 | Tyler Perry & Taraji P. Henson, Brianne Howey, Owen Cooper | Turnstile |
JetBlue & United Announcement Video; Snack Food Warning Labels; Jimmy recaps the Trump administration; Tonight Show Connections; Owen Cooper gives Jimmy a basket of British snacks; Turnstile performs a medley of songs
| 2143 | June 4, 2025 | Desmond Bane, Annie Murphy, Benson Boone | Benson Boone |
Jimmy checks in with Benson Boone at the top of the program; Congressman/woman Quotes; Tonight Show Polls; Nintendo of America SVP Nate Bihldorff demonstrates the Nintendo Switch 2 with Annie Murphy; Benson Boone does a flip-off on Jimmy's desk; Benson Boone performs "Momma Song"
| 2144 | June 5, 2025 | Sydney Sweeney; Andrew Rannells & Nick Kroll | Liz Glazer |
Slow-Motion Job Interview (Andrew Rannells & Nick Kroll); Tonight Show One Breath Trivia (Jimmy & Sydney Sweeney vs. Andrew Rannells & Nick Kroll); Jimmy and Andrew Rannells put on a surprise performance for Nick Kroll's birthday
| 2145 | June 9, 2025 | Robert De Niro, "Weird Al" Yankovic | Arcade Fire |
Trump Teslur Commercial; Donald Trump Interview (using audio clips); Questlove and Tariq perform a crunchy jam song; Jimmy acknowledges the death of Sly Stone; Who knew? (special appearance by Walton Goggins in partnership with Walmart); Tonight Show Topical Karaoke; Jimmy narrows down Robert De Niro movies with the audience; Arcade Fire performs "Circle of Trust"; Note: Instead of saying the episode number at the beginning, Questlove said "S-N-Y!"
| 2146 | June 10, 2025 | Orlando Bloom, Antonia Gentry, Edward St Aubyn | Yakov Smirnoff |
Donald Trump Audio; Elon Musk and Donald Trump sing "Somebody That I Used to Know"; New iPhone Feature; Tonight Show WePost (special appearance by Coco Gauff); Orlando Bloom brings his dog Biggie Smalls
| 2147 | June 11, 2025 | Gerard Butler, Michelle Monaghan | MARINA |
Jimmy recaps Elon and Trump's feud with popular songs; Stewart Richmond; Donald Trump Musical Numbers; Hank Oliver; Jimmy gives a shout-out to Mo Willems; Tapple (Gerard Butler & Michelle Monaghan); MARINA performs "I <3 You"
| 2148 | June 12, 2025 | Julianne Moore, Marc Maron, Jurnee Smollett | Tommy Brennan |
Father's Day Cards; Trump Military Parade Festivities Map; Jimmy breaks down the military parade by the numbers; Jimmy gives a shout-out to Mo Willems
| 2149 | June 16, 2025 | Javier Bardem, Carrie Coon | John Crist |
Will Sedmond; Donald Trump mispronounces Kananaskis; Jimmy recaps Trump's schedule; Tonight Show Sponsors; Tonight Show Mute! (Carrie Coon)
| 2150 | June 17, 2025 | Uma Thurman, Lee Byung-hun, HAIM | HAIM |
Jimmy checks in with HAIM at the top of the program; In-N-Out Burger and Waffle House Ads; 23andMe DNA Profiles; Tonight Show WePost; HAIM performs "Down to Be Wrong"
| 2151 | June 19, 2025 | Priyanka Chopra Jonas, Lionel Boyce | Keke Palmer |
Stephen Miller Responses; Kool-Aid Commercial; The Tonight Show Stock Watch; Denworth's Ad; Questlove and Tariq re-enact a scene from Love Island; Blended News Stories; Tonight Show Blow Your Mind (Priyanka Chopra Jonas); Priyanka Chopra Jonas teaches Jimmy stunt choreography; Keke Palmer performs a medley of songs
| 2152 | June 23, 2025 | Charlize Theron, Jensen Ackles | Lukas Nelson |
Heat Wave Ads; Donald Trump Audio; What Donald Trump Sees on the Teleprompter; Frisbee Trick Shots (special appearance by Brad Pitt); Tonight Show Battle of the Instant Songwriters; Lukas Nelson performs "American Romance"
| 2153 | June 24, 2025 | Scarlett Johansson, Jay Pharoah | Frankie Grande |
Weather App; F-This! Trailer; Jerome Davis; Tonight Show Cold Takes; Tonight Show WePost; Jimmy announces his new summer clothing line with Alex Mill; Scarlett Johansson chooses which of her co-stars would survive a dinosaur encounter; Jay Pharoah does celebrity impressions reacting to the heat wave; Tonight Show Mad Lib Theater (Scarlett Johansson); Frankie Grande performs a medley of songs
| 2154 | June 25, 2025 | Jonathan Bailey, Abby Elliott, Brandy & Monica, Michael Ruhlman | N/A |
New York Mayor Statements; Senator Quotes; Tonight Show Audience Suggestion Box (Jurassic Park dinosaurs with opera sounds, Jimmy takes a selfie, Abbatar, James Poyner’s audition for the next James Bond, the audience dances to "Fireball", F1 trailer; the Dallas Cowboys Cheerleaders dance to Thunderstruck; Jonathan Bailey teaches Jimmy how to do a dramatic turn; Tonight Show Omelet Cook-Off (Michael Ruhlman)
| 2155 | June 26, 2025 | Jeremy Allen White, Karol G | Karol G |
Summer Movie & TV Poll Results; Jimmy and Tariq do Love Island style talking heads; Tonight Show News & Improved; Tonight Show Freezer Secrets (Jeremy Allen White); Karol G shows Jimmy how to dance; Karol G performs "Papasito"

=== July ===
| No. | Original release date | Guest(s) | Musical/entertainment guest(s) |
|---|---|---|---|
| 2156 | July 14, 2025 | David Corenswet, Lewis Capaldi | Lewis Capaldi |
Summer Movie & TV Poll Results; Tonight Show Connections; Tonight Show 30 Seconds to... (David Corenswet); Lewis Capaldi performs "Survive"
| 2157 | July 15, 2025 | Russell Wilson; Lola Tung, Gavin Casalegno and Christopher Briney | Clipse |
Barack Obama (Dion Flynn); Ketchup Commercials; Jimmy and Tariq discuss Bluey characters; Tonight Show WePost; Tonight Show Put It On a Cracker; Clipse performs "The Birds Don't Sing"
| 2158 | July 16, 2025 | Rachel Brosnahan, Ronny Chieng, Dave Portnoy | Mandal |
Donald Trump Audio; Anonymous Source; Tonight Show Blinded By the Mic (Rachel Brosnahan); Dave Portnoy brings out his dogs Miss Peaches and Pete the Beagle
| 2159 | July 17, 2025 | Natasha Lyonne, Bobby Flay | Olivia Dean |
Donald Trump sings "Let It Go" (using audio clips); Cody Bigelow; Elon Musk Survey Results; Tough Guys Movie Trailer; Tonight Show Who Said It?; Catchphrase (Jimmy & Natasha Lyonne Vs. Tariq & Bobby Flay); Olivia Dean performs "Nice to Each Other"
| 2160 | July 21, 2025 | Adam Sandler, Sabrina Ionescu | Jessie Murph |
Donald Trump Statements; Statue Quotes; Open Champion Scottie Scheffler crashes the monologue and takes a selfie with Jimmy; Tonight Show Go On, Git!; Jimmy quizzes Sabrina Ionescu on her starting five in various categories; Jessie Murph performs "1965"; Note: In addition to saying the episode number at the beginning, Questlove said "Jammin' it to the 2160!"
| 2161 | July 22, 2025 | Pete Davidson, Kid Cudi | Kid Cudi |
Donald Trump Announcement; Subway Advertisement; Questlove and Tariq re-enact a scene from Love Island; Chris Paul crashes the monologue; Tonight Show WePost; Axe Me Anything (Pete Davidson); Kid Cudi performs "Grave"; Note: Instead of saying the episode number at the beginning, Questlove said "All aboard!" in tribute to the late Ozzy Osbourne.
| 2162 | July 23, 2025 | Anthony Mackie, Mamie Gummer, Robert Klein | GHOST |
The Blame Game; Jimmy recaps the week; James is a contestant on Are You My First?; Tonight Show Lookalikes; GHOST performs "Lachryma"
| 2163 | July 24, 2025 | Lupita Nyong'o, J Balvin | J Balvin & Gilberto Santa Rosa |
Congressman/woman Statements; MacLeod Course Ad; Tonight Show Trivia Night; Pictionary (Jimmy & Lupita Nyong'o Vs. Tariq & J Balvin); J Balvin and Gilberto Santa Rosa perform "Misterio"
| 2164 | July 28, 2025 | Lindsay Lohan, Benny Safdie | The Head and the Heart |
Jimmy recaps the week; The Pod Pod; Do Not Read; Tonight Show Whisper Challenge (Lindsay Lohan); The Head and the Heart performs "Beg, Steal, Borrow"
| 2165 | July 29, 2025 | Sam Rockwell, Alison Brie | Drew Dunn |
Hannah Berner and Paige DeSorbo fill in for Steve Higgins as announcers; Heat Wave Product Ads; Donald Trump and JD Vance Statements; Trainwreck: Promptergate; Tonight Show Face-2-Face (Jimmy & Alison Brie Vs. Tariq & Sam Rockwell with Hannah Berner and Paige DeSorbo)
| 2166 | July 30, 2025 | Nicole Scherzinger, Hasan Minhaj, Morgan Spector | PinkPantheress |
Hannah Berner and Paige DeSorbo fill in for Steve Higgins as announcers; Donald Trump Audio; Barack Obama (Dion Flynn); Tonight Show Guess the Relationship; Nicole Scherzinger performs a long note from Sunset Boulevard; PinkPantheress performs a medley of songs
| 2167 | July 31, 2025 | Spike Lee, Zane Lowe | Olivia Carter |
Tariq fills in for Steve Higgins as announcer; Donald Trump Announcement; Tariq explains Donald Trump's relationship with Jerome Powell; Jimmy recaps the month; Tonight Show One Answer Only; Tonight Show This, But That; Jimmy quizzes Zane Lowe on song picks for random scenarios

=== August ===
| No. | Original release date | Guest(s) | Musical/entertainment guest(s) |
|---|---|---|---|
| 2168 | August 4, 2025 | Chris Pratt, Rose Byrne, mgk | mgk |
Extreme Makeover: White House Edition; Focus Group; Jimmy creates a new snack with a tomato; Tonight Show Telestrations (Chris Pratt, Rose Byrne, and MGK); MGK performs a medley of songs
| 2169 | August 5, 2025 | Lin-Manuel Miranda, Jordan Klepper | Chance the Rapper |
Dean Blake; Dan the Cameraman; Smoke Warning Scale; Jimmy Fallon, Lin-Manuel Miranda & The Roots sing a medley of songs with classroom instruments; Lin-Manuel Miranda announces the theatrical release of Hamilton; Tonight Show Back That Track Up; Chance the Rapper performs "Tree"
| 2170 | August 6, 2025 | Seth Rogen, Heidi Klum | Derrick Stroup |
The Tonight Show Stock Watch; Wednesday Promo; Norwegian Resident Quotes; Tonight Show WePost; Jimmy announces the return of Fallon Book Club; Tonight Show Toasts
| 2171 | August 7, 2025 | Jonas Brothers, Greg Gutfeld | Good Charlotte |
Mall Store Quotes; Freakiest Friday; Jimmy and Tariq swap bodies; AMC Theatres Short Ads; Higgins mispronounces Netflix shows; Disney/WWE Promo; Tonight Show News & Improved; Tonight Show Hot Wizard Hotline (Jonas Brothers); Jimmy gives a toast to the Jonas Brothers with ants on a log and champagne; Good Charlotte performs "I Don't Work Here Anymore"
| 2172 | August 11, 2025 | Helen Mirren and Pierce Brosnan, Cristin Milioti, Matthew Berry | Bonnie McFarlane |
Statue Quotes; Tonight Show Polls; Jimmy names a tomato after Demi Lovato; Helen Mirren and Pierce Brosnan sample salsa made with Jimmy's tomato
| 2173 | August 12, 2025 | Austin Butler, Judd Apatow | Royel Otis |
Taylor Swift News Update; Tariq criticizes Jimmy's conspiracy theory about Taylor Swift's twelfth album; Donald Trump Alaska Announcement; Tonight Show Sponsors; Freestylin' with the Roots; Judd Apatow shares behind-the-scenes footage from The 40-Year-Old Virgin; Royel Otis perform "Say Something"
| 2174 | August 13, 2025 | John Cena, Jesse Tyler Ferguson | Goose |
Jimmy breaks down the 2025 Russia–United States Summit; Ultimate Fighting Championship Capitol Hill; Jimmy acknowledges Higgins' birthday; Fallon Book Club; Wild Guess (John Cena); John Cena shows up in his Peacemaker costume; Goose perform "Madalena"
| 2175 | August 14, 2025 | Bob Odenkirk, Margaret Qualley | Pedrito Martinez Group featuring Bill Murray |
Jimmy checks in with his guests at the top of the program; Saskatchewan Songs; Conor Marshall; Fallon Book Club; Bob Odenkirk fights Jimmy; Margaret Qualley plays truth or dare with Jimmy; Catchphrase (Amaya Espinal & Bryan Arenales Vs. Nicolas "Nic" Vansteenberghe & Olandria Carthen); Pedrito Martinez Group featuring Bill Murray perform "Ilusión Óptica"

=== September ===
| No. | Original release date | Guest(s) | Musical/entertainment guest(s) |
|---|---|---|---|
| 2176 | September 2, 2025 | Jessica Chastain; Paul Mescal & Josh O'Connor, Sabrina Impacciatore | Arthur Hanlon, Carlos Vives & Goyo |
Donald Trump Message; Starbucks Fall Menu Ad; Jimmy participates in a KPop Demon Hunters sing-along with an audience member; Jimmy shows off a cucumber from his garden; Tonight Show Connections; Jessica Chastain samples a sushi roll made with Jimmy's cucumber; Arthur Hanlon, Carlos Vives and Goyo perform "Goodbye"
| 2177 | September 3, 2025 | Steve Buscemi, David Byrne, Malin Akerman | David Byrne |
CDC FAQ’s; Conrad Peck; Any Answer Wins!; David Byrne performs "What Is The Reason For It?" at Rough Trade in the Comcast Building
| 2178 | September 4, 2025 | LL Cool J, Shai Gilgeous-Alexander, Riley Green | Riley Green |
Jimmy and Questlove play paper football at the top of the program (special appearance by Saquon Barkley); the Dallas Cowboys Cheerleaders perform a special routine in place of the opening sequence; Coors Light Ad; Jimmy and Tariq perform a song about football; Jimmy recaps the week; Tonight Show Superlatives; Jimmy gifts an audience member a pair of Converse; Riley Green performs "Make It Rain"; Note: Instead of saying the episode number at the beginning, Questove said "Football!"
| 2179 | September 8, 2025 | Fred Armisen, Olivia Cooke, Debbie Gibson | Offset featuring JID |
US Open Announcement; Donald Trump Grunts; Donald Trump Mispronunciations; The Conjuring: KPop Demon Hunters; Carlos Alcaraz (Fred Armisen) and Aryna Sabalenka crash the monologue; Tonight Show Battle of the Instant Songwriters; Fred Armisen impersonates the drummer from "I'm Coming Out"; Debbie Gibson performs "Shake Your Love" with sprinkles; Offset featuring JID, Drowning Pool, and Bnyx performs "Bodies"
| 2180 | September 9, 2025 | Steve Martin, Martin Short & Selena Gomez; Michelle Dockery | Karan Aujla |
Jimmy checks in with Steve Martin, Martin Short and Selena Gomez at the top of the program; Politician Quotes; Donald Trump Audio; Scott Bessent/Bill Pulte Statements; Mark Duncan; Tonight Show WePost; Catchphrase (Jimmy & Selena Gomez Vs. Steve Martin & Martin Short); Jimmy gives the audience tickets for Downton Abbey: The Grand Finale; Karan Aujla performs a medley of songs
| 2181 | September 10, 2025 | Stephen Curry, Billy Crudup, Steven Bartlett | Kali Uchis |
Congressman Quotes; Hims Ad; James Poyser reads cue cards he has never seen before; Jimmy plays clues from Ed Sheeran songs; the Savannah Bananas perform a song-and-dance routine for Jimmy; Stephen Curry Shows Off an Embarrassing Photo of Jimmy (in partnership with Pixel 10 Pro Fold); Kali Uchis featuring Ravyn Lenae performs "Cry About It"
| 2182 | September 11, 2025 | Reese Witherspoon, Mark Ronson | Gianmarco Soresi |
JD Vance Interview (using audio clips of boy band songs); Restaurant Chain Statements; Tonight Show #hashtags: #MyTeacherIsWeird; Tonight Show True Confessions (Reese Witherspoon, Mark Ronson)
| 2183 | September 15, 2025 | Keegan-Michael Key, Cade Cunningham | Common featuring Bilal & The Roots |
Taping at the Detroit Opera House in Michigan; Jimmy and The Roots mix up the cold open; Jimmy performs a song about Detroit; Jimmy and Higgins learn how to kick a field goal at Ford Field (in partnership with Ford; special appearance by Jim Farley); Lip Sync Battle (Keegan-Michael Key); Jimmy pitches an invention to Newlab; Keegan-Michael Key quizzes Jimmy on how to pronounce Detroit streets and gives food from Slows Bar BQ; Jimmy and the Roots perform "My Girl"; the Detroit Pistons dancers surprises Cade Cunningham; Jimmy and Jim Farley test a Ford Bronco Badlands Sasquatch; Common featuring Bilal, Sintex, and The Roots perform "The Light"; Aidan Hutchinson makes a surprise appearance at the end; Note: Instead of saying the episode number at the beginning, Questove said "What up doe!"
| 2184 | September 16, 2025 | Sylvester Stallone, Marlon Wayans | Mariah the Scientist |
Royal Family Statements; TikTok Quotes; The Tonight Show Stock Watch; Jimmy recaps The Summer I Turned Pretty to the tune of "Joy to the World"; Jimmy announces his appearance on the cover of Adweek; Cardi B crashes the show to announce her new album and tour; Freestylin' with the Roots; Sylvester Stallone chooses between his movies; Mariah the Scientist performs a medley of songs
| 2185 | September 17, 2025 | Jason Bateman, Mel Robbins | Martha Wainwright |
Spirit Airlines Apology Ad; Tariq explains the LIRR strike; Pickleball Golf Labubu Death Challenge (Jason Bateman); Jimmy gives the audience copies of The Let Them Theory; Martha Wainwright performs "Save the Country"
| 2186 | September 18, 2025 | Jude Law, Tom Llamas, Jonathan Groff | The cast of Just in Time |
Jimmy checks in with Jude Law at the top of the program; Jimmy's monologue gets censored; Tonight Show Pie Charts; Tonight Show WePost; Jimmy and Tom Llamas gift each other vinyl records; the cast of Just in Time performs "Mack the Knife"
| 2187 | September 21, 2025 | Matthew McConaughey, Karl-Anthony Towns, Eric Church | Eric Church |
Broloft Ad; Jimmy performs a song about NFL coaches; Tonight Show Superlatives; Jimmy jumps through a field goal made of Cheetos and white Kit Kats; Matthew McConaughey reads an excerpt from Poems & Prayers; Eric Church performs "Johnny"
| 2188 | September 22, 2025 | Sean Penn, Zachary Quinto, Fredrik Backman | Lang Lang |
Henry Collins; Jimmy’s monologue gets interrupted by graphics; Starbucks Ads; Tariq is upset about things being recalled; Lang Lang performs a medley of songs
| 2189 | September 23, 2025 | The Cast of One Battle After Another, Kate McKinnon | Ian Lara |
Jimmy can't escape ROSÉ at the top of the program; Donald Trump Audio; Tariq performs a song about KPop Demon Hunters; Charades (Jimmy & ROSÉ Vs. Tariq & Kate McKinnon)
| 2190 | September 24, 2025 | Mark Wahlberg, Kim Kardashian | Lola Young |
Jimmy checks in with Kim Kardashian at the top of the program; What Donald Trump Sees on the Teleprompter; Law & Order Premiere Promo; Tonight Show #hashtags: #AddAWordMakeASongFall; Password (Mark Wahlberg & Jimmy Fallon Vs. Tariq & Kim Kardashian); Lola Young performs "Spiders"
| 2191 | September 29, 2025 | Mariah Carey, Bozoma Saint John | Mariah Carey featuring Anderson .Paak |
Government Shutdown Message; Donald Trump Audio; Tonight Show Lookalikes; Famous Face-Off (Tariq & Mariah Carey Vs. Jimmy & Bozoma Saint John); Mariah Carey plays tracks from her unreleased 90's album; Mariah Carey featuring Anderson .Paak and The Roots performs "Play This Song"
| 2192 | September 30, 2025 | Dwayne Johnson, Henry Winkler, FINNEAS & Ashe | The Favors |
Congressmen/women Quotes; Jimmy recaps the month; Jimmy engages in a pillow fight with Dwayne Johnson and Mark Kerr; The Favors perform "Home Sweet Home"

=== October ===
| No. | Original release date | Guest(s) | Musical/entertainment guest(s) |
|---|---|---|---|
| 2193 | October 1, 2025 | Doja Cat, Druski | Blood Orange |
Doja Cat co-hosts the broadcast; Statue Quotes; Tariq and Doja Cat re-enact a scene from The Real Housewives of Miami; Tonight Show #hashtags: #MyRoommateIsWeird (with Doja Cat); the crew give elevator pitches for Vie; Tonight Show Song Scramble (Doja Cat); Doja Cat demonstrates an ‘80s dance move; Tonight Show Real or Fake (Doja Cat); Blood Orange performs "Somewhere in Between"; Note: Instead of saying the episode number in the beginning, Questlove said "D-O-J-A".
| 2194 | October 2, 2025 | Mark Ruffalo, Addison Rae, Chase Infiniti | Addison Rae |
Donald Trump's Excuse Generator; Meta AI Recommended Ads; DumbPhone; Dr. Will Brainard; Tonight Show WeMix; Jimmy and Mark Ruffalo dunk their heads in ice water; Addison Rae performs "Diet Pepsi"
| 2195 | October 6, 2025 | Taylor Swift, Keri Russell | The Format |
Jimmy re-enacts "The Fate of Ophelia" at the top of the program; Questlove and Tariq urge Jimmy to skip over to Taylor Swift's interview; Taylor Swift breaks down the inspiration behind The Life of a Showgirl; The Format performs "Holy Roller"; Note: Instead of saying the episode number in the beginning, Questlove said "She's here!".
| 2196 | October 7, 2025 | Jennifer Lopez; Ejae, Audrey Nuna & Rei Ami | Ejae, Audrey Nuna & Rei Ami |
Airport Statements; Donald Trump Audio; Jimmy breaks down Trump's schedule; Tonight Show News & Improved; Tonight Show Singing Whisper Challenge (Jennifer Lopez); Ejae, Audrey Nuna & Rei Ami give the audience customized KPop Demon Hunters merchandise; Jimmy announces the Platinum certification of the KPop Demon Hunters soundtrack; Ejae, Audrey Nuna & Rei Ami perform "Golden"
| 2197 | October 8, 2025 | Jared Leto, Paige DeSorbo | Hayley Williams |
Duolingo Trump Edición; Questlove and Tariq re-enact a scene from The Real Housewives of Salt Lake City; Tonight Show #hashtags: #ThingsIdRatherDoThanGoApplePicking; Hey Robot… (Jared Leto); Hayley Williams performs "True Believer"
| 2198 | October 9, 2025 | Channing Tatum, Greta Lee; Boone Hogg & Logan Jugler | Queens of the Stone Age |
Trump Nobel Prize Campaign Video; Politicians Before and After the Government Shutdown; Tariq mixes up Grey's Anatomy with other titles; Amy Poehler crashes the monologue; Tonight Show 30 Seconds to... (Channing Tatum); Boone Hogg and Logan Jugler knight Jimmy as a member of Stick Nation; Queens of the Stone Age perform a medley of songs
| Special | October 10, 2025 | Taylor Swift | N/A |
An extended cut of Taylor Swift's interview from the October 6 episode.
| 2199 | October 20, 2025 | Oscar Isaac, Malala Yousafzai | Audrey Hobert |
Jimmy breaks down Trump's schedule; George Santos (Jon Lovitz); New Monster Seasons; Tonight Show Pie Charts; Oscar Isaac performs an original song written by his son; Tonight Show Random Instrument Challenge (Oscar Isaac); Audrey Hobert performs "Sue Me"
| 2200 | October 21, 2025 | Jacob Elordi, Charlie Puth, Allen Iverson | Charlie Puth |
Jimmy checks in with Allen Iverson at the top of the program; the NBA cheerleaders perform a special routine in place of the opening sequence; Jimmy and Tariq perform a hip-hop song about NBA teams; Hundred Percent (Charlie Puth); Charlie Puth and Jimmy creates a song; Charlie Puth performs "Changes"
| 2201 | October 22, 2025 | Adam Brody, Gaten Matarazzo, Mark Messier | Courtney Barnett |
Flip or Flop or F*** It Up; Kaleid-o-bility!; Jacques Fournier; a montage of news anchors recreating the 6-7 meme; Tonight Show Connections; Gaten Matarazzo does a bracket-style game with deceased Stranger Things characters; Mark Messier gives Jimmy a custom New York Rangers jersey; Courtney Barnett performs "Stay in Your Lane"
| 2202 | October 23, 2025 | Kristen Bell, Dave Franco | Jay Jurden |
Blended News Stories; Thank You Notes; Tonight Showbotics
| 2203 | October 26, 2025 | Glen Powell, Alex Rodriguez | Florence and the Machine |
The Dallas Cowboys Cheerleaders perform a special routine in place of the opening sequence; Switch-Up; Tonight Show Superlatives; Tonight Show Go On, Git!; Beer Roulette (Glen Powell); Jimmy gives the audience tickets to see The Running Man at Dolby Cinema at AMC; Florence and the Machine performs "Sympathy Magic"
| 2204 | October 27, 2025 | James Corden, Lindsey Vonn | Big Thief |
Jimmy and Tariq discuss what they love about football; Tonight Show Who Said It?; Tonight Show 5 Seconds to Sing (James Corden); Big Thief performs "Grandmother"
| 2205 | October 28, 2025 | Liam Hemsworth, Leanne Morgan, Trae Young | Fuerza Regida |
The NBA cheerleaders perform a special routine in place of the opening sequence; Donald Trump Audio; Steve Richter; World Series Fan Signs; Higgins mispronounces NBA players; Tonight Show Sweet Sixteen (special appearance by Chris Paul); Tonight Show This, But That (special appearance by the dancers from Magic Mike Live); Tonight Show One Shot Jackpot (Trae Young); Fuerza Regida performs "Tu Sancho"
| 2206 | October 29, 2025 | Jesse Eisenberg, Brittany Snow, Jim Downey | Steve Martin & Alison Brown |
White House Halloween Party: Moments We'll Never Forget; Other Treats; Jimmy tells Questlove and Tariq a scary story (in partnership with KitchenAid); Tapple (Jesse Eisenberg and Brittany Snow); Jesse Eisenberg performs a magic trick for Jimmy; Steve Martin and Alison Brown perform "Let's Get Out of Here"

=== November ===
| No. | Original release date | Guest(s) | Musical/entertainment guest(s) |
|---|---|---|---|
| 2207 | November 3, 2025 | Jonathan Bailey, Jimmy Carr, Bianca Fernandez | I'm with Her |
Donald Trump's Excuse Generator; Frank Simmons; Jimmy reveals Jonathan Bailey as People's "Sexiest Man Alive" 2025; Jimmy gives the audience the Theragun Sense from On Brand; I’m with Her performs "Ancient Light"
| 2208 | November 4, 2025 | Rami Malek, Rachel Sennott, Julius Randle | Nick Murphy |
The NBA cheerleaders perform a special routine in place of the opening sequence; Tariq mixes up Dancing with the Stars with other titles; Jimmy announces his new Holiday Seasoning Radio channel on SiriusXM; Tonight Show Three Simple Steps; Tonight Show One Shot Jackpot (Julius Randle); Rachel Sennott analyzes Jimmy's horoscope; Julius Randle gives Jimmy a custom Minnesota Timberwolves jersey
| 2209 | November 5, 2025 | Jennifer Lawrence, Tom Felton | Daniel Caesar |
NYC Mayor Quotes; Donald Trump Interview (using audio clips); Tonight Show Nonna's Nom Noms (Captchas); Tonight Show Mute! (Jennifer Lawrence); Daniel Caesar performs "Who Knows"
| 2210 | November 6, 2025 | Sarah Snook, Mikey Day, Kyle Larson | Young Miko |
Tariq is upset about things being recalled; Thank You Notes; Sarah Snook and Jimmy try out the Tim Tam Slam; Kyle Larson brings out the NASCAR Cup Series trophy; Young Miko performs "Likey Likey"
| 2211 | November 10, 2025 | Billy Bob Thornton; Aaron Tveit, Lea Michele & Nicholas Christopher | The cast of Chess |
Senator Quotes; Jimmy performs a hip-hop duet with an audience member about Frankenstein; Tonight Show News & Improved; Tonight Show Battle of the Instant Songwriters; Aaron Tveit, Lea Michele & Nicholas Christopher demonstrate vocal warm-ups with Jimmy; the cast of Chess perform a medley of songs
| 2212 | November 11, 2025 | Miles Teller, Hannah Berner | HARDY |
Audience made up of servicemen/women; the NBA cheerleaders perform a special routine in place of the opening sequence; Military Recruitment Ads; Tonight Show on the Street; Freestylin’ with the Roots; Tonight Show One Shot Jackpot; Tonight Show Whisper Challenge; Hannah Berner challenges Jimmy to show off their calves; HARDY performs "Bottomland"
| 2213 | November 12, 2025 | Ben Stiller, Brad Paisley | Peter Revello |
Jimmy interviews the "real" Matthew McConaughey; Guthrie and Maria; Tonight Show WePost; Tonight Show Freezer Secrets (Ben Stiller); Brad Paisley performs "Lit"
| 2214 | November 13, 2025 | Jonas Brothers, Matthew Rhys, A'ja Wilson | Fiona Cauley |
Donald Trump Acronyms; Questlove and Tariq re-enact a scene from The Real Housewives of Salt Lake City; Wicked: For Good Reviews; Scott Kelly crashes the interview; Tonight Show Musical Genre Challenge (Jonas Brothers)
| 2215 | November 16, 2025 | Rosalía, DJ Khaled | Rosalía |
The Dallas Cowboys Cheerleaders perform a special routine in place of the opening sequence; NFL Announcer Sponsors; Jimmy listens to "867-5309/Jenny (Updated Version)"; Patrick the writer catches a football from atop the Comcast Building and gets hit by a passing vehicle; Tonight Show Superlatives; Jimmy and the cast of Wicked: For Good break down their characters; Tonight Show Worm-Off; Rosalía teaches Jimmy her vocal warm-ups for "La Perla"; Seductive, Insulting, or Nonsense (Rosalía); Rosalía performs "La Perla"
| 2216 | November 17, 2025 | Michelle Yeoh, Hank Azaria, Raye | Raye |
Trump's Yule Log; Trish Pickett; Tobias Niederhauser; Tonight Show Celebrity Whispers...; Michelle Yeoh gifts two Labubu dolls for Jimmy's daughters; Hank Azaria and Jimmy perform a rendition of "Prove It All Night"; Raye performs "Where Is My Husband!"
| 2217 | November 18, 2025 | Ariana Grande, Josh Hutcherson | Snocaps |
The NBA cheerleaders perform a special routine in place of the opening sequence; Corey Billingsley; The History of Duets (with Ariana Grande); Tonight Show One Shot Jackpot; Snocaps performs "Coast"
| 2218 | November 19, 2025 | Cynthia Erivo, Leslie Bibb, Tom Freston | Nora Fatehi featuring Shenseea |
Redacted Epstein Files; JetBlue Captain's Announcements; Swim Shady Statement; Cynthia Erivo ranks the top six songs from Wicked and Wicked: For Good; Nora Fatehi featuring Shenseea performs "What Do I Know? (Just A Girl)"
| 2219 | November 25, 2025 | Tim Allen, Lili Reinhart | Dusty Slay |
The NBA cheerleaders perform a special routine in place of the opening sequence; White House Turkey Facts; Jimmy breaks down Trump's schedule; the Stranger Things cast recaps the entire series in one minute; Jimmy announces the release of "Ugly Sweater" with Carter Faith; Tonight Show Tunnel Fits; Tonight Show One Shot Jackpot
| 2220 | November 26, 2025 | Denis Leary, Zoey Deutch | AVTT/PTTN |
Kroger Thanksgiving Commercial; Jimmy reads "'Twas the Night Before Thanksgiving"; Tonight Show #hashtags: #MyFamilyIsWeird; Tonight Show Wheel of Opinions (Denis Leary); AVTT/PTTN performs "Eternal Love"
| 2221 | November 27, 2025 | Ed Sheeran, Joe Keery, Philip Barantini | Brad Paisley |
Jimmy & Carter Faith's "Ugly Sweater" music video debuted at the top of the program; the Dallas Cowboys Cheerleaders perform a special routine in place of the opening sequence; Thanksgiving Seating Chart; Thank You Notes; One Shot Interview (Ed Sheeran); Brad Paisley performs "Counting Down the Days"; Note: Instead of saying the episode number at the beginning, Questlove said "Gobble, gobble!"

=== December ===
| No. | Original release date | Guest(s) | Musical/entertainment guest(s) |
|---|---|---|---|
| 2222 | December 1, 2025 | Sydney Sweeney, Tom Pelphrey | Alex G |
Zootopia 2 Promo; Tonight Show 12 Days of Christmas Sweaters; Amazon•Tonight Show Five Star Theater Challenge (in Partnership with Amazon); What's Behind Me? (Sydney Sweeney); Alex G performs "June Guitar"
| 2223 | December 2, 2025 | Amanda Seyfried, Reba McEntire, Kon Knueppel | Of Monsters and Men |
The NBA cheerleaders perform a special routine in place of the opening sequence; TSA Holiday Message; Tariq mixes up Stranger Things with other titles; Christmas Tree Lighting Guest Lineups; Tonight Show 12 Days of Christmas Sweaters; Tonight Show One Shot Jackpot (Kon Knueppel); Kon Knueppel gifts Jimmy a Charlotte Hornets jersey; Of Monsters and Men perform "Ordinary Creature"
| 2224 | December 3, 2025 | Noah Schnapp, Gwen Stefani, Amanda Gorman | Gwen Stefani |
Noah Schnapp lights the Rockefeller Center Christmas Tree; construction noises keep Donald Trump awake; Tonight Show 12 Days of Christmas Sweaters; Gwen Stefani announces her reunion with No Doubt at the Sphere and shares her timballo recipe with Jimmy; Gwen Stefani performs "Shake the Snow Globe"
| 2225 | December 4, 2025 | Walton Goggins, Natalia Dyer, Fran Lebowitz | Oz Pearlman |
Jimmy checks in with Walton Goggins at the top of the program; Calculator Wrapped; Holiday Drink Ads; Melissa McCarthy crashes the monologue; Highs and Lows; Tonight Show 12 Days of Christmas Sweaters; Oz Pearlman gives the audience high fives with Jimmy
| 2226 | December 7, 2025 | Millie Bobby Brown, Kenan Thompson | Burna Boy |
Millie Bobby Brown co-hosts the broadcast; the Dallas Cowboys Cheerleaders perform a special routine in place of the opening sequence; Stranger Things Spinoff Pitches; Millie Bobby Brown recaps her life with Taylor Swift album titles; Tonight Show 12 Days of Christmas Sweaters (with Millie Bobby Brown); Jimmy surprises Millie Bobby Brown with a special message from the cast of The Secret Lives of Mormon Wives (Mayci Neeley, Jessi Ngatikaura, Layla Taylor, and Miranda Hope); Jimmy & Millie's Road Trip; Tonight Show Pup Quiz (Millie Bobby Brown); Millie Bobby Brown gifts Eleven's bracelet from Stranger Things 2 to Jimmy; Burna Boy performs a medley of songs
| 2227 | December 8, 2025 | Mila Kunis, Zooey Deschanel, Sam Altman | St. Paul & The Broken Bones |
Kennedy Center Honors In Memoriam; Questlove and Tariq re-enact a scene from The Real Housewives of Potomac; Jerome Davis; Tonight Show 12 Days of Christmas Sweaters; Mila Kunis and Jimmy challenge each other with true and false questions; St. Paul & The Broken Bones perform "Fall Moon"
| 2228 | December 9, 2025 | Victoria Beckham, Lily Collins, Aryna Sabalenka | Jutes |
Congressmen Quotes; Updated Christmas Songs; Tonight Show 12 Days of Christmas Sweaters; Victoria Beckham crashes Lily Collins' interview; Aryna Sabalenka signs an autograph on Jimmy's forehead; Jutes performs "It Takes Two"
| 2229 | December 10, 2025 | Kate Hudson, John Stamos, Lily Allen | Laufey |
Tariq is upset about things being recalled; Tonight Show 12 Days of Christmas Sweaters; Tonight Show Stocking Stuffers; Tonight Show Blinded By the Mic (Kate Hudson); John Stamos plays a game involving references to himself in various movies and TV shows; Jimmy surprises Lily Allen with the puffer from West End Girl; Laufey performs "Lover Girl"
| 2230 | December 15, 2025 | Simu Liu, Jake Connelly, Alysa Liu | Greg Warren |
Tip or Don't Tip; Jimmy acknowledges deaths of Rob and Michele Singer Reiner; Tonight Show 12 Days of Christmas Sweaters; Tonight Show Stocking Stuffers; Alysa Liu quizzes Jimmy on figure skating; Note: Instead of saying the episode number at the beginning, Questlove said "Meathead!" in tribute to Reiner.
| 2231 | December 16, 2025 | Finn Wolfhard, Martha Stewart, Nathaniel Rateliff | Finn Wolfhard |
Stranger Things 5 Promo; Carl Schmertz; Tonight Show 12 Days of Christmas Sweaters; Tonight Show Stocking Stuffers; Finn Wolfhard gives one-word teasers for Stranger Things; Finn Wolfhard performs "Trailers After Dark"
| 2232 | December 17, 2025 | Timothée Chalamet, The Duffer Brothers | Bleachers |
Jimmy comes out as "Jimothée Fallomet"; Timothée Chalamet crashes the monologue; Holiday Cards; Wrong Jeopardy!; Tonight Show Connections; Tonight Show 12 Days of Christmas Sweaters; Tonight Show Stocking Stuffers; Beer Pong (Timothée Chalamet); Bleachers performs "Merry Christmas, Please Don't Call"
| 2233 | December 18, 2025 | Caleb McLaughlin, Carmelo Anthony | Darlene Love featuring Paul Shaffer, Little Steven & the Disciples of Soul |
Jimmy recaps the Oscars moving to YouTube with viral videos; the crew discusses Titanic; Christmas Substitutions; Tonight Show 12 Days of Christmas Sweaters; Tonight Show Stocking Stuffers (special appearance by The Rockettes); The Westminster Thrust Ensemble performs "Silent Night"; Darlene Love featuring Paul Shaffer, Little Steven & The Disciples of Soul perform "Christmas (Baby Please Come Home)" and "All Alone on Christmas"; Note: Instead of saying the episode number at the beginning, Questlove said "Fred, we love you, man!"

== Sources ==
- Official website
- Lineups at Interbridge
