= The Big Goodbye (song) =

2025 single by AJR

Single by AJR

from the EP What No One's Thinking
- Released: September 5, 2025
- Length: 5:02; 4:34 (radio edit)
- Label: AJR Productions
- Songwriters: Jack Met; Ryan Met
- Producer: Ryan Met

AJR singles chronology
| "Betty" (2025) | "The Big Goodbye" (2025) |

Music video
- "The Big Goodbye" on YouTube

"The Big Goodbye" is a song by American pop band AJR. It was released on September 5, 2025, as part of the band's extended play What No One's Thinking.

== Background ==
Following their fifth studio album, The Maybe Man (2023), AJR began crafting new material for a new EP. During the writing and production process, they encountered creative uncertainties and opted for a more emotional, honest approach. In mid-2025, they began hinting at their next single, "The Big Goodbye", by posting multiple short teaser clips on their TikTok account—generating early buzz and speculation among fans ahead of the official release. The full song was officially released on September 5, 2025, as the final track on the EP What No One's Thinking.

== Release ==
On September 5, 2025, AJR released "The Big Goodbye" through their independent label, AJR Productions. The music video premiered concurrently and features the band performing the song surrounded by surreal imagery representing emotional transition. The song was added to the set list of their Somewhere in the Sky Tour ahead of its release.

It has also been monitored on radio-play tracking sites, with OnlineRadioBox listing hundreds of U.S. stations reporting airplay additions.

== Music video ==
The official video, released alongside the single, features surreal visual sequences and thematic imagery tied to the song’s exploration of change and reflection. Scenes include the band navigating a shifting landscape of past-and-present symbols and the use of a titular "goodbye" motif.

== Personnel ==
Credits adapted from Tidal, Shazam, and Genius.

AJR

- Jack Met – lead vocals, instruments, songwriting
- Ryan Met – production, programming, songwriting, instruments
- Adam Met – background vocals, executive production

Additional musicians and vocals

- Aria Lisslo – background vocals
- Buddy Black – composer
- Leroy Van Dyke – composer
- The Fortunairs Barbershop Quartet – sampled vocals (from "The Auctioneer")

Production and engineering

- Ryan Met – recording engineer
- Jack Met – assistant producer
- Joe Zook – mixing engineer

== Charts ==
Weekly chart performance for "The Big Goodbye"
| Chart (2025–2026) | Peak position |
|---|---|
| Canada CHR/Top 40 (Billboard) | 11 |
| New Zealand Hot Singles (RMNZ) | 25 |
| US Hot Alternative Songs (Billboard) | 22 |
| US Adult Pop Airplay (Billboard) | 24 |
| US Hot Rock & Alternative Songs (Billboard) | 35 |
| US Pop Airplay (Billboard) | 24 |
