= List of The Tonight Show with Jay Leno episodes =

This is the list of episodes for The Tonight Show with Jay Leno, which aired between May 25, 1992, and May 29, 2009, with a resumed production from March 1, 2010, to February 6, 2014.

== Episodes ==
=== First incarnation (1992–2009) ===
- List of The Tonight Show with Jay Leno episodes (1992)
- List of The Tonight Show with Jay Leno episodes (1993)
- List of The Tonight Show with Jay Leno episodes (1994)
- List of The Tonight Show with Jay Leno episodes (1995)
- List of The Tonight Show with Jay Leno episodes (1996)
- List of The Tonight Show with Jay Leno episodes (1997)
- List of The Tonight Show with Jay Leno episodes (1998)
- List of The Tonight Show with Jay Leno episodes (1999)
- List of The Tonight Show with Jay Leno episodes (2000)
- List of The Tonight Show with Jay Leno episodes (2001)
- List of The Tonight Show with Jay Leno episodes (2002)
- List of The Tonight Show with Jay Leno episodes (2003)
- List of The Tonight Show with Jay Leno episodes (2004)
- List of The Tonight Show with Jay Leno episodes (2005)
- List of The Tonight Show with Jay Leno episodes (2006)
- List of The Tonight Show with Jay Leno episodes (2007)
- List of The Tonight Show with Jay Leno episodes (2008)
- List of The Tonight Show with Jay Leno episodes (2009)

=== Second incarnation (2010–2014) ===
- List of The Tonight Show with Jay Leno episodes (2010)
- List of The Tonight Show with Jay Leno episodes (2011)
- List of The Tonight Show with Jay Leno episodes (2012)
- List of The Tonight Show with Jay Leno episodes (2013–14)

== See also ==
- List of The Tonight Show episodes
