= List of The Tonight Show episodes =

The Tonight Show is an American late-night talk show that premiered on NBC on September 27, 1954. It is the world's longest-running talk show, and the longest running, regularly scheduled entertainment program in the United States. It is the third-longest-running show on NBC, after only the news and talk shows Today and Meet the Press.

Over the course of more than sixty years, The Tonight Show has undergone only minor title changes. It aired under the name Tonight for several of its early years, eventually settling on The Tonight Show after the seating of long-time host Johnny Carson in 1962. In later decades, network programmers, advertisers, and the show's announcers would refer to the show by including the name of the host; for example, since 2014 it is called The Tonight Show Starring Jimmy Fallon.

It has had six official hosts, beginning with Steve Allen (1954–1957), followed by Jack Paar (1957–1962), Johnny Carson (1962–1992), Jay Leno (1992–2009, 2010–2014), Conan O'Brien (2009–10), and Jimmy Fallon (2014–present). It has had several recurring guest hosts, a practice especially common during the Paar and Carson tenures. A total of episodes have aired.

== Episodes ==
=== Carson's tenure (1962–1992) ===
- List of The Tonight Show Starring Johnny Carson episodes (1962)
- List of The Tonight Show Starring Johnny Carson episodes (1963)
- List of The Tonight Show Starring Johnny Carson episodes (1964)
- List of The Tonight Show Starring Johnny Carson episodes (1965)
- List of The Tonight Show Starring Johnny Carson episodes (1966)
- List of The Tonight Show Starring Johnny Carson episodes (1967)
- List of The Tonight Show Starring Johnny Carson episodes (1968)
- List of The Tonight Show Starring Johnny Carson episodes (1969)
- List of The Tonight Show Starring Johnny Carson episodes (1970)
- List of The Tonight Show Starring Johnny Carson episodes (1971)
- List of The Tonight Show Starring Johnny Carson episodes (1972)
- List of The Tonight Show Starring Johnny Carson episodes (1973)
- List of The Tonight Show Starring Johnny Carson episodes (1974)
- List of The Tonight Show Starring Johnny Carson episodes (1975)
- List of The Tonight Show Starring Johnny Carson episodes (1976)
- List of The Tonight Show Starring Johnny Carson episodes (1977)
- List of The Tonight Show Starring Johnny Carson episodes (1978)
- List of The Tonight Show Starring Johnny Carson episodes (1979)
- List of The Tonight Show Starring Johnny Carson episodes (1980)
- List of The Tonight Show Starring Johnny Carson episodes (1981)
- List of The Tonight Show Starring Johnny Carson episodes (1982)
- List of The Tonight Show Starring Johnny Carson episodes (1983)
- List of The Tonight Show Starring Johnny Carson episodes (1984)
- List of The Tonight Show Starring Johnny Carson episodes (1985)
- List of The Tonight Show Starring Johnny Carson episodes (1986)
- List of The Tonight Show Starring Johnny Carson episodes (1987)
- List of The Tonight Show Starring Johnny Carson episodes (1988)
- List of The Tonight Show Starring Johnny Carson episodes (1989)
- List of The Tonight Show Starring Johnny Carson episodes (1990)
- List of The Tonight Show Starring Johnny Carson episodes (1991)
- List of The Tonight Show Starring Johnny Carson episodes (1992)

=== Leno's first tenure (1992–2009) ===
- List of The Tonight Show with Jay Leno episodes (1992–1995)
- List of The Tonight Show with Jay Leno episodes (1996–1999)
- List of The Tonight Show with Jay Leno episodes (2000–2009)

=== Leno's second tenure (2010–2014) ===
- List of The Tonight Show with Jay Leno episodes (2010)
- List of The Tonight Show with Jay Leno episodes (2011)
- List of The Tonight Show with Jay Leno episodes (2012)
- List of The Tonight Show with Jay Leno episodes (2013–14)

=== Fallon's tenure (2014–present) ===
- List of The Tonight Show Starring Jimmy Fallon episodes (2014)
- List of The Tonight Show Starring Jimmy Fallon episodes (2015)
- List of The Tonight Show Starring Jimmy Fallon episodes (2016)
- List of The Tonight Show Starring Jimmy Fallon episodes (2017)
- List of The Tonight Show Starring Jimmy Fallon episodes (2018)
- List of The Tonight Show Starring Jimmy Fallon episodes (2019)
- List of The Tonight Show Starring Jimmy Fallon episodes (2020)
- List of The Tonight Show Starring Jimmy Fallon episodes (2021)
- List of The Tonight Show Starring Jimmy Fallon episodes (2022)
- List of The Tonight Show Starring Jimmy Fallon episodes (2023)
- List of The Tonight Show Starring Jimmy Fallon episodes (2024)
- List of The Tonight Show Starring Jimmy Fallon episodes (2025)
- List of The Tonight Show Starring Jimmy Fallon episodes (2026)
