= List of The Tonight Show with Jay Leno episodes (2010) =

2010 season of American television series

- No. of episodes: 183

Release
- Original network: NBC

Season chronology
- ← Previous; 2000–09 episodes Next → 2011 episodes

This is a list of episodes for The Tonight Show with Jay Leno that aired in 2010.

== 2010 ==
=== March ===
No.	Original release date	Guest(s)	Musical/entertainment guest(s)
3776	March 1, 2010	Jamie Foxx, Lindsey Vonn	Brad Paisley
How Boring Is Alan Greenspan?, World's Tightest Pants, Jaywalking: Jay's search for a desk with help from Adam Carolla and Randy Jackson
3777	March 2, 2010	Sarah Palin, Shaun White	Adam Lambert
Headlines
3778	March 3, 2010	Chelsea Handler, Apolo Ohno	Avril Lavigne
Battle Of The Celebrity All-Stars With The Cast Of Jersey Shore
3779	March 4, 2010	Matthew McConaughey, Brett Favre	Lifehouse
Cop N' Kitty
3780	March 5, 2010	Morgan Freeman, Jason Reitman	Robin Thicke
How Long Will It Take?, Jaywalking: Oscars
3781	March 8, 2010	Simon Cowell, Richard Roeper	Ben Harper
Most Gracious Oscar Speech Of The Night, With Friends Like These..., Ross Mathews At The Vanity Fair Oscar Party
3782	March 9, 2010	Christoph Waltz, Dave Salmoni	Joan Jett and The Blackhearts
What Did You Think Was Gonna Happen?, Headlines
3783	March 10, 2010	Kristen Stewart, Guy Fieri	Ryan Bingham
Sometimes It's Better To Plead The Fifth, Slow News Day News, Goofy Products From Around The World
3784	March 11, 2010	Dana Carvey, Kim Kardashian	Colbie Caillat
Behind The Scenes Practical Joke
3785	March 12, 2010	Dakota Fanning, Judd Apatow	Katharine McPhee
Garfunkel and Oates, Audience Members Bring Their Own Clips For Jay
3786	March 15, 2010	Terry Bradshaw, Kara DioGuardi	Ziggy Marley
Headlines
3787	March 16, 2010	Hugh Jackman, Betty White	Collective Soul
What Did You Think Was Gonna Happen?, Dumb TV, Jaywalking: St. Patrick's Day
3788	March 17, 2010	Dwayne Johnson, Kid Inventors	Switchfoot
Stalker Cam
3789	March 18, 2010	Janet Jackson, Clark Duke	Orianthi
Thank God For Joe Biden, Fun With Google Street View
3790	March 19, 2010	John Cusack, Heidi Montag	Barenaked Ladies
The Worst Job In The World, Pumpcast News
3791	March 22, 2010	Charles Barkley, Ernie Johnson & Kenny Smith, Johnny Weir	k.d. lang
Oops... My Bad Moment Of The Day, The Toyota Whisperer, Headlines
3792	March 23, 2010	Gerard Butler, Sofía Vergara	Rodrigo y Gabriela
Thank God For Joe Biden, What Did You Think Was Gonna Happen?, Jaywalking: The Eyes Have It
3793	March 24, 2010	Ed Helms, Pamela Anderson	Snoop Dogg
Dan Finnerty And The Dan Band At The Laundromat
3794	March 25, 2010	Miley Cyrus, Tom Papa	Puddle of Mudd
Your Local News, Meal Or No Meal
3795	March 26, 2010	Craig T. Nelson, Rumer Willis	Ludacris
Beer Pong Shot Of The Week, Similar... yet Completely Different, Craigslist Confidential
3796	March 29, 2010	Lauren Graham, Karl Rove	Joss Stone
Headlines
3797	March 30, 2010	Joy Behar, Thomas Haden Church	Shooter Jennings
Ross Mathews On Spring Break
3798	March 31, 2010	Bill Maher, Wayne Vandenlangenberg	OneRepublic
What Did You Think Was Gonna Happen?, Jay's Student Film Festival

=== April ===
No.	Original release date	Guest(s)	Musical/entertainment guest(s)
3799	April 1, 2010	Zachary Levi, Bear Grylls	Justin Bieber
Best April Fool's Joke, You Voted For 'Em, All-Star Jaywalk With The Cast Of Celebrity Fit Club
3800	April 5, 2010	Randy Jackson, Matt and Amy Roloff	Monica
Headlines
3801	April 6, 2010	Kirstie Alley, David Boreanaz	Slash featuring Andrew Stockdale
Leno's Book Of World Records
3802	April 7, 2010	David Duchovny, Kendra Wilkinson-Baskett	Corinne Bailey Rae
Jaywalking: Bad Bosses
3803	April 8, 2010	Demi Moore, Barney Frank	Train
What Did You Think Was Gonna Happen?, Products That Should Never Merge
3804	April 9, 2010	Animals with Julie Scardina, Mary McCormack	Michael Kosta
Adding Insult To Injury, Everything Looks More Important When You Play It In Slow Motion And Add Dramatic Music, Brain Scan
3805	April 12, 2010	Russell Crowe, Jenna Elfman	Sade
Beer Pong Shot Of The Week, Headlines
3806	April 13, 2010	Nicolas Cage, Lisa Lampanelli	Lady Antebellum
Jaywalking: Jaywalk Guide To Cheating
3807	April 14, 2010	Tracy Morgan, Chloë Grace Moretz	Alan Jackson
Elon Gold Goes Door To Door
3808	April 15, 2010	Kate Gosselin, Kenny Chesney	Kenny Chesney
Q&A With T&J
3809	April 19, 2010	Brooke Shields, jChat with Adam Carolla, Meghan McCain, & Jim Norton	Phoenix
Some People are just a little Too Into It, What Did You Think Was Gonna Happen?, Headlines
3810	April 20, 2010	Heidi Klum, Ken Jeong	The Smashing Pumpkins
Oops! I'm on camera! Moment Of The Day, Beer Pong Shot Of The Week, Jay Is The Undercover Boss
3811	April 21, 2010	Jennifer Lopez, Donald Glover	Natalie Merchant
Jay Shows The Worst TV Commercials Ever
3812	April 22, 2010	Animals with Jeff Corwin, Pierce Brosnan	Maxwell
Internet Success & Failure
3813	April 23, 2010	Christopher Mintz-Plasse, David Axelrod	Creed
If At First you Don't Succeed... Quit, Stuff We Found On eBay
3814	April 26, 2010	Joel McHale, The Real Housewives of New Jersey	Melissa Etheridge
Headlines
3815	April 27, 2010	Jessica Simpson, Jackie Earle Haley	Dierks Bentley
Jaywalking: Jay's Fitness Quiz
3816	April 28, 2010	Chelsea Handler, Terry Bradshaw	Aqualung
With Friends Like These..., Jay Plays With Google Street View
3817	April 29, 2010	Governor Arnold Schwarzenegger, Captain Sig Hansen	Laura Bell Bundy
Jay Reads Tarot Cards
3918	April 30, 2010	Mickey Rourke, Ashley Graham	Kevin Meaney
Ridiculous 911 Calls

=== May ===
No.	Original release date	Guest(s)	Musical/entertainment guest(s)
3819	May 3, 2010	Julia Louis-Dreyfus, Jon Favreau	Godsmack
Headlines
3820	May 4, 2010	Scarlett Johansson, Frank Caliendo	Michael Bolton
Jay Brings The Tonight Show To Your Home
3821	May 5, 2010	Robert Downey Jr., Mindy Kaling	Kevin Eubanks and The Tonight Show Band
Jackass Of The Month With Adam Carolla
3822	May 6, 2010	Samuel L. Jackson, Kara DioGuardi	Jason Derülo
Beer Pong Shot Of The Week, Adding Insult To Injury, Gift Ideas For Mother's Day
3823	May 7, 2010	Don Cheadle, Erin Andrews	Landon Pigg & Lucy Schwartz
You Can't Outsource Rock'nRoll, Craigslist Confidential
3824	May 10, 2010	Laura Bush, Jessica Kirson	Limp Bizkit
What Did You Think Was Gonna Happen?, Headlines
3825	May 11, 2010	Amanda Seyfried, Guy Fieri	Luke Bryan
Beer Pong Shot Of The Week, All-Star Jaywalk With The Cast Of America's Next Top Model
3826	May 12, 2010	Betty White, Animals with Jarod Miller	Macy Gray
With Friends Like These..., The Ross Report
3827	May 13, 2010	Garry Shandling, Ellie Kemper	Jakob Dylan
Olivia Lee: Hollywood's Detour Guide
3828	May 14, 2010	Donald Trump, Jonas Brothers	Neon Trees
Mister Inappropriate, Meal Or No Meal
3829	May 17, 2010	Bill Cosby, Ricky Gervais	Taio Cruz
Mister Inappropriate, Headlines
3830	May 18, 2010	Michael Douglas, Charles Barkley	Joe Nichols
Hit Or Miss, With Friends Like These..., Garfunkel and Oates, Cop N' Kitty
3831	May 19, 2010	Eddie Murphy, Mary Lynn Rajskub	Nas & Damian Marley
Too Old For Bieber Hair!, Adding Insult To Injury, Photo Booth
3832	May 20, 2010	Chelsea Handler, Chris Matthews	Sarah McLachlan
Value Meal Or Last Meal, Howie Mandel Judges Talent At The Oakwood Apartments
3833	May 21, 2010	Kiefer Sutherland, Carrie Ann Inaba & Bruno Tonioli	Adam Lambert
Mister Inappropriate, Brain Scan
3834	May 24, 2010	Russell Brand, David Gregory	Bettye LaVette
35 Going On 13, Headlines
3835	May 25, 2010	Bret Michaels, Jane Krakowski	John Butler Trio
Too Old For Bieber Hair!, Ross Mathews At The Sex and the City 2 Premiere
3836	May 26, 2010	Kathy Griffin, Paula Deen	Hanson
Audience Members Bring Their Own Clips For Jay
3837	May 27, 2010	Katherine Heigl, Matthew Morrison	Allison Moorer
Trevor Moore Learns From His Elders
3838	May 28, 2010	Colin Farrell, Elisabeth Moss	Kevin Eubanks
Jay And Kev Look Back, Value Meal Or Last Meal

=== June ===
No.	Original release date	Guest(s)	Musical/entertainment guest(s)
3839	June 7, 2010	Howie Mandel, Jillian Michaels	Hole
Adding Insult To Injury, Headlines, Jay Welcomes Rickey Minor and the new The Tonight Show Band
3840	June 8, 2010	Chris Rock, Nicole "Snooki" Polizzi	Sting
Jaywalking: How Bad Is Your Guy At Remembering Romantic Moments?
3841	June 9, 2010	Adam Sandler, Rachel Maddow	OK Go
Value Meal Or Last Meal, Stalker Cam With Mikey Day
3842	June 10, 2010	Denis Leary, Judd Apatow	Alanis Morissette
Why Americans Don't Watch Soccer, Mister Inappropriate, Stuff We Found On eBay
3843	June 11, 2010	Tim Allen, Jordan Romero	Against Me!
Just When You Thought No One Was Looking, Elon Gold Is The Super Duper Nanny
3844	June 14, 2010	Josh Brolin, Ashley Greene	Cee-Lo Green
World Cup Soccer Players Or Male Exotic Dancers?, Adding Insult To Injury, Headlines, Chicago Blackhawks
3845	June 15, 2010	Robert Pattinson, Emma Roberts	Travie McCoy
What Did You Think Was Gonna Happen?, The Ross Report
3846	June 16, 2010	Lauren Graham, Rob Schneider	Matisyahu
Beer Pong Shot Of The Week, Pumpcasting
3847	June 17, 2010	Jonah Hill, Quinton "Rampage" Jackson	Punch Brothers
How Long Will It Take?, Past, Present, Future
3848	June 18, 2010	David Spade, Pau Gasol	Kelis
Americans Have Come A Long Way In Soccer, Newscaster Or Hooters Waitress?, Cute Not Cute, Jay Looks At Celebrity Yearbooks
3849	June 21, 2010	Dakota Fanning, Graeme McDowell	Crystal Bowersox
Headlines
3850	June 22, 2010	Queen Latifah, Mike "The Situation" Sorrentino	Robert Randolph and the Family Band
Jaywalking: IndepenDunce Day
3851	June 23, 2010	Jeremy Piven, Louis C. K.	Drake
WTF Moment, Meal Or No Meal
3852	June 24, 2010	Tom Cruise, Bryce Dallas Howard	Sharon Jones & The Dap-Kings
Mister Inappropriate, Ridiculous 911 Calls
3853	June 25, 2010	Cameron Diaz, The Parasite Guy Dan Riskin	Lee DeWyze
Come On, It's Just A Turtle!, Healthy Week Health Tip, Ross Mathews At The Premiere Of The Twilight Saga: Eclipse

=== July ===
No.	Original release date	Guest(s)	Musical/entertainment guest(s)
3854	July 6, 2010	Jason Segel, Jenni "J-Wow" Farley	Enrique Iglesias
Is This Guy WAY Too Excited To Meet Sarah Palin?, How Long Will It Take?, Headlines
3855	July 7, 2010	John C. Reilly, Animals with Dave Salmoni	Big Boi
Jackass Of The Month With Adam Carolla, You Can't Outsource Rock'nRoll
3856	July 8, 2010	Steve Carell, Jane Lynch	Michael Palascak
The Surly Psychic
3857	July 9, 2010	Vice President Joe Biden, Adrien Brody	Chris Isaak
99 Cent Shopping Spree, What I'd Like To See Happen On The Bachelorette
3858	July 12, 2010	Seth Meyers, Johnathan Hillstrand & Josh Harris	Tracy Bonham
World Cup Championship Highlights, Dumb TV, How Long Will It Take?, Headlines
3859	July 13, 2010	Jennifer Love Hewitt, Jay Baruchel	Nikki & Rich
Instant Karma, Home Run Derby Or Project Runway, Jaywalking: Jay Leno's Big Break
3860	July 14, 2010	Tracy Morgan, Drew Brees	Flo Rida
Olivia Lee As The Pet Psychic
3861	July 15, 2010	Elliot Page, Corey Harrison & Chumlee	Grace Potter & The Nocturnals
Owen Benjamin Hits The Red Carpet At The ESPY Awards
3862	July 16, 2010	Craig Kilborn, Stephen Moyer	The Swell Season
Mel Gibson's Movie Line Or Phone Call, Internet Success & Failure
3863	July 19, 2010	Don Rickles, Dwyane Wade	Kiss
Too Old For Bieber Hair!, Freudian Slip Of The Day, Headlines
3864	July 20, 2010	Zac Efron, Mentalist Lior Suchard	The Black Keys
What I'd Like To See Happen On The Bachelorette, The Ross Report
3865	July 21, 2010	Chelsea Handler, Matt Bomer	Metric
Too Old For Bieber Hair!, Oops... My Bad Moment Of The Day, Value Meal Or Last Meal, Jim Norton Reports From The Invention Convention
3866	July 22, 2010	Wanda Sykes, Winnebago Man Jack Rebney	30H!3
Value Meal Or Last Meal, Jay's Pre-Show Ritual
3867	July 23, 2010	Rachel Weisz, Tony Robbins	The Gaslight Anthem
Oops... My Bad Moment Of The Day, Learn The Fundamentals, Jay Shows The Worst Commercials Ever
3868	July 26, 2010	Bill O'Reilly, Adam Shankman	Lyle Lovett and His Large Band
Ingredient In A Snack Food Or Ingredient In A Bomb?, Headlines
3869	July 27, 2010	Piers Morgan, Joey King	Jaron and the Long Road to Love
Something You Don't Hear Every Day, Value Meal Or Last Meal, What I'd Like To See Happen On The Bachelor, Jaywalking: Blockbusters On A Budget
3870	July 28, 2010	Eva Mendes, Isaiah Mustafa	The Robert Cray Band
Mister Inappropriate, Jay Checks Out iPad Apps
3871	July 29, 2010	Jennifer Aniston, Jason Schwartzman	Christina Perri
Real Or Fake?, Anything You Can Do I Can Do Better, Products That Should Never Merge
3872	July 30, 2010	Gabourey Sidibe, Extreme Fisherman Jakub Vágner	Mike Vecchione
What I'd Like To See Happen On The Bachelorette, Craigslist Confidential

=== August ===
No.	Original release date	Guest(s)	Musical/entertainment guest(s)
3873	August 2, 2010	Sylvester Stallone, Criss Angel	Maronzio Vance
Then And Now, Headlines
3874	August 3, 2010	Betty White, Sam Trammell	The Black Crowes
Value Meal Or Last Meal, Be Careful What You Wish For, Similar... yet Completely Different, What I'd Like To See Happen On The Bachelorette, Nick Thune Rocks The X-Games
3875	August 4, 2010	Gordon Ramsay, Sofía Vergara	K'naan
Busted, Photo Booth
3876	August 5, 2010	Mickey Rourke, Seth MacFarlane	Plain White T's
Country Or Maury, Jaywalking: What's In Your Office?
3877	August 6, 2010	Emma Thompson, Sarah Colonna, Heather McDonald, Brad Wollack	Taio Cruz
A Day In The Life Of Our Correspondents
3878	August 9, 2010	Howie Mandel, Aubrey Plaza	Mike Posner
Headlines
3879	August 10, 2010	Anna Kendrick, Eli Roth	Robert Francis
What Shade Of Orange Is John Boehner?, Jaywalking: Summer Vacation Spots
3880	August 11, 2010	Jason Statham, Rachel Veitch	Los Lobos
¿Dónde está Aida?, Pee-wee Herman's Sturgis Motorcycle Rally Adventure!
3881	August 12, 2010	Javier Bardem, Paul Watson & Peter Bethune	The Whigs
Worst Workout Video Of All Time, Meal Or No Meal
3882	August 13, 2010	Justin Long, "Stone Cold" Steve Austin	Alejandro Escovedo
Tonight Show Book Of World Records
3883	August 30, 2010	Don Johnson, Whitney Cummings	Cyndi Lauper with Jonny Lang
What A Double-Dip Recession Would Look Like If The Economy Were A Skateboarder, You're Not Lady Gaga, Headlines
3884	August 31, 2010	Kim Kardashian, Congressman Barney Frank	Norah Jones
Jaywalking: Breakup Guide

=== September ===
No.	Original release date	Guest(s)	Musical/entertainment guest(s)
3885	September 1, 2010	Thomas Haden Church, Reptiles with Jules Sylvester	Goo Goo Dolls
Silliest Joke Of The Day, Government Project Or Wise-Ass Student Project?, Jackass Of The Month With Adam Carolla
3886	September 2, 2010	Al Michaels and Cris Collinsworth, Steve Buscemi	Herbie Hancock with Susan Tedeschi and Derek Trucks
Leave It To The Pros, Stuff We Found On eBay
3887	September 3, 2010	Louis C. K., Bristol Palin	Sara Bareilles
How Long Will It Take?, Similar...yet Completely Different, Back To School Products
3888	September 7, 2010	Carey Mulligan, Meghan McCain	Mavis Staples
Up To Good Or No Good?, Lady Gaga's Worst Nightmare, Headlines
3889	September 8, 2010	Chelsea Handler, Ken Jeong	Ray LaMontagne
99 Cent Shopping Spree
3890	September 9, 2010	Katie Couric, Kurt Warner	David Gray
Jaywalking: You Be The Nominee
3891	September 10, 2010	Hugh Laurie, Emma Stone	Sarah McLachlan
Jim Norton Covers The NFL Kickoff
3892	September 13, 2010	Bill Maher, Kristen Bell	Brandon Flowers
Headlines
3893	September 14, 2010	Jamie Lee Curtis, Mike "The Situation" Sorrentino	Trace Adkins
What Did You Think Was Gonna Happen?, NFL Wedgie Of The Week, Jaywalking: Reality... Or Reality Stars?
3894	September 15, 2010	Ben Affleck, Julie Bowen	Weezer
Jay Takes An Early Look At New Fall TV Shows
3895	September 16, 2010	Kate Walsh, Jason Ritter	Santana featuring India.Arie
Funny... But Not That Funny, The Ross Report
3896	September 17, 2010	Joel McHale, Arianna Huffington	Dov Davidoff
Value Meal Or Last Meal, Love Advice From Jay & Jim Norton
3897	September 20, 2010	Justin Timberlake, Jane Lynch	OK Go
Headlines
3898	September 21, 2010	Ed Helms, Casey Affleck	Sheryl Crow
Always Wear A Helmet, Jaywalking: Good Dancer Bad Dancer
3899	September 22, 2010	Ryan Reynolds, Betty White	Tommy Lee's Methods of Mayhem
Bartender, Politician Or Comic?, Ridiculous 911 Calls
3900	September 23, 2010	Jimmy Smits, Jackie Evancho	Brian Wilson
Photo Booth
3901	September 24, 2010	Dwyane Wade, Zachary Levi	Gloria Gaynor
Hockey Player Or Prescription Medication, Similar... yet Completely Different, Cop 'N Kitty
3902	September 27, 2010	Lauren Graham, Vanilla Ice	Zac Brown Band
Too Old For Bieber Hair!, Headlines
3903	September 28, 2010	Patrick Dempsey, Mindy Kaling	Train
Value Meal Or Last Meal, Craigslist Confidential
3904	September 29, 2010	Animals with Julie Scardina, Diane Lane	Seal
How To Write For The Tonight Show With Nick Thune
3905	September 30, 2010	Morgan Freeman, Eric Stonestreet	Rodrigo y Gabriela
You Asked For It..., Driver's License Or Mug Shot?, Mikey Day With JMZ

=== October ===
No.	Original release date	Guest(s)	Musical/entertainment guest(s)
3906	October 1, 2010	Meredith Vieira, Seth MacFarlane	Kenny Chesney
Grandpa, Can We Please Go Home Now?, Jaywalking: Imported Phrases
3907	October 4, 2010	Will Arnett, Dot-Marie Jones	Rock of Ages
Always Know When The Camera's On, Headlines
3908	October 5, 2010	Terrence Howard, Jillian Michaels	KT Tunstall
Jay Checks Out iPad Apps
3909	October 6, 2010	Shaun White, Florence Henderson	Toby Keith
Anybody Got A Step Stool?, How Long Will It Take?, Jay Goes Door To Door
3910	October 7, 2010	Katherine Heigl, Ben Rappaport	Meatloaf
Too Old For Bieber Hair!, Don't Try This At Home: Jackass Edition
3911	October 8, 2010	Kristen Stewart, Doretta Cannon	OneRepublic
Get To Know Your 2010 Candidates, Politicians Should Stick To Slinging Mud, Q&A With T&J
3912	October 11, 2010	Jay Mohr, Pauly D.	Travie McCoy
Worst Parents Since The Lohans?, Headlines
3913	October 12, 2010	Heidi Klum, Ty Burrell	Johnny Mathis
Jim Norton Searches For America's Next Great Screenwriter
3914	October 13, 2010	Harrison Ford, Whitney Cummings	Gogol Bordello
Get To Know Your 2010 Candidates, Real Products For Pets
3915	October 14, 2010	Wanda Sykes, Rick Fox	Pete Yorn
The Ross Report
3916	October 15, 2010	Eva Longoria, Josh Duhamel	John Legend
Know Your State Song, It Looks Dirty, But It's Not, Too Old For Bieber Hair!, Internet Success & Failure
3917	October 25, 2010	Matt Lauer, Martha Stewart	Lauren Pritchard
What Did You Think Was Gonna Happen?, Hey! What Kind Of Storm Is This?, Headlines
3918	October 26, 2010	Robert Downey Jr., Paula Deen	Jamey Johnson
Beer Pong Shot Of The Week, Jaywalking: Party Lines
3919	October 27, 2010	Robin Williams, Judd Apatow	Kylie Minogue
Get To Know Your 2010 Candidates, Ross Mathews At The World Series In San Francisco
3920	October 28, 2010	Denzel Washington, Reed Timmer	Corinne Bailey Rae
Where Did Charlie Sheen Show Up Today?, What I'd Like To See Happen On Jersey Shore, Scary Halloween Products
3921	October 29, 2010	Rainn Wilson, "The Gourd Lady" Margaret Sparkman	Jimmy Eat World
Where Did Charlie Sheen Show Up Today?, Mud, Pot & Politics

=== November ===
No.	Original release date	Guest(s)	Musical/entertainment guest(s)
3922	November 1, 2010	Janet Jackson, Jesse Tyler Ferguson	Duffy
What Did You Think Was Gonna Happen?, Where Did Charlie Sheen Show Up Today?, Headlines
3923	November 3, 2010	James Franco, Meghan McCain	Far East Movement
Maybe It's The Office, How Long Will It Take?, Jaywalking: Know Your Brands
3924	November 4, 2010	Anne Hathaway, Brian "The Beard" Wilson	Aaron Neville
Man Vs. Nature, Stuff We Found On eBay
3925	November 5, 2010	Terry Bradshaw, Jennifer Grey	Jason Aldean
Game Over, Meal Or No Meal
3926	November 8, 2010	Governor Arnold Schwarzenegger, David Baker	N.E.R.D.
Is Dick's House Better Than Disney World?, Headlines
3927	November 9, 2010	Animals with Dave Salmoni, Chris Pine	Lee DeWyze
Hey! What Are You Doin' There?, Dan Finnerty And The Dan Band
3928	November 10, 2010	David Spade, Christine O'Donnell	Old 97's
Battle Of The Jaywalk All-Stars
3929	November 11, 2010	Kim Kardashian, Dennis Miller	Soulja Boy
Products That Should Never Merge
3930	November 12, 2010	Diane Keaton, Kevin McHale	Switchfoot
Value Meal Or Last Meal, Love Advice With Jim Norton
3931	November 15, 2010	Russell Crowe, Anna Torv	Annie Lennox
Value Meal Or Last Meal, Headlines
3932	November 16, 2010	Julianne Moore, Tom Felton	Nelly
NBC Green Week Tip Of The Day, Photo Booth
3933	November 17, 2010	Christina Aguilera, Buddy Valastro	Christina Aguilera
One Sneaky S.O.B., Santa... Easy On The Eggnog!, Jaywalking: The Green Screen Test
3934	November 18, 2010	Former President George W. Bush	Jewel
A Metaphor For The American Voter, Santa... Easy On The Eggnog!, Harlequin Novel Or TSA Complaint?, 99 Cent Shopping Spree
3935	November 19, 2010	Garth Brooks, Mike "The Situation" Sorrentino	Garth Brooks
Copycats
3936	November 22, 2010	Taylor Swift, Dane Cook	Keri Hilson
What The Band Is Thankful For This Holiday Season, Ross Mathews At The American Music Awards
3937	November 23, 2010	Dwayne Johnson, Nicole Perretta	Kevin Eubanks
Headlines
3938	November 24, 2010	Cher, Jeremy Renner	Robyn
What The Band Is Thankful For This Holiday Season, Ridiculous 911 Calls
3939	November 25, 2010	Elizabeth Banks, Marjorie Johnson	Carrot Top
You're No Martha Stewart, Which Has More Calories?, Jaywalking: Holiday Hiring Guide
3940	November 29, 2010	Bill Cosby, Atticus Shaffer	Keyshia Cole
Headlines
3941	November 30, 2010	Chelsea Handler, Kellan Lutz	Rod Stewart
It's The Most Wonderful Time Of The Year!, Jackass Of The Month With Adam Carolla

=== December ===
No.	Original release date	Guest(s)	Musical/entertainment guest(s)
3942	December 1, 2010	Mitt Romney, Jay Mohr	Darius Rucker
Jaywalking: Good Caroler Bad Caroler
3943	December 2, 2010	Jane Fonda, Ian Somerhalder	Paul Reiser & Julia Fordham
Your Tax Dollars At Work, The Surly Psychic
3944	December 3, 2010	Louis C. K., Aron Ralston	Josh Turner
TV Scenes & Themes
3945	December 6, 2010	Russell Brand, Chris Colfer	Jonny Lang, Brad Whitford, Billy Cox, Chris Layton
Too Old For Bieber Hair!, Similar... yet Completely Different, Headlines
3946	December 7, 2010	Helen Mirren, Aaron Eckhart	Keith Urban
Elon Gold's Common Courtesy Police
3947	December 8, 2010	Jeff Bridges, Rico Rodriguez	Shelby Lynne
It's The Most Wonderful Time Of The Year!, Hey Mom! I'm On TV!, Wait A Minute... Back That Up, Mister Inappropriate, Jay's Most Interesting People Of The Year
3948	December 9, 2010	Halle Berry, Billy Gardell	Natasha Bedingfield
Godfather Or Grandmother?, Pumpcasting
3949	December 10, 2010	Matthew Morrison, Bizarre Christmas Musicians	Crystal Bowersox
It's The Most Wonderful Time Of The Year!, Spot The Cable Christmas Special, Value Meal Or Wesley Snipes Prison Meal, Look! There's a Dog in the Car!, Behind The Scenes With Jay
3950	December 13, 2010	Mark Wahlberg, Olivia Wilde	Good Charlotte
Headlines
3951	December 14, 2010	Jack Black	Michael Bublé
It's The Most Wonderful Time Of The Year!, Jay Goes Door To Door Spreading Holiday Cheer
3952	December 15, 2010	Emily Blunt, Keith Fitzhugh	Jackie Evancho
Jay's Christmas Gift Ideas
3953	December 16, 2010	Jason Segel, Adam Ferrara, Tanner Foust, Rutledge Wood	Katharine McPhee
It's The Most Wonderful Time Of The Year!, A Very Tonight Show Christmas
3954	December 17, 2010	Owen Wilson, Elle Fanning	Lyle Lovett featuring Kat Edmonson
It's The Most Wonderful Time Of The Year!, The Ross Report
3955	December 20, 2010	Larry King, Garrett Hedlund	Pink Martini
Headlines
3956	December 21, 2010	Emma Stone, Marjorie Johnson	Sharon Jones & The Dap-Kings
It's The Most Wonderful Time Of The Year!, 99 Cent Christmas
3957	December 22, 2010	Javier Bardem, Animals with Jarod Miller	Naturally 7
It Ain't Over 'Til It's Over, It's The Most Wonderful Time Of The Year!, Jaywalking: A Green Screen Christmas
3958	December 23, 2010	Zachary Levi, Whitney Cummings	Bebe & Cece Winans and Mary Mary featuring The West Angeles Church Choir
Man Vs. Nature, It's The Most Wonderful Time Of The Year!, Maybe It's The Host, Holiday Advice With Jay & Jim Norton
