= List of The Tonight Show with Jay Leno episodes (2000–2009) =

Release
- Original network: NBC

Season chronology
- ← Previous; 1996–99 episodes Next → 2010 episodes

This is a list of episodes for The Tonight Show with Jay Leno that aired from 2000 to 2009.

== 2000 ==
=== January ===
No.	Original release date	Guest(s)	Musical/entertainment guest(s)
TBA	January 3, 2000	Dennis Rodman, Charlize Theron	Martina McBride
TBA	January 4, 2000	Linda Cardellini, William H. Macy, John Pinette	N/A
TBA	January 5, 2000	Tim Robbins, Uri Geller	Aimee Mann
TBA	January 6, 2000	Hallie Eisenberg, Ethan Hawke	Lyle Lovett, Burt Bacharach
TBA	January 7, 2000	Eddie Cibrian, Jenny McCarthy	Lonestar
TBA	January 10, 2000	Antonio Banderas, Hilary Swank	Tony Bennett
TBA	January 11, 2000	Anne Heche, Chris Matthews	Savage Garden
TBA	January 12, 2000	Jessica Lange, Topher Grace	Clint Black, Steve Wariner
TBA	January 13, 2000	Denzel Washington, Angel Tolentino	Foo Fighters
TBA	January 14, 2000	David Arquette, Ainsley Harriott, Emily Watson	N/A
TBA	January 24, 2000	Lorraine Bracco, Sarah Hanson	Diana Krall
TBA	January 25, 2000	Sarah, Duchess of York, Ice Cube	Alecia Elliott
TBA	January 26, 2000	Selma Blair, Matt Damon	Third Eye Blind
TBA	January 27, 2000	David Lynch, David Hyde Pierce	Wynonna Judd
TBA	January 28, 2000	Heidi Klum, Jonathan Taylor Thomas	Chris Cornell
TBA	January 31, 2000	Kim Delaney, Frankie Muniz	Sixpence None the Richer

=== February ===
No.	Original release date	Guest(s)	Musical/entertainment guest(s)
TBA	February 1, 2000	Reese Witherspoon, James Carville	Bob Schneider
Iron Jay, Jay "interviews" a couple changing sexes
TBA	February 2, 2000	Kelsey Grammer, Amy Brenneman	Dwight Yoakam
Jaywalking, Edd gets chased by Punxsutawney Phil
TBA	February 3, 2000	Courtney Cox Arquette, Brady Barr	Tina Turner
Presidential Jeopardy, a clip of Jay and Kevin in The Hurricane
TBA	February 4, 2000	Sandra Bullock, Dick Vermeil	Montell Jordan with LL Cool J
Midnight Confessions (with John McCain)
TBA	February 7, 2000	Lisa Kudrow, 4-year old Mensa member Priya Purewal	Shannon Curfman
Headlines
TBA	February 8, 2000	Martin Short, Kobe Bryant	The Shaolin Monks
Jaywalking
TBA	February 9, 2000	Matthew Perry, kid magicians	Counting Crows
Ask Jay Anything
TBA	February 10, 2000	Vice President Al Gore, Jimmy Smits	Jonny Lang
Battle of the Jaywalk All-Stars
TBA	February 11, 2000	Chyna, Diane Keaton	Smash Mouth
TBA	February 14, 2000	David Spade, Professor Claire MacDonald	Tracy Chapman
Headlines, Jay interviews Cupid and Jeff Dunham
TBA	February 15, 2000	Judy Sheindlin, Giovanni Ribisi	Melissa Etheridge
Larry Miller reports from the Aspen Comedy Festival
TBA	February 16, 2000	Meg Ryan, Emmanuel Yarbrough	Little Richard
Battle of the Jaywalk All-Stars
TBA	February 17, 2000	Kurt Warner, Julie Scardina	Dixie Chicks
New Toys
TBA	February 18, 2000	Kevin Spacey, Christina Applegate	A3
Jaywalking
TBA	February 21, 2000	Howard Stern, Tobey Maguire	Vertical Horizon
Headlines
TBA	February 22, 2000	Richard Simmons, Michael Clarke Duncan	Yolanda Adams
Jaywalking
TBA	February 23, 2000	Ben Affleck, Daniela Peštová, David Copperfield	N/A
Before They Were Here
TBA	February 24, 2000	Michael Douglas, 12-year-old chef Tai-Tien Chan	Santana feat. The Product G&B
Chris Isaak reports from the Grammys
TBA	February 25, 2000	Rodney Dangerfield, David Willey	Macy Gray
Idiots for a Day
TBA	February 28, 2000	Pamela Anderson Lee, David Boreanaz	Sammie
TBA	February 29, 2000	Ellen DeGeneres and Sharon Stone, Casey Affleck	Angie Stone
Harland Williams reports from the Houston Livestock Show and Rodeo

=== March ===
No.	Original release date	Guest(s)	Musical/entertainment guest(s)
TBA	March 1, 2000	Neve Campbell, Judy Gold, John McCain	N/A
TBA	March 2, 2000	Tyra Banks, Garry Shandling	Filter
TBA	March 3, 2000	Jamie Lee Curtis, Michael C. Maronna	Destiny's Child
TBA	March 6, 2000	George W. Bush, Gary Sinise	D'Angelo
TBA	March 7, 2000	Angelina Jolie, French Stewart	Asleep at the Wheel feat. Dwight Yoakam
TBA	March 8, 2000	Annette Bening, Chloë Sevigny	Marc Anthony
TBA	March 9, 2000	Mitch Fatel, Rick Schroder	Eric Benet
TBA	March 10, 2000	Jerry O'Connell, Hilary Swank	SHeDAISY
TBA	March 13, 2000	Angie and Larry Harmon, Jason Sehorn	Elton John
TBA	March 14, 2000	Richard Farnsworth, Julianne Moore	Nick Lachey, Jessica Simpson
TBA	March 15, 2000	Don Cheadle, Camryn Manheim	Tom Waits
TBA	March 16, 2000	William Shatner, Jamie Luner	N/A
TBA	March 17, 2000	Michael Imperioli, Haley Joel Osment	Enrique Iglesias
TBA	March 20, 2000	Molly Shannon, Jet Li	Tracy Lawrence
TBA	March 21, 2000	Michael Caine, Darren Carter, Leelee Sobieski	N/A
TBA	March 22, 2000	Jennifer Love Hewitt, Wassup Guys	Diana Krall
TBA	March 23, 2000	David Duchovny, Benny Koske	Mandy Moore
TBA	March 24, 2000	Roger Ebert, the Rock	Fiona Apple
TBA	March 27, 2000	Lacey Chabert, Kevin Spacey	Blink-182
TBA	March 28, 2000	Denzel Washington	Foo Fighters
TBA	March 29, 2000	Sandra Bullock	Montell Jordan, LL Cool J
TBA	March 30, 2000	Meg Ryan	Little Richard
TBA	March 31, 2000	Katie Holmes, Steve Martin	Julian Lennon

=== April ===
No.	Original release date	Guest(s)	Musical/entertainment guest(s)
TBA	April 3, 2000	Kirsten Dunst, John McEnroe	Catatonia
TBA	April 4, 2000	Joan Embery, Greg Mathis	NSYNC
TBA	April 5, 2000	John Travolta	Goo Goo Dolls
TBA	April 6, 2000	Noah Wyle	Bloodhound Gang
TBA	April 7, 2000	Claudia Schiffer, Terry Bradshaw	N/A
TBA	April 10, 2000	David Arquette, Elizabeth Perkins	Oasis
TBA	April 11, 2000	D.L. Hughley, Lucy Lawless	Patti Smith
TBA	April 12, 2000	Robin Williams, The Umbilical Brothers	No Doubt
TBA	April 13, 2000	Shaquille O'Neal, Kyra Sedgwick	Charlotte Church
TBA	April 14, 2000	Emeril Lagasse, Edward Norton	Pink
TBA	April 17, 2000	Bob Costas, Harvey Keitel	Joe
TBA	April 18, 2000	Jon Bon Jovi, Heather Graham	N/A
TBA	April 19, 2000	Sandra Bullock, Gilbert Gottfried, Penn & Teller, Martin Sheen	N/A
TBA	April 20, 2000	Maria Bartiromo, Bill Paxton	Randy Travis
TBA	April 21, 2000	Lacey Chabert, Jeff Dunham, Christopher Titus	Ani DiFranco
TBA	April 24, 2000	Kathleen Madigan, Montel Williams	KC and the Sunshine Band
TBA	April 25, 2000	Tom Arnold, Vinessa Shaw	Toni Braxton
TBA	April 26, 2000	Arsenio Hall, Melissa Joan Hart	Aaliyah
TBA	April 27, 2000	Matthew McConaughey	Bush
TBA	April 28, 2000	Kristin Davis	Blink-182

=== May ===
No.	Original release date	Guest(s)	Musical/entertainment guest(s)
TBA	May 10, 2000	Joaquin Phoenix	LeAnn Rimes
TBA	May 11, 2000	Cindy Crawford, Dennis Quaid	Mary J. Blige
TBA	May 12, 2000	Sofia Coppola, Charlie Sheen, Jeremy McGrath	N/A
TBA	May 15, 2000	Richard Harris	Enrique Iglesias
TBA	May 16, 2000	Nicolas King, Tom Selleck	Brian McKnight
TBA	May 17, 2000	Tom Green, Judy Sheindlin	3 Doors Down
TBA	May 18, 2000	Tom Cruise, Tracey Ullman	Stone Temple Pilots
TBA	May 19, 2000	Dennis Franz, Charlie Sheen, Jeremy McGrath	Supergrass
TBA	May 22, 2000	Kenneth Branagh	En Vogue
TBA	May 23, 2000	Ving Rhames, Martha Stewart, John Pinette	N/A
TBA	May 24, 2000	Halle Berry, Jackie Chan	Shelby Lynne
TBA	May 25, 2000	Billy Crystal, Jon Guenther	The Mighty Mighty Bosstones
TBA	May 26, 2000	Pat Riley	The B-52’s

=== June ===
No.	Original release date	Guest(s)	Musical/entertainment guest(s)
TBA	June 5, 2000	Nicolas Cage, Freddie Prinze Jr.	Lou Reed
TBA	June 6, 2000	Angelina Jolie, Seann William Scott	Lee Ann Womack
TBA	June 7, 2000	Terry Bradshaw, Vanessa Williams	Aimee Mann
TBA	June 8, 2000	Matthew Perry, Deion Sanders	Destiny's Child
TBA	June 9, 2000	Heather Donahue, Keenan Ivory Wayans	Nine Days
TBA	June 12, 2000	Michael Jezierny, Lucy Liu	Kenny Chesney
TBA	June 13, 2000	Peter and Bobby Farrelly, Debra Messing	Smash Mouth
TBA	June 14, 2000	Oscar De La Hoya, Alicia Silverstone	Vitamin C
TBA	June 15, 2000	Mark Gross, Jesse Ventura	Duran Duran
TBA	June 16, 2000	Chyna, Samuel L. Jackson	Creed
TBA	June 19, 2000	Jeremy Hotz, Steve Young	Cast of Fosse
TBA	June 20, 2000	Lara Flynn Boyle, Richard Roundtree	Marc Anthony
TBA	June 21, 2000	The Rock, Shaquille O'Neal	Christina Aguilera
TBA	June 22, 2000	Jim Carrey, "Sugar" Shane Mosley	k.d. lang
TBA	June 23, 2000	Robert De Niro, Marlon Wayans	Foo Fighters
TBA	June 26, 2000	Jason Alexander, Mark Wahlberg	Splender
TBA	June 27, 2000	Heath Ledger, Rene Russo	Lara Fabian
TBA	June 28, 2000	Shannon Elizabeth, Bill Maher	Patty Loveless
TBA	June 29, 2000	Claire Forlani, Mel Gibson	Blue Man Group
TBA	June 30, 2000	Jeff Dunham, Derrick Seaver, Courtney Thorne-Smith	The Go-Go's

=== July ===
No.	Original release date	Guest(s)	Musical/entertainment guest(s)
TBA	July 3, 2000	Angie Harmon	Elton John
TBA	July 4, 2000	Jerry O'Connell, Hilary Swank	SHeDAISY
TBA	July 5, 2000	Selma Blair, Matt Damon	Third Eye Blind
TBA	July 6, 2000	The Umbilical Brothers, Robin Williams	No Doubt
TBA	July 7, 2000	Jennifer Love Hewitt	Diana Krall
TBA	July 10, 2000	Willie Barcena	Everclear
TBA	July 11, 2000	Richard Simmons, Nicole Sullivan	Billy Gilman
TBA	July 12, 2000	Spencer Breslin, Mary Elizabeth Mastrantonio	BBMak
TBA	July 13, 2000	George Clooney	Dogstar
Synchronized swimmers
TBA	July 14, 2000	Natasha Lyonne, Keenan Ivory Wayans	Don Henley
TBA	July 17, 2000	Alec Baldwin, Famke Janssen	Kid Rock feat. Metallica
TBA	July 18, 2000	Anthony Anderson, Mongo Brownlee, Jerod Mixon, Rebecca Romijn-Stamos	Kina
TBA	July 19, 2000	Katie Couric, Mena Suvari	Nelly
TBA	July 20, 2000	Jason Biggs, Michelle Pfeiffer	Mötley Crüe
TBA	July 21, 2000	Amy Acuff, Ellen DeGeneres	Dido
TBA	July 24, 2000	Marion Jones	Bon Jovi
TBA	July 25, 2000	Lorraine Bracco, Hugh Jackman	Eve 6
TBA	July 26, 2000	Halle Berry, Christopher Titus	Kelly Price
TBA	July 27, 2000	Lance Armstrong, Dennis Miller	Lucy Pearl
TBA	July 28, 2000	Harrison Ford, Michael Johnson	Busta Rhymes
TBA	July 31, 2000	Kevin Bacon, Lance Burton, Jaime King	N/A

=== August ===
No.	Original release date	Guest(s)	Musical/entertainment guest(s)
TBA	August 1, 2000	Clint Eastwood, James Garner, Shane Hamman, Tommy Lee Jones, Donald Sutherland	Rachael Lampa
TBA	August 2, 2000	Elisabeth Shue	Sheryl Crow, Steve Earle
Adult inventors
TBA	August 3, 2000	Magic Johnson, Larry Miller	The Brian Setzer Orchestra
TBA	August 4, 2000	Piper Perabo, David Spade	No Doubt
TBA	August 7, 2000	Keanu Reeves, Venus Williams	Hanson
TBA	August 8, 2000	Kim Cattrall, Carson Daly	Nina Gordon
TBA	August 9, 2000	Arsenio Hall, Teri Hatcher	Martina McBride
TBA	August 10, 2000	Chris Matthews, Sarah Jessica Parker	Sting
TBA	August 11, 2000	Maria Bello, Hillary Clinton	Victoria Williams
TBA	August 14, 2000	Karenna Gore Schiff, Kristin Gore, Jon Stewart	Jimmy Page and The Black Crowes
TBA	August 15, 2000	Christie Brinkley, Matt Lauer	Sinead O'Connor
TBA	August 16, 2000	Tipper Gore, Orlando Jones	Willie Nelson
TBA	August 17, 2000	James Carville, Juan Carlos Hernandez	Lee Ann Womack
TBA	August 18, 2000	Jennifer Lopez, Kyle MacLachlan	Sisqó
TBA	August 21, 2000	Richard Simmons	Gipsy Kings
Exotic reptiles
TBA	August 22, 2000	Taye Diggs, Kirsten Dunst	Morcheeba
TBA	August 23, 2000	Amanda Peet, The Rock	Lucy Pearl
TBA	August 24, 2000	Jeff Probst, Vince Vaughn	Vertical Horizon
TBA	August 25, 2000	Rodney Dangerfield, Juliette Lewis	Third Eye Blind

=== September ===
No.	Original release date	Guest(s)	Musical/entertainment guest(s)
TBA	September 5, 2000	Jamie Lee Curtis, Stacy Dragila	Sixpence None the Richer
TBA	September 6, 2000	Joan Embery, Howie Mandel	Rickie Lee Jones
Animals on display
TBA	September 7, 2000	Terry Bradshaw, Rick Lazio	Joan Osborne
Kid inventors
TBA	September 8, 2000	Sylvester Stallone	Savage Garden
TBA	September 11, 2000	Allison Janney, Geraldo Rivera	Al Green
TBA	September 12, 2000	D. L. Hughley, Ralph Nader	Gloria Estefan
TBA	September 13, 2000	Patricia Heaton, Dennis Rodman	The Corrs
TBA	September 14, 2000	Renée Zellweger	Santana ft. Maná
TBA	September 15, 2000	Penélope Cruz, Fred Willard	Son by Four

=== October ===
No.	Original release date	Guest(s)	Musical/entertainment guest(s)
TBA	October 2, 2000	Pamela Anderson, Christopher Titus	Cast of Contact
TBA	October 3, 2000	Yasmine Bleeth, Jackie Chan	Phish
TBA	October 4, 2000	Rulon Gardner, Norm Macdonald	Spinal Tap
TBA	October 5, 2000	Jeff Bridges, Joe Lockhart	98 Degrees
TBA	October 6, 2000	Richard Gere, Jenny Thompson	Barenaked Ladies
TBA	October 9, 2000	Debra Messing	Christina Aguilera
TBA	October 10, 2000	Tim Meadows, Bette Midler	Lyle Lovett
TBA	October 11, 2000	Chyna, Noah Wyle	Collective Soul
TBA	October 12, 2000	Heather Locklear, James Van Der Beek	Jewel
TBA	October 13, 2000	Jessica Alba, Drew Carey, Ian Thorpe	Macy Gray
TBA	October 16, 2000	Sarah Michelle Gellar, Kevin Spacey	Papa Roach
TBA	October 17, 2000	Michelle Rodriguez, Charlie Sheen	PJ Harvey
TBA	October 18, 2000	Larry Elder, Lisa Kudrow, Haley Joel Osment	Steve Earle
TBA	October 19, 2000	Jessica Alba, Calista Flockhart	Everlast
A mule does tricks
TBA	October 20, 2000	Rosie Perez, Michael Richards	Nelly Furtado
TBA	October 23, 2000	Carrot Top, Jenna Elfman	Shawn Mullins
TBA	October 24, 2000	Greg Germann, John Goodman, Arsenio Hall	Patti LaBelle
TBA	October 25, 2000	Brendan Fraser	Matchbox Twenty
Battlebots
TBA	October 26, 2000	Emeril Lagasse, Christian Slater	Foo Fighters
TBA	October 27, 2000	Queen Latifah, John Travolta	3 Doors Down
TBA	October 30, 2000	Joan Allen, George W. Bush	Charlotte Church, Billy Gilman
TBA	October 31, 2000	Al Gore, Martin Sheen	The Wallflowers

=== November ===
No.	Original release date	Guest(s)	Musical/entertainment guest(s)
TBA	November 1, 2000	Val Kilmer, Nigel Marven	A Perfect Circle
TBA	November 2, 2000	Ellen DeGeneres	Dwight Yoakam
TBA	November 3, 2000	David Spade	Baha Men
TBA	November 6, 2000	Gillian Anderson, Portia de Rossi	Mya
TBA	November 8, 2000	Cuba Gooding Jr., Molly Shannon	Aimee Mann
TBA	November 9, 2000	Jim Carrey	Hootie and the Blowfish
TBA	November 10, 2000	Ron Howard, Johnny Knoxville	Green Day
TBA	November 13, 2000	Mitch Fatel, Taylor Momsen, cast of The View (Joy Behar, Star Jones, Lisa Ling, Barbara Walters)	N/A
TBA	November 14, 2000	Steve Irwin, Tobey Maguire	Natalie Cole
TBA	November 15, 2000	Martha Stewart, Charlize Theron	Allison Moorer
TBA	November 16, 2000	Ben Affleck, Rodney Dangerfield	P.O.D.
TBA	November 17, 2000	David Alan Grier, Adam Sandler	The Smashing Pumpkins
TBA	November 20, 2000	Kelsey Grammer, Jamie Oliver	Joe Cocker
TBA	November 21, 2000	Arnold Schwarzenegger, Jeffrey Tambor	Sade
TBA	November 22, 2000	Lennox Lewis, Chris O’Donnell	N/A
Kids celebrate Thanksgiving
TBA	November 23, 2000	Tom Arnold	Gumboots
TBA	November 24, 2000	Dylan McDermott	N/A
TBA	November 27, 2000	Geena Davis	Cast of The Lion King
TBA	November 28, 2000	Rob Lowe, Gabrielle Reece, David Schwimmer	Mark Knopfler
TBA	November 29, 2000	Sally Field	NSYNC
TBA	November 30, 2000	Doc Antle, Sean Connery	Erykah Badu

=== December ===
No.	Original release date	Guest(s)	Musical/entertainment guest(s)
TBA	December 1, 2000	Russell Crowe, Molly Sims, Christopher Titus	Sevendust feat. Mark McGrath
TBA	December 11, 2000	Hallie Eisenberg, Ted Koppel, Christopher Titus	Sting
TBA	December 12, 2000	Greg Kinnear, M. Night Shyamalan	Ricky Martin
TBA	December 13, 2000	Sandra Bullock, Ashton Kutcher, Seann William Scott	Jewel
TBA	December 14, 2000	Mel Gibson, Marie Rudisill	Boys Choir of Harlem
TBA	December 15, 2000	Claudia Schiffer, Kevin Sorbo	Moby
TBA	December 18, 2000	Téa Leoni, Giovanni Ribisi	Jon Bon Jovi
TBA	December 19, 2000	Nicolas Cage, Alexandra Stewart	Dwight Yoakam
TBA	December 20, 2000	Jennifer Esposito, Bill Paxton	Aaron Neville
TBA	December 21, 2000	Cate Blanchett, William H. Macy	Seal
TBA	December 22, 2000	Penélope Cruz, Julie Scardina	N/A
TBA	December 26, 2000	Ashleigh Banfield, Richard Simmons	Shaggy
TBA	December 27, 2000	Rachael Leigh Cook, Billy Bob Thornton	Fisher
TBA	December 28, 2000	Tom Selleck, Fred Willard	Evan and Jaron
TBA	December 29, 2000	Tom Brokaw, Marla Sokoloff	Sammy Hagar

== 2001 ==
=== January ===
No.	Original release date	Guest(s)	Musical/entertainment guest(s)
9.1	January 1, 2001	President-elect George W. Bush, Joan Allen	Charlotte Church
9.2	January 2, 2001	Willem Dafoe, Chris Elliott, Kent Kasper	Keb' Mo'
9.3	January 3, 2001	Bob Newhart, Megan Mullally	N/A
9.4	January 4, 2001	Tom Hanks, Julia Stiles	Collective Soul
9.5	January 5, 2001	Milla Jovovich, Richard Lewis	Art Alexakis
9.6	January 8, 2001	Dennis Franz, Van Morrison	N/A
9.7	January 9, 2001	Eddie Izzard, Renée Zellweger	OutKast
9.8	January 10, 2001	George Clooney, Tracey Ullman	N/A
9.9	January 11, 2001	Kevin Costner, Michelle Yeoh	N/A
9.10	January 12, 2001	Ryan Phillippe, Catherine Zeta-Jones	N/A
9.11	January 16, 2001	Chris Matthews, Donal Logue	Shelby Lynne
9.12	January 17, 2001	Benicio del Toro, Hilary Swank	Jill Scott
9.13	January 18, 2001	Erika Christensen, Guy Ritchie	N/A
9.14	January 19, 2001	Dog walker Rick D'Elia, Wayne Previdi	N/A
9.15	January 22, 2001	Jon Gruden	Sting
9.16	January 23, 2001	Conan O'Brien, Mena Suvari	N/A
9.17	January 24, 2001	Drew Carey, Sean Patrick Thomas	N/A
9.18	January 25, 2001	Jennifer Lopez, Freddie Prinze Jr.	N/A
9.19	January 26, 2001	Matthew McConaughey, Hal Sparks	Snoop Dogg
9.20	January 29, 2001	Jimmy Carter, Steven Wright	Fuel
9.21	January 30, 2001	Geena Davis, Steven Wright	N/A

=== February ===
No.	Original release date	Guest(s)	Musical/entertainment guest(s)
TBA	February 1, 2001	Brad Pitt	Beck
TBA	February 2, 2001	Cindy Crawford, Trent Dilfer	Green Day
TBA	February 5, 2001	Jason Biggs, Ted Koppel	They Might Be Giants
TBA	February 6, 2001	Rob Lowe	LeAnn Rimes
TBA	February 7, 2001	Elton John	Billy Joel
TBA	February 8, 2001	Gisele Bündchen, Chris Rock	TBA
TBA	February 9, 2001	Pamela Anderson, Cedric the Entertainer	Deftones
TBA	February 12, 2001	Gary Oldman, Steve Zahn	Enya
TBA	February 13, 2001	Jennifer Aniston, Gisele Bündchen, Ricky Martin	Christina Aguilera
TBA	February 14, 2001	Andy MacDonald, Charlize Theron, Phil Tag	TBA
TBA	February 15, 2001	LynnMarie, Keanu Reeves	TBA
TBA	February 16, 2001	Arsenio Hall	98 Degrees
TBA	February 19, 2001	Bhagavan Antle, Bill Maher	Dido
TBA	February 20, 2001	Adam Carolla, Courteney Cox, Jimmy Kimmel	Gloria Estefan
TBA	February 21, 2001	Elsa Benitez, Carrot Top	TBA
TBA	February 22, 2001	Carson Daly	3 Doors Down
TBA	February 23, 2001	Jessica Alba, Kathie Lee Gifford	Eliades Ochoa
TBA	February 26, 2001	Debra Messing	Jamie O'Neal
TBA	February 27, 2001	Heidi Klum	Dolly Parton
TBA	February 28, 2001	Ben Affleck	Rod Stewart

=== March ===
No.	Original release date	Guest(s)	Musical/entertainment guest(s)
TBA	March 1, 2001	Haley Joel Osment	Chris Isaak
TBA	March 2, 2001	Ed Harris, Lauren Holly	Joe, Mystikal
TBA	March 5, 2001	Catherine Zeta-Jones, Ryan Phillippe	Common, Macy Gray
TBA	March 12, 2001	Johnny Knoxville, Lorraine Bracco	Rodney Crowell
TBA	March 13, 2001	David Arquette, Howie Mandel	Los Super Seven
TBA	March 14, 2001	Heather Graham, Stone Cold Steve Austin	Supersonic
TBA	March 15, 2001	Rodney Dangerfield	Keith Urban
TBA	March 16, 2001	Jennifer Love Hewitt	Backstreet Boys
TBA	March 19, 2001	Ashley Judd, Steven Weber	Merle Haggard
TBA	March 20, 2001	Sigourney Weaver, Colin Hanks	Richard Marx, Alison Krauss
TBA	March 21, 2001	Steven Seagal, D. L. Hughley	The Corrs
TBA	March 22, 2001	Rob Schneider, Evan Nagao	N/A
TBA	March 23, 2001	Pierce Brosnan	Tantric
TBA	March 26, 2001	Sylvester Stallone	Lionel Richie
TBA	March 27, 2001	Paul Reubens, Phil Jackson	Shawn Colvin
TBA	March 28, 2001	Penélope Cruz, Bill O'Reilly	Lifehouse
TBA	March 29, 2001	Jamie Lee Curtis	David Copperfield
TBA	March 30, 2001	Renee Zellweger	Incubus

=== April ===
No.	Original release date	Guest(s)	Musical/entertainment guest(s)
TBA	April 1, 2001	Joan Cusack, Julie Scardina	TBA
TBA	April 3, 2001	Trey Parker, Martin Sheen, Matt Stone	Pete Yorn
TBA	April 4, 2001	Tom Dreesen, Jada Pinkett Smith, Jason Sehorn	TBA
TBA	April 5, 2001	Tara Reid, Judy Sheindlin	112
TBA	April 6, 2001	Marcia Gay Harden, Freddie Sato	Melanie C
TBA	April 9, 2001	Rachael Leigh Cook, Whoopi Goldberg	Trick Daddy, KC and The Sunshine Band
TBA	April 10, 2001	Jane Kaczmarek, Joe Pantoliano	Lee Ann Womack
TBA	April 11, 2001	Shaquille O'Neal, Anne Robinson	India Arie
TBA	April 12, 2001	Troy Aikman, Kim Delaney, Kirk Franklin	Mary Mary
TBA	April 13, 2001	David Spade	Buckcherry
TBA	April 16, 2001	Jamie-Lynn Sigler	TBA
TBA	April 17, 2001	Mark Cuban, Camryn Manheim	Steve Tyrell
TBA	April 18, 2001	Rosario Dawson, Darrell Hammond	Uncle Kracker
TBA	April 19, 2001	Neve Campbell, Jim Shekhdar	Mark Gross
TBA	April 20, 2001	Lauren Graham, Darrell Hammond	Case
TBA	April 23, 2001	Melissa Joan Hart, Paul Reiser	Vonda Shepard
TBA	April 24, 2001	Tom Cotter, Charlie Sheen	Aaron Carter
TBA	April 25, 2001	Lolita Davidovich, Bill Maher	TBA
TBA	April 26, 2001	Janet Jackson	Robbie Williams
TBA	April 27, 2001	George Carlin, Hasim Rahman	TBA
TBA	April 30, 2001	Brendan Fraser, Spencer Tunick	Eve

=== May ===
No.	Original release date	Guest(s)	Musical/entertainment guest(s)
TBA	May 1, 2001	Dwayne Johnson	TBA
TBA	May 2, 2001	Cuba Gooding Jr.	TBA
TBA	May 3, 2001	Heidi Klum, Prince	Prince
TBA	May 4, 2001	Jessica Alba, Kathie Lee Gifford	Eliades Ochoa
TBA	May 7, 2001	Heather Locklear, Frankie Muniz	The Go Go's
TBA	May 8, 2001	Charles Barkley, Dylan McDermott	Tadpole Triplett
TBA	May 9, 2001	Melanie Griffith, David Willey	Fuel
TBA	May 10, 2001	Calista Flockhart	The Black Crowes
TBA	May 11, 2001	Jeremy McGrath, Christopher Titus	Everlast, Joseph Simmons
TBA	May 14, 2001	Macaulay Culkin, Ronnie Dunn	Kix Brooks
TBA	May 15, 2001	TBA	Aterciopelados
TBA	May 16, 2001	Nicole Kidman	Dwight Yoakam
TBA	May 17, 2001	Gisele Bündchen, Steve Irwin	Jennifer Lopez
TBA	May 18, 2001	Gisele Bündchen	Billy Idol
TBA	May 21, 2001	Rob Schneider	Dave Matthews Band
TBA	May 22, 2001	Sarah Fisher, Colleen Haskell, Martin Lawrence	Brian Wilson
TBA	May 23, 2001	Ben Affleck	Poe
TBA	May 24, 2001	Josh Hartnett, Steve Nave	City High
TBA	May 25, 2001	David Duchovny, Kate Beckinsale	Goo Goo Dolls
TBA	May 29, 2001	Sally Field	*NSYNC

=== June ===
No.	Original release date	Guest(s)	Musical/entertainment guest(s)
TBA	June 4, 2001	Jaime King, John Travolta	Train
TBA	June 5, 2001	Hugh Jackman	Blues Traveler
TBA	June 6, 2001	Kirsten Dunst, Guy Torry	Ben Harper
TBA	June 7, 2001	Will Ferrell, Brady Barr, Rob Schneider	Jessica Simpson
TBA	June 8, 2001	Alicia Silverstone, Mick Foley	The Cult
TBA	June 11, 2001	Angelina Jolie, Kevin Nealon	Brian Setzer
TBA	June 12, 2001	Jenna Elfman	Seven Mary Three
9.108	June 13, 2001	George Karl, Lucy Lawless	Green Day
TBA	June 14, 2001	Martin Short	Missy Elliott, Nelly Furtado
TBA	June 15, 2001	Jude Law, Brooke Shields	Dido
TBA	June 18, 2001	Tom Cavanagh, Chi McBride, Haley Joel Osment	Melissa Etheridge
9.112	June 19, 2001	Phil Jackson, Michelle Rodriguez	Dave Navarro
TBA	June 20, 2001	Shaquille O'Neal, Erik Weihenmayer	Luther Vandross
TBA	June 21, 2001	Arsenio Hall, Julie Scardina	TBA
TBA	June 22, 2001	Vin Diesel	Alicia Keys
TBA	June 25, 2001	Roger Ebert, Richard Roeper, Reese Witherspoon	Lifehouse
TBA	June 26, 2001	Maria Bamford, Jet Li	Tyrese Gibson
TBA	June 27, 2001	James Woods	Nickel Creek
TBA	June 28, 2001	Kobe Bryant, Pat Croce, William H. Macy	TBA
TBA	June 29, 2001	John McCain, Keenan Ivory Wayans	TBA

=== July ===
No.	Original release date	Guest(s)	Musical/entertainment guest(s)
TBA	July 20, 2001	Darrell Hammond	Craig David
TBA	July 23, 2001	D.L. Hughley	*NSYNC
TBA	July 24, 2001	Michael Clarke Duncan	Mary Chapin Carpenter
TBA	July 25, 2001	Roy Jones Jr., Bill Maher	Aaliyah
TBA	July 26, 2001	Jackie Chan, Estella Warren	Alan Jackson
TBA	July 27, 2001	Antonio Banderas, Wanda Sykes	TBA
TBA	July 30, 2001	Tara Reid, Chris Tucker	TBA
TBA	July 31, 2001	Arsenio Hall	Blu Cantrell

=== August ===
No.	Original release date	Guest(s)	Musical/entertainment guest(s)
TBA	August 1, 2001	Laurence Fishburne	Lucinda Williams
TBA	August 2, 2001	Andie MacDowell, Breckin Meyer	Nelly Furtado
TBA	August 3, 2001	Tim Roth, Nicole Sullivan	TBA
TBA	August 6, 2001	Charlize Theron, Serena Williams, Venus Williams	TBA
TBA	August 7, 2001	Caroline Rhea, Seann William Scott	TBA
TBA	August 8, 2001	Jason Biggs	Better Than Ezra
TBA	August 9, 2001	Molly Shannon, Bradley Whitford	Mandy Moore
TBA	August 10, 2001	Cuba Gooding Jr., Anne Hathaway	TBA
TBA	August 13, 2001	Penélope Cruz, Christopher Lowell	Usher
TBA	August 14, 2001	Wayne Brady, Jesse Ventura	k.d. lang
TBA	August 15, 2001	Terry Bradshaw, Nicole Kidman	Shaggy
TBA	August 16, 2001	Nicolas Cage, Russell Crowe	TBA
TBA	August 17, 2001	Rodney Dangerfield, Jules Sylvester	Jagged Edge
TBA	August 20, 2001	Josh Hartnett	Stevie Nicks, Sheryl Crow
9.143	August 21, 2001	Andy Richter	The Monkees
TBA	August 22, 2001	Freddie Prinze Jr.	Mary J. Blige
TBA	August 23, 2001	Whoopi Goldberg, Shannon Elizabeth	Willa Ford
TBA	August 24, 2001	Jarod Miller, Chris Klein	Five for Fighting

=== September ===
No.	Original release date	Guest(s)	Musical/entertainment guest(s)
TBA	September 3, 2001	Arsenio Hall, Julie Scardina	N/A
TBA	September 4, 2001	Jennifer Aniston, Dane Cook	Snoop Dogg and The Eastsidaz
TBA	September 5, 2001	Mark Wahlberg, Anthony Anderson	The Isley Brothers
TBA	September 6, 2001	Kelsey Grammer, Howie Mandel	Don Henley, Trisha Yearwood
TBA	September 7, 2001	Tom Hanks	N/A
TBA	September 10, 2001	Keanu Reeves, Aisha Tyler	Babyface
Headlines
TBA	September 11, 2001	Charlie Sheen	Gillian Welsh
Headlines. Episode never aired due to September 11 terrorist attacks.
TBA	September 12, 2001	David Spade	Jamiroquai
Episode never aired due to September 11 terrorist attacks.
TBA	September 18, 2001	John McCain	Crosby, Stills and Nash
TBA	September 19, 2001	Arnold Schwarzenegger	PJ Harvey
Exotic Birds with Jon Guenther
TBA	September 21, 2001	Leelee Sobieski	Cake
TBA	September 24, 2001	Alyssa Milano, Emeril Lagasse	Diana Krall
Headlines
TBA	September 25, 2001	David Spade, Daunte Culpepper	N/A
TBA	September 26, 2001	Megan Mullally	Train
TBA	September 27, 2001	Cuba Gooding Jr., David Willey	Live
TBA	September 28, 2001	John Travolta	Aaron Neville

=== October ===
No.	Original release date	Guest(s)	Musical/entertainment guest(s)
TBA	October 1, 2001	Denzel Washington	Cyndi Thomson
TBA	October 2, 2001	Drew Carey, Maria Bartiromo	The Lion King
TBA	October 3, 2001	Samuel L. Jackson, Mavis Leno	Eagle Eye Cherry
TBA	October 4, 2001	Tim Allen, Jennifer Esposito	Charlotte Church
TBA	October 5, 2001	Michael Douglas, Jessica Alba	P.O.D.
TBA	October 8, 2001	Jenna Elfman, Breckin Meyer	Nickelback
Headlines
TBA	October 9, 2001	Doug Flutie, Billy Bob Thornton	James Taylor
TBA	October 10, 2001	Madeleine Albright	Lit
TBA	October 11, 2001	Britney Spears, Terry Bradshaw	N/A
TBA	October 12, 2001	Jennifer Garner, James Woods	Ozzy Osbourne
TBA	October 16, 2001	Jet Li, Jill Hennessy	Craig David
TBA	October 17, 2001	Salma Hayek, Hayden Christensen	N/A
TBA	October 18, 2001	Heather Graham, Daryl Hannah	Bush
TBA	October 19, 2001	Bill O'Reilly, Kevin Spacey	Björk
TBA	October 29, 2001	John Travolta, Dale Earnhardt Jr.	Alien Ant Farm
Headlines
TBA	October 30, 2001	Gwyneth Paltrow, William H. Macy	Lenny Kravitz
TBA	October 31, 2001	Hank Azaria, David Lynch	Remy Zero

=== November ===
No.	Original release date	Guest(s)	Musical/entertainment guest(s)
TBA	November 1, 2001	Drew Barrymore, Ashton Kutcher	Sugar Ray
TBA	November 2, 2001	Rob Schneider, Shannon Elizabeth	Enrique Iglesias
TBA	November 5, 2001	Sarah Michelle Gellar	N/A
Headlines
TBA	November 6, 2001	Dennis Miller	Enya
TBA	November 7, 2001	Kevin Kline	P.Diddy
TBA	November 8, 2001	Julie Scardina, Rob Schneider	Enya
Sea World Animals
TBA	November 9, 2001	Kathie Lee Gifford	Louis C.K.
TBA	November 12, 2001	Kiefer Sutherland	Garth Brooks
Headlines
TBA	November 13, 2001	Rosie Perez, Chris Matthews	Jewel
TBA	November 14, 2001	Gisele Bündchen, Jack Welch	Tori Amos
TBA	November 15, 2001	TBA	Shakira
TBA	November 16, 2001	Courtney Thorne-Smith, Bob Middleton	Maxwell
TBA	November 19, 2001	Kevin James, Deion Sanders	Lindsey Richter
Headlines
TBA	November 20, 2001	John Stamos, Lauren Graham	Marc Anthony
TBA	November 21, 2001	Rodney Dangerfield, Brittany Murphy	N/A
TBA	November 22, 2001	Pamela Anderson	U2
TBA	November 23, 2001	Hilary Swank, Greg Norman	Smash Mouth
TBA	November 26, 2001	Alyssa Milano, Joe Rogan	Jill Scott
TBA	November 27, 2001	Eric McCormack, Jeri Ryan	Ryan Adams
TBA	November 28, 2001	Nigel Marven, Ewan McGregor	Natalie Merchant
TBA	November 29, 2001	Casey Affleck, Cindy Crawford	Incubus
TBA	November 30, 2001	Arsenio Hall	Mary J. Blige

=== December ===
No.	Original release date	Guest(s)	Musical/entertainment guest(s)
TBA	December 3, 2001	Benjamin Bratt	Creed
TBA	December 4, 2001	Matt Damon, Brad Pitt	Busta Rhymes
TBA	December 5, 2001	George Clooney, Kenny Hodgkins	R. Kelly
TBA	December 6, 2001	Jennifer Connelly, Norman Schwarzkopf Jr.	Melissa Etheridge
TBA	December 7, 2001	Penélope Cruz, Bernie Mac	Pink
TBA	December 10, 2001	Tom Cruise	Elton John
TBA	December 11, 2001	Hugh Jackman, Lennox Lewis	Alicia Keys
TBA	December 12, 2001	Meg Ryan, Bob Dole	Garbage
TBA	December 13, 2001	Russell Crowe, Roger Ebert, Richard Roeper	Sting
TBA	December 14, 2001	Cameron Diaz, Luke Wilson	Macy Gray
TBA	December 17, 2001	Will Smith	Neil Diamond
TBA	December 18, 2001	Charles Barkley, Cokie Roberts	Yolanda Adams
TBA	December 19, 2001	Shannen Doherty	The Nutcrakers
TBA	December 20, 2001	Wolfgang Puck	Lit
TBA	December 21, 2001	Halle Berry, Bob Marley	The Paulist Choristers of California
TBA	December 26, 2001	Maria Bamford, Jamie Foxx	Alien Ant Farm
TBA	December 27, 2001	Jules Sylvester, Billy Bob Thornton	Barry Manilow
TBA	December 28, 2001	Elijah Wood	Tantric
TBA	December 31, 2001	Chris Isaak, Bill Maher	Blue Man Group

== 2002 ==
=== January ===
No.	Original release date	Guest(s)	Musical/entertainment guest(s)
TBA	January 1, 2002	Kelly Ripa, John Ritter	Adema
TBA	January 2, 2002	Kevin Spacey	Jamie O'Neal
TBA	January 3, 2002	Colin Hanks, Ron Howard	TBA
TBA	January 4, 2002	Richard Gere, Catherine O'Hara	Ja Rule
TBA	January 14, 2002	David Feldman, Jennifer Garner	Usher
TBA	January 15, 2002	Cedric the Entertainer, Calista Flockhart	Rufus Wainwright
TBA	January 16, 2002	Rudy Giuliani, Angie Harmon	India Arie
TBA	January 17, 2002	Megan Mullally	Enya
TBA	January 18, 2002	Nicole Kidman, Ryan Phillippe	Michelle Branch
TBA	January 21, 2002	Tony Hawk, Sarah Jessica Parker, Michael Penn	Aimee Mann
TBA	January 22, 2002	Nick Swardson, Kate Winslet, Earl Scruggs	Dwight Yoakam
TBA	January 23, 2002	James Carville, Robin Williams	Ludacris
TBA	January 24, 2002	Phil McGraw, Michelle Pfeiffer	Chuck Berry, Little Richard
TBA	January 25, 2002	Debra Messing, Jerry Rice	The Calling
TBA	January 28, 2002	James Belushi, Sissy Spacek	Josh Groban
TBA	January 29, 2002	Drew Carey, Jaime King	Barry Manilow
TBA	January 30, 2002	Dakota Fanning, Matt LeBlanc	Outkast
TBA	January 31, 2002	Roger Ebert, Richard Roeper, Ben Stiller	TBA

=== February ===
No.	Original release date	Guest(s)	Musical/entertainment guest(s)
TBA	February 1, 2002	Jimmy Pardo, Marisa Tomei	David Willey
TBA	February 2, 2002	Arnold Schwarzenegger	Kylie Minogue
TBA	February 5, 2002	Howie Mandel, Rebecca Romijn	Willie Nelson
TBA	February 6, 2002	Jillian Barberie, David Spade	Default
TBA	February 7, 2002	Jon Bon Jovi, Bernie Mac	Pete Yorn
TBA	February 11, 2002	Laura Bush	Britney Spears
TBA	February 12, 2002	Kevin Costner	TBA
TBA	February 14, 2002	Denzel Washington	TBA
TBA	February 20, 2002	Mel Gibson	Marc Anthony
TBA	February 21, 2002	Tristan Gale, Bill Maher, Lea Ann Parsley, Jennifer Rodriguez, Tara Lipinski	TBA
TBA	February 25, 2002	Greg Camp, Sean Combs, Julia Louis-Dreyfus, Jim Shea	Busta Rhymes
TBA	February 26, 2002	Apolo Ohno, Jon Stewart	Ryan Adams
TBA	February 27, 2002	Heidi Klum, Kevin Smith	Norah Jones
TBA	February 28, 2002	Michelle Kwan, Chris Tucker	TBA

=== March ===
No.	Original release date	Guest(s)	Musical/entertainment guest(s)
TBA	March 1, 2002	Pamela Anderson, Chris Klein	Union Station & The Soggy Bottom Boys
TBA	March 4, 2002	Heather Locklear, Guy Pearce	Chris Isaak
TBA	March 5, 2002	Denis Leary, Sarah Paulson	Alejandro Sanz
TBA	March 6, 2002	Ron Howard, Steve Irwin	The Blind Boys of Alabama
TBA	March 7, 2002	Ben Curtis, Rene Russo	Natalie Imbruglia
TBA	March 8, 2002	Rachel Griffiths, Will Smith	Ben Harper
TBA	March 11, 2002	Kim Delaney, Christopher Titus	Kirk Franklin
TBA	March 13, 2002	Jennifer Connelly, John Leguizamo	John Mayer
TBA	March 14, 2002	Tom Green, Julie Scardina	Jewel
TBA	March 15, 2002	Goldie Hawn, Daniel Gómez Rinaldi	Jack Johnson
TBA	March 25, 2002	Roger Ebert, Richard Roeper, Arsenio Hall	TBA
TBA	March 26, 2002	Jodie Foster, Janet Reno	Faith Evans
TBA	March 27, 2002	Dennis Quaid	Dwight Yoakam
TBA	March 28, 2002	Sally Field	Brandy Norwood
TBA	March 29, 2002	Ozzy Osbourne, Sharon Osbourne, Jack Osbourne, Kelly Osbourne, Andy Richter, Roni Size	Cypress Hill

=== April ===
No.	Original release date	Guest(s)	Musical/entertainment guest(s)
TBA	April 1, 2002	Bill Paxton, Tara Reid	Nappy Roots
TBA	April 2, 2002	Tim Allen, Irv Gordon	John Ondrasik
TBA	April 3, 2002	Rhys Ifans, Ashley Judd	Tweet
TBA	April 4, 2002	Bobby Knight, Julia Louis-Dreyfus	Alanis Morissette
TBA	April 5, 2002	Christina Applegate, Eddie Izzard	Goo Goo Dolls
TBA	April 8, 2002	Shawn Colvin, Greta Van Susteren, Damon Wayans	Chris Botti
TBA	April 9, 2002	Louis C.K., Samuel L. Jackson	Avant
TBA	April 10, 2002	Michael Essany, Mira Sorvino	Drowning Pool
TBA	April 11, 2002	Ben Affleck, Aisha Tyler	Shakira
TBA	April 12, 2002	Kirsten Dunst, John C. McGinley	Vanessa Carlton
TBA	April 15, 2002	Ethan Hawke, Emeril Lagasse	Sense Field
TBA	April 16, 2002	Dwayne Johnson, Chris Matthews	Glenn Lewis
TBA	April 17, 2002	Michael Clark Duncan, Barry Humphries	Nick Cave and The Bad Seeds
TBA	April 18, 2002	Adam Ferrara, Richard Gere	Enrique Iglesias
TBA	April 19, 2002	Katie Couric, DJ Qualls	Hoobastank
TBA	April 22, 2002	Val Kilmer, Jennifer Tilly	Jimmy Eat World
TBA	April 23, 2002	Fran Drescher	Shannon McNally
TBA	April 24, 2002	Eric McCormack, Stevie Starr	Ashanti
TBA	April 25, 2002	Jennifer Love Hewitt, Eugene Levy, Liz Phair	Sheryl Crow
TBA	April 26, 2002	Sheryl Crow, Bobby Lee, Christina Ricci	Stevie Nicks, Natalie Maines
TBA	April 29, 2002	David Duchovny, Ari Fleischer	Brooks & Dunn
TBA	April 30, 2002	Darrell Hammond	Michael Bolton

=== May ===
No.	Original release date	Guest(s)	Musical/entertainment guest(s)
TBA	May 1, 2002	Bhagavan Antle, Willem Dafoe	Michelle Branch
TBA	May 2, 2002	Edward Burns, Lauren Graham	Re:
TBA	May 3, 2002	TBA	Paul McCartney
TBA	May 6, 2002	Sean "Diddy" Combs, Tobey Maguire	Usher
TBA	May 7, 2002	Carole King	Louise Goffin
TBA	May 8, 2002	Tom Green, David Willey	Unwritten Law
TBA	May 9, 2002	Jamie Oliver, Kiefer Sutherland, Eliza Dushku	Neil Young
TBA	May 10, 2002	Hayden Christensen	Remy Shand
TBA	May 13, 2002	Magic Johnson, Noah Wyle	Diana Krall
TBA	May 14, 2002	TBA	Dave Matthews Band
TBA	May 15, 2002	Jules Sylvester, Reese Witherspoon	The Calling
TBA	May 16, 2002	Ewan McGregor, Billy Bob Thornton	The Maloof Brothers
TBA	May 17, 2002	Dave Chappelle	Marc Anthony
TBA	May 20, 2002	Bill O'Reilly, Freddie Prinze Jr.	Bryan Adams
TBA	May 21, 2002	Hugh Grant	Céline Dion
TBA	May 22, 2002	Robin Williams	Tommy Lee
TBA	May 23, 2002	Ben Affleck, Denise Richards	Jimmy Buffett
TBA	May 24, 2002	Neve Campbell, Mekhi Phifer	Willie Nelson, Lee Ann Womack

=== June ===
No.	Original release date	Guest(s)	Musical/entertainment guest(s)
TBA	June 3, 2002	Bernie Mac, Bridget Moynahan	Garbage
TBA	June 4, 2002	Pablo Francisco, Ashley Judd	Meshell Ndegeocello
TBA	June 5, 2002	Noah Gray-Cabey, Adam Sandler	Abandoned Pools
TBA	June 6, 2002	Matt Damon, Nia Vardalos	Avril Lavigne
TBA	June 7, 2002	James Garner, Mike Bibby, Chris Webber	No Doubt
TBA	June 10, 2002	Franka Potente, Martin Short	Ralph Stanley
TBA	June 11, 2002	Nicolas Cage, Mary-Kate and Ashley Olsen	Paul Westerberg
TBA	June 12, 2002	Colin Farrell, D. L. Hughley	Dirty Vegas
TBA	June 13, 2002	Matt LeBlanc, Julie Scardina	The Strokes
TBA	June 14, 2002	Rick Fox, Liev Schreiber	Chris Isaak
TBA	June 17, 2002	Edie Falco	Wyclef Jean
TBA	June 18, 2002	Ali Landry, Dennis Miller	Paulina Rubio
TBA	June 19, 2002	Greg Behrendt, Jamie Lee Curtis	Alanis Morissette
TBA	June 20, 2002	Tom Cruise	Natalie Merchant
TBA	June 21, 2002	Greg Behrendt, Sarah Michelle Gellar	Bonnie Raitt
TBA	June 24, 2002	Johnny Knoxville, Wanda Sykes	Anastacia
TBA	June 25, 2002	Tommy Lee Jones	Kevin Smith
TBA	June 26, 2002	Rosario Dawson, Tom Green	Trey Anastasio
TBA	June 27, 2002	Roger Ebert, Richard Roeper, Will Smith	Papa Roach
TBA	June 28, 2002	Lara Flynn Boyle, Steve Irwin	Nelly

=== July ===
No.	Original release date	Guest(s)	Musical/entertainment guest(s)
TBA	July 8, 2002	Geraldo Rivera, Michelle Williams	Bryan Ferry
TBA	July 9, 2002	Jeff Corwin, William H. Macy	New Found Glory
TBA	July 10, 2002	Barry Bonds, Tom Hanks	Lyle Lovett
TBA	July 11, 2002	Shaquille O'Neal	TBA
TBA	July 12, 2002	Phil McGraw	Kylie Minogue
TBA	July 15, 2002	Simon Cowell, Harrison Ford	Bruce Hornsby
TBA	July 16, 2002	David Arquette, Amy Grant, Natasha Henstridge	Vince Gill
TBA	July 17, 2002	Melanie Griffith	TBA
TBA	July 18, 2002	Dana Carvey, Shad Moss	Dropline
TBA	July 19, 2002	Tyler Hoechlin, Martin Lawrence	Outkast
TBA	July 22, 2002	Michael Caine, Tina Fey	TBA
TBA	July 23, 2002	David Hyde Pierce	Beyoncé
TBA	July 24, 2002	Sarah Silverman, Christian Slater	John Pizzarelli
TBA	July 25, 2002	Mike Myers	Jewel
TBA	July 26, 2002	Antonio Banderas	Goo Goo Dolls
TBA	July 29, 2002	Portia de Rossi, Dennis Miller	La'Myia Good
TBA	July 30, 2002	Fred Savage, Mark Schweizer	Norah Jones
TBA	July 31, 2002	Joleen Lutz, Dennis Miller	Alice Cooper

=== August ===
No.	Original release date	Guest(s)	Musical/entertainment guest(s)
11.98	August 1, 2002	Glenn Close, John Corbett, Samuel L. Jackson, Anna Kournikova	Alison Krauss
TBA	August 2, 2002	John Ashton, Matt LeBlanc	Counting Crows
TBA	August 5, 2002	Pete Correale, Vin Diesel	Tweet
TBA	August 6, 2002	Clint Eastwood, Gabriel Iglesias	Gavin Rossdale
TBA	August 7, 2002	Jennifer Aniston	Monica
TBA	August 8, 2002	John Heffron	Dolly Parton
TBA	August 9, 2002	Brian Dunkleman, Wesley Snipes	Marc Anthony
TBA	August 12, 2002	Tracy Morgan, Seann William Scott	Moby
TBA	August 13, 2002	Lauren Ambrose, Denis Leary	John Mayer
TBA	August 14, 2002	Matthew Perry, Michelle Rodriguez, Martin Sheen, Anna Nicole Smith	Snoop Dogg

=== September ===
No.	Original release date	Guest(s)	Musical/entertainment guest(s)
TBA	September 3, 2002	Dennis Miller	Box Car Racer
TBA	September 4, 2002	Ice Cube, Julie Scardina	Aimee Mann
TBA	September 5, 2002	Penn Badgley, Jimmy Fallon, Kelly Clarkson	Dixie Chicks
TBA	September 6, 2002	Jillian Barberie, Drew Carey, Teri Hatcher, Shaggy, Gene Simmons	Slipknot
TBA	September 9, 2002	Tom Green	Eve
TBA	September 10, 2002	George Foreman, Phil McGraw	Robert Plant
TBA	September 11, 2002	John McCain, James Woods	Goo Goo Dolls
TBA	September 12, 2002	Claire Danes, Robin Williams	Coldplay
TBA	September 13, 2002	Cedric The Entertainer, Heath Ledger	Lee Ann Womack
TBA	September 16, 2002	Jill Hennessy, Bernie Mac	Our Lady Peace
TBA	September 17, 2002	Penn Badgley, Ellen DeGeneres	Nickel Creek
TBA	September 18, 2002	Wayne Brady, Lucy Liu	Kenny G, Chanté Moore
TBA	September 19, 2002	Carson Daly, Goldie Hawn	Penn & Teller
TBA	September 20, 2002	Elon Gold, Kate Hudson	BBMak
TBA	September 23, 2002	Rosie O'Donnell	Kelly Clarkson
TBA	September 24, 2002	Maggie Gyllenhaal, Pete Sampras	Uncle Kracker
TBA	September 25, 2002	Brittany Snow, Darrell Hammond	TBA
TBA	September 26, 2002	Donnie Wahlberg	Jennifer Love Hewitt
TBA	September 27, 2002	Jennifer Garner, Jake Gyllenhaal	Erykah Badu
TBA	September 30, 2002	Nia Vardalos	Elvis Costello

=== October ===
No.	Original release date	Guest(s)	Musical/entertainment guest(s)
TBA	October 1, 2002	Zach Braff, Damon Wayans	Lifehouse
TBA	October 2, 2002	Jackie Chan, Oscar De La Hoya	Jackson Browne
TBA	October 3, 2002	Christina Applegate, Guy Ritchie	Michelle Branch
TBA	October 4, 2002	David Spade, James Van Der Beek	Queens of the Stone Age
TBA	October 7, 2002	Ralph Fiennes, Brad Garrett	LeAnn Rimes
TBA	October 8, 2002	Terry Bradshaw, Rusty Haight	Maná
TBA	October 9, 2002	Jamie Lee Curtis	Avril Lavigne
TBA	October 10, 2002	Alison Lohman, Jerry Seinfeld	Beck
TBA	October 11, 2002	William H. Macy, Jules Sylvester	Doves
TBA	October 14, 2002	Zooey Deschanel, Greg Kinnear	The Donnas
TBA	October 15, 2002	David Arquette	Tracy Chapman
TBA	October 16, 2002	Matt LeBlanc, Ashley Williams	Keith Urban
TBA	October 17, 2002	Joe Buck, Salma Hayek	Rod Stewart
TBA	October 18, 2002	Maryellen Hooper, Owen Wilson	OK Go
TBA	October 28, 2002	Kiefer Sutherland	Ryan Adams
TBA	October 29, 2002	Arnold Schwarzenegger	James Taylor
TBA	October 30, 2002	Bill Maher, Marilyn Manson	Shaggy
TBA	October 31, 2002	Tim Allen	Justin Timberlake

=== November ===
No.	Original release date	Guest(s)	Musical/entertainment guest(s)
TBA	November 1, 2002	Jamie Kennedy, Megan Mullally	Pink
TBA	November 4, 2002	Jim Belushi, Tony Bennett, Rebecca Romijn	k.d. lang
TBA	November 5, 2002	Bob Newhart, Serena Williams	Melissa Etheridge
TBA	November 6, 2002	Dennis Miller, Jennifer Schwalbach Smith	Nick Carter
TBA	November 7, 2002	Phil McGraw	Sixpence None the Richer
TBA	November 8, 2002	Pierce Brosnan, Sarah Silverman	Stone Sour
TBA	November 11, 2002	Halle Berry, Tim Russert	Kelly Rowland
TBA	November 12, 2002	Cedric the Entertainer	Bonnie Raitt
TBA	November 13, 2002	Rupert Grint, Adam Sandler	Tom Petty and the Heartbreakers
TBA	November 14, 2002	Emma Watson, Tiger Woods	Dave Matthews Band
TBA	November 15, 2002	Heidi Klum, Tony Siragusa	Vanessa Carlton
TBA	November 18, 2002	Pamela Anderson, Aaron Buerge	Busta Rhymes
TBA	November 19, 2002	Chris Matthews, Jarod Miller	David Copperfield
TBA	November 20, 2002	Kelly Osbourne, Sharon Osbourne, Mekhi Phifer	Ozzy Osbourne
TBA	November 21, 2002	Sean Hayes, Tom Ridge	Norah Jones
TBA	November 22, 2002	Rodney Dangerfield, Roger Ebert, Richard Roeper	Dwight Yoakam
TBA	November 25, 2002	Naomi Watts	Tim McGraw
TBA	November 26, 2002	Eddie Izzard, Don Rickles	Enrique Iglesias
TBA	November 27, 2002	Al Gore, Ryan Seacrest	Faith Hill
TBA	November 28, 2002	Rob Schneider	TBA
TBA	November 29, 2002	Martin Short, Mike Epps	TBA

=== December ===
No.	Original release date	Guest(s)	Musical/entertainment guest(s)
TBA	December 2, 2002	Peter Jennings, Carrot Top	Lifehouse
TBA	December 3, 2002	Howie Mandel	Bon Jovi
TBA	December 4, 2002	Spencer Breslin, Dennis Miller	John Mayer
TBA	December 5, 2002	Billy Crystal, Steve Schirripa	Alanis Morissette
TBA	December 6, 2002	Jamie Oliver, Denise Richards	Peter Gabriel
TBA	December 9, 2002	George Clooney, Julianna Margulies	TBA
TBA	December 10, 2002	Rudy Giuliani, George Lopez	Counting Crows
TBA	December 11, 2002	Dennis Quaid	Johnny Rzeznik
TBA	December 12, 2002	Bill Maher	The Wallflowers
TBA	December 13, 2002	Jennifer Garner, John C. Reilly	Prince
TBA	December 16, 2002	Julie Scardina, Elijah Wood	Jamia Simone Nash
TBA	December 17, 2002	Hugh Grant, Lee Ann Womack	Enrique Iglesias
TBA	December 18, 2002	Roberto Benigni, Jim Cramer	Phantom Planet
TBA	December 19, 2002	Sean Astin, Sandra Bullock	Brian Setzer
TBA	December 20, 2002	Cameron Diaz, Harland Williams	Kylie Minogue
TBA	December 23, 2002	Terry Bradshaw, Charlie Stewart	TBA
TBA	December 26, 2002	Tommy Davidson, Edward Norton	Tyrese Gibson
TBA	December 27, 2002	Nick Cannon, Darrell Hammond	Jackson Browne
TBA	December 30, 2002	Tom Selleck	Laura Pausini
TBA	December 31, 2002	Jay Mohr	Snoop Dogg

== 2003 ==
=== January ===
No.	Original release date	Guest(s)	Musical/entertainment guest(s)
TBA	January 2, 2003	Dane Cook, Brittany Murphy	Wes Harrison
TBA	January 3, 2003	Ashton Kutcher	Joan Osborne
TBA	January 13, 2003	Salma Hayek, Derek Luke	Seether
TBA	January 14, 2003	Barry Humphries, Nicole Kidman	Shania Twain
TBA	January 15, 2003	Denzel Washington	Elton John
TBA	January 16, 2003	Josh Brolin, Catherine Zeta-Jones	The Doors
TBA	January 17, 2003	Selma Blair, Robin Williams	Thirty Seconds to Mars
TBA	January 20, 2003	Richard Gere, Nia Vardalos	Solomon Burke
TBA	January 21, 2003	Julianne Moore, Ryan Seacrest	India Arie
TBA	January 22, 2003	Drew Barrymore, Adrien Brody	Nelly
TBA	January 23, 2003	Kevin Smith, Renée Zellweger	Sheryl Crow
TBA	January 24, 2003	George Clooney, Queen Latifah	Tonic
TBA	January 27, 2003	Heather Graham	Vivian Green
TBA	January 28, 2003	Colin Farrell, Jeff Goldblum	Santana
TBA	January 29, 2003	Michelle Branch, Dennis Miller	Santana
TBA	January 30, 2003	Vaughn Lowery, Elizabeth Mule	Goo Goo Dolls
TBA	January 31, 2003	Scott Foley, Oprah Winfrey	Raphael Saadiq

=== February ===
No.	Original release date	Guest(s)	Musical/entertainment guest(s)
TBA	February 3, 2003	Jackie Chan, Owen Wilson	The Blind Boys of Alabama
TBA	February 4, 2003	Arsenio Hall, Steve Irwin	Floetry
TBA	February 5, 2003	Jesse Ventura, Luke Wilson	Kasey Chambers
TBA	February 6, 2003	Phil McGraw, Molly Shannon	Dana Glover
TBA	February 7, 2003	Matthew Broderick, Joe Rogan	Susan Tedeschi
TBA	February 10, 2003	Michael Clarke Duncan	Coldplay
TBA	February 11, 2003	Tim Russert	Megan Mullally
TBA	February 12, 2003	Ben Affleck, Dave Chappelle	Lionel Richie
TBA	February 13, 2003	Will Ferrell, Kevin Spacey	The Calling
TBA	February 14, 2003	Evan Marriott, Matthew McConaughey	David Gray
TBA	February 17, 2003	Bill Maher	Kathleen Edwards
TBA	February 18, 2003	The View cast	The Ben Taylor Band
TBA	February 19, 2003	Petra Nemcova, Al Sharpton	Kalle Gustafsson
TBA	February 20, 2003	John Travolta	Interpol
TBA	February 21, 2003	Pamela Anderson, Sommore	Aaron Neville
TBA	February 24, 2003	Rosie Perez	Good Charlotte
TBA	February 25, 2003	Dennis Miller	t.A.T.u.
TBA	February 26, 2003	Nicolas Cage, Horatio Sanz	Lyle Lovett
TBA	February 27, 2003	Ellen DeGeneres, George Foreman	DMX
TBA	February 28, 2003	Michael C. Hall, Diane Lane	Jennifer Hanson

=== March ===
No.	Original release date	Guest(s)	Musical/entertainment guest(s)
TBA	March 3, 2003	Martin Scorsese	Hootie & the Blowfish
TBA	March 4, 2003	Christopher Walken	The Roots
TBA	March 5, 2003	Anthony Anderson, David Spade	Missy Elliott
TBA	March 6, 2003	Salma Hayek, Kevin Nealon	Evanescence
TBA	March 7, 2003	Daniel Dotterer, Catherine Zeta-Jones	Jesse Malin
TBA	March 10, 2003	Paula Abdul, Simon Cowell, Benicio Del Toro, Randy Jackson	Everclear
TBA	March 11, 2003	Gisele Bündchen, Michael Caine	Carol Leifer
TBA	March 12, 2003	Fran Drescher, Cuba Gooding Jr.	The Streets
TBA	March 13, 2003	Bill O'Reilly	Ringo Starr
TBA	March 14, 2003	Christina Applegate, Ashton Kutcher	Simple Plan
TBA	March 24, 2003	Roger Ebert, Richard Roeper, Wanda Sykes	Deana Carter
TBA	March 25, 2003	Chris Rock, Hilary Swank	Sean Paul
TBA	March 26, 2003	Adrien Brody	Vince Gill
TBA	March 27, 2003	Aisha Tyler, James Woods	Brian McKnight
TBA	March 28, 2003	Rachel Griffiths, Stevie Starr	Jaguares
TBA	March 31, 2003	Bill Paxton, Alex Rodriguez	Lucy Woodward

=== April ===
No.	Original release date	Guest(s)	Musical/entertainment guest(s)
TBA	April 1, 2003	Jillian Barberie, Tristan Jackson, Dorothy Lucey	Steve Edwards
TBA	April 2, 2003	Tom Arnold, Annika Sorenstam	The Wallflowers
TBA	April 3, 2003	Dennis Miller	Ibrahim Ferrer
TBA	April 4, 2003	Simon Cowell, Snoop Dogg	Tom Petty
TBA	April 7, 2003	Freddie Prinze Jr., Sarah Wynter	Lucinda Williams
TBA	April 8, 2003	Michael Douglas	TBA
TBA	April 9, 2003	TBA	Foo Fighters
TBA	April 10, 2003	TBA	Theory of a Deadman
TBA	April 11, 2003	Neal McDonough	TBA
TBA	April 14, 2003	Bob Costas, Julia Louis-Dreyfus	Kelly Clarkson
TBA	April 15, 2003	Dustin Hoffman	Maria McKee
TBA	April 16, 2003	Edward Burns	Tori Amos
TBA	April 17, 2003	Charles Barkley, Christopher Titus	Matchbox Twenty
TBA	April 18, 2003	John Cusack	Ziggy Marley
TBA	April 21, 2003	Hilary Duff, Arsenio Hall	Chantal Kreviazuk
TBA	April 22, 2003	Matt Dillon, Wanda Sykes	Blue Man Group
TBA	April 23, 2003	Bill Maher, Steve Marmel	Lindsey Buckingham
TBA	April 24, 2003	Sandra Bullock, David Russ	TBA
TBA	April 25, 2003	Arnold Schwarzenegger	Lou Reed
TBA	April 28, 2003	Hugh Jackman	Jimmy Buffett
TBA	April 29, 2003	Nigella Lawson	Céline Dion
TBA	April 30, 2003	Mary Tyler Moore, Dick Van Dyke	Zooey Deschanel

=== May ===
No.	Original release date	Guest(s)	Musical/entertainment guest(s)
TBA	May 1, 2003	Jarod Miller	Lisa Marie Presley
TBA	May 2, 2003	Reese Witherspoon, Steve Zahn	Ginuwine
TBA	May 5, 2003	Laurence Fishburne, Dobie Gray, Jamie Oliver	Uncle Kracker
TBA	May 6, 2003	Famke Janssen, Dennis Miller	Fabolous
TBA	May 7, 2003	Shia LaBeouf, Phil McGraw	India Arie
TBA	May 8, 2003	Gisele Bündchen, Shepard Smith	Unwritten Law
TBA	May 9, 2003	Richard Belzer, Katie Couric, Macaulay Culkin, Ewan McGregor	TBA
11.85	May 12, 2003	Katie Couric (guest host), Mike Myers, Simon Cowell, Kelly Rowland	Robbie Williams
Ask Katie Anything (Cause Jay's Not Here)
TBA	May 13, 2003	Yoko Ono, Shepard Smith	Ben Harper
TBA	May 14, 2003	Jerry Seinfeld	Third Eye Blind
TBA	May 15, 2003	Amanda Bynes, Jim Carrey	Tim McGraw
TBA	May 16, 2003	Andrew Firestone, David Spade	Busta Rhymes
TBA	May 19, 2003	Maurice Cheeks, Michael Douglas	Jason Mraz
TBA	May 20, 2003	Albert Brooks	The Thorns
TBA	May 21, 2003	Julie Scardina, Renée Zellweger	Staind
TBA	May 22, 2003	Geraldo Rivera, Ruben Studdard	Frankie J.
TBA	May 23, 2003	Jean-Sébastien Giguère, Colin Quinn,	Big Men Big Music

=== June ===
No.	Original release date	Guest(s)	Musical/entertainment guest(s)
TBA	June 3, 2003	Paul Walker	Jack Johnson
TBA	June 4, 2003	Harrison Ford, Jay Mohr	Terence Trent D'Arby
TBA	June 5, 2003	Terry Bradshaw, Eva Mendes	Eels
11.98	June 6, 2003	Charlize Theron, Chris Berman	Michelle Branch
Point - What's your point?
TBA	June 9, 2003	Kelly Clarkson, John Corbett, Branford Marsalis, Ellis Marsalis Jr.	Justin Guarini
TBA	June 10, 2003	Josh Hartnett, Patrick Robert O'Connor	Heart
TBA	June 11, 2003	Guy Pearce, Jesse Ventura	The All-American Rejects
TBA	June 12, 2003	Jennifer Aniston, Tyler Florence	Sugar Ray
TBA	June 13, 2003	Martin Short, Gavin Rossdale	Blue Man Group
TBA	June 16, 2003	Cedric the Entertainer, Kate Hudson	Cold
TBA	June 17, 2003	Eric Bana, Drew Barrymore	Justin Guarini
TBA	June 18, 2003	Bernie Mac	Dwight Yoakam
TBA	June 19, 2003	Lisa Kudrow, Mark Valley	Justin Timberlake
TBA	June 20, 2003	Karolina Kurkova, Matt LeBlanc	Pink
TBA	June 23, 2003	Jimmy Carr, Cameron Diaz	Train
TBA	June 24, 2003	Ellen DeGeneres, Keira Knightley	Liz Phair
TBA	June 25, 2003	Pamela Anderson, Roger Ebert, Richard Roeper	P. Diddy, Murphy Lee, Nelly
TBA	June 26, 2003	Arnold Schwarzenegger, Snoop Dogg	Blu Cantrell
TBA	June 27, 2003	Johnny Depp	Ricky Martin

=== September ===
No.	Original release date	Guest(s)	Musical/entertainment guest(s)
TBA	September 22, 2003	Robert Downey Jr., Tess Drake	Blue Man Group

=== November ===
No.	Original release date	Guest(s)	Musical/entertainment guest(s)
11.195	November 17, 2003	Jim Belushi	Britney Spears
TBA	November 20, 2003	Mike Myers	Al Green

== 2004 ==
=== January ===
No.	Original release date	Guest(s)	Musical/entertainment guest(s)
TBA	January 19, 2004	Simon Cowell, Kelly Ripa	Liz Phair

No.	Original release date	Guest(s)	Musical/entertainment guest(s)
TBA	January 20, 2004	Noah Wyle, Elon Gold	Toby Keith

=== April ===
No.	Original release date	Guest(s)	Musical/entertainment guest(s)
TBA	April 21, 2004	Bill Maher, Lacey Chabert	David Bowie
TBA	April 22, 2004	Denzel Washington, Janeane Garofalo	Mario Winans
TBA	April 27, 2004	Rosie O'Donnell	Lionel Richie

=== May ===
No.	Original release date	Guest(s)	Musical/entertainment guest(s)
TBA	May 6, 2004	Cast of Friends	N/A
TBA	May 28, 2004	Spencer and Abigail Breslin	Tamyra Gray

=== July ===
No.	Original release date	Guest(s)	Musical/entertainment guest(s)
TBA	July 16, 2004	Robin Williams, Jerry Issac	Velvet Revolver

=== September ===
No.	Original release date	Guest(s)	Musical/entertainment guest(s)
TBA	September 20, 2004	Jon Stewart, Bernard Hopkins	Skye Sweetnam

=== October ===
No.	Original release date	Guest(s)	Musical/entertainment guest(s)
12.180	October 22, 2004	Ben Affleck, Phil Jackson	N/A

== 2005 ==
=== January ===
No.	Original release date	Guest(s)	Musical/entertainment guest(s)
TBA	January 24, 2005	Ed McMahon, Bob Newhart, Don Rickles, Drew Carey	k.d. lang

=== April ===
No.	Original release date	Guest(s)	Musical/entertainment guest(s)
TBA	April 7, 2005	Brittany Murphy, Dave Attell	Velvet Revolver
TBA	April 8, 2005	Paul Newman, Sandra Oh	Breaking Benjamin

=== May ===
No.	Original release date	Guest(s)	Musical/entertainment guest(s)
TBA	May 23, 2005	Steven Culp, Ron Howard, John Melendez	Shelby Lynne

=== November ===
No.	Original release date	Guest(s)	Musical/entertainment guest(s)
13.187	November 1, 2005	Ty Barnett, Jimmy Smits	The Redwalls
13.202	November 22, 2005	Tom Arnold, Phil Jackson	Audioslave

== 2006 ==
=== March ===
No.	Original release date	Guest(s)	Musical/entertainment guest(s)
14.47	March 10, 2006	Terry Bradshaw; Marrian Morris and Boo Boo the Chicken;	Russell Crowe and the Ordinary Fear of God
The Audience Wants to Know

=== April ===
No.	Original release date	Guest(s)	Musical/entertainment guest(s)
TBA	April 10, 2006	Paula Abdul, Chris Matthews	Sean Paul
TBA	April 11, 2006	Michael Douglas, Chelsea Handler	Toby Keith
TBA	April 12, 2006	Mary Lynn Rajskub	Jamie Foxx

=== August ===
No.	Original release date	Guest(s)	Musical/entertainment guest(s)
TBA	August 1, 2006	Lisa Kudrow, Piers Morgan	Wolfmother
TBA	August 2, 2006	Phil McGraw, Aaron Eckhart, Jessica Kirson	N/A
TBA	August 3, 2006	Courteney Cox	Yung Joc
TBA	August 4, 2006	Michael Clarke Duncan, Ant	30 Seconds to Mars
TBA	August 7, 2006	John McCain, Justin Long	Five for Fighting
TBA	August 8, 2006	Bill Maher, Floyd Landis	Stone Sour
TBA	August 9, 2006	Mariska Hargitay, Ashley Tisdale	Todd Snider
TBA	August 10, 2006	Kevin Nealon, Kristen Bell	N/A
TBA	August 11, 2006	David Duchovny, Jeff Corwin	Donavon Frankenreiter

=== September ===
No.	Original release date	Guest(s)	Musical/entertainment guest(s)
TBA	September 8, 2006	Travis Pastrana, Ashley Tisdale	N/A

=== October ===
No.	Original release date	Guest(s)	Musical/entertainment guest(s)
TBA	October 6, 2006	Michael Clarke Duncan, Lisa Lampanelli	Rod Stewart

== 2007 ==
=== February ===
No.	Original release date	Guest(s)	Musical/entertainment guest(s)
TBA	February 13, 2007	TBA	Taylor Swift

=== April ===
No.	Original release date	Guest(s)	Musical/entertainment guest(s)
TBA	April 5, 2007	Craig T. Nelson, Molly Shannon	N/A

=== June ===
No.	Original release date	Guest(s)	Musical/entertainment guest(s)
TBA	June 29, 2007	Ethan Hawke, Carlos Mencia	Breaking Benjamin

== 2008 ==
=== February ===
No.	Original release date	Guest(s)	Musical/entertainment guest(s)
16.33	February 15, 2008	Kristin Chenoweth, Russell Peters	Lifehouse

=== August ===
No.	Original release date	Guest(s)	Musical/entertainment guest(s)
16.136	August 5, 2008	Robert Downey Jr., Anna Faris	Toby Keith

=== November ===
No.	Original release date	Guest(s)	Musical/entertainment guest(s)
16.196	November 19, 2008	Kristin Chenoweth, Bill Maher	Nickelback

== 2009 ==
=== January ===
No.	Original release date	Guest(s)	Musical/entertainment guest(s)
TBA	January 8, 2009	TBA	Lady Gaga

=== March ===
No.	Original release date	Guest(s)	Musical/entertainment guest(s)
TBA	March 19, 2009	President Barack Obama	Garth Brooks

=== May ===
No.	Original release date	Guest(s)	Musical/entertainment guest(s)
3755	May 1, 2009	Arsenio Hall, Jules Sylvester	Ziggy Marley
3756	May 4, 2009	Anderson Cooper, Kathleen Madigan	Eli Young Band
3757	May 5, 2009	Howie Mandel, Alec Greven	Robert Randolph & The Clark Sisters
3758	May 6, 2009	Tim Allen, John Cho	Van Morrison
3759	May 7, 2009	Adam Sandler, Judd Apatow	Soulja Boy Tell 'Em
3760	May 8, 2009	Jamie Lee Curtis, Jonah Hill	Jewel
3761	May 11, 2009	Russell Brand, Elizabeth Banks	Ciara
3762	May 12, 2009	Dennis Miller, Calvin Borel	Kelly Clarkson
3763	May 13, 2009	Kevin Spacey, Roberta McCain	Yusuf Islam
3764	May 14, 2009	Katie Couric, Ewan McGregor	The Decemberists
3765	May 15, 2009	Kevin Bacon, Julie Scardina	Kings of Leon
3766	May 18, 2009	Cameron Diaz, Kirk Fox	Blink-182
3767	May 19, 2009	Terry Bradshaw, Ethan Bortnick	Blink-182
3768	May 20, 2009	Bill Maher, Adam Richman	Mandy Moore
3769	May 21, 2009	Andy Samberg, Kris Allen	Lionel Richie
3770	May 22, 2009	Brian Williams, Jesse James	Tori Amos
3771	May 25, 2009	Mel Gibson	Lyle Lovett
3772	May 26, 2009	Arnold Schwarzenegger	Dwight Yoakam
3773	May 27, 2009	Wanda Sykes, Dame Edna Everage	Sarah McLachlan
3774	May 28, 2009	Billy Crystal	Prince
3775	May 29, 2009	Conan O'Brien	James Taylor
