= List of The Tonight Show with Jay Leno episodes (2013–14) =

- No. of episodes: 209 (2013); 23 (2014)

Release
- Original network: NBC

Season chronology
- ← Previous; 2012 episodes Next →

This is a list of episodes for The Tonight Show with Jay Leno that aired in 2013 and 2014. The final episode of the series aired on February 6, 2014.

== 2013 ==
=== January ===
No.	Original release date	Guest(s)	Musical/entertainment guest(s)
4,379	January 2, 2013	Kevin Hart, Betty White	Dwight Yoakam
Headlines
4,380	January 3, 2013	Arnold Schwarzenegger, Chumlee & Rick Harrison	Ziggy Marley
USA vs. The World
4,381	January 4, 2013	Courteney Cox, Joy Behar	Youngblood Hawke
Stuff We Found on eBay
4,382	January 7, 2013	Bill Maher, Snooki, Jwoww	Miguel
Headlines
4,383	January 8, 2013	Emma Stone, Josh Gad	The Whigs
Products for a Better You
4,384	January 9, 2013	Carson Daly, Dave Salmoni	Big Bad Voodoo Daddy
America's Best Americans
4,385	January 10, 2013	Ryan Seacrest, Randy Jackson, Anthony Jeselnik	King & Country
Wheels of Randomness
4,386	January 11, 2013	Ben Affleck, Kristen Bell	Rodriguez
Human Siren and Wiggle Scalp
4,387	January 14, 2013	Nicki Minaj, Billy Connolly	The Saturdays
4,388	January 15, 2013	Jessica Simpson, Lester Holt	Vintage Trouble
Dare!
4,389	January 16, 2013	Mark Wahlberg, Ali Wentworth	JJamz
Jaywalking: Health and Fitness
4,390	January 17, 2013	Naomi Watts, Richard Engel	Train
Woulda, Coulda, Shoulda
4,391	January 18, 2013	Chris Tucker, Bob Costas	Big Boi
Woulda, Coulda, Shoulda
4,392	January 22, 2013	Dana Carvey, Emmy Rossum	Ben Harper, Charlie Musselwhite
Headlines
4,393	January 23, 2013	Heidi Klum, Seann William Scott	Gary Allan
Jay's Garage Surprise, Ask Jay Anything
4,394	January 24, 2013	Dustin Hoffman, Jillian Michaels	Kenny Loggins, Blue Sky Riders
Survey Says!
4,395	January 25, 2013	Robert De Niro, Sherri Shepherd	The Grascals
Quirky Products
4,396	January 28, 2013	Catherine Zeta-Jones, Donny Deutsch	Lady Antebellum
Headlines
4,397	January 29, 2013	Whitney Cummings, Jacki Weaver	Aaron Neville
What's Trending Tomorrow
4,398	January 30, 2013	Charlie Sheen, David O. Russell	Holly Williams
Products That Should Never Merge
4,399	January 31, 2013	Piers Morgan, Quvenzhané Wallis, Benh Zeitlin	Lisa Loeb
Battle of Celebrity All-Stars: Reality

=== February ===
No.	Original release date	Guest(s)	Musical/entertainment guest(s)
4,400	February 1, 2013	Wanda Sykes, Tyler Hamilton	Branford Marsalis Quartet
Kid Metaphors, Dog Predicts Super Bowl Champion
4,401	February 4, 2013	Hugh Jackman, Jessica Chastain	Michael Bolton
Headlines
4,402	February 5, 2013	Josh Duhamel, Kathryn Bigelow	Lianne La Havas
Photo Booth
4,403	February 6, 2013	Tim McGraw, Bar Refaeli	Tim McGraw
Dealing with the Public
4,404	February 7, 2013	Amy Adams, Adam Carolla	Hunter Hayes
Cowboy Bob's Valentine's Day Song, Off the Wall
4,405	February 8, 2013	Seth MacFarlane, Jenna Elfman	Norah Jones
Fake Spokesperson Auditions
4,406	February 11, 2013	James Spader, Lior Suchard	Far East Movement
Redfoo at the Grammy Awards
4,407	February 12, 2013	Charles Barkley, Bob Fisher	Jewel
Headlines
4,408	February 13, 2013	Anne Hathaway, Lester Holt	Eli Young Band
Magic Clerk
4,409	February 14, 2013	Jarod Miller, Timothy Olyphant	Colbie Caillat, Gavin DeGraw
Love Advice with Jim and Jay
4,410	February 15, 2013	Kathy Griffin, David Feherty	FM Radio
Jaywalking: Remembering the Romance
4,411	February 18, 2013	Kevin Bacon, Dennis Rodman	Kevin Eubanks
Headlines
4,412	February 19, 2013	Robin Wright, Josh Gad	Bonnie Raitt
Wheel of Randomness
4,413	February 20, 2013	Chelsea Handler, Edythe Kirchmaier	Sky Blu
Winnovations with Trevor Moore
4,414	February 21, 2013	Arsenio Hall, Karolina Kurkova	Tristan Prettyman
eBay: Sold or Not Sold?
4,415	February 22, 2013	Meredith Viera, Richard Roeper	thenewno2
Jaywalking: Les Misérables Edition
4,416	February 25, 2013	Russell Crowe, Eli Roth	Robert Randolph, The Slide Brothers
Jessie Heiman at Vanity Fair Oscar Party
4,417	February 26, 2013	Colin Farrell, Naomi Campbell	Boz Scaggs
Headlines
4,418	February 27, 2013	David Duchovny, J. B. Smoove	Father John Misty
Copy Cats
4,419	February 28, 2013	Steve Carell, Joey King	Shooter Jennings
Jaywalking: Black History Month

=== March ===
No.	Original release date	Guest(s)	Musical/entertainment guest(s)
4,420	March 1, 2013	Bill O'Reilly, Abigail Breslin	The Mavericks
Pumpcast News
4,421	March 11, 2013	Halle Berry, Rachel Maddow	Ashley Monroe
Headlines
4,422	March 12, 2013	Olivia Wilde, Nick Offerman	Buddy Guy, The Experience Hendrix All-Star Band
Woulda Coulda Shoulda
4,423	March 13, 2013	Jerry Seinfeld, Mark Cuban	Jose James
Survey Says
4,424	March 14, 2013	James Franco, Jay Mohr	Owl City, Yuna
USA vs. The World
4,425	March 15, 2013	Craig Ferguson, Vera Farmiga	Harper Simon
Jaywalking: Pope History
4,426	March 18, 2013	Morgan Freeman, Rulon Gardner, Henry Cejudo	The James Hunter Six
Headlines
4,427	March 19, 2013	Jenna Fischer, Dennis Rodman	Black Prairie
Midseason Replacements
4,428	March 20, 2013	Vanessa Hudgens, Chris O'Dowd	Gary Clark Jr.
Quirky.com Inventions
4,429	March 21, 2013	Dwayne Johnson, Chris Paul	Atlas Genius
Meal or No Meal
4,430	March 22, 2013	Don Cheadle, Louie Anderson	Wiz Khalifa, Akon
Police Blotter
4,431	March 25, 2013	Gerard Butler, Keegan-Michael Key, Jordan Peele	Crystal Bowersox
Headlines
4,432	March 26, 2013	Keith Urban, Paula Deen	Django Django
Jaywalking: Romance
4,433	March 27, 2013	Kristin Chenoweth, Justin Willman	Josh Groban
What's Trending Tomorrow
4,434	March 28, 2013	Kim Kardashian, Willie Geist	Imagine Dragons
April Fool's Pranks

=== April ===
No.	Original release date	Guest(s)	Musical/entertainment guest(s)
4,435	April 1, 2013	Matthew Perry, Kristen Schaal	The Goo Goo Dolls
Headlines
4,436	April 2, 2013	Blake Shelton, Jim Rome	Blake Shelton
Jay Leno in Days of Our Lives
4,437	April 3, 2013	Rosario Dawson, Max Greenfield	Gloriana
Dog Cam Backstage at the Tonight Show, Real Pet Products
4,438	April 4, 2013	Eva Longoria, Terry Crews	Cavalia's Odysseo
Jay Leno Action Figure, Off the Wall
4,439	April 5, 2013	Julie Scardina, Demetri Martin	Gin Wigmore
Fake Spokesperson Auditions
4,440	April 8, 2013	Julia Louis-Dreyfus, Anthony Jeselnik	Vintage Trouble
Headlines
4,441	April 9, 2013	Rebel Wilson, Jackson Galaxy	Hanson
Kid Metaphors, Weed for Animals
4,442	April 10, 2013	Charlie Sheen, Andy Enfield	Brad Paisley
Celebrity Men and Look-a-like Kittens
4,443	April 11, 2013	LL Cool J, Andy Cohen	Tegan and Sara
You've Been Warned
4,444	April 12, 2013	Adam Levine, Cyndi Lauper	The Airborne Toxic Event
Poetry Month with Adam The Page
4,445	April 22, 2013	Diane Keaton, Trevor Moore	Jake Bugg
Headlines
4,446	April 23, 2013	Carol Burnett, Stephen Amell	Plain White T's
Jaywalking: Earth Week
4,447	April 24, 2013	Emily Blunt, Tom Cruise	Black Rebel Motorcycle Club
Wheels of Randomness
4,448	April 25, 2013	Gwyneth Paltrow, J. B. Smoove	Billy Ray Cyrus
Audience Interrupts: Earth Week
4,449	April 26, 2013	Robert Downey Jr., Chadwick Boseman	Avril Lavigne
Janelle Arthur performs
4,450	April 29, 2013	Sir Ben Kingsley, Larry the Cable Guy	The Band Perry
Headlines
4,451	April 30, 2013	Cher, Georgia Holt, Dov Davidoff	Florida Georgia Line
Copy Cats

=== May ===
No.	Original release date	Guest(s)	Musical/entertainment guest(s)
4,452	May 1, 2013	Kathy Griffin, Eli Roth	Cheap Trick
Martha Stewart Needs a Man, What's 'Appening?
4,453	May 2, 2013	Matt Lauer, Jen Kirkman	Awolnation
Ice Cream Truck Turf Wars, Game of Thrones Pick Up Lines, Dare!
4,454	May 3, 2013	Chris Evans, Kevin Smith	Various Cruelties
99 Cents Store, Amber Holcomb Performs
4,455	May 6, 2013	Magic Johnson, Savannah Guthrie	Fall Out Boy
Headlines
4,456	May 7, 2013	Lauren Graham, Ken Jeong	Patty Griffin
4,457	May 8, 2013	Craig Ferguson, Connie Sawyer	Emeli Sande
Pumpcast News
4,458	May 9, 2013	Shakira, Marc Maron	Tom Jones
Spouse Saucer, Mother's Day Gifts
4,459	May 10, 2013	Aaron Eckhart, Sherri Shepherd	98 Degrees
Angie Miller Performs, Battle of Celeb All-Stars: Reality Edition
4,460	May 13, 2013	Miranda Lambert, Ross Matthews	Pistol Annies
Headlines
4,461	May 14, 2013	Wanda Sykes, Martha Stewart	Drop City Yacht Club
WINnovations
4,462	May 15, 2013	Usher, Nick Offerman	Pyramids
Dealing with the Public
4,463	May 16, 2013	Adam Sandler, Phil Jackson	Family of the Year
Jaywalking: Blockbusters
4,464	May 17, 2013	Mitt Romney, Ann Romney, Candice Glover	Candice Glover
Quirky.com Inventions
4,465	May 20, 2013	Bradley Cooper, Heidi Klum	The-Dream, Kelly Rowland
Headlines
4,466	May 21, 2013	Eric Stonestreet, Jeremy Wade	Thompson Square
Woulda Coulda Shoulda
4,467	May 22, 2013	Vin Diesel, Jeff Foxworthy	The Lone Bellow
USA vs. The World
4,468	May 23, 2013	Tyler Perry, Isla Fisher	Shout Out Louds
Jay's Smart Cat, Fake Spokesperson Auditions
4,469	May 24, 2013	Howie Mandel, Sal Basille & Francis Garcia	Sigur Ros
Jaywalking: Relationship Contracts

=== June ===
No.	Original release date	Guest(s)	Musical/entertainment guest(s)
4,470	June 3, 2013	Vince Vaughn, Kathleen Madigan	Scott McCreery
Headlines, Stand Up from Kathleen Madigan
4,471	June 4, 2013	Owen Wilson, Brett Raymer & Wayde King	LeAnn Rimes
Meal or No Meal
4,472	June 5, 2013	Danny McBride, Khloe Kardashian Odom	The Wanted
Ask Jay Anything
4,473	June 6, 2013	Henry Cavill, Jessica Buchanan & Erik Landemalm	She & Him
Kim Kardashian's Surprising Sonogram, Police Blotter
4,474	June 7, 2013	Russell Crowe, Mike Raupp	Judith Hill
Jaywalking: News
4,475	June 10, 2013	Kevin Bacon, Mel B	Bad Company
Headlines, The Difference Between Moms & Dads
4,476	June 11, 2013	Jamie Foxx, Jimmy Connors	Matthew Morrison
Pumpcast News
4,477	June 12, 2013	Kevin Hart, Jeremy Scahill	Trace Adkins, Colbie Caillat
Prank You Very Much, Video Metaphor: NSA
4,478	June 13, 2013	Carson Daly, Betty White	Timeflies
Father's Day Gift Ideas
4,479	June 14, 2013	Armie Hammer, Dave Salmoni	The Boxer Rebellion
4,480	June 17, 2013	Billy Crystal	Pitbull
Headlines
4,481	June 18, 2013	Kathy Griffin, Billy Gardell	Grouplove
Fake Spokesperson Auditions
4,482	June 19, 2013	David Gregory, J. Chris Newberg	Danielle Bradbery
Mountain Lions & Prancing Cougars, Kid Metaphors
4,483	June 20, 2013	Kristin Davis, Harvey Fierstein	The Mowgli's
Jaywalking: Beauty Pageant
4,484	June 21, 2013	Terry Bradshaw, Steve Byrne	Joseph Arthur
Audience Interrupts
4,485	June 24, 2013	Steve Carell, Ken Ilgunas	Barenaked Ladies
Headlines, Queen's Winning Reaction
4,486	June 25, 2013	Sandra Bullock, Bob Saget	Il Volo
Summer Products, Consequences of Dogs in Prison
4,487	June 26, 2013	Whitney Cummings, Alex Minsky	John Fogerty
What's Trending Tomorrow
4,488	June 27, 2013	David Spade, Joey King	Grace Potter and The Nocturnals
Audience Sizzle Reels
4,489	June 28, 2013	Wanda Sykes, Kris Jenner	India Arie
Photo Booth

=== July ===
No.	Original release date	Guest(s)	Musical/entertainment guest(s)
4,490	July 8, 2013	Charlie Day, Jeffrey Dean Morgan	Lionel Richie
Headlines
4,491	July 9, 2013	Dane Cook, Nev Schulman	Matt Nathanson
Copy Cats
4,492	July 10, 2013	John Malkovich, Olivia Munn	Blackberry Smoke
eBay: Sold or Not Sold
4,493	July 11, 2013	Helen Mirren, Ben Schwartz	The Olms
Cheetah vs. Impala, Midsummer Replacement Shows
4,494	July 12, 2013	Bill Hader, Eliot Spitzer	Passenger
Dare!
4,495	July 15, 2013	Savannah Guthrie, Anthony Jeselnik	Johnnyswim
Headlines
4,496	July 16, 2013	Zachary Levi, Danica Patrick	Talib Kweli, Nelly, Abby Dobson
USA vs. The World
4,497	July 17, 2013	Jane Lynch, Charlie Hunnam	Serena Ryder
Royal Baby Gift Ideas
4,498	July 18, 2013	Anthony Hopkins, Amy Schumer	Robert Randolph and the Family Band
Woulda Coulda Shoulda
4,499	July 19, 2013	Howie Mandel, Marisa Miller	Sara Bareilles
Jaywalking: Staycation
4,500	July 22, 2013	Gillian Anderson, Jim Rash, Nat Faxon	Kenny Chesney
Headlines
4,501	July 23, 2013	Aaron Paul, Selena Gomez	Selena Gomez
Ask Jay Anything
4,502	July 24, 2013	Ashton Kutcher, Jayma Mays	Hiatus Kaiyote
Trevor Moore's Winnovtions
4,503	July 25, 2013	Cate Blanchett, Michael B. Jordan	Court Yard Hounds
Meal or No Meal
4,504	July 26, 2013	Katy Perry, Cris Collinsworth	Kacey Musgraves
Anthony Weiner Time Life Collection, Fake Spokesperson Auditions
4,505	July 29, 2013	Kristen Bell, Jake Johnson	Philip Phillips
Headlines
4,506	July 30, 2013	Kristin Chenoweth, Josh Gad	Kristin Chenoweth
Dealing with the Public
4,507	July 31, 2013	Kate Hudson, Bob Costas	Kopecky Family Band
Photo Booth

=== August ===
No.	Original release date	Guest(s)	Musical/entertainment guest(s)
4,508	August 1, 2013	Casey Affleck, Allison Janney	Sammy Hagar
Social Media Update, Kardashian's Paparazzi Response
4,509	August 2, 2013	Meredith Vieira, Jim Norton	Charlie Worsham
Police Blotter
4,510	August 5, 2013	Bryan Cranston, Karolina Kurkova	Amos Lee
Headlines
4,511	August 6, 2013	Barack Obama	Patti LaBelle
4,512	August 7, 2013	Matt Damon, Anna Faris	Parachute
You've Been Warned
4,513	August 8, 2013	Robin Williams, Mark Cuban	Gavin DeGraw
Delight Betty White
4,514	August 9, 2013	Jason Sudeikis, Jim Stacy	KT Tunstall
You Be the Nominee: VMA Edition
4,515	August 26, 2013	Jeff Daniels, Sherri Shepherd	Quinn Sullivan
Headlines
4,516	August 27, 2013	Josh Duhamel, J. B. Smoove	Macklemore, Ryan Lewis
Pumpcast News
4,517	August 28, 2013	Matt LeBlanc, Natasha Leggero	Sky Blu
Jaywalking: Know Your Heritage
4,518	August 29, 2013	Julie Scardina, Rod Stewart	Rod Stewart
Audience Sizzle Reels
4,519	August 30, 2013	John McCain, Diablo Cody	Booker T. Jones, Mayer Hawthorne
Pitch to Norton

=== September ===
No.	Original release date	Guest(s)	Musical/entertainment guest(s)
4,520	September 3, 2013	Bill Maher, Victoria Duval	ZZ Ward
Headlines
4,521	September 4, 2013	Christina Applegate, Rob Corddry	White Lies
Prank You Very Much
4,522	September 5, 2013	Vince Vaughn, Olivia Munn	Vintage Trouble
Jay's Garage Striptease, Back to School Products
4,523	September 6, 2013	Simon Cowell, Adam Carolla	American Authors
eBay: Sold or Not Sold
4,524	September 9, 2013	Martin Short, Meghan McCain	Backstreet Boys
Headlines
4,525	September 10, 2013	Rose Byrne, Donny Deutsch	Jennifer Nettles
Woulda Coulda Shoulda
4,526	September 11, 2013	Charlie Sheen, Jim Rome	Trombone Shorty
Jaywalking: Get a Clue
4,527	September 12, 2013	Hugh Jackman, Aisha Tyler	OneRepublic
Hidden Messages
4,528	September 13, 2013	Zooey Deschanel, Terry Crews	Buena Vista Social Club
Photo Booth
4,529	September 16, 2013	Chris Hemsworth, Kristen Schaal	Sheryl Crow
Headlines
4,530	September 17, 2013	Neil Patrick Harris, Demi Lovato	Five for Fighting
Copy Cats
4,531	September 18, 2013	Christina Aguilera, Joy Behar	Valerie June
Quirky.com Inventions
4,532	September 19, 2013	Tim Allen, Dwyane Wade	Fitz and the Tantrums
What's 'Appening
4,533	September 20, 2013	Jimmy Fallon, Lior Suchard	Billy Currington
USA vs. The World, Dodgers' Celebration Swim
4,534	September 23, 2013	Justin Timberlake, Paula Patton	Jason Collings
Headlines
4,535	September 24, 2013	Olivia Wilde, Adam Scott	Cher Lloyd
Winnovations
4,536	September 25, 2013	Dana Carvey, CeeLo Green	Goodie Mob
Survey Says!
4,537	September 26, 2013	Julia Louis-Dreyfus, Ron Paul	Little Big Town
Spithill Does Spit Take on Leno, What's Trending Tomorrow
4,538	September 27, 2013	Sandra Bullock, Keegan-Michael Key, Jordan Peele	Gregory Porter
Headlines
4,539	September 30, 2013	Earvin "Magic" Johnson, Marjorie Johnson	Gary Clark Jr.
Headlines

=== October ===
No.	Original release date	Guest(s)	Musical/entertainment guest(s)
4,540	October 1, 2013	Joseph Gordon-Levitt, Jay Mohr	Mika, Ariana Grande
Government Shutdown Closures
4,541	October 2, 2013	Kathy Griffin, Newt Gingrich	Demi Lovato
Meal or No Meal, Fire Useless Politicians
4,542	October 3, 2013	Julianne Moore, Billy Gardell	Stone Temple Pilots, Chester Bennington
Ask Jay Anything
4,543	October 4, 2013	Terry Bradshaw, Fantasy Football Tattoo League	Nelly
Kid Metaphors
4,544	October 7, 2013	Drew Barrymore, D. L. Hughley	The Avett Brothers
Headlines
4,545	October 8, 2013	Billy Crystal, Snooki, JWoww	Toni Braxton, Kenny "Babyface" Edmonds
Fake Spokesperson Auditions
4,546	October 9, 2013	Whitney Cummings, Ann Romney	Lissie
Products That Should Never Merge
4,547	October 10, 2013	Lauren Graham, Chris Matthews	Tom Odell
Police Blotter
4,548	October 11, 2013	Jack Black, Kyle Gass, Rosie Perez	Tenacious D
Jaywalking: TV Openings
4,549	October 21, 2013	Michael Douglas, Larry the Cable Guy	Thomas Rhett
Headlines
4,550	October 22, 2013	Kristin Chenoweth, Ross Matthews	Joan Jett and the Blackhearts
Jaywalking: Selfie Tips
4,551	October 23, 2013	Harrison Ford, Piers Morgan	Daughtry
99 Cent Shopping Spree
4,552	October 24, 2013	Emma Roberts, Dave Salmoni	Diane Birch
Jay's World Series Promo, Jon Lester's Glove Substance, Social Media Update
4,553	October 25, 2013	Wanda Sykes, Richard Engel	Scotty McCreery
Kitten Plays Computer, Pumpcast News
4,554	October 28, 2013	Adam Levine, Ali Wentworth	Steve Nieve, Elvis Costello
Headlines
4,555	October 29, 2013	Savannah Guthrie, Mark Cuban	Kodaline
Big Papi's Home Run Twerk, Audience Sizzle Reels
4,556	October 30, 2013	Kim Kardashian, Abigail Breslin	Two Door Cinema Club
Scary Halloween Products
4,557	October 31, 2013	Matthew McConaughey, Eli Roth	The Fray
Jay Gets Spooky Phone Call, Audience Interrupts

=== November ===
No.	Original release date	Guest(s)	Musical/entertainment guest(s)
4,558	November 1, 2013	Melissa McCarthy, Andy Cohen	Empire of the Sun
Dare!
4,559	November 4, 2013	Anthony Hopkins, Sting	Sting
Headlines
4,560	November 5, 2013	Liam Hemsworth, Jayma Mays	The Rides featuring Stephen Stills and Kenny Wayne Shepherd
Kitty Courier, Woulda Coulda Shoulda
4,561	November 6, 2013	Ellen DeGeneres, Bill Engvall	Tired Pony
Q&A with Mayor Rob Ford, Dealing with the Public
4,562	November 7, 2013	Andy Samberg, Bailee Madison	Goo Goo Dolls
4,563	November 8, 2013	Mariska Hargitay, Ted Cruz	Gavin DeGraw
4,564	November 11, 2013	Kelly Clarkson, Casey Affleck	Lyle Lovett
Headlines
4,565	November 12, 2013	Matt Lauer, Carrot Top	Cults
Does This Delight Betty White?
4,566	November 13, 2013	Bill Cosby, Chris Pratt	Gary Allan
What's Trending Tomorrow
4,567	November 14, 2013	Craig Ferguson, Jaimie Alexander	J Rand, Flo Rida
You've Been Warned
4,568	November 15, 2013	Bill O'Reilly, Guy Fieri	Lee Brice
Winnovations
4,569	November 18, 2013	Whoopi Goldberg, Ty Barnett	TOTEM from Cirque du Soleil
Headlines
4,570	November 19, 2013	George W. Bush, Laura Bush	Ben Harper, Charlie Musselwhite
Jaywalking: Thanksgiving Quiz
4,571	November 20, 2013	Blake Shelton, Kathie Lee Gifford, Hoda Kotb	Imelda May
Prank You Very Much
4,572	November 21, 2013	Kristen Bell, David Gregory	Julian Lennon
Joe Boxer & Jay's Garage Christmas Show, Photo Booth
4,573	November 22, 2013	Jim Parsons, John Downer	Cassadee Pope
Copy Cats
4,574	November 25, 2013	Bette Midler, Michael Bublé	Michael Bublé
Headlines
4,575	November 26, 2013	Quentin Tarantino, Jim Stacy	Luke Bryan
Fake Spokesperson Auditions
4,576	November 27, 2013	Garth Brooks, Jim Edds	Garth Brooks
Kid Metaphors
4,577	November 28, 2013	Christina Aguilera, Jay Mohr	Christina Aguilera
USA Vs. The World

=== December ===
No.	Original release date	Guest(s)	Musical/entertainment guest(s)
4,578	December 9, 2013	Simon Cowell, Megyn Kelly	MS MR
Headlines
4,579	December 10, 2013	Kirstie Alley, Ernie Brown Jr.	Switchfoot
Real Christmas Products
4,580	December 11, 2013	Tyler Perry, Ken Jeong	The Head and the Heart
Meal or No Meal
4,581	December 12, 2013	Kevin Hart, Brooklyn Decker	Chris Young
Police Blotter
4,582	December 13, 2013	Carson Daly, Billy Ray Cyrus	Billy Ray Cyrus
Jim Norton: Meaning of Christmas
4,583	December 16, 2013	Meredith Vieira, J. B. Smoove	Jake Bugg
Headlines
4,584	December 17, 2013	Olivia Wilde, Julie Scardina	Johnny Mathis
99 Cents Store
4,585	December 18, 2013	Christina Applegate, Kevin Nealon	Tessanne Chin
Quirky.com Inventions
4,586	December 19, 2013	Sylvester Stallone, Judd Apatow	Libera
JibJab Year in Review 2013, Cat Theater: Leap of Faith, Ask Jay Anything
4,587	December 20, 2013	Michael Strahan, Marjorie Johnson	Leona Lewis
Jaywalking: Good Caroler Bad Caroler

== 2014 ==
=== January ===
No.	Original release date	Guest(s)	Musical/entertainment guest(s)
4,588	January 6, 2014	Louis C.K., John McCain, Meghan McCain	Plain White T's
Headlines
4,589	January 7, 2014	Mark Wahlberg, Kathryn Hahn	Salaam Remi, Akon
Products for a Better You
4,590	January 8, 2014	Steve Carell, Maria Shriver	Jake Clemons
Magic Clerk
4,591	January 9, 2014	Leslie Mann, David Koechner	Vince Gill, Paul Franklin
Jaywalking: Year in Review
4,592	January 10, 2014	Kevin Bacon, Sherri Shepherd	Mary Lambert
Best of Pumpcasting
4,593	January 13, 2014	Jennifer Lopez, Aaron Eckhart	Adam Hunter
Headlines
4,594	January 14, 2014	Matt Damon, Larry the Cable Guy	Chris Isaak
Best of Photo Booth
4,595	January 15, 2014	Vanessa Hudgens, Mark Cuban	Foreigner
Best of WINnovations
4,596	January 16, 2014	Mark Harmon, Gracie Gold	Kristin Chenoweth
Coulda, Woulda, Shoulda
4,597	January 17, 2014	Chelsea Handler, Bob Costas	Sharon Jones & The Dap-Kings
Best of Oakwood Movies
4,598	January 21, 2014	Adam Sandler, Ali Wentworth	Sheryl Crow
Headlines
4,599	January 22, 2014	Charlie Sheen, Joy Behar	Neon Trees
Best of Survey Says
4,600	January 23, 2014	Matt LeBlanc, John Boehner	Dorian Holley
Ask Jay Anything
4,601	January 24, 2014	Terry Bradshaw, Heidi Klum	Darius Rucker
Best of Jaywalking: Music Videos Edition
4,602	January 27, 2014	Dana Carvey, Magic Johnson	A Great Big World
Headlines
4,603	January 28, 2014	Wanda Sykes, Thomas Haden Church	Dwight Yoakam
Best of Civilians
4,604	January 29, 2014	Bill Maher, Whitney Cummings	Jennifer Nettles, Seth MacFarlane
Best of Fake Spokesperson Auditions
4,605	January 30, 2014	Miley Cyrus, Howie Mandel	Sarah McLachlan
Best of Jaywalking
4,606	January 31, 2014	Tim Allen, Dave Salmoni	Sara Bareilles
Best of Kids

=== February ===
No.	Original release date	Guest(s)	Musical/entertainment guest(s)
4,607	February 3, 2014	Jimmy Fallon, Betty White	Bonnie Raitt
Best of Headlines
4,608	February 4, 2014	Matthew McConaughey, Charles Barkley	Lyle Lovett
Great Celebrity Moments
4,609	February 5, 2014	Sandra Bullock, Blake Shelton	Vintage Trouble
Stuff I Found Cleaning Up My Office (with Mickey Rooney, Kevin Smith, Carrot Top, and Arsenio Hall)
4,610	February 6, 2014	Billy Crystal	Garth Brooks
What's Next for Jay?
