= David Willey (physicist) =

English physicist and educator (born 1947)

- Born: David G. Willey; 4 November 1947 (age 78); Marston Green, England
- Other name: Mad Scientist
- Occupations: Physics instructor and entertainer
- Spouse: Raven
- Website: Official website

David G. Willey (born 4 November 1947), known as the Mad Scientist, is an English former physics instructor at the University of Pittsburgh at Johnstown in Johnstown, Pennsylvania. He has been presenting physics shows since the early 1980s. Willey is a scientific consultant for the skeptics group Committee for Skeptical Inquiry (C.S.I.). He also designs physics apparatus and equipment for the Science Kit Boreal Labs.

== Education and career ==
Willey studied at Aston University and Birmingham University from 1966 to 1971. Then he taught at Saltley Grammar School, in Birmingham from 1971 to 1972. Next, Willey moved from his home country of England to the United States and enrolled at the Ohio State University. He was in Columbus, Ohio, until he obtained his master's degree in physics in 1974. His first teaching position was with the University of Pittsburgh at Johnstown. In the early 1980s, he performed his first physics show at the university's open house.

A few months later, Willey made a 15-minute video of physics demonstrations with a group of troubled boys from a remand home. This video was played on local television for the public to see. A local school teacher saw Willey's demonstrations and asked him to perform some of them for her class. Willey then began a physics show called "How Does A Thing Like That Work?".

Looking for the next big physics demonstrations, Willey found firewalking. He teamed up with the Norwegian physicist, Kjetil Kjernsmo of University of Oslo, to study the physics behind firewalking. They developed a computer model of a foot while a person firewalked. They needed data from long walks and hot walks to verify the computer model. A firewalking group from Seattle volunteered to perform the first walk. On 18 October 1997, in Redmond, Washington, Michael McDermott walked across a bed of coals that were at a temperature of 1,813 °F (989 °C). Willey also walked on that fire bed, but not at the record temperature.

Willey's next, and most famous firewalk, was in July 1998 at the University of Pittsburgh at Johnstown. This firewalk was 165 feet (50 m) long to break the world record for the longest distance walking on fire. His walk was recorded and shown on television by the BBC and ABC. This got the attention of the producers of The Tonight Show with Jay Leno. Willey's nickname, "Mad Scientist", was born. For the next 10 years (1998–2008) Willey performed physics demonstrations on The Tonight Show. He appeared on the show 19 times. During this time, Willey also appeared on other television shows such as Time Warp, Humanly Impossible, Talk Soup, Steve Harvey's Big Time, King 5 TV, Skeptical Inquirer, Extreme Body Parts, John Stossel's Power of Belief, the Crook and Chase Show, Science Park, Jensen!, Johannes B. Kerner, The Brian Conley Show, Fantasia, Penn & Teller: Bullshit!, Wednesday Night at the Lab, part of the 25th Wonders of Physics in Madison, Wisconsin, and a seven part series on the Shaolin Monks for the Canadian Discovery Channel.
