= Marjorie Johnson =

American baker (1919–2025)

Marjorie Eleanora Johnson (née Holtby; August 9, 1919 – October 30, 2025), known as the Blue Ribbon Baker, was an American baker from Robbinsdale, Minnesota, born in Hennepin County, Minnesota. First made famous through her guest appearances on KSTP radio's Garage Logic, she appeared on numerous talk shows, including The Tonight Show with Jay Leno, The Rosie O'Donnell Show, The View, and The Kelly Clarkson Show in September 2019 at age 100. Johnson won over 2,500 fair ribbons, including over 1,000 blue ribbons and numerous sweepstakes ribbons.

Johnson was born on August 9, 1919. She had dwarfism, with a height of 4 ft 8 in (142.24 cm).

In 2007, she became the newest correspondent for The Tonight Show with Jay Leno. She brought her home-made cooking to such events as the Major League Baseball All-Star Game, the Emmy Awards, and the Grammy Awards. She published the book The Road to Blue Ribbon Baking: With Marjorie in 2007.

Johnson turned 100 on August 9, 2019, and died on October 30, 2025, at the age of 106.
