= Jules Sylvester =

British animal trainer

- Born: Julian Richard Sylvester; 13 November 1950 (age 75); Devon, England
- Occupations: Wild animal trainer, actor, television presenter, snake wrangler
- Years active: 1975–present
- Spouse: Sue Sylvester (m. 1987)

Jules Sylvester (born Julian Richard Sylvester; 13 November 1950) is a British wild animal trainer, actor, television presenter and snake wrangler who works in films as well as television.

== Early life ==
He was born in Devon, England, and raised in Kenya where he was first introduced to snake catching at age 16. Sylvester worked as a lion keeper at Edinburgh Zoo for two years. He served in the Rhodesia Regiment during the Rhodesian Bush War from 1973-1974.

== Career ==
He has appeared in numerous television shows including a series of appearances on The Tonight Show with Jay Leno and his own 2002 series Wild Adventures. He handled snakes for the films Pee-wee's Big Adventure, Ernest Saves Christmas, Indiana Jones and the Last Crusade and Snakes on a Plane. He was also a guest on The Bernie Mac Show. He has also made multiple appearances on Spike TV's 1000 Ways to Die, in segments dealing with animal-related deaths. In 2006, he claimed that after 40 years of snake handling he had never been bitten. He also appeared as a snake handler in an episode of CSI: Crime Scene Investigation, "Got Murder."

He also professionally trains mammals including rhinos, wolves and lions.

In 2012, he appeared in Animal Movers in Episode 2: "The Tortoise and the Hare-Raising Cobra". He transported cobras to Florida.

On 19 February 2020, he appeared in Ryan's Mystery Playdate in Season 2 Episode 20, the first segment "Ryan's Jungle Lovin' Playdate". Later that year, Sylvester handled ants on the set of scenes for "The Guy for This", the third episode of the fifth season of Better Call Saul.

== Personal life ==
He has been married to Sue Sylvester since 1987.

== Filmography ==
=== Film ===
Year	Title	Role	Notes
1982	Captain Stirrick	Ned Stirrick	Credited as Julian Sylvester
1989	Turner & Hooch	Animal Control Man	Credited as Julian Sylvester
1992	Bram Stoker's Dracula	Zookeeper	
1993	Hard Target	Peterson	
2010	Jackass 3D	Himself	Uncredited; Cameo
2010	Shelter	Older Man - Snake Milker	Titled 6 Souls in the United States
2022	Jackass Forever	Himself	Guest appearances
2022	Jackass 4.5	Himself	Cameo
2026	Jackass: Best and Last	Himself	Archive footage

=== Television ===
Year	Title	Role	Notes
1994	Kidsongs	Himself	Episodes: "Alligator on the Loose" and "Recycled TV"
1997	ER	"Jungle" Gary Lomax	Episode: "Freak Show"
1998–2010	The Tonight Show with Jay Leno	Himself	14 episodes
2002	The Bernie Mac Show	Himself	Episode: "Welcome to the Jungle"
2003	CSI: Crime Scene Investigation	Jake	Episode: "Got Murder?"
2006	The Daily Show	Himself	Episode: "Reza Asian"
2006–2017	Jimmy Kimmel Live!	Himself	2 episodes
2007	Desperate Housewives	Snake Handler	Episode: "Gossip"; Credited as Julian Sylvester
2008–2012	1000 Ways to Die	Himself	20 episodes
2013–2014	America Now	Himself	10 episodes
2017	Black-ish	Animal Trainer	Episode: "ToysRn'tUs"
2017	Escape the Night	Vampire	Credited as Julian Sylvester; Episodes "The Masquerade Ball: Parts 1 & 2"
2020	Ryan's Mystery Playdate	Himself	Episodes: "Ryan's Jungle Lovin' Playdate" and "Ryan's Slithering Playdate"
