= List of The Tonight Show with Jay Leno episodes (1996–1999) =

Release
- Original network: NBC

Season chronology
- ← Previous; 1992–95 episodes Next → 2000–09 episodes

The Tonight Show with Jay Leno is an American late-night talk show hosted by Jay Leno that first aired from May 25, 1992, to May 29, 2009, and resumed its second production on March 1, 2010, until its ending on February 6, 2014, after Conan O'Brien's short tenure. This was the fourth incarnation of the Tonight Show series that began three days after Johnny Carson's tenure came to an end. This is a list of episodes for The Tonight Show with Jay Leno that aired from January 1, 1996, to December 31, 1999.

== 1996 ==
=== January ===
No.	Original release date	Guest(s)	Musical/entertainment guest(s)
4.77	January 1, 1996	Arnold Schwarzenegger, Lily Tomlin	Seal
4.1078	January 2, 1996	David Hasselhoff, Jane Curtin	Deep Blue Something
4.78	January 4, 1996	David Schwimmer, Shawn Wayans	Dave Dederer
4.79	January 5, 1996	James Woods	Soul Asylum
4.80	January 9, 1996	John Travolta	Jimmy Buffett
4.81	January 15, 1996	Claudia Schiffer, Denis Leary	Merle Haggard
4.82	January 16, 1996	George Clooney, Jennifer Jason Leigh	Goo Goo Dolls
4.83	January 17, 1996	Dave Foley, Susan Sarandon	N/A
4.84	January 18, 1996	Richard Dreyfuss, Angie Harmon, Phil Hartman as Bill Clinton, Crystal Bernard	Tracy Chapman
4.85	January 19, 1996	John Lithgow, Quentin Tarantino	Lisa Loeb
4.1086	January 22, 1996	Jay Thomas, Salma Hayek	Emmylou Harris
4.86	January 23, 1996	Chris Farley, Tyra Banks	N/A
4.87	January 24, 1996	Dennis Miller	Melissa Etheridge
4.88	January 25, 1996	Chris Farley, Tyra Banks, Valeria Mazza	N/A
4.89	January 26, 1996	Tom Arnold	Paula Bel
4.90	January 29, 1996	Emmitt Smith, Natalie Cron, Ted Danson	Patty Loveless
4.91	January 30, 1996	Gena Lee Nolin, Richard Lewis	N/A
4.92	January 31, 1996	Eric Esch, Tony Danza	Seal

=== February ===
No.	Original release date	Guest(s)	Musical/entertainment guest(s)
4.93	February 1, 1996	Paul Reiser	Rod Stewart
4.94	February 2, 1996	Kim Delaney, Timothy Hutton	All-4-One
4.95	February 5, 1996	John Travolta, Tori Spelling	Bruce Hornsby
4.96	February 6, 1996	Brett Butler, Caroline Kennedy	The Rembrandts
4.97	February 7, 1996	Chris Bliss, Christian Slater, Jane Leeves	N/A
4.98	February 8, 1996	Lauren Holly, Magic Johnson	Tori Amos
4.99	February 9, 1996	David Spade, Jennifer Love Hewitt	Seven Mary Three
4.100	February 12, 1996	David Copperfield, Tim Allen, Veronica Webb	N/A
4.101	February 13, 1996	Ellen DeGeneres, Howie Long	N/A
4.102	February 14, 1996	Linda Evangelista, Martin Scorsese	Amy Grant
4.103	February 15, 1996	Noah Wyle	Jackson Browne, Paula Bel
4.104	February 16, 1996	N/A	k.d. lang
4.105	February 19, 1996	David Hyde Pierce	Brandy Norwood
4.106	February 20, 1996	Adam Sandler, Ann-Margret	Supersuckers, Willie Nelson
4.107	February 21, 1996	Richard Simmons	Aimee Mann
4.108	February 22, 1996	Natalie Portman, Troy Aikman	Green Day
4.109	February 23, 1996	Eric Esch, Jack Coen, Shannen Doherty	N/A
4.110	February 26, 1996	David Duchovny, Rowan Atkinson	Bo Diddley, Bonnie Raitt
4.111	February 27, 1996	Armin Shimerman	Lisa Haley
4.112	February 28, 1996	Geechy Guy, Kathy Ireland, Scott Wolf	N/A
4.113	February 29, 1996	George Wallace, Tim Robbins	Mary J. Blige

=== March ===
No.	Original release date	Guest(s)	Musical/entertainment guest(s)
4.114	March 1, 1996	Teri Hatcher	Red Hot Chili Peppers
4.115	March 4, 1996	James Carville, Richard Dreyfuss	Celine Dion
4.116	March 5, 1996	Anthony Hopkins, Kevin Spacey	Coolio
4.117	March 6, 1996	Elle Macpherson, Frank Bruno, Mel Gibson	N/A
4.118	March 7, 1996	Randy Newman	Lyle Lovett
4.119	March 8, 1996	Malcolm Gets, Sean Penn	The Subdudes
4.120	March 11, 1996	Kurt Russell, Paula Poundstone	Bush
4.121	March 12, 1996	George Carlin, Nancy Travis	N/A
4.122	March 13, 1996	Dennis Franz, Emily Young, Lenny Clarke	N/A
4.123	March 14, 1996	Matt LeBlanc, Mark Henry	Neil Diamond
4.124	March 15, 1996	Ben Stiller, Jimmy Smits	Radiohead
4.125	March 18, 1996	Jon Stewart, Luke Tarsitano	Wynonna Judd
4.126	March 19, 1996	Tom Selleck, Samantha Mathis	Lou Reed
4.127	March 20, 1996	Anthony Clark, Chazz Palminteri, Fran Drescher	N/A
4.128	March 21, 1996	Dennis Miller, Gene Siskel, Roger Ebert, Peri Gilpin	N/A
4.129	March 22, 1996	Gerry Swallow, Robert Duvall, Sharon Stone	N/A

=== April ===
No.	Original release date	Guest(s)	Musical/entertainment guest(s)
4.130	April 1, 1996	Richard Gere, Sean Young	Cowboy Junkies
4.131	April 2, 1996	Martin Lawrence, Owen Wilson, Luke Wilson	N/A
4.132	April 3, 1996	Chuck Hull Joey Lawrence	N/A
4.133	April 4, 1996	Patricia Arquette, Kevin Sorbo, Richard Jeni	N/A
4.134	April 5, 1996	Alexi Lalas, Phil Hartman	Steve Earle
4.135	April 8, 1996	Cybill Shepherd, Christopher Darden	The Mavericks
4.136	April 9, 1996	Dave Foley, Joan Embery, Kivi Rogers	N/A
4.137	April 10, 1996	Gemini Barnett, Marilu Henner	Tony Rich
4.138	April 11, 1996	David Hasselhoff, Téa Leoni	Lionel Richie
4.139	April 12, 1996	Karl Malone, Lily Tomlin, Teller	Dolly Parton, MC Hammer
4.140	April 15, 1996	Amy Pietz, Tom Berenger, Willi Hufnagel	N/A
4.141	April 16, 1996	Jack Wagner, Ricki Lake	Jann Arden
4.142	April 17, 1996	Don Johnson	Pam Tillis
4.143	April 18, 1996	Don Rickles, Mitch Richmond, Roberto Benigni	N/A
4.144	April 19, 1996	Daniel Stern, Sandra Bernhard	Spacehog
4.145	April 22, 1996	Uma Thurman	Shania Twain
4.146	April 23, 1996	Dick Clark, Gregg Rogell, Rob Morrow	N/A
4.147	April 24, 1996	Brian Williams, Pamela Anderson, Rhea Perlman	N/A
4.148	April 25, 1996	Kevin James, Jean-Claude Van Damme	Faith Hill
4.149	April 26, 1996	Jonathan Silverman, Newt Gingrich	Gloria Estefan
4.150	April 29, 1996	(FROM CHICAGO) Arsenio Hall, Scottie Pippen	Peter Cetera
4.151	April 30, 1996	(FROM CHICAGO) David Schwimmer, Gene Siskel, Roger Ebert	N/A

=== May ===
No.	Original release date	Guest(s)	Musical/entertainment guest(s)
4.152	May 1, 1996	(FROM CHICAGO) George Wallace, Joey D'Auria, Mike Ditka, Shannon Ratigan, Sharon Stone	N/A
4.153	May 2, 1996	(FROM CHICAGO) Mark Grace	Buddy Guy
4.154	May 3, 1996	(FROM CHICAGO) Choral Ensemble, David Spade, Fred Nelson, Michael Jordan, Oprah Winfrey, Rip Taylor	N/A
4.155	May 6, 1996	Andrew Shue, Brett Butler, Rick Mazell	N/A
4.156	May 7, 1996	Anthony Edwards, Alyssa Milano, Mike Lukas	N/A
4.157	May 8, 1996	Charlie Sheen, Steve Forbes	N/A
4.158	May 9, 1996	Cheech Marin, Pierce Brosnan	Dwight Yoakam
4.159	May 10, 1996	Cindy Crawford, Eric Esch	Brian Setzer
4.160	May 13, 1996	Emily Young, John Larroquette, Marla Maples	N/A
4.161	May 14, 1996	Dennis Miller, Reggie Miller	Robbie Robertson
4.162	May 15, 1996	Jami Gertz, Jeff Stilson, Jim Fowler	N/A
4.163	May 16, 1996	Bill Paxton, Teri Hatcher	Def Leppard
4.164	May 17, 1996	Cade Woodward, Janeane Garofalo	Gin Blossoms
4.165	May 20, 1996	Emilio Estevez, Sean Connery	N/A
4.166	May 21, 1996	Amanda Beard, Paul Hogan, Ricky Jay	N/A
4.167	May 22, 1996	Anthony Clark, Heather Locklear	Suzanne Vega
4.168	May 24, 1996	Joan Embery, Sean Morey	The Neville Brothers
4.169	May 28, 1996	Carolina Panther, Fred Kahl, Kevin Greene, Kiva Kahl, Whoopi Goldberg	Kenny Loggins
4.170	May 29, 1996	Michael J. Fox, Franklin Graham, Rita Rudner	N/A
4.171	May 30, 1996	Brian Williams, Dennis Quaid	N/A
4.172	May 31, 1996	Chris Rock	Patti Rothberg

=== June ===
No.	Original release date	Guest(s)	Musical/entertainment guest(s)
4.173	June 3, 1996	Oscar De La Hoya	John Tesh, The Pointer Sisters
4.174	June 4, 1996	Kevin Nealon	Jewel Kilcher
4.1175	June 5, 1996	Adam Sandler, Nicolas Cage, Seyi Fayanju	N/A
4.175	June 6, 1996	Gary Hall Jr., Kelsey Grammer, Nicole Sullivan	N/A
4.176	June 7, 1996	Bill Maher, Pamela Davis	Tina Arena
4.177	June 10, 1996	Raquel Welch, Stevie Ray Fromstein	Linda Ronstadt
4.178	June 11, 1996	Billy Connolly, Robin Wright	Los Lobos
4.179	June 12, 1996	George Foreman, Wendy Guey	N/A
4.180	June 13, 1996	Dan Quayle, Jeff Ross	N/A
4.181	June 14, 1996	Cameron Finley, Jon Voight, Leisa Rito	N/A
4.182	June 17, 1996	Scott L. Schwartz, Sue Murphy	Davy Jones, Micky Dolenz, Peter Tork, The Monkees
4.183	June 18, 1996	Gemini Barnett, Leslie Mann	N/A
4.184	June 19, 1996	Jeff Foxworthy	Alison Krauss, Sanetta Y. Gipson
4.185	June 20, 1996	Arnold Schwarzenegger, Jim DeAngelo, Richard Jeni, Lisa Leslie	N/A
4.186	June 21, 1996	Carol Leifer	Garth Brooks
4.187	June 24, 1996	Christie Brinkley, Mark Schiff, Michael Johnson	N/A
4.188	June 25, 1996	Jenny McCarthy, Tiger Woods	N/A
4.189	June 26, 1996	Burt Reynolds, Kyra Sedgwick	Al Green
4.190	June 27, 1996	Eddie Murphy, Gary Payton	Tori Amos
4.191	June 28, 1996	Dennis Rodman, Rosie Gries, Richard Lewis	N/A

=== July ===
No.	Original release date	Guest(s)	Musical/entertainment guest(s)
4.192	July 8, 1996	Bruce Seldon, Jeff Goldblum	N/A
4.193	July 9, 1996	Denzel Washington, Justin Huish, Robert Klein	N/A
4.194	July 10, 1996	Andie MacDowell, Barry Bonds	N/A
4.195	July 11, 1996	Ross Bagley	Hootie & the Blowfish
4.196	July 12, 1996	Robert Pastorelli, Kevin Bacon	Southern Culture on the Skids
4.197	July 15, 1996	Conan O'Brien, Marc John Jefferies	Celine Dion
4.198	July 16, 1996	Kathy Ireland, Kevin Spacey	Tracy Chapman
4.199	July 17, 1996	Kobe Bryant, Michael Keaton	N/A
4.200	July 18, 1996	Joan Embery	Toni Braxton
4.201	July 19, 1996	Jackie Chan, Pat Hazell, Samuel L. Jackson	N/A

=== August ===
No.	Original release date	Guest(s)	Musical/entertainment guest(s)
4.202	August 5, 1996	Karch Kiraly, Kent Steffes, Robin Williams	Tom Petty and the Heartbreakers
4.203	August 6, 1996	Jamie Lee Curtis	Blues Traveler
4.204	August 7, 1996	Dan O'Brien, Fran Drescher	Crosby, Stills, Nash & Young
4.205	August 8, 1996	Kevin Costner, Tracey Ullman	Goo Goo Dolls
4.206	August 9, 1996	Kerri Strug, Kurt Russell, Wayne Federman	N/A
4.207	August 12, 1996	Dennis Miller, Steffi Graf	Gloria Estefan
4.208	August 13, 1996	Gwyneth Paltrow, Kurt Angle	Bryan Adams
4.209	August 14, 1996	Dana Carvey, Don Royston, Rene Russo, Robert Wuhl	N/A
4.210	August 15, 1996	Michael Johnson II, Norm Macdonald	Maxwell
4.211	August 16, 1996	Cheryl Tiegs, John Leguizamo, Peter Jennings	N/A
4.212	August 19, 1996	Jennifer Aniston, Sinbad	N/A
4.213	August 20, 1996	Kim Wayans, Tipper Gore	Harry Connick Jr.
4.214	August 21, 1996	N/A	N/A
4.215	August 22, 1996	Charlton Heston, Emily Young	Sting
4.216	August 23, 1996	Mark Banini	Better Than Ezra
4.217	August 26, 1996	Cameron Finley, Tim Matheson	Elvis Costello and the Attractions
4.218	August 27, 1996	Emeril Lagasse, Tom Arnold	N/A
4.219	August 28, 1996	Christy Martin, Damon Wayans, Mike Lukas	N/A
4.220	August 29, 1996	Bill Braudis, Bob Costas, Lisa Rinna	N/A
4.221	August 30, 1996	Angie Everhart	LL Cool J, Tap Dogs

=== September ===
No.	Original release date	Guest(s)	Musical/entertainment guest(s)
4.222	September 3, 1996	Jason Priestley, Steven Wright, Tim Scorfano	N/A
4.223	September 4, 1996	Jane Curtin, Sinbad	Dishwalla, J.R. Richards
4.224	September 5, 1996	Brett Butler, Joan Embery, Tiffani Thiessen	N/A
4.225	September 6, 1996	Isabella Rossellini, Norman Gary, Tim Meadows	N/A
4.226	September 9, 1996	Conan O'Brien, Halle Berry	Fiona Apple
4.227	September 10, 1996	Cameron Diaz, Dennis Franz	Brooks & Dunn
4.228	September 11, 1996	Bridget Hall, Scott Thompson	Jeff Daniels
4.229	September 12, 1996	Ozzie Smith, Pamela Anderson, Penn Jillette, Teller, Tom Rhodes	N/A
4.230	September 13, 1996	Diane Keaton, Nicholas Turturro	Patti Smith
4.231	September 16, 1996	David Hyde Pierce, Shannon Ratigan	Bette Midler
4.232	September 17, 1996	James Spader, Molly Ringwald	The Wallflowers
4.233	September 18, 1996	Brooke Shields, Jack Coen, Tara Dawn Holland	N/A
4.234	September 19, 1996	Brian Kiley, John Turturro	Dolly Parton
4.235	September 20, 1996	Jeff Foxworthy, Robbie Knievel, Sharon Stone	N/A
4.236	September 23, 1996	Donna D'Errico, Richard Simmons	Clint Black
4.237	September 24, 1996	Elizabeth Hurley, Michael Jordan	N/A
4.238	September 25, 1996	Dan Aykroyd, Tori Spelling	John Cale
4.239	September 26, 1996	Noah Wyle, Teri Hatcher	Natalie Cole
4.240	September 27, 1996	Geena Davis, Rob Schneider, Troy Winkel	N/A
4.241	September 30, 1996	Elizabeth Dole, Evan Davis	Kenny G

=== October ===
No.	Original release date	Guest(s)	Musical/entertainment guest(s)
4.242	October 1, 1996	Charlize Theron, David Hasselhoff, Jack Mayberry	N/A
4.243	October 2, 1996	Ally Walker, Chris O'Donnell, Paul Schneider, Schneider Sam	N/A
4.244	October 3, 1996	Hayden Panettiere, Michael Douglas	Paul Westerberg
4.245	October 4, 1996	Hugh Grant, Kristen Johnston	N/A
4.12461	October 7, 1996	Kareem Abdul-Jabbar, Maria Bello, Tom Hanks	N/A
4.12462	October 8, 1996	Ellen DeGeneres	Luther Vandross
4.246	October 9, 1996	Richard Dreyfuss, Claire Danes	Chris Isaak
4.247	October 10, 1996	Brian Williams, Jane Fonda	Cher
4.248	October 11, 1996	Adam Bloom, Adam Sandler, Rodney Dangerfield	N/A
4.249	October 21, 1996	Jennifer Tilly, Paul Reiser	Cirque Du Soleil
4.250	October 22, 1996	Don Rickles	Keith Sweat
4.251	October 23, 1996	Jeff Dunham, Liam Neeson	Sugar Ray
4.252	October 24, 1996	Chris Van Gee, Julianna Margulies	Mary Chapin Carpenter
4.253	October 25, 1996	Aidan Quinn, Clyde Peeling	Minnie driver
4.254	October 28, 1996	Greg Kinnear, Stephanie Gobran	Susanna Hoffs
4.255	October 29, 1996	Rhea Perlman, Richard Dean Anderson	Alan Jackson
4.256	October 30, 1996	Chris Bliss, Gabriel Byrne	Lucy Lawless
4.257	October 31, 1996	Bob Einstein, Cindy Crawford, Vince Vaughn	N/A

=== November ===
No.	Original release date	Guest(s)	Musical/entertainment guest(s)
4.258	November 1, 1996	Eric Idle, Jon Lovitz	Neil Diamond
4.259	November 4, 1996	Jada Pinkett Smith, Walter Matthau	Reba McEntire
4.260	November 6, 1996	Richard Dreyfuss, Nick Gass	John Mellencamp
4.261	November 7, 1996	Matt LeBlanc	Phil Collins
4.262	November 8, 1996	Dana Delany, Kelsey Grammer, Michael Chang, Sharon Bruneau	N/A
4.263	November 11, 1996	Bob Saget, Ricki Lake	Rent
4.264	November 12, 1996	Garry Shandling, Steve Whitmire	N/A
4.265	November 13, 1996	Alex D. Linz, Drew Carey, Joan Embery	Beck
4.266	November 14, 1996	Joan Embery, Margot Kidder	Dave Matthews Band
4.267	November 15, 1996	Brian Michael Tracy, Oprah Winfrey	Lionel Richie
4.268	November 18, 1996	Emilio Estevez	Harry Connick Jr.
4.269	November 19, 1996	Patrick Stewart	Barry Manilow
4.270	November 22, 1996	Amber Valletta, Dana Carvey, Shannon Ratigan	N/A
4.271	November 25, 1996	Gerry Swallow, Marisa Tomei, Scott Wolf	N/A
4.272	November 26, 1996	Jerry Rice, Mary Tyler Moore	Huey Lewis
4.273	November 27, 1996	Bill Gates, Rodney Dangerfield	Simply Red
4.274	November 28, 1996	Juliette Binoche, Nancy Kobert	Riverdance
4.275	November 29, 1996	Kelly Macdonald, Patrick Stewart	Deana Carter

=== December ===
No.	Original release date	Guest(s)	Musical/entertainment guest(s)
4.276	December 2, 1996	Chris Rock, Penny Marshall	Johnny Cash
4.277	December 3, 1996	Amy Brenneman, James Woods, John McCormick	Sheryl Crow
4.278	December 4, 1996	Angela Lansbury, Sylvester Stallone, Willie Barcena	N/A
4.279	December 5, 1996	A.J. Jamal, Courtney Thorne-Smith, Kevin Bacon	N/A
4.280	December 6, 1996	Jeff Bridges, Richard Lewis	Celine Dion
4.281	December 9, 1996	Pamela Anderson	Patti LaBelle
4.282	December 10, 1996	Joan Lunden, Sarah Ferguson	Julio Iglesias Jr.
4.283	December 11, 1996	Chris O'Donnell, Kelly Preston	Lyle Lovett
4.284	December 12, 1996	Denzel Washington, Sinbad	Joe Cocker
4.285	December 13, 1996	Kathy Kinney, Jim Fowler, Martin Short	N/A
4.286	December 16, 1996	Gillian Anderson, Ron Eldard, Vanessa Williams	Dave Matthews Band
4.287	December 17, 1996	Jamie Luner, Jimmy Carter, William Hurt	N/A
4.288	December 18, 1996	Courteney Cox, Ron Eldard	LeAnn Rimes
4.289	December 19, 1996	George Clooney, Rob Reiner	Melissa Etheridge
4.290	December 20, 1996	John Travolta, Laura Dern	Scott Weiland
4.291	December 23, 1996	Tom Selleck	Shirley MacLaine
4.292	December 26, 1996	Jonathan Lipnicki	N/A
4.293	December 27, 1996	Dom Irrera, Joan Embery, Walter Matthau	N/A
4.294	December 30, 1996	John Force, Sue Murphy, Willem Dafoe	N/A
4.295	December 31, 1996	Brett Daniels, Scott Thompson	Tony! Toni! Toné!

== 1997 ==
=== January ===
No.	Original release date	Guest(s)	Musical/entertainment guest(s)
5.1	January 1, 1997	Debbie Reynolds, Mae Whitman	N/A
5.2	January 2, 1997	Jeff Foxworthy	Paula Abdul
5.3	January 3, 1997	Brett Walkow, Jimmy Smits, Shannon Ratigan	N/A
5.4	January 6, 1997	Emily Young, Lauren Holly	John Michael Montgomery
5.5	January 7, 1997	Albert Brooks, Kristin Scott Thomas, Oscar De La Hoya	N/A
5.6	January 8, 1997	Kathy Ireland, Penn Jillette, Sam Donaldson, Teller	N/A
5.7	January 9, 1997	Cuba Gooding Jr., Diane Keaton	Better Than Ezra
5.8	January 10, 1997	Carrie Fisher, Megan Brooks, Troy Aikman	N/A
5.9	January 13, 1997	Kevin Costner, Tracey Ullman	Goo Goo Dolls
5.10	January 20, 1997	Geoffrey Rush, Goldie Hawn	N/A
5.11	January 21, 1997	Steve Guttenberg, Steve Young	N/A
5.12	January 22, 1997	Jamie Lee Curtis	Billy Martin, LL Cool J
5.13	January 23, 1997	Gloria Reuben, Rodney Dangerfield	Shawn Colvin
5.14	January 24, 1997	Gemini Barnett, Geraldo Rivera, Michael T. Weiss	N/A
5.16	January 27, 1997	Drew Bledsoe, Linda Hamilton	Carl Perkins, Dave Edmunds
5.17	January 28, 1997	Damon Wayans, Edgar Bennett, Sean Jones	Little Richard
5.18	January 29, 1997	Cameron Finley, Cheri Oteri, Kevin Spacey	N/A
5.19	January 30, 1997	Pierce Brosnan, Shannon Ratigan	Rod Stewart
5.20	January 31, 1997	Nancy Kobert, Pamela Anderson	Travis Tritt

=== February ===
No.	Original release date	Guest(s)	Musical/entertainment guest(s)
5.21	February 3, 1997	Tom Arnold, Tyra Banks	Wayne Newton
5.22	February 4, 1997	John Leguizamo, Heather Locklear	Cirque Du Soleil
5.23	February 5, 1997	Chevy Chase, Rebecca Romijn	Siegfried & Roy
5.24	February 6, 1997	Dennis Rodman, Tracey Ullman, Lance Burton	N/A
5.25	February 7, 1997	Martin Short	Pat Boone
5.26	February 10, 1997	Annie Wood, Chris Farley, Shannen Doherty	The Presidents of the United States of America
5.27	February 11, 1997	Bridget Fonda, Jamie Foxx	David Bowie
5.28	February 12, 1997	Donna D'Errico, Ira Katz, Matthew Perry	N/A
5.29	February 13, 1997	Fabio Lanzoni, Fran Drescher	N/A
5.30	February 14, 1997	Michael Biehn, Richard Simmons	Babyface
5.31	February 17, 1997	Joan Embery, Kevin Bacon	N/A
5.32	February 18, 1997	David Lynch, Gwyneth Paltrow	Aaliyah
5.33	February 19, 1997	Jerry Seinfeld, Tyra Banks	Gregory Popovich
5.34	February 20, 1997	Drew Carey, Salma Hayek	N/A
5.35	February 21, 1997	Amber Valletta, George Carlin	Luscious Jackson
5.36	February 24, 1997	Gabriel Byrne, Jonathan Lipnicki, Kellie Martin	N/A
5.37	February 25, 1997	Brooke Shields, Emeril Lagasse	Mindy McCready
5.38	February 26, 1997	Bob Zany, Christie Brinkley, Robert Urich	N/A
5.39	February 27, 1997	Jerry O'Connell, Martha Stewart	Greg Irwin
5.40	February 28, 1997	Patricia Arquette, William H. Macy	Squirrel Nut Zipper

=== March ===
No.	Original release date	Guest(s)	Musical/entertainment guest(s)
5.41	March 3, 1997	James Woods	Meshell Ndegeocello
5.42	March 4, 1997	Arsenio Hall, Kathleen Madigan	Billy Bob Thornton
5.43	March 5, 1997	Anthony Clark, Cuba Gooding Jr.	Blackstreet
5.44	March 6, 1997	Charles Barkley, Tim Allen	N/A
5.45	March 7, 1997	Howard Stern, James Carville	Jewel Kilcher
5.46	March 10, 1997	Lea Thompson	Deana Carter
5.47	March 11, 1997	Mia Farrow, Tommy Davidson	Robert Palmer
5.48	March 12, 1997	Barbara Hershey, John Ritter	Stomp
5.49	March 13, 1997	Dennis Miller, Laura San Giacomo	Collective Soul
5.50	March 14, 1997	Laura Dern, Marty Putz, Robin Quivers	N/A
5.51	March 17, 1997	Carlos Moyá, Mary Tyler Moore, Vivica A. Fox	N/A
5.52	March 18, 1997	James Caan, Jennifer Lopez	Johnny Cash
5.53	March 19, 1997	Marlon Wayans, Rosanna Arquette	Fiona Apple
5.54	March 20, 1997	Audrey Dochterman, Debi Mazar, Phil Hartman	N/A
5.55	March 21, 1997	Gene Siskel, James Spader, Roger Ebert	George Thorogood
5.56	March 31, 1997	Magic Johnson, Melissa Joan Hart	Michael Flatley

=== April ===
No.	Original release date	Guest(s)	Musical/entertainment guest(s)
5.57	April 1, 1997	Halle Berry, Michelle Kwan	Bee Gees
5.58	April 2, 1997	Kim Delaney, John Waters, Julie Scardina	N/A
5.59	April 3, 1997	Brian Williams, Elisabeth Shue	The Wallflowers
5.60	April 4, 1997	Craig Ferguson, Jennifer Tilly, Val Kilmer	N/A
5.61	April 7, 1997	Andre Agassi, Diane Lane	Cirque Du Soleil
5.62	April 8, 1997	Dennis Farina, Lisa Kudrow, Oscar De La Hoya	N/A
5.63	April 9, 1997	Carl Reiner, Jimmy Smits	Sheryl Crow
5.64	April 10, 1997	Jean-Claude Van Damme	Counting Crows
5.65	April 11, 1997	Dennis Rodman, Rodney Dangerfield	No Doubt
5.66	April 14, 1997	Glenn Close, Howie Mandel, Julie Scardina	N/A
5.67	April 15, 1997	Larry King, Minnie Driver	Richard Marx
5.68	April 16, 1997	Christopher Reeve, John Cusack, Richard Jeni	N/A
5.69	April 17, 1997	Julianna Margulies, Tony Gemignani	Duncan Sheik
5.70	April 18, 1997	Cindy Crawford, Doug E. Doug	Jon Secada
5.71	April 21, 1997	Kurt Russell, Rebecca De Mornay	N/A
5.72	April 22, 1997	Michael J. Fox, Penn Jillette, Stone Phillips, Teller	N/A
5.73	April 23, 1997	Carmen Electra, Kelsey Grammer	Micky Dolenz
5.74	April 24, 1997	Bill Paxton, Joan Embery	LeAnn Rimes
5.75	April 25, 1997	Mira Sorvino, Rob Reiner	Tina Turner
5.76	April 28, 1997	Debrah Farentino, Norm MacDonald	N/A
5.77	April 29, 1997	Alex D. Linz, David Helfgott	N/A
5.78	April 30, 1997	Anne Heche	Randy Travis

=== May ===
No.	Original release date	Guest(s)	Musical/entertainment guest(s)
5.79	May 1, 1997	Charles Kazan, Mike Myers, Veronica Webb	N/A
5.80	May 2, 1997	Clyde Peeling, Jenny McCarthy	Grand Funk Railroad
5.81	May 5, 1997	Jonathan Winters, Lance Burton, Sharon Lawrence	N/A
5.82	May 6, 1997	Billy Crystal, Robin Williams	Barry Manilow
5.83	May 7, 1997	Dana Carvey, Joey Lauren Adams, Terry Don	N/A
5.84	May 8, 1997	Joe Saba, Noah Wyle, Rebecca Romijn	Cyndi Lauper
5.85	May 9, 1997	Martha Stewart, Sinbad, Shannon Ratigan	Peter Cetera
5.86	May 12, 1997	John Lithgow	Tap Dogs
5.87	May 13, 1997	Jason Alexander, Joe Cavallo, Milla Jovovich	N/A
5.88	May 14, 1997	Linda Mason, Teri Hatcher	Paula Cole
5.89	May 15, 1997	Fran Drescher, Joe Saba	Depeche Mode
5.90	May 16, 1997	Chris Tucker, Matt Lauer	Jay Kay
5.91	May 19, 1997	Julianne Moore, Paul Reiser	James Taylor
5.92	May 20, 1997	Don Rickles, Jon Huber, Laura Leighton	N/A
5.93	May 21, 1997	Marcia Clark, Michael Richards	Robert Cray
5.94	May 23, 1997	Bill Maher, Bob Dole	N/A
5.95	May 27, 1997	Annie Wood, Jeff Goldblum	N/A
5.96	May 28, 1997	Vince Vaughn, Yasmine Bleeth	Erykah Badu
5.97	May 29, 1997	George Stephanopoulos, Kelly Preston	The Verve Pipe
5.98	May 30, 1997	Christian Malmin, Peta Wilson, Richard Lewis	Michael Flatley

=== June ===
No.	Original release date	Guest(s)	Musical/entertainment guest(s)
5.99	June 2, 1997	Alec Kerchner, Rene Russo	Bob Carlisle
5.100	June 3, 1997	Julie Scardina, Marla Maples	Vince Gill
5.101	June 4, 1997	Christa Miller, George Carlin, Robert Jordan	N/A
5.102	June 5, 1997	Mike Myers, Ruby Wax	Bush
5.103	June 6, 1997	Larry Wolff, Pat Riley, Paula Poundstone	N/A
5.104	June 9, 1997	Charles Shaughnessy, Sandra Bullock	Maestro Harrell
5.105	June 10, 1997	Charles Cozart, Gary McCord, George Clooney	N/A
5.106	June 11, 1997	Brendan Shanahan, Chris O'Donnell	Anita Baker
5.107	June 12, 1997	Arnold Schwarzenegger, Paulina Porizkova	Trisha Yearwood
5.108	June 13, 1997	Elle Macpherson, Hank Shores, Jim DeAngelo	Foo Fighters
5.109	June 16, 1997	Conan O'Brien, Harold Goodman, Marge Lintz	Meredith Brooks
5.110	June 17, 1997	Rachel Ticotin, Steve Kerr	Kirk Franklin
5.111	June 18, 1997	Dennis Rodman, Faye Dunaway	N/A
5.112	June 19, 1997	Gina Gershon	k.d. lang
5.113	June 20, 1997	Cameron Diaz, Evander Holyfield	Dean Dinning
5.114	June 23, 1997	Tate Donovan, Logan O'Brien	Patti LaBelle
5.115	June 24, 1997	Lea Thompson, Lisa Leslie, Rupert Everett	N/A
5.116	June 25, 1997	Drew Carey, Jackie Layton	En Vogue
5.117	June 26, 1997	Will Smith	Tom Jones
5.118	June 27, 1997	Emily Young, John Travolta, Tom Dreesen	N/A

=== July ===
No.	Original release date	Guest(s)	Musical/entertainment guest(s)
5.119	July 7, 1997	Joan Embery, Mary Kara, William Carter	Hanson
5.120	July 8, 1997	Jim DeAngelo, John Killian, Mara Wilson, Mills Lane, Tracy Winters	N/A
5.121	July 9, 1997	Linda Fiorentino, Martin Short	N/A
5.122	July 10, 1997	Jodie Foster	INXS
5.123	July 14, 1997	David Alan Grier, Richard Simmons	N/A
5.124	July 15, 1997	Reiley Beckie, Rob Lowe	Coolio
5.125	July 16, 1997	Guillermina Dolarea, Martin Lawrence, Thomas Haden Church	N/A
5.126	July 17, 1997	Jane Pauley, Kent Mahaffey	Beck
5.127	July 18, 1997	Billy Connolly	Tommy Lee
5.128	July 21, 1997	Harrison Ford, John Leguizamo	Pam Tillis
5.129	July 22, 1997	Joan Embery, Robert Wuhl	N/A
5.130	July 23, 1997	Joel Vavra, Patrick Stewart	John Pizzarelli
5.131	July 24, 1997	Kathy Ireland, Kel Mitchell, Kenan Thompson, The Pendragons	N/A
5.132	July 25, 1997	Evander Holyfield, Michael J. Fox	Radiohead
5.133	July 28, 1997	Peter Fonda, Zack Lemann	N/A
5.134	July 29, 1997	Carroll O'Connor, Spencer Breslin	Kenny Loggins
5.135	July 30, 1997	Lenore Shaffer	Lisa Stansfield

=== August ===
No.	Original release date	Guest(s)	Musical/entertainment guest(s)
5.136	August 1, 1997	Anna Kournikova, Glenn Close	Dwight Yoakam
5.137	August 4, 1997	Lance Burton, Venus Williams	N/A
5.138	August 5, 1997	Chris Meyer, Jonathan Taylor Thomas, Mira Sorvino	N/A
5.139	August 7, 1997	Emil Popescu, Jake Johannsen, Shaquille O'Neal	N/A
5.140	August 8, 1997	Carlos Mencia, Jennifer Aniston, Magic Johnson	N/A
5.141	August 11, 1997	George Olesen, Michelle Sorensen	John Fogerty
5.142	August 12, 1997	Lisa Kudrow, Peter Berg	Natalie Cole
5.143	August 13, 1997	Julie Scardina, Laurence Fishburne	Robyn Carlsson
5.144	August 14, 1997	Gary Sinise, Hunter Reno	N/A
5.145	August 15, 1997	Kevin Sorbo, Sylvester Stallone, Woody Brooks	Jennifer Love Hewitt
5.146	August 18, 1997	Lucy Lawless, Rodney Dangerfield	Lyle Lovett
5.147	August 19, 1997	Chris Tucker, Newt Gingrich	N/A
5.148	August 20, 1997	Demi Moore, Jeremy Northam	Deana Carter
5.149	August 21, 1997	Cameron Finley, Paul Reiser	k.d. lang
5.150	August 22, 1997	Christopher Walken, Ralph Louis Harris, Steven Seagal	N/A

=== September ===
No.	Original release date	Guest(s)	Musical/entertainment guest(s)
5.151	September 2, 1997	Clyde Peeling, Steve Oedekerk, Veronica Webb	N/A
5.152	September 3, 1997	Courtney Thorne-Smith, Ed McMahon	Clint Black
5.154	September 4, 1997	Alicia Silverstone, Alan Morgan	Matchbox Twenty
5.155	September 5, 1997	Karen Duffy	John Tesh, Jon Bon Jovi
5.156	September 8, 1997	Jason Priestley, Sarah Michelle Gellar, Steve Nave	N/A
5.157	September 9, 1997	Brooke Shields, Oscar De La Hoya	Amy Grant
5.158	September 10, 1997	Laura San Giacomo, Michael Douglas	Live
5.159	September 11, 1997	Bob Newhart	Garth Brooks, Trisha Yearwood
5.160	September 12, 1997	Carol Leifer, Pamela Anderson	N/A
5.161	September 15, 1997	Joan Embery, Mark Addy, Naomi Campbell	N/A
5.162	September 16, 1997	Joan Cusack, Michael Jordan	Kevin Spacey
5.163	September 17, 1997	Katherine Shindle, Kevin Kline	Alison Krauss
5.164	September 18, 1997	Kate Capshaw, Noah Wyle	Ragtime
5.165	September 19, 1997	David Caruso, Lennox Lewis, Matt Dillon	Alyssa Milano
5.166	September 22, 1997	Tim Allen	Elton John
5.167	September 23, 1997	Tony Danza	Carl Perkins, The Wallflowers
5.168	September 24, 1997	Clarissa Dickson Wright, Jennifer Paterson, Kirstie Alley	Boyz II Men
5.169	September 25, 1997	Dennis Rodman, Ellen DeGeneres, Kent Kasper, Vinnie Bazain	N/A
5.170	September 26, 1997	Jenny McCarthy, Russell Crowe	Carly Simon
5.171	September 30, 1997	Ashley Judd, David Schwimmer	Mary J. Blige

=== October ===
No.	Original release date	Guest(s)	Musical/entertainment guest(s)
5.172	October 1, 1997	Andre Agassi, Andy Richter	Beck, Willie Nelson
5.173	October 2, 1997	Claire Danes, Tom Selleck	Wynonna Judd
5.174	October 3, 1997	Julianne Moore	David Duchovny
5.175	October 6, 1997	Carl Reiner, Mel Brooks, Richard Lewis	Sarah McLachlan
5.176	October 7, 1997	Mark Harmon, Whoopi Goldberg	N/A
5.177	October 8, 1997	Tina Majorino, Tori Spelling	Micky Dolenz, Patty Loveless
5.178	October 9, 1997	Chris Rock, Jennifer Lopez	Duran Duran
5.179	October 10, 1997	Alexandra Wentworth, Jon Cryer, Keenen Ivory Wayans	N/A
5.180	October 13, 1997	Brett Favre, Goldie Hawn	Bryan White
5.181	October 14, 1997	Jennifer Love Hewitt, Sigourney Weaver	Maestro Harrell
5.182	October 15, 1997	Paul Sorvino, Timothy Hutton	Aerosmith
5.183	October 16, 1997	Keanu Reeves, Rowan Atkinson	Aaron Neville
5.184	October 17, 1997	Ethan Hawke, John Stephenson, Kim Delaney	N/A
5.185	October 27, 1997	Charlize Theron, Nick Di Paolo	Ice-T
5.186	October 28, 1997	Dennis Quaid, Gary Sheffield	The Cure
5.187	October 29, 1997	Jeff Gordon, Jenna Elfman, Mark Wahlberg	N/A
5.188	October 30, 1997	John Travolta, Peter Gros	N/A
5.189	October 31, 1997	Evander Holyfield, Oprah Winfrey	Sheryl Crow

=== November ===
No.	Original release date	Guest(s)	Musical/entertainment guest(s)
5.190	November 3, 1997	Bob Dole, Samuel L. Jackson	N/A
5.191	November 4, 1997	Dyllan Christopher, Fran Drescher	N/A
5.192	November 5, 1997	Chevy Chase, Rebecca Romijn, Roy Horn, Siegfried Fischbacher	Michael Bolton
5.193	November 6, 1997	Courteney Cox, Emeril Lagasse	Tom Jones
5.194	November 7, 1997	Dean Larit, Richard Gere	Shania Twain
5.195	November 10, 1997	Bai Ling, Drew Carey	N/A
5.196	November 11, 1997	Brooke Shields, Casper Van Dien	Vanessa Williams
5.197	November 12, 1997	Dustin Hoffman, Tim Russert	N/A
5.198	November 13, 1997	Cindy Crawford, Denis Leary, Shannon Ratigan	Blue Man Group
5.199	November 14, 1997	Dina Meyer, Rodney Dangerfield	k.d. lang
5.200	November 17, 1997	David Spade, Julie Scardina, Lance Burton	N/A
5.201	November 18, 1997	John Cusack, Traci Lords	Jay Kay
5.202	November 19, 1997	Bruce Willis, Dom DeLuise, Donald Trump	N/A
5.203	November 20, 1997	Candice Bergen, Mia Kirshner, Matt Stone, Trey Parker	Yanni
5.204	November 21, 1997	Pamela Anderson	Garth Brooks
5.205	November 24, 1997	Jon Voight, Martha Stewart	Enrique Iglesias
5.206	November 25, 1997	Barry Noble, Roma Downey	Kenny G
5.207	November 26, 1997	Lea Thompson	The Flying Karamazov Brothers
5.208	November 27, 1997	Helena Bonham Carter, Scott Thompson, Ralph Duren	N/A
5.209	November 28, 1997	Ben Brock	Meredith Brooks, Naomi Judd

=== December ===
No.	Original release date	Guest(s)	Musical/entertainment guest(s)
5.210	December 1, 1997	Halle Berry, Matt Damon	N/A
5.211	December 2, 1997	Isaac Mizrahi, Joan Embery, Minnie Driver	N/A
5.212	December 3, 1997	Alex D. Linz, Kevin Bacon	N/A
5.213	December 4, 1997	Alan Nash, Pierce Brosnan	LeAnn Rimes
5.214	December 5, 1997	Ben Affleck, Neve Campbell	Spice Girls
5.215	December 8, 1997	Jimmy Smits	Lisa Loeb
5.216	December 9, 1997	Lewis Browning, Quentin Tarantino	Alyssa Milano
5.217	December 10, 1997	Ann Curry, Tim Allen	Hootie & the Blowfish
5.218	December 11, 1997	Emma Thompson, Jimmy Carter	Jackson Browne
5.219	December 12, 1997	George Foreman, Kirstie Alley, Matt Stone, Trey Parker	N/A
5.220	December 15, 1997	Daisy Fuentes, Lee Evans	Maestro Harrell
5.221	December 16, 1997	Don Rickles, Ian Jackson	Celine Dion
5.222	December 17, 1997	Dale Midkiff, Richard Simmons, Sarah Michelle Gellar	N/A
5.223	December 18, 1997	Teri Hatcher, Tyson Beckford	Dwight Yoakam
5.224	December 19, 1997	Julie Delpy	Clint Black
5.225	December 22, 1997	Bill Paxton, Tiger Woods	N/A
5.226	December 23, 1997	Bridget Fonda, Logan O'Brien	BeBe Winans
5.227	December 29, 1997	Eddie Robinson, Peter Gros, Scott Glenn	N/A
5.228	December 30, 1997	James Cameron, Pam Grier	Smash Mouth
5.229	December 31, 1997	John Leguizamo, Scott Thompson	Little Richard, Tap Dogs

== 1998 ==
=== January ===
No.	Original release date	Guest(s)	Musical/entertainment guest(s)
6.1	January 1, 1998	Al Roker, Lisa Rinna	N/A
6.2	January 2, 1998	Rob Lowe, Dylan McDermott, Olivia Williams	N/A
6.3	January 5, 1998	Fran Drescher, Billy Zane	Ricochet
6.4	January 6, 1998	Kim Basinger, Greg Kinnear	Everclear
6.5	January 7, 1998	Kelly Lynch, Dennis Miller, Michael T. Weiss	N/A
6.6	January 8, 1998	Tracey Ullman, Robin Williams	N/A
6.8	January 12, 1998	Joey Lauren Adams, Denzel Washington	Backstreet Boys
6.9	January 14, 1998	Howie Long, Bob Newhart	Chumbawamba
6.10	January 20, 1998	Michelle Kwan, Kate Winslet, Burt Reynolds	N/A
6.11	January 21, 1998	Samuel L. Jackson, Harland Williams	Oasis
6.12	January 22, 1998	Trey Parker, Shannon Ratigan, Matt Stone	N/A
6.13	January 23, 1998	Famke Janssen, John Lithgow	Third Eye Blind
6.14	January 25, 1998	Bob Costas, Joan Embery, Jenny McCarthy, Richard Simmons	Shania Twain
Post-Super Bowl XXXII Show
6.15	January 26, 1998	Terrell Davis, Rupert Everett	Bryan Adams
6.16	January 27, 1998	Brett Favre, Angelina Jolie, Kevin Spacey	N/A
6.17	January 28, 1998	Yasmine Bleeth, Djimon Hounsou, Matt Zelen	N/A
6.18	January 29, 1998	Jennifer Love Hewitt, French Stewart	Jewel Staite
6.19	January 30, 1998	Kelsey Grammer, Rachel Weisz	Sarah McLachlan

=== February ===
No.	Original release date	Guest(s)	Musical/entertainment guest(s)
6.20	February 2, 1998	Shawn Colvin, Jane Leeves, Shaquille O'Neal	N/A
6.21	February 3, 1998	Kathy Ireland, Jesper Parnevik, Chow Yun-Fat	N/A
6.22	February 4, 1998	Jeff Goldblum, Jonas Pate	Kent Mahaffey
6.23	February 5, 1998	Dennis Rodman, Jeri Ryan, Phil Hartman	N/A
6.24	February 6, 1998	Jonathan Aube, Ryan O'Neal, Gwyneth Paltrow	Martina McBride
6.25	February 9, 1998	Calista Flockhart	Lyle Lovett
6.26	February 10, 1998	Helena Bonham Carter	Trisha Yearwood
6.27	February 11, 1998	Robert Duvall, Julie Scardina, Marlon Wayans	N/A
6.28	February 12, 1998	Kobe Bryant, Kim Delaney	N/A
6.29	February 13, 1998	Sharon Stone	Sounds of Blackness
6.30	February 16, 1998	Ross Rebagliati, Veronica Webb	N/A
6.31	February 17, 1998	Woody Harrelson	Patti LaBelle
6.32	February 18, 1998	Heidi Klum, David Schwimmer	Michael Bolton
6.33	February 19, 1998	Gina Gershon, Kathleen Madigan	N/A
6.34	February 20, 1998	Halle Berry, Maryellen Hooper, Jerry O'Connell	N/A
6.35	February 23, 1998	Pamela Anderson, Al Nino	Maestro Harrell
6.36	February 24, 1998	Elizabeth Berkley, Alana Davis, Arsenio Hall	N/A
6.37	February 25, 1998	Jenna Elfman, Noah Wyle	Ben Folds Five
6.38	February 26, 1998	Michelle Kwan, Richard Dreyfuss, Steve Nave, Shannon Ratigan, Joe Saba	Foo Fighters
6.39	February 27, 1998	David Caruso, Jim Lampley, Picabo Street	N/A

=== March ===
No.	Original release date	Guest(s)	Musical/entertainment guest(s)
6.40	March 2, 1998	Julianne Moore	Shaolin monks
6.41	March 3, 1998	Venus Williams	Usher
6.42	March 4, 1998	Martina Hingis, Jeremy Irons	N/A
6.43	March 5, 1998	Minnie Driver, Jack Riley, Kiefer Sutherland, Fred Willard	Billie Myers
6.44	March 6, 1998	Kim Basinger, Alyssa Milano	John Fogerty
6.45	March 9, 1998	Carrot Top, Joan Embery, Tom Selleck	N/A
6.46	March 10, 1998	Kevin Bacon, Gloria Stuart	The Mavericks
6.47	March 11, 1998	Carl Michael Linder, Julianna Margulies, Steve Van Wormer	Tim McGraw
6.48	March 12, 1998	Daniela Pestova, Garry Shandling	N/A
6.49	March 13, 1998	Neve Campbell, Al Franken	N/A
6.50	March 16, 1998	Lauren Holly, Gerry Red Wilson	N/A
6.51	March 17, 1998	Matt Dillon, Michelle Williams	Steve Earle
6.52	March 18, 1998	John Bizarre, Matt LeBlanc, Rebecca Romijn	N/A
6.53	March 19, 1998	Peter Gros, Wynonna Judd, Matthew McConaughey, Skeet Ulrich	N/A
6.54	March 20, 1998	Lacey Chabert, John Travolta	Jimmy Ray
6.56	March 30, 1998	Garth Brooks, Fran Drescher	N/A
6.57	March 31, 1998	William Hurt, Denise Richards	Joe Cocker

=== April ===
No.	Original release date	Guest(s)	Musical/entertainment guest(s)
6.58	April 1, 1998	Dana Delany, Damon Wayans	Richie Sambora
6.59	April 2, 1998	Kathy Ireland, Margaret Smith	N/A
6.60	April 3, 1998	Billy Crystal, Rick Majerus	Bring in 'Da Noise, Bring in 'Da Funk cast
6.61	April 6, 1998	Nicolas Cage	N/A
6.62	April 7, 1998	Mary J. Blige, Jack Lemmon, Walter Matthau, Robin Tunney	N/A
6.63	April 8, 1998	Gary Oldman, Meg Ryan	Trace Adkins
6.64	April 9, 1998	Patricia Arquette, Miguel Ferrer, Steve Irwin	N/A
6.65	April 10, 1998	Rodney Dangerfield, Natasha Gregson Wagner, Steve Van Wormer	Tim McGraw
6.66	April 13, 1998	Newt Gingrich, Hulk Hogan, Mimi Rogers	N/A
6.67	April 14, 1998	Dennis Franz, Jack Johnson	Savage Garden
6.68	April 15, 1998	Tyra Banks, Jay Mohr	Paula Cole
6.69	April 16, 1998	Natasha Henstridge, Bonnie Raitt, David Spade	N/A
6.70	April 17, 1998	Jennifer Aniston, Josh Brolin, Tiger Woods	N/A
6.71	April 20, 1998	Heather Graham, Jeremy Hotz, Ray La Mar	N/A
6.72	April 22, 1998	Norm Macdonald, Tiffani Thiessen	Vonda Shepard
6.73	April 23, 1998	Dan Gore, Hermann Maier, Shannon Ratigan, Arnold Schwarzenegger	N/A
6.74	April 24, 1998	Kim Caldwell, Faith Hill, Martin Short	N/A
6.75	April 27, 1998	Walter Beerman, Sarah, Duchess of York, Peter MacNicol	N/A
6.76	April 28, 1998	Spike Lee, Richard Simmons	Goo Goo Dolls
6.77	April 29, 1998	Alberta Dunbar Kelly Lynch, Lou Diamond Phillips	N/A
6.78	April 30, 1998	Laura Dern, Denzel Washington	Stevie Nicks

=== May ===
No.	Original release date	Guest(s)	Musical/entertainment guest(s)
6.79	May 1, 1998	Julie Scardina, Yasmine Bleeth	Marcy Playground
6.81	May 4, 1998	Heather Locklear	Chicago cast
6.82	May 5, 1998	Dennis Rodman	Aretha Franklin
6.83	May 6, 1998	Arsenio Hall, Gene Siskel, Roger Ebert	Blue Man Group
6.84	May 7, 1998	Jerry Springer, Sid Yost	Buddy Guy, Jonny Lang
6.85	May 8, 1998	Cindy Crawford	Cheap Trick
6.86	May 11, 1998	Don Rickles, Katie Holmes	Tori Amos
6.87	May 12, 1998	Paul Reiser	Olivia Newton-John
6.88	May 13, 1998	Candice Bergen, Sarah Michelle Gellar, Wayne Cotter	N/A
6.89	May 14, 1998	Jerry Seinfeld	Brandy Norwood
6.90	May 15, 1998	Brooke Shields, Michael T. Weiss, Trey Parker, Matt Stone	N/A
6.91	May 18, 1998	Warren Beatty, Joan Embery, Alonzo Mourning	N/A
6.92	May 19, 1998	Bob Costas	Cher, Dave Matthews Band
6.93	May 20, 1998	Lisa Kudrow, Todd Obuchowski	N/A
6.94	May 21, 1998	Carmen Electra, Bill Paxton	Fastball
6.95	May 22, 1998	Matthew Broderick, Christina Ricci	Björk

=== June ===
No.	Original release date	Guest(s)	Musical/entertainment guest(s)
6.96	June 1, 1998	Kent Desormeaux, Samuel L. Jackson, Maria Pitillo	N/A
6.97	June 2, 1998	Ed Harris, Jennifer Love Hewitt	Reba McEntire, Brooks & Dunn
6.98	June 3, 1998	Sandra Bullock, Bob Fasano, Magic Johnson	N/A
6.99	June 4, 1998	Jessica Lange	Rod Stewart
6.100	June 5, 1998	Jean-Louis Thémis, Jonathan Winters	Natalie Imbruglia
6.101	June 8, 1998	Oscar De La Hoya, Harrison Ford	John Fogerty
6.102	June 9, 1998	Konishiki, Steve Nave	Gloria Estefan, Davy Jones
6.103	June 10, 1998	Gillian Anderson, Hank Azaria, Rosalynn Carter	N/A
6.104	June 11, 1998	David Duchovny, Laura Innes, Chris Witting	N/A
6.105	June 12, 1998	Margo Dydek, Gwyneth Paltrow	Dwight Yoakam
6.106	June 15, 1998	Willie Barcena, Marilu Henner	Ringo Starr
6.107	June 17, 1998	Hulk Hogan, Howie Mandel, Dennis Rodman	N/A
6.108	June 18, 1998	Dennis Miller, Karl Malone	N/A
6.109	June 19, 1998	Chase MacKenzie Bebak, Anne Heche	Stevie Wonder, 98 Degrees
6.110	June 22, 1998	Arianna Huffington, Alyssa Milano	Lionel Richie
6.111	June 23, 1998	Ving Rhames, Sid Yost	Cherry Poppin' Daddies
6.112	June 24, 1998	Carrie Fisher	N/A
6.113	June 25, 1998	George Clooney, Ming-Na	Sarah McLachlan
6.114	June 26, 1998	Wendy Horton, Andie MacDowell	Brian Setzer
6.115	June 29, 1998	N/A	N/A
6.116	June 30, 1998	N/A	N/A

=== July ===
No.	Original release date	Guest(s)	Musical/entertainment guest(s)
6.117	July 6, 1998	Danny Glover, Julie Scardina	Semisonic
6.118	July 7, 1998	Lena Olin, Chris Rock	N/A
6.119	July 8, 1998	Willie Barcena, Gary Noel, Rene Russo	N/A
6.120	July 9, 1998	Cameron Diaz, Mel Gibson	Smash Mouth
6.121	July 10, 1998	Alicia Silverstone, Catherine Zeta-Jones	LeAnn Rimes
6.122	July 13, 1998	Sarah Jessica Parker, Geraldo Rivera	Trisha Yearwood
6.123	July 14, 1998	Gregory Jackson, Richard Simmons	N/A
6.124	July 15, 1998	Garcelle Beauvais, Jeff Foxworthy	N/A
6.125	July 16, 1998	Jet Li, Jennifer Lopez	Paul Doucette
6.126	July 17, 1998	Pamela Anderson, Carrot Top, Wolfgang Puck	N/A
6.127	July 20, 1998	Jay Mohr, Natasha Richardson, Tiffani Thiessen, Aaron Yamagata	N/A
6.128	July 21, 1998	Tom Hanks, Lindsay Lohan	Edwin McCain
6.129	July 22, 1998	Edward Burns, Jamie Lee Curtis	Vince Gill
6.130	July 23, 1998	Joey Lauren Adams, Antonio Banderas	N/A
6.131	July 24, 1998	Richard Anderson, Heather Locklear	N/A
6.133	July 27, 1998	Michael J. Fox, LL Cool J	N/A
6.134	July 28, 1998	Ian Davies, Dennis Quaid	Alan Jackson
6.135	July 29, 1998	Joan Embery, Kristen Johnston, Diamond Dallas Page	Cleopatra
6.136	July 30, 1998	Lacey Chabert, Isaac Mizrahi	Big Bad Voodoo Daddy
6.137	July 31, 1998	Bob Newhart (guest host), Michelle Williams	N/A

=== August ===
No.	Original release date	Guest(s)	Musical/entertainment guest(s)
6.138	August 3, 1998	Jon Cryer, Debbie Ducommun, Whoopi Goldberg	N/A
6.139	August 4, 1998	Drew Carey, Carla Gugino	Tony Rich
6.140	August 5, 1998	The Farrelly Brothers, Jenny McCarthy, Tom Sizemore	N/A
6.141	August 6, 1998	Joe Krathwohl, Gary Sinise	The B-52's
6.142	August 7, 1998	Nicolas Cage, Harland Williams	Squirrel Nut Zippers
6.143	August 10, 1998	Lisa Rinna, Vince Vaughn	Backstreet Boys
6.145	August 11, 1998	Esther Cañadas, Mitch Fatel, Fred Savage	N/A
6.146	August 12, 1998	Hallie Eisenberg, Marisa Tomei	Usher
6.147	August 13, 1998	Ben Levinson, Jerry Springer, Vanessa Williams	N/A
6.148	August 14, 1998	Steve Irwin, Julianna Margulies	Eagle-Eye Cherry
6.149	August 17, 1998	Arsenio Hall, Natasha Lyonne	Spice Girls
6.150	August 18, 1998	Joe Mantegna	Luther Vandross
6.151	August 19, 1998	Dylan McDermott, Rebecca Romijn	CPR
6.152	August 20, 1998	Rosanna Arquette, Lou Diamond Phillips, Dee Dee Myers	N/A
6.153	August 21, 1998	Rodney Dangerfield, Brooke Langton	Barenaked Ladies
6.154	August 24, 1998	N/A	Dolly Parton, Chayanne
6.155	August 25, 1998	Peter Gros, Salma Hayek, Richard Jeni	N/A
6.156	August 26, 1998	Angela Bassett, John DiResta	Emmylou Harris
6.157	August 27, 1998	Halle Berry, Rob Schneider	Mary Cutrufello
6.158	August 28, 1998	Ray Liotta	Brandy Norwood

=== September ===
No.	Original release date	Guest(s)	Musical/entertainment guest(s)
6.159	September 8, 1998	Nicole Sullivan, Jean-Claude Van Damme	En Vogue
6.160	September 9, 1998	Natalie Imbruglia, Famke Janssen, Magic Johnson	N/A
6.161	September 10, 1998	Timothy Hutton, Dedee Pfeiffer	N/A
6.162	September 11, 1998	Calista Flockhart, Steve Nave, Ian Michael Smith	NSYNC
6.163	September 14, 1998	Oscar De La Hoya, Donny Osmond, Marie Osmond	N/A
6.164	September 15, 1998	Shaquille O'Neal, Jules Sylvester	N/A
6.165	September 16, 1998	Nathan Lane, Meryl Streep	N/A
6.166	September 17, 1998	Lucy Lawless, Paul Reiser	Tori Amos
6.167	September 18, 1998	Zach Tyler Eisen, Brooke Shields	Al Green
6.168	September 21, 1998	Tim Allen, Christina Applegate	Patti LaBelle
6.169	September 22, 1998	Jenna Elfman, John Waters, David Willey	N/A
6.170	September 23, 1998	Nicole Johnson, Julie Scardina, Noah Wyle	N/A
Marine animals.
6.171	September 24, 1998	Pamela Anderson, Stephen King	Natalie Merchant
6.172	September 25, 1998	Sarah Michelle Gellar, Oliver Platt	Chris Isaak
6.173	September 28, 1998	Martha Stewart, Robin Williams	N/A
6.174	September 29, 1998	Gillian Anderson, David Teitelbaum	N/A
6.175	September 30, 1998	Kirstie Alley, Emeril Lagasse	Liz Phair

=== October ===
No.	Original release date	Guest(s)	Musical/entertainment guest(s)
6.176	October 1, 1998	Gina Gershon, Mark Vanderloo	Lucinda Williams
6.177	October 2, 1998	Cuba Gooding, Jr., Christina Ricci	Bonnie Raitt
6.178	October 5, 1998	Bette Midler, Keri Russell	N/A
6.179	October 6, 1998	Ed McMahon, Joe Montana, Sharon Stone	N/A
6.180	October 7, 1998	D.L. Hughley, Don Rickles, Laura San Giacomo	N/A
6.181	October 8, 1998	John Leguizamo, Sammy Sosa	Third Eye Blind
6.182	October 9, 1998	Shannen Doherty, Will Ferrell, Chris Kattan, Rob Reiner	N/A
6.183	October 12, 1998	Lea Thompson, Oprah Winfrey	N/A
6.184	October 13, 1998	Bo Derek, William H. Macy	Lyle Lovett
6.185	October 14, 1998	Kieran Culkin, Kurt Russell	PJ Harvey
6.186	October 15, 1998	Kim Delaney, Joan Embery	Hootie & the Blowfish
6.187	October 16, 1998	Trey Parker, Dennis Rodman, Reese Witherspoon	N/A
6.188	October 26, 1998	Kate Capshaw, David Spade	Deana Carter
6.189	October 27, 1998	Bryan Adams, Christopher Wolfe, James Woods	N/A
6.190	October 28, 1998	Kenneth Branagh, Hallie Eisenberg, Fred Tuttle	N/A
6.191	October 29, 1998	Roseanne Barr, Tate Donovan	Faith Hill
6.192	October 30, 1998	David Arquette, Alyssa Milano	N/A
Kids blowing bubbles

=== November ===
No.	Original release date	Guest(s)	Musical/entertainment guest(s)
6.193	November 2, 1998	Jon Lovitz	John Mellencamp
6.194	November 4, 1998	Courteney Cox, Chris Noth	N/A
6.195	November 5, 1998	Jamie Lee Curtis, Julie Scardina	Sheryl Crow
6.196	November 6, 1998	Ainsley Harriott, Courtney Thorne-Smith	NSYNC
6.197	November 9, 1998	Richard Branson, Fran Drescher, Brandy Norwood	N/A
6.198	November 11, 1998	Annette Bening	N/A
Child inventors
6.199	November 12, 1998	Matthew Perry, David Willey	Meat Loaf
6.200	November 13, 1998	Jennifer Love Hewitt, Zack Wamsley	Alan Jackson
6.201	November 16, 1998	Arsenio Hall	Garth Brooks
6.202	November 17, 1998	Stephanie Seymour, Garry Shandling, Jesse Ventura	N/A
6.203	November 18, 1998	Jimmy Carter, Nick Di Paolo, Charlize Theron	N/A
6.204	November 19, 1998	Yasmine Bleeth, Dana Carvey	Jewel
6.205	November 20, 1998	Curtis Brown, Michael J. Fox, Jonny Lang, Steven Lindsey	N/A
6.206	November 23, 1998	Rebecca Romijn-Stamos, Richard Simmons	Dixie Chicks
6.207	November 24, 1998	Cher, Will Smith	Shawn Mullins
6.208	November 25, 1998	Lara Flynn Boyle	Neil Diamond
6.209	November 26, 1998	Hulk Hogan	N/A
6.210	November 27, 1998	Penn Jillette, David Hyde Pierce, Shannon Ratigan, Henry Winkler	N/A
6.211	November 30, 1998	Dame Edna Everage, Dennis Franz	N/A

=== December ===
No.	Original release date	Guest(s)	Musical/entertainment guest(s)
6.212	December 1, 1998	George Foreman, Anne Heche	N/A
6.213	December 2, 1998	Jeff Goldblum, Melissa Joan Hart	Goo Goo Dolls
6.214	December 3, 1998	Charlie Sheen, Judy Sheindlin	Seal
6.215	December 4, 1998	Naseem Hamed, Julia Louis-Dreyfus	Hanson
6.217	December 7, 1998	Lisa Kudrow, Oliver Platt	Kirk Franklin
6.218	December 8, 1998	Cindy Crawford, Karl Malone, Freddie Prinze Jr.	N/A
6.219	December 9, 1998	Ben Affleck, Richard Jeni	Mariah Carey
6.220	December 10, 1998	Roberto Benigni, Gwyneth Paltrow	R.E.M.
6.221	December 11, 1998	Miss Piggy, Vince Vaughn	Garbage
6.222	December 14, 1998	Helena Bonham Carter, Sarah Michelle Gellar	Shawn Colvin
6.223	December 15, 1998	Bill Paxton	LeAnn Rimes
6.224	December 16, 1998	Woody Harrelson	N/A
6.225	December 17, 1998	Gillian Anderson, Billy Bob Thornton	Alanis Morissette
6.226	December 18, 1998	Joan Embery, Bridget Fonda	Sarah McLachlan
6.227	December 21, 1998	Greg Kinnear, Charlize Theron	The Brian Setzer Orchestra
6.228	December 23, 1998	Timothy Levitch, Robin Williams	N/A
6.229	December 25, 1998	Tyson Beckford, Teri Hatcher	Dwight Yoakam
6.230	December 28, 1998	Debra Messing, Julie Scardina	Barry Manilow
6.231	December 29, 1998	Matthew Helms, Marilu Henner	Lisa Loeb
6.232	December 30, 1998	Joe Krathwohl, Hayden Panettiere, Pete Sampras	N/A
6.233	December 31, 1998	Rebecca Romijn-Stamos, Carrot Top	N/A

== 1999 ==
=== January ===
No.	Original release date	Guest(s)	Musical/entertainment guest(s)
TBA	January 4, 1999	Felicity Huffman, Val Kilmer, Jules Sylvester	N/A
TBA	January 5, 1999	Newt Gingrich, Emily Watson	N/A
TBA	January 6, 1999	Cate Blanchett, Michael Caine	Martina McBride
TBA	January 7, 1999	Dennis Miller, James Van Der Beek	Brian McKnight
TBA	January 8, 1999	John Travolta, Tracey Ullman	Chris Isaak
TBA	January 11, 1999	Susan Sarandon, Eddie Izzard	N/A
TBA	January 12, 1999	Thomas Gibson, Melanie Griffith	Sugar Ray
TBA	January 13, 1999	Jamie Lee Curtis	Whitney Houston
TBA	January 14, 1999	Tom Hanks, Melina Kanakaredes	The Judds
TBA	January 15, 1999	Robert Downey Jr., Holly Hunter	Better Than Ezra
TBA	January 18, 1999	Sharon Stone, Steve Young	Bonnie Raitt
TBA	January 19, 1999	Danny Glover, Natasha Gregson Wagner	N/A
TBA	January 20, 1999	Joan Allen, Sean Connery	Lyle Lovett
TBA	January 21, 1999	Sarah, Duchess of York, Roberto Benigni	Everclear
TBA	January 22, 1999	Dennis Rodman, Mira Sorvino	Sheryl Crow
TBA	January 25, 1999	Ian Smith	NSYNC
TBA	January 27, 1999	Nicolas Cage, Harland Williams	Squirrel Nut Zippers
TBA	January 28, 1999	Cher, Will Smith	Shawn Mullins
TBA	January 29, 1999	Yasmine Bleeth, Dana Carvey	Jewel

=== February ===
No.	Original release date	Guest(s)	Musical/entertainment guest(s)
TBA	February 1, 1999	Maria Bello, Howie Mandel	Everlast
TBA	February 2, 1999	Hannah Davis, Shannen Doherty, Ed McCaffrey, Bill Romanowski	N/A
TBA	February 3, 1999	Shane Brolly, Jerry O'Connell, Sissy Spacek	New Radicals
TBA	February 4, 1999	Geena Davis	Garbage
TBA	February 5, 1999	Steve Martin, Brandy Norwood, Jerry Springer	N/A
TBA	February 8, 1999	Tim Allen, Kathy Ireland	N/A
TBA	February 9, 1999	Arsenio Hall	Emmylou Harris, Linda Ronstadt
TBA	February 10, 1999	Rosie Perez, Julie Scardina	N/A
TBA	February 11, 1999	Mel Gibson, Daryl Hannah	Natalie Merchant
TBA	February 12, 1999	Magic Johnson, Rebecca Romijn-Stamos	Collective Soul
TBA	February 15, 1999	Roseanne Barr, Kevin and Mark Simonson	Allison Moorer
TBA	February 16, 1999	Dave Foley, Michelle Kwan, Alyssa Milano	N/A
TBA	February 17, 1999	Heidi Klum, Matt LeBlanc	John Hiatt
TBA	February 18, 1999	Anthony Edwards, Steve Irwin	Blondie
TBA	February 19, 1999	Kevin Costner, Calista Flockhart, Bill Goldberg	N/A
TBA	February 22, 1999	Lance Burton, Rosie O'Donnell, Martin Short	N/A
TBA	February 23, 1999	Nicolas Cage, Rose McGowan	N/A
TBA	February 25, 1999	Ron Howard, Juliette Lewis, The Umbilical Brothers	N/A
TBA	February 26, 1999	David Duchovny, Bill Porter	Barenaked Ladies

=== March ===
No.	Original release date	Guest(s)	Musical/entertainment guest(s)
TBA	March 1, 1999	Lara Flynn Boyle, Carson Daly	N/A
TBA	March 2, 1999	Dennis Rodman, Billy Bob Thornton	Goo Goo Dolls
TBA	March 3, 1999	Chuck Norris	The Neville Brothers featuring Wyclef Jean
TBA	March 4, 1999	Sarah Michelle Gellar, Sean Hayes, Sean Patrick Thomas	N/A
TBA	March 5, 1999	Darrell Hammond, Evander Holyfield, Gwyneth Paltrow	N/A
TBA	March 8, 1999	Kelsey Grammer, Emily Watson	N/A
TBA	March 9, 1999	Ryan Phillippe, Lea Thompson	Julian Lennon
TBA	March 10, 1999	Billy Crystal, Rita Wilson	Eagle Eye Cherry
TBA	March 11, 1999	Isaiah Griffin, Bob Newhart	Jo Dee Messina
TBA	March 12, 1999	Ben Affleck, Selma Blair	Chris Isaak
TBA	March 15, 1999	Peter Krause, Richard Simmons	Shawn Mullins
TBA	March 16, 1999	Matthew McConaughey, George Stephanopoulos	Seal
TBA	March 17, 1999	Claire Danes, Naomi Nari Nam, Steven Wright	N/A
TBA	March 18, 1999	Rachel Griffiths	Sixpence None the Richer
TBA	March 22, 1999	Goldie Hawn	Elton John featuring LeAnn Rimes
TBA	March 23, 1999	Christina Applegate, Mavis Leno	N/A
TBA	March 24, 1999	Nick Moran, Anna Paquin	Monica Arnold
TBA	March 25, 1999	Ellen DeGeneres , Ahmet & Dweezil Zappa	N/A
TBA	March 26, 1999	Bob Costas, Kirsten Dunst	Alana Davis
TBA	March 29, 1999	Jackie Chan, Michael Michele, Larry Miller	N/A
TBA	March 30, 1999	Terry Bradshaw, Alyssa Milano	Sammy Hagar
TBA	March 31, 1999	Chris O'Donnell	Marvelous 3

=== April ===
No.	Original release date	Guest(s)	Musical/entertainment guest(s)
TBA	April 1, 1999	Jessica Biel, Jeremy Hotz, Keanu Reeves	N/A
TBA	April 2, 1999	Hallie Eisenberg, Courtney Thorne-Smith	Garbage
TBA	April 5, 1999	Ken Butler, Dennis Franz, Monica Keena	N/A
TBA	April 6, 1999	Jane Krakowski, Jon Stewart	Sugar Ray
TBA	April 7, 1999	Phil Palisoul, Shannon Ratigan, Rob Schneider, Leelee Sobieski	N/A
TBA	April 8, 1999	Kobe Bryant, William Goodrum, Teri Hatcher	Lee "Scratch" Perry
TBA	April 9, 1999	Hulk Hogan, Jennifer Jason Leigh	98 Degrees
TBA	April 12, 1999	Reese Witherspoon, Scott Wolf	NSYNC
TBA	April 13, 1999	Dustin Hoffman, Lucy Liu	N/A
TBA	April 14, 1999	Patricia Arquette, Brett Leake, Eric McCormack	N/A
TBA	April 15, 1999	Cher, Sean Connery	TLC
TBA	April 16, 1999	Angelina Jolie, John Lithgow	Lenny Kravitz
TBA	April 27, 1999	Jennifer Grey, Guy Torry	Britney Spears
TBA	April 28, 1999	Melissa Joan Hart, Jon Voight	The Black Crowes
TBA	April 29, 1999	David Spade, Catherine Zeta-Jones	Faith Hill
TBA	April 30, 1999	Carrie-Anne Moss, Judy Sheindlin	Ginuwine

=== May ===
No.	Original release date	Guest(s)	Musical/entertainment guest(s)
TBA	May 3, 1999	Ricky Schroder	Charlotte Church
TBA	May 4, 1999	Roma Downey, Dallas Page	Trisha Yearwood
TBA	May 5, 1999	Debra Messing, Tom Selleck	N/A
TBA	May 6, 1999	Julie Scardina, James Van Der Beek	Dixie Chicks
TBA	May 7, 1999	Keri Russell, Dylan McDermott	The Corrs
TBA	May 10, 1999	Portia de Rossi, Brendan Fraser, Shannon Ratigan, Sharon Turner	N/A
TBA	May 11, 1999	Rob Lowe	Steve Wariner
TBA	May 12, 1999	Kevin Cole, Heather Locklear, Cree Summer	N/A
TBA	May 13, 1999	Dana Carvey	Brandy Norwood
TBA	May 14, 1999	Pamela Anderson, Kevin Nash	Joe Henry
TBA	May 17, 1999	Jake Lloyd, Gretchen Mol	Andrea Bocelli
TBA	May 18, 1999	Samuel L. Jackson, Heidi Klum	Mandy Barnett
TBA	May 19, 1999	Steve Irwin, Bijou Phillips, Paul Reiser	N/A
TBA	May 20, 1999	Liam Neeson, Rebecca Romijn-Stamos	Lyle Lovett
TBA	May 21, 1999	D. L. Hughley, Jerry Springer	The Cranberries
TBA	May 24, 1999	Vlade Divac, Hugh Grant, John O’Connor	N/A
TBA	May 25, 1999	Bob Costas, Julia Louis-Dreyfus	Hootie & the Blowfish
TBA	May 26, 1999	Angie Harmon, Jesse Ventura	Ricky Martin
TBA	May 27, 1999	Jack Lemmon, Penn & Teller	N/A
TBA	May 28, 1999	Cuba Gooding Jr.	Wilco

=== June ===
No.	Original release date	Guest(s)	Musical/entertainment guest(s)
TBA	June 8, 1999	Cheryl Hayward, Damon Wayans	Ben Folds Five
TBA	June 9, 1999	Kate Hudson, Howie Mandel	Enrique Iglesias
TBA	June 10, 1999	Mike Myers, Rex Spjute	Tom Petty
TBA	June 11, 1999	Janeane Garofalo, Karl Malone	B*Witched
TBA	June 14, 1999	Ahmad Rashad, Noah Wyle	Jonny Lang
TBA	June 15, 1999	Esther Cañadas, Carrot Top, John Travolta	N/A
TBA	June 16, 1999	Dennis Rodman, Christina Ricci	Phil Collins
TBA	June 17, 1999	Richard Belzer, Adam Sandler, Madeleine Stowe	N/A
TBA	June 18, 1999	Dylan & Cole Sprouse, Robert Wagner	Edwin McCain
TBA	June 21, 1999	Camryn Manheim, Rob Schneider	Natalie Cole
TBA	June 22, 1999	Alex D. Linz, Dan Rather	Heart
TBA	June 23, 1999	Jamie Foxx, Kathy Ireland	Kenny G
TBA	June 24, 1999	Arsenio Hall, Sable	Charlotte Church
TBA	June 25, 1999	Trey Parker, Matt Stone	Smash Mouth

=== July ===
No.	Original release date	Guest(s)	Musical/entertainment guest(s)
TBA	July 6, 1999	Jeff Bridges, Leslie Mann	The Go-Go's
TBA	July 7, 1999	David Robinson, Mira Sorvino	Vince Gill, Patti Loveless
TBA	July 8, 1999	Adrien Brody, Julie Scardina	Jay Kay
TBA	July 9, 1999	Bill Bradley, Natasha Lyonne	Goo Goo Dolls
TBA	July 12, 1999	Rupert Everett, Kermit the Frog	Tim McGraw
TBA	July 13, 1999	Andie MacDowell	Old 97's
Singing birds
TBA	July 14, 1999	Joey Lauren Adams	Omar Epps
TBA	July 15, 1999	Bridget Fonda	Sarah McLachlan
TBA	July 16, 1999	Jon Stewart, Lili Taylor	The Pretenders
TBA	July 19, 1999	Tori Spelling, Darrell Hammond	Luscious Jackson
TBA	July 20, 1999	Charles Hardy, Judy Sheindlin, Tara Reid	N/A
TBA	July 21, 1999	Tatyana Ali, Denise Richards	N/A
TBA	July 22, 1999	Shannon Elizabeth, LL Cool J, Dan Quayle	N/A
TBA	July 23, 1999	Jason Biggs, Norm MacDonald	Elvis Costello
TBA	July 26, 1999	Richard Gere, Kevin Incikaya	Monica
TBA	July 27, 1999	Dane Andrew & Rascal, Doris Beezley, Wendie Malick	Jackson Browne, Shawn Colvin, Bruce Hornsby, Bonnie Raitt
TBA	July 28, 1999	Willie Barcena, Traylor Howard, Magic Johnson	N/A
TBA	July 29, 1999	Greg Kinnear, Michelle Trachtenberg	Geri Halliwell
TBA	July 30, 1999	Paul Reubens, Leelee Sobieski	N/A

=== August ===
No.	Original release date	Guest(s)	Musical/entertainment guest(s)
TBA	August 2, 1999	Lara Flynn Boyle, Will Ferrell	All-Star Reggae
TBA	August 3, 1999	Matthew Broderick, Steve Harvey	Earth, Wind and Fire
TBA	August 4, 1999	Rene Russo, Steve Harvey	The Verve Pipe
TBA	August 5, 1999	Haley Joel Osment, Susan Sarandon, Phil Tag	N/A
TBA	August 6, 1999	Heather Donahue, Ben Stiller	Tal Bachman
TBA	August 9, 1999	Dylan McDermott, Serena Williams	N/A
TBA	August 10, 1999	Heather Graham, Dennis Rodman	Ziggy Marley
TBA	August 11, 1999	Steve Martin, Katie Holmes	Julian Lennon
TBA	August 12, 1999	Esther Cañadas, Jean-Claude Van Damme	Lyle Lovett
TBA	August 13, 1999	Kim Delaney, Clyde Peeling	Missy Elliott
TBA	August 16, 1999	Eileen Collins, Cady Coleman, Hugh Grant	Maxwell
TBA	August 17, 1999	Sharon Stone, Michael C. Williams	Mary J. Blige
TBA	August 18, 1999	Rodney Dangerfield, David Willey	Bryan White
TBA	August 19, 1999	Halle Berry, Elayne Boosler, Joshua Leonard	N/A
TBA	August 20, 1999	Sarah Jessica Parker, Harland Williams	Brandy
TBA	August 23, 1999	Charlize Theron	Kris Kristofferson
TBA	August 24, 1999	Terry Bradshaw	Emmylou Harris, Linda Ronstadt
TBA	August 25, 1999	Albert Brooks, Marisa Coughlan	Meshell Ndegeocello
TBA	August 26, 1999	Katie Brown, Ted Danson	Sixpence None the Richer
TBA	August 27, 1999	Toni Collette, Brendan Fraser	Christina Aguilera

=== September ===
No.	Original release date	Guest(s)	Musical/entertainment guest(s)
TBA	September 7, 1999	Joan Embery, Bill Bellamy	Vitamin C
Headlines
TBA	September 8, 1999	Eric Idle	Brandy
Badly Named New Products
TBA	September 9, 1999	Kevin Bacon	The Bacon Brothers
Jaywalking, Kids Show and Tell
TBA	September 10, 1999	Martin Short, Mia St. John	Santana featuring Rob Thomas
You Make the Call, Jay interviews the Clintons' realtor
TBA	September 13, 1999	Lauren Holly, William H. Macy, Jack Coen	N/A
Headlines
TBA	September 14, 1999	Gina Gershon, Oscar De La Hoya	Bif Naked
Important Events and the Real Reason They Happened, Iron Jay for President
TBA	September 15, 1999	Kelly Preston, Jay Mohr	The Cranberries
Before They Were Here
TBA	September 16, 1999	Brooke Shields, John McCain, Larry Miller	N/A
Jaywalking
TBA	September 17, 1999	David Hyde Pierce, Mariska Hargitay	Collective Soul
Street Corner Love Connection
TBA	September 20, 1999	David Spade, Debra Messing	Martina McBride
Headlines
TBA	September 21, 1999	Rob Lowe, Melissa Joan Hart	Tori Amos
Crossword Answers, New Fall TV Shows
TBA	September 22, 1999	Harrison Ford, Molly Shannon, Siegfried and Roy	N/A
Ask Jay Anything
TBA	September 23, 1999	Pamela Anderson Lee, D.L. Hughley	Alanis Morissette
Jaywalking
TBA	September 24, 1999	Dennis Rodman, Kim Raver	Britney Spears
Dangerous Products
TBA	September 27, 1999	Richard Simmons	Garth Brooks
Headlines, a eulogy for the Quayle campaign
TBA	September 28, 1999	Yasmine Bleeth, Steve Zahn	Smokey Robinson
Jaywalking, Jay interviews Dan Quayle's campaign manager
TBA	September 29, 1999	Shannen Doherty, Neil Patrick Harris	Elvis Costello
Another Problem Solved
TBA	September 30, 1999	George Clooney, Durst quadruplets	Joan Osborne
Virtual Jay

=== October ===
No.	Original release date	Guest(s)	Musical/entertainment guest(s)
TBA	October 1, 1999	Keri Russell, Bruce McCulloch	Meredith Brooks & Queen Latifah
Idiots for a Day
TBA	October 4, 1999	Arsenio Hall, Alyssa Milano	Robert Palmer
TBA	October 5, 1999	Jenny McCarthy, Ben Crenshaw	Clint Black & Lisa Hartman Black
Satellite News
TBA	October 6, 1999	Elisabeth Shue, Steve Irwin	Nanci Griffith with Darius Rucker
Jaywalking
TBA	October 7, 1999	Liv Tyler, kid chefs	Brian McKnight
Request Line
TBA	October 8, 1999	Kirstie Alley, Oscar De La Hoya	Train
Tonight Show Sideshow
TBA	October 11, 1999	Judy Sheindlin, Mena Suvari	Cirque du Soleil
TBA	October 12, 1999	Ving Rhames, Thora Birch	Creed
Futurevision
TBA	October 13, 1999	Neve Campbell, Rita Wilson	Lou Bega
Jaywalking
TBA	October 14, 1999	Nicolas Cage, baby chimps	Natalie Merchant
Home Security Products
TBA	October 15, 1999	Kevin Spacey, Lacey Chabert	Blink-182
Dumbest Bosses of the Millennium
TBA	October 18, 1999	Jennifer Grey, Emeril Lagasse, Gary Gulman	N/A
Headlines
TBA	October 19, 1999	George Carlin, Rebecca Gayheart	John Popper
Truth in Labeling
TBA	October 20, 1999	Matthew Perry, Sela Ward	Alan Jackson
Jaywalking
TBA	October 21, 1999	Calista Flockhart, singing dogs	Jewel
Staff Inventions
TBA	October 22, 1999	Jennifer Love Hewitt, Bubba Blackwell	Big Bad Voodoo Daddy
Midnight Confessions

=== November ===
No.	Original release date	Guest(s)	Musical/entertainment guest(s)
TBA	November 1, 1999	D. L. Hughley, Lisa Nicole Carson	Barry White with Chaka Khan
Headlines
TBA	November 2, 1999	Scott Foley	Dolly Parton
Beyondo
TBA	November 3, 1999	Chris O'Donnell, Angelina Jolie	Robbie Williams
Ask Jay Anything
TBA	November 4, 1999	Pierce Brosnan, Heidi Klum	Marc Anthony
Virtual Jay, Jaywalking
TBA	November 5, 1999	Drew Carey, Denise Richards	Eurythmics
Interview with a Black farmer (Arsenio Hall)
TBA	November 8, 1999	Julie Scardina, Dennis Franz	Andrea Bocelli
Headlines
TBA	November 9, 1999	Roma Downey, Kevin Pollak, David Willey	N/A
Jaywalking
TBA	November 10, 1999	Elle MacPherson, Russell Crowe	The Mavericks
Ask Jay Anything
TBA	November 11, 1999	Dana Carvey, Maureen Rees	Faith Hill
New Shows for Sweeps
TBA	November 12, 1999	Courtney Thorne-Smith, Jerry Springer	k.d. lang
Who Wants to Cut a Million Hairs?, Sammy Hagar gets a haircut for charity
TBA	November 15, 1999	Lara Flynn Boyle, Lennox Lewis	Reba McEntire
Headlines
TBA	November 16, 1999	Faye Dunaway, kid magicians, Brian Kiley	N/A
Jaywalking
TBA	November 17, 1999	Salma Hayek, Christina Ricci, Jon Guenther	N/A
Harland Williams reports from SeaWorld San Diego
TBA	November 18, 1999	Johnny Depp, Sarah Michelle Gellar	Sugar Ray
Battle of the Jaywalk All-Stars
TBA	November 19, 1999	Heather Locklear, Brady Barr	Fiona Apple
Battle of the Jaywalk All-Stars
TBA	November 22, 1999	Arnold Schwarzenegger	Garth Brooks
Headlines
TBA	November 23, 1999	Tom Hanks, John Glenn	Puff Daddy
Jaywalking
TBA	November 24, 1999	Cameron Diaz, Sergio García	Enrique Iglesias
First Grade Thanksgiving Pageant
TBA	November 25, 1999	Rodney Dangerfield, kid turkey callers	Meredith Brooks
Virtual Jay
TBA	November 26, 1999	Noah Wyle, Emily Young	Melissa Etheridge
Finding a date for Kevin (with Gary Coleman)
TBA	November 29, 1999	Kate Winslet	98 Degrees
Headlines
TBA	November 30, 1999	Sigourney Weaver, Sean Hayes	Kenny G
Jaywalking

=== December ===
No.	Original release date	Guest(s)	Musical/entertainment guest(s)
TBA	December 1, 1999	Laura Schlessinger, Carrot Top, Christina Applegate	N/A
TBA	December 2, 1999	Rosie O'Donnell, Skeet Ulrich	Natalie Cole
TBA	December 3, 1999	Susan Sarandon, Portia de Rossi	Trisha Yearwood
TBA	December 6, 1999	Rob Schneider, Donald Trump	Michael Bolton
TBA	December 7, 1999	Michael Caine	Christina Aguilera
TBA	December 8, 1999	Jamie Luner, Dennis Quaid	Jewel
TBA	December 9, 1999	Hank Azaria	Celine Dion
TBA	December 10, 1999	Cate Blanchett, Bob Costas	Beck
TBA	December 13, 1999	Robin Williams	Blue Man Group
TBA	December 14, 1999	Michael Clarke Duncan, Sharon Stone	Bush
TBA	December 15, 1999	Geena Davis, Chow Yun-Fat	LeAnn Rimes
TBA	December 16, 1999	Jodie Foster, Chris Kattan	Charlotte Church
TBA	December 17, 1999	Tim Allen, Connor Matheus	Luscious Jackson
TBA	December 20, 1999	Norm Macdonald, Embeth Davidtz	Cirque du Soleil
TBA	December 21, 1999	Joan Embry, Jennifer Tilly	The Rockettes
TBA	December 22, 1999	Shaquille O'Neal, Winona Ryder	Chris Isaak
TBA	December 23, 1999	Jennifer Love Hewitt	Smokey Robinson
TBA	December 27, 1999	Brian Williams	Beth Hart
TBA	December 28, 1999	Haley Joel Osment, Joe Theismann	Joy Enriquez
TBA	December 29, 1999	Jeff Bezos, Martin Sheen	Al Green
TBA	December 30, 1999	Arsenio Hall, Bai Ling	Jimmy Buffett
TBA	December 31, 1999	TBA	N/A
NBC Millennium Special
