= Jeanette B. Milio =

American film producer

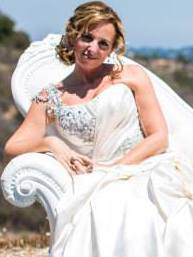
Jeanette B. Milio, Film and TV Producer

Jeanette B. Milio (born Jeanette Buerling; November 15, 1964 in Cologne, Germany) is a producer/executive producer and entertainment financier of motion pictures and television programming. Milio has worked in multiple areas of the entertainment business including development, production, distribution, sales, and entertainment financing.

== Career in film ==
=== Germany ===
Milio's career began in 1989 when she worked for the German network station RTL Television in Cologne. She was a production assistant and managed the production operations for several shows including the German format shows The Price Is Right (aka Der Preiss ist Heiss) and Traumhochzeit, Mini Playback Show, Family Feud (aka Familien Duel), Jeopardy, The Gong Show, and others. She then became the Managing Director for MB TV in Cologne and produced 52 one-hour episodes of the TV show Fun which aired daily on the Leo Kirch Network DSF in Germany.

Milio's first full-credit role as a producer came in 1993 with the one-hour prime-time drama series Wildbach, which was on the air for 5 seasons on the German network ARD.

In 1995, she produced her first motion picture Kreis der Angst (aka Circle of Fear), starring Katja Flint, Martin Umbach and Sandra Speichert. The film was directed by Thomas Jauch and was broadcast on the German network station ProSiebenSat.1 Media.

=== United States ===
Milio was granted a green card in 1999 and migrated to the United States with her then 11-year-old daughter.

In 2000 Milio produced her first globally distributed motion picture, Time Share, a comedy based on a script written by the Emmy Award-winning writer-producer Eric Tuchman. The film starred Timothy Dalton, Nastassja Kinski, Kevin Zegers, Billy Kay, Cameron Finley, Natalie Marston and Kelli Garner. The film was produced in co-production with the Disney ABC Television Group and the German distributor Constantin Film and was shot in Malibu, Balboa Island, and Munich, Bavaria. It was directed by Sharon von Wietersheim.

In 2010, Milio produced the thriller 13, starring Jason Statham, Mickey Rourke, Sam Riley, Ray Winstone, Michael Shannon and Curtis Jackson aka 50 Cent. The film was a remake of the award-winning 2005 Georgian - French film 13 Tzameti and was directed by the original director, Gela Babluani. The film was distributed by Paramount Vantage.13 describes the story of naive young man who assumes a dead man's identity to join an underworld game of Russian roulette to win $2 million. The film was shot in and around New York City.

The Experiment, produced by Milio, was a 2010 remake of Das Experiment (a 2001 German feature film based on the Philip Zimbardo's Stanford prison experiment directed by Oliver Hirschbiegel). The Experiment starred Adrien Brody, Forest Whitaker, Cam Gigandet, Clifton Collins and Maggie Grace. The film was written and directed by Paul Scheuring. The film was shot in Des Moines, Iowa and a portion of the film was shot in several locations in India. The Experiment was distributed in the US by a Sony Picture's specialty division.

Dark Tide, starring Halle Berry and Oliver Martinez, was produced by Milio and shot in Cape Town and London. Underwater scenes were shot in the Pinewood Studios outside of London. The film was inspired by a shark expert in Cape Town who is known as a “Shark Whisperer” and based on the book The Devil's Teeth and adapted into a screenplay by Amy Sorlie and Ronnie Christensen Dark Tide was directed by John Stockwell. In the film, the shark expert Kate (Halle Berry) begins to lose control over her life after her best friend and colleague was killed by a shark during one of her expeditions. Haunted by this memory, she is unable to step a toe into the water nor keep her shark-related business afloat. Financial distress causes her to accept the offer of a dying billionaire wanting to fulfill his last wish: to swim with a white shark – under Kate's supervision. Reluctantly she agrees to fulfill his wish, and a dangerous journey begins. The film was released by LionsGate.

Milio returned to television in 2014. She worked as a finance consultant on the television series Dog Whisperer, which was produced for 9 seasons and aired on the National Geographic Channel. The series was created, written, directed and produced by her husband Jim Milio.

Starting in 2014, Milio produced two seasons of the television series Global Beauty Masters, which aired on the Discovery Channel and on TLC. Both seasons were written and directed by her husband Jim Milio and starred Nicole Murphy, Manika, and John Paul DeJoria (founder of Paul Mitchell). The show was a beauty competition integrating hair, make up and styling, supported by brands including CHI, Wella, Schwartzkopf, ConAir, Revlon, and CosmoProf. Milio was the co-executive producer of the spin-off TV series The Look: All-Stars, starring Tori Spelling and Kim Vo, broadcast on The CW Channel.

Jeanette B. Milio is listed as writer and producer for Sexologist to be shot in Germany, Belgium and Spain and scheduled to air in 2019.

== Entertainment finance ==
Milio began working with various German-based entertainment investment firms in 2001, such as the Apollo Media Funding Group (Tristan and Isolde, Spartan, and Whale Rider) and the MediaStream Funding Group (Fast and Furious, Just Married, and The League of Extraordinary Gentlemen) and other media investment funds.

In 2004 Milio was hired as the finance director to manage Far East National Bank's entertainment finance funds Camden Equities and Hollywood International Finance which funded over forty film and television projects, which were then distributed by US network stations and studios including HBO, Showtime, USA, Disney/ABC, 20th Century Fox and Lionsgate Films. Milio managed the fund which produced titles such as Harvard Man, Sherlock, Wolf Girl, and Rent Control.

In 2005, Milio (under Jeanette Buerling) was named exec VP of production and acquisitions for L.A.-based Filmmates Corp where she managed Filmmates' project finance and international sales department.

In 2008 Jeanette Milio launched the motion picture investment fund operating under the entity Magnet Media Group. The group invested and produced theatrical motion pictures with a combined budget of approximately $60 million. The films were distributed by the specialty divisions of Sony Pictures, LionsGate and Paramount Pictures. In an article with ScreenDaily.com, Milio (under the name Buerling at the time) said their focus would be on "high-concept thrillers, action, and comedy films". In 2011, Magnet Media Group and Prime Focus (visual effects specialists) began a co-production deal for three pictures with a budget of $20 to $30 million.

== Leadership ==
Jeanette B. Milio is known as an expert speaker on matters of production, international co-production and entertainment financing. Jeanette B. Milio is a member of the Producer's Council for The Producers Guild of America, an executive member of Women in Film and a member of the Cannes Film Festival Producer's Network. In 2010 she was a speaker for Variety's Future of Film Summit in Hollywood, California. She is also one of the founders and board members of the Film Finance Forum in Zurich. Milio was a speaker at the inaugural Film Finance Forum in Zurich (2010), at the 63rd annual Festival de Cannes (2010), and again in Singapore (2011). Another notable appearance was as a speaker for the 2014 Global Female Leaders’ Summit in Zurich.

In December 2017, Jeanette B. Milio was added to the teaching roaster as an instructor with the UCLA's Entertainment Studies Program and teaches Entertainment Financing, as a part of UCLA X's Entertainment Business Management Program. Milio co-produced an entertainment finance specialty interview series under the brand “Film Finance TV” . The series includes interviews with professionals of the Hollywood industry, including producers such as Robert Cort, Cassian Elwes, production executives such Stage 32's founder Richard Botto, distribution executives such as Gary Rubin, Pascal Borno, and Clay Epstein, banking executives such as Adrian Ward and accounting specialists such as Gadi Wildstrom.

== Filmography ==
=== Films ===
Year	Film	Cast	Notes
1996	Kreis der Angst	Katja Flint, Martin Umbach, Sandra Speichert	Producer - as Jeanette Buerling
1999	Freeway II: Confessions of a Trickbaby	Natasha Lyonne, Maria Celedonio, David Alan Grier	Executive Producer - as Jeanette Buerling
2000	Time Share	Natassja Kinski, Timothy Dalton, Kevin Zegers	Producer - as Jeanette Buerling
2001	Harvard Man	Sarah Michelle Gellar, Adrian Grenier, Joey Lauren Adams	Executive Producer - as Jeanette Buerling-Milio
2004	Living Life	Dick Arnold, Denea Banning, Patrick Chu	Executive Producer - as Jeanette Buerling
2010	13	Sam Riley, Alice Barrett, Gaby Hoffmann, Mickey Rourke	Producer - as Jeanette Buerling
2010	The Experiment	Adrien Brody, Cam Cigandet, Forest Whitaker	Producer - as Jeanette Buerling
2012	Dark Tide	Halle Berry, Oliver Martinez, Ralph Brown	Producer - as Jeanette Buerling

=== Television ===
==== Television films ====
Year	Film	Cast	Notes
2001	Wolf Girl	Shelby Fenner, Shawn Ashmore, Tony Denman	Executive Producer - as Jeanette Buerling
2002	Sherlock	James D'Arcy, Roger Morlidge, Gabrielle Anwar	Executive Producer - as Jeanette Buerling
2003	Rent Control	Melissa Joan Hart, Ryan Browning, Carmen Electra	Executive Producer - as Jeanette Buerling
2013	Venice Beach	Veronica Alicino, Azin Fahimi, Franziska Huber	Executive Producer - as Jeanette Buerling-Milio

==== Television series ====
- Der Preis ist heiß (1989-1993) TV Series (Assistant Producer)
- Familien-Duell (1992) TV Series (Producer)
- Wildbach (1993-1997) TV Series (Producer)
- Mini Playback Show (1994-1997) TV Series (Assistant Producer)
- Global Beauty Masters (2014) TV Series (Executive Producer, Writer - 3 episodes, Director - 1 Episode)
- Q N' A with Mikki and Shay (2015) TV Series (Appearance - herself)
- Diabolical (2018) TV Series Documentary (Producer - 3 episodes)
- The Look All Stars (2018) TV Series (Co-executive Producer - 1 episode)
