= Thoko Ntshinga =

South African actress

- Born: Thoko Ntshinga; 1953 (age 72–73); Cape Town, South Africa
- Occupations: Actress, Director, Translator, Community theatre facilitator, Arts activist
- Years active: 1970–present
- Children: 2
- Awards: Fleur du Cap Theatre Award

Thoko Ntshinga (born 1953) is a South African actress, director, translator, community theatre facilitator and arts activist. She is best known for the roles in the television series such as; Egoli: Place of Gold, Interrogation Room and The River.

== Personal life ==
Ntshinga was born in 1953 in Langa, Cape Town, South Africa to a musical family.

== Career ==
Her acting career started in the 1970s with theatre plays. When she was a single parent with a two-year-old daughter, she made into an audition notice for the Space Theatre. On stage, she performed in the critically acclaimed play Fröken Julie, for which she won a Fleur du Cap Theatre Award. At the Space Theatre, she performed in the plays such as; A Flea in her Ear, Four Twins, The Incredible Vanishing, Lysistrata S.A., Nongogo, Patty Hearst, Rape – A Revue and The Sacrifice of Kreli. Then she joined Barney Simon at the Market Theatre and performed in the plays Cincinnati, Born in the RSA (1985), Panorama (1987/88) and Auditioning Angels.

In 1981, she made her television debut with the series Westgate. Then in 1982, she reprised the role "Westgate receptionist" in Westgate II. In 1983, she made her film debut with the direct-to-video film Farce About Uys. Since then, she appeared in many films such as; Skating on Thin Uys (as "Sophie"), A Place for Weeping (as "Joseph's Widow"), Born in the RSA, Act of Piracy (as "Cynthia") and in A Dry White Season (as "Emily"). In 1991, she joined with the original regular cast of the M-Net soap opera Egoli: Place of Gold where she played the role "Donna Makaula". Her role became highly popular, and she continued to play the role for thirteen consecutive seasons of the show until 2010.

In the meantime in 2005, she played the role of "Senior Superintendent Nomsa Dlamba" on the SABC1 drama series Interrogation Room. She reprised the role for the first four seasons of the show until 2008. In 2016, she made a minor role as "Female Driver" in the Universal TV miniseries Cape Town. Then in 2018, she appeared in two serials: as "Ma Mabatha" in the Mzansi Magic drama Nkululeko and then as "Nomhle" in the first two seasons of 1Magic telenovela The River. In the latter, she reprised her role in the fourth season. In 2019, she joined with the kykNET supernatural police procedural series Die Spreeus to play the role "Thulani". In 2021, she played the role "Funeka Mdwaba" in the SABC2 telenovela Die Sentrum.

At the 2018 South African Film and Television Awards (SAFTAs), she was honored with The Golden Horn Award for Lifetime Achievement for her contribution to the South African drama. Apart from acting, she involved in the Inclusive Arts Programme at Artscape in Cape Town. Meanwhile, she founded the skills development project called Our organization, the Thoko Ntshinga Foundation, which has partnered with youth empowerment organizations such as "Africa Jam" and "Bavuse Balele" to uplift the young artists in rural Kirkwood in the Eastern Cape.

As a stage director, she directed the 2015 play revival Born in the RSA. Then in 2017, she produced the play Buzani Ku Bawo for Artscape. In the meantime, she served as the Director of Artscape’s Inclusive Arts Unit.

== Filmography ==
Year	Film	Role	Genre	Ref.
1981	Westgate	Westgate receptionist	TV series	
1982	Westgate II	Westgate receptionist	TV series	
1983	Farce About Uys	Sophie the Maid	Video	
1985	Skating on Thin Uys	Sophie	Film	
1986	Place of Weeping	Joseph's Widow	Film	
1986	Born in the RSA		Film	
1988	Act of Piracy	Cynthia	Film	
1989	A Dry White Season	Emily	Film	1990 || ’’Velaphi’’ || Joyce||Siticom||
1991	Egoli: Place of Gold	Donna Makaula	TV series	
1994	Ipi Tombi	dialogue coach	Film	
1999	A Reasonable Man	Attorney Nicci Ngwenya	Film	
2005	Interrogation Room	Senior Superintendent Nomsa Dlamba	TV series	
2006	Surviving Katrina	Grandma	TV movie documentary	
2007	Mein Traum von Afrika	Abeba	TV movie	
2007	Anner House	Suo. Langa	TV movie	
2007	Goodbye Bafana	dialogue coach	Film	
2007	The Bird Can't Fly	Fair	TV series	
2009	Firstborn	Alina	Short film	
2012	Dark Tide	Zukie	TV series	
2015	Wallander	Miranda Khulu	TV series	
2016	Cape Town	Female Driver	TV series	
2018	Nkululeko	Ma Mabatha	TV series	
2018	The River	Nomhle	TV series	
2019	Die Spreeus	Thulani	TV series	
2019	Sizohlala	Mam Confidence	Short film	
2020	7de Laan	Nothemba	TV series	
2021	Die Sentrum	Funeka Mdwaba	TV series	
2021	Blood & Water	Gogo Bhele	TV series	
