= Johnny Skidmarks =

- Directed by: John Raffo
- Written by: William Preston Robertson; John Raffo
- Produced by: John Dunning; Frank Hildebrand; Andre Link; Michael Paseornek; William Preston Robertson; Jeff Sackman; Karen Severin; Karen Weaver
- Starring: Peter Gallagher; Frances McDormand; John Lithgow
- Cinematography: Bernd Heinl
- Edited by: Sean Albertson
- Music by: Brian Langsbard
- Distributed by: Cinépix Film Properties
- Release date: January 23, 1998
- Running time: 96 minutes
- Countries: Canada; United States
- Language: English

Johnny Skidmarks is a 1998 mystery thriller film directed by John Raffo.

== Synopsis ==
Crime scene photographer Johnny Scardino (aka Johnny Skidmarks) is working on the side for a group of blackmailers, photographing wealthy guys in seedy motels with prostitutes. One such assignment turns the wrong way and the blackmailers he works for start dying one by one in more and more brutal ways. Is Johnny the next on the list?

== Cast ==
- Peter Gallagher as Johnny Scardino / Johnny Skidmarks
- Frances McDormand as Alice
- John Lithgow as Sergeant Larry Skovik
- John Kapelos as Walter Lippinscott
- Jack Black as Jerry
- Charlie Spradling as Lorraine
- Geoffrey Lower as Woody Warshawski
