= One True Love (2000 film) =

2000 American television film

- Directed by: Lorraine Senna
- Starring: David Hasselhoff; Terry Farrell; Doris Roberts
- Country of origin: United States
- Original language: English

Production
- Running time: 96 minutes

Original release
- Network: CBS
- Release: October 25, 2000

One True Love is a 2000 American television film directed by Lorraine Senna.

== Cast ==
- David Hasselhoff - Mike Grant
- Terry Farrell - Dana Boyer
- Paget Brewster - Tina
- Cameron Finley - Corey
- Karl Pruner - Phil Davis
- Doris Roberts - Lillian
- Meg Hogarth - Maureen Grant
- Greg Ellwand - Paul Grant
- Katie Boland - Laura
- Marnie McPhail - Lucy Pearl
