= Time Share (2000 film) =

2000 American TV movie

- Written by: Eric Tuchman
- Directed by: Sharon von Wietersheim
- Starring: Nastassja Kinski; Timothy Dalton; Kevin Zegers; Cameron Finley; Billy Kay; Natalie Elizabeth Marston; Geoffrey Lower; Kelli Garner
- Countries of origin: United States; Germany
- Original language: English

Production
- Producers: Jeanette Buerling; Alexandra Hoesdorff
- Running time: 87 minutes

Original release
- Network: Fox Family Channel
- Release: June 18, 2000

Time Share is a television film directed by Sharon von Wietersheim and starring Nastassja Kinski and Timothy Dalton. It premiered on Fox Family Channel on June 18, 2000.

Two single parents, Dr. Julia Weiland and Matthew 'Matt' Farragher, along with their children, have to involuntarily share a house on Balboa Island, Newport Beach for their holidays. The film was a hit when first aired on the then-Fox Family Channel (now Freeform), and was subsequently dubbed internationally. It is available in Region 2 German.

== Cast ==
- Nastassja Kinski as Dr. Julia Weiland
- Timothy Dalton as Matthew 'Matt' Farragher
- Kevin Zegers as Thomas Weiland
- Cameron Finley as Max Weiland
- Billy Kay as Lewis Farragher
- Natalie Elizabeth Marston as Daphne Farragher
- Carlton Gebbia as Felice Templeton
- Geoffrey Lower as Russell
- Kelli Garner as Kelly the Beach Girl
- Randolph Mantooth as Ken Crandall
- John Hostetter as Sam

== Release ==
Country	Date
United States	June 18, 2000
Germany	November 23, 2000
Italy	January 25, 2001 (TV premiere)
Sweden	March 27, 2005 (TV premiere)
Belgium	January 25, 2009

- Also known as
  - 2 i én (Denmark)
  - Bitter Suite (UK)
  - Como Água e Vinho (Brazil) / (TV title)
  - Encontro às Avessas (Brazil)
  - Juntos, pero no revueltos (Spain)
  - Se cucini, ti sposo (Italy)
  - Time Share (Germany) / (DVD title)
  - Time Share – Doppelpack im Ferienhaus (Germany) / (TV title)
  - Timeshare (Germany)
  - Vacances sucrées-salées (Canada) / (French title)
  - Таймшер (Russia)
