= Dark Tide =

- Theatrical release poster
- Directed by: John Stockwell
- Screenplay by: Ronnie Christensen; Amy Sorlie
- Story by: Amy Sorlie
- Produced by: Jeanette B. Milio
- Starring: Halle Berry; Olivier Martinez; Ralph Brown
- Cinematography: Jean-François Hensgens
- Edited by: Andrew MacRitchie
- Music by: Mark Sayfritz
- Production companies: Row 1 Productions; Mirabelle Pictures
- Distributed by: Wrekin Hill Entertainment; Alliance Cinema
- Release dates: March 8, 2012 (video on demand); March 30, 2012 (limited release)
- Running time: 114 minutes
- Countries: United States; United Kingdom; South Africa
- Language: English
- Budget: $25 million
- Box office: $1.1 million

Dark Tide is a 2012 action horror film directed by John Stockwell, produced by Jeanette Buerling (aka Jeanette B. Milio) and Matthew E. Chausse and written by Ronnie Christensen and Amy Sorlie. The film is based on a story by Amy Sorlie and stars Halle Berry, Olivier Martinez, and Ralph Brown. The film was highly panned by critics and was a box-office bomb.

== Plot ==
Kate is a shark expert whose business has been failing since a shark attack killed a fellow diver under her command. Once dubbed "the shark whisperer", Kate is haunted by the memory of the attack and unable to get back into the water. With bills piling up and the bank about to foreclose on Kate's boat, Kate's estranged husband, Jeff, presents her with a lucrative opportunity: to lead a thrill-seeking millionaire businessman and his teenage son on a dangerous shark dive - outside the cage. Battling her self-doubts and fear, Kate accepts the proposal and sets a course for the world's deadliest feeding ground, "Shark Alley".

== Cast ==
- Halle Berry as Kate Mathieson
- Olivier Martinez as Jeff Mathieson
- Ralph Brown as William Brady
- Luke Tyler as Luke Brady
- Mark Elderkin as Tommy Phillips
- Sizwe Msutu as Themba
- Thoko Ntshinga as Zukie

== Production ==
Production began in July 2010 in False Bay, Cape Town, South Africa, and shot for six weeks on a small boat with real great white sharks. The production then moved to the UK for three weeks filming in Pinewood Studios on the underwater stage and at Black Hangar Studios on their external water tank. The soundtrack was written and performed by Mark Sayfritz.

== Reception ==
On Rotten Tomatoes, the film has a rare approval rating of 0% based on reviews from 19 critics, with an average rating of 2.8/10. The site's critical consensus reads: "Shallow and brackish, Dark Tide fails to rise". On Metacritic, it has a score of 23% based on reviews from 4 critics, indicating "generally unfavorable" reviews.

== See also ==
- List of films with a 0% rating on Rotten Tomatoes
- List of killer shark films
