= Geoffrey Lower =

American actor

- Born: March 19, 1963 (age 63); Casper, Wyoming, U.S.
- Occupation: Actor
- Years active: 1986–present
- Spouse: Karen Severin (?–present)
- Children: 1

Geoffrey Lower (born March 19, 1963) is an American actor known for playing Reverend Timothy Johnson on Dr. Quinn, Medicine Woman. He also played Monica Geller's boyfriend Alan in the Friends episode "The One With the Thumb".

== Early life and education ==
Lower grew up in Casper, Wyoming. He attended the University of Nebraska–Lincoln and Juilliard School.

== Career ==
Lower's contemporary theater credits include What Doesn't Kill Us at the McCadden Theatre in Hollywood, California, There's One in Every Marriage at P.R.T.E. and The Marrieds at the Whitmore-Lindley Theatre Center. In addition to six seasons as the Rev. Timothy Johnson on the CBS-TV series Dr. Quinn, Medicine Woman, Lower's television career includes two seasons on The Trials of Rosie O'Neill (1990), as well as many guest appearances on numerous other TV series, with one notable appearance on NBC's Quantum Leap as Confederate officer Lieutenant Montgomery in the Season 5 episode "The Leap Between The States". His film appearances have placed him alongside a wide array of award-winning acting colleagues, which include Frances McDormand, John Lithgow, Robin Williams, Peter Gallagher, and Giancarlo Giannini.

He has appeared on HGTV's House Hunters Renovation program, in Silver Lake, California, where Lower works as a general contractor and carpenter. On this episode, he was assisting in the homeowner's renovation of their new, Spanish-style bungalow.

He appeared in a stage production of The Graduate at the Laguna Playhouse as Mr. Robinson, opposite Melanie Griffith as Mrs. Robinson.

== Personal life ==
Lower lives in Los Angeles with his wife, producer Karen Severin.

== Filmography ==
=== Film ===
Year	Title	Role	Notes
1991	Hook	Brad	
1994	Heaven Sent	Parker	
1997	Heaven Before I Die	Sterrea	
1998	Johnny Skidmarks	Woody Warshawski	
1999	Avalanche	Jay Weston	
2000	Time Share	Russell	
2000	More Dogs Than Bones	Policeman	
2000	Housebound	Jarrid	
2020	Disrupted	Harold Price	

=== Television ===
Year	Title	Role	Notes
1990–1992	The Trials of Rosie O'Neill	Udell Correy III	9 episodes
1991	My Life and Times	Merlino	Episode: "Fare on Park Avenue "
1991	Silverfox	Jeffrey Campbell	Television film
1992	Jake and the Fatman	Edward Bolton	Episode: "Mickey Daytona"
1993	Quantum Leap	Lt. Richard Montgomery	Episode: "The Leap Between States"
1993	Matlock	Terry Landis	Episode: "The Obsession"
1993	And the Band Played On	Dr. David Simpson	Television film
1993–1998	Dr. Quinn, Medicine Woman	Rev. Timothy Johnson	113 episodes
1994	Friends	Alan	Episode: "The One With the Thumb"
1995	Hudson Street	Jay Gallagher	Episode: "Crime, Per Se"
1995	The Naked Truth	Edward Dane	1 episode
1996	Simon	Doc	Episode: "Simon Night Fever"
1998	Beverly Hills, 90210	Gene	Episode: "The Nature of Nurture"
1999	Dr. Quinn, Medicine Woman: The Movie	Rev. Timothy Johnson	Television film
2000	Martial Law	Dennis Taggart	Episode: "Final Conflict: Part 1"
2001	NYPD Blue	Phil Carlson	Episode: "Two Clarks in a Bar"
2005	JAG	Donald Pulone	Episode: "The Sixth Juror"
2005	NCIS	CDR Robert Morris	Episode: "Switch"
