= Perfect Game (2000 film) =

2000 American film

- Written by: Dan Guntzelman
- Directed by: Dan Guntzelman
- Starring: Edward Asner; Patrick Duffy; Cameron Finley; Tracy Nelson
- Composer: David Benoit
- Country of origin: United States
- Original language: English

Production
- Producer: James Sbardellati
- Cinematography: John Gunselman
- Editor: Dan Guntzelman
- Running time: 99 minutes
- Production company: Up to Bat Productions
- Budget: USD$100,000

Original release
- Network: Disney Channel
- Release: April 18, 2000

Perfect Game is a 2000 American made-for-television comedy film about an eleven-year-old boy who loves baseball and yearns to play on his local Little League team. It was produced for the Disney Channel, where it was first aired.

== Plot ==
Kanin Crosby, an 11-year-old boy who longs to play baseball for his local Little League team, is surprised when he and a group of other boys who, like him, are not all that talented, make the team. The team is led by experienced coach Bobby Geiser. The team soon finds out, however, that Geiser was obliged to take the less-than-stellar players on in order to win a bet, provoking anger in Kanin, his friends and his mother Diane.

With Diane's help, the team overthrow Geiser and he is replaced by Billy, a retired school baseball coach. The team soon find out, however, that their new coach requires just as much self-assurance as they do. Through this they discover the value of teamwork.

== Cast ==
- Edward Asner as Coach Billy
- Patrick Duffy as Coach Bobby Geiser Sr.
- Cameron Finley as Kanin 'Canine' Crosby
- Tracy Nelson as Diane Crosby
- Sam Anderson as Steven
- Evan Arnold as Ed Spangler
- Drake Bell as Bobby Geiser Jr.
- Mark Blankfield as Coach Ron
- Orlando Brown as Marcel Williams
- Joanna Daniels as Robin
- Bill Kirchenbauer as Coach Hank
- Paul Robert Langdon as Enrique
- Christopher Lee as Satoshi Miyake
- Bryan Matsuura as Osamu Miyati
- Hayley Palmer as Kelly
- Chelsea Parnell as Logan Crosby
- Sara Paxton as Sydney
- Martin Spanjers as Brian
- Jacqueline Steiger as Marsha
- Shelley Malil as Coach Ravi
- Christopher Naoki Lee as Satoshi Miyati
- Zachary Britton as a ballplayer

== See also ==
- List of baseball films
