= 13 (2010 film) =

2010 thriller film directed by Géla Babluani

- Theatrical release poster
- Directed by: Géla Babluani
- Written by: Géla Babluani; Gregory Pruss
- Based on: 13 Tzaméti by Géla Babluani
- Produced by: Rick Schwartz; Jeanette B. Milio; Valerio Morabito
- Starring: Sam Riley; Ray Winstone; Curtis "50 Cent" Jackson; Alexander Skarsgård; Mickey Rourke; Jason Statham
- Cinematography: Michael McDonough
- Edited by: Géla Babluani; David Gray
- Music by: Alexander Bubenheim
- Production companies: Magnet Media Group; Overnight Films; Barbarian Films; Morabito Picture Company
- Distributed by: Anchor Bay Films (United States and United Kingdom); Paramount Vantage (International)
- Release dates: March 13, 2010 (SXSW); October 28, 2011 (United States)
- Running time: 97 minutes
- Country: United States
- Language: English
- Box office: $3.7 million

13 is a 2010 American psychological crime thriller film directed by Géla Babluani (who also directed the original), stars Sam Riley, Ray Winstone, 50 Cent, Mickey Rourke and Jason Statham. It is a remake of the 2005 Georgian-French film 13 Tzameti.

== Plot ==
Vincent "Vince" Ferro overhears people talking about a dead man who was going to start a well-paid job. Ferro, in need of money, steals an envelope containing the instructions for the job. He arrives at an event in a secluded place. He is ordered to strip, and his boot heels are cut off, in order to check for surveillance equipment. The organizers accept him for the job instead of the dead man. The job is participation in a series of Russian roulette games. There are several participants, identified by number. In each round, the participants have to spin the cylinder of their revolver, and shoot when the light of a special light bulb is switched on. The event is organized for the enjoyment of rich spectators, one of these spectators being Jasper Bagges, who places bets on who will survive. Bagges bets on his brother Ronald, who was brought from the mental institution. One of the participants, Patrick Jefferson, who was brought out from prison by his patron Jimmy to compete, begs Jimmy to help him but is ignored. He then bargains with Jimmy about the hidden loot which he and his son robbed from a truck before going to prison. He requests Jimmy to give half of the loot to his imprisoned son and Jimmy can keep half of it if he dies in the game.

In the first round, the participants each get one bullet in their revolver, they are arranged into a circle, and each has to aim his revolver at the man in front of him. Ferro tries to back out, but he is forced to participate. As #13, he survives the first round and fires his gun only after being threatened with death. In the second round, in which two bullets are placed in each gun, Ferro survives only because the man behind him is killed before he could fire, as a bullet was in the chamber. In the third round, with three bullets in each gun, Ferro again survives, along with four other men. In the final round, Ferro is one of two survivors randomly chosen to participate in a duel. The three others are finished and get a large sum of money. Jimmy then tries to garrote Jefferson to steal the map of the loot to take all the money for himself. Another employee catches Jimmy in the act, and demands that he stop, insisting that nobody is allowed to harm the surviving players. Jefferson then reveals the supposed map to Jimmy which turns out to be blank paper and mock Jimmy for being fooled by him. As the angered Jimmy leaves, Jefferson collects his belongings and leaves but not before burning the paper, which turns out to be the hidden real map of his loot so no one can find it, as well as fooling Jimmy from pursuing him later on.

Against the odds, Ferro wins the duel and gets $1,850,000 (USD). He also learns that his opponent won his last 3 duels. He collects his winnings and sneaks away from the mansion, arriving at a train station. When he spots police closing in on him, he stashes his winnings in a garbage can. After being interrogated by the police, he retrieves the money and sends it to his family, via registered mail, and buys a toy for his sister's birthday. However, on the way home, he is shot by Bagges, partly in revenge for Ferro having killed Ronald, and partly to steal the money, as he thinks Ferro still has the money with him. Bagges escapes with the money bag, not knowing that it only contains the toy. Before dying, Ferro takes out the package receipt and swallows it so the authority and Bagges will not be able to trace the money.

== Cast ==
- Jason Statham as Jasper Bagges, a wealthy British man who bets on the competition and has a peculiar interest in one of the competitors.
- Sam Riley as Vincent "Vince" Ferro, a naive young man who stumbles into the competition.
- Ray Winstone as Ronald Lynn Bagges, a competitor who has been sprung from a mental institution to participate.
- Curtis "50 Cent" Jackson as Jimmy, an employee assigned to escort Rourke's character to the bloody game.
- Mickey Rourke as Patrick Jefferson (originally Jesse James Jefferson), a Texan Cowboy broken out of a Mexican jail and sold into the competition.
- David Zayas as Detective Mullane, a cop on the trail of the illegal game. Ray Liotta was originally cast. Zayas met with director Géla Babluani about a part but nothing came out of it. After Liotta dropped out, Babluani called Zayas back and offered him the role.
- Ronald Guttman as Joe Grubber
- Emmanuelle Chriqui as Aileen
- Michael Shannon as Henry
- Ben Gazzara as Schlondorff
- Alexander Skarsgård as Jack
- Gaby Hoffmann as Clara Ferro, Vincent's sister.
- Michael Berry Jr. as William
- Chuck Zito as Ted

The film features Mickey Rourke, Jason Statham and David Zayas, who all starred in The Expendables which was released before this film.

== Production ==
The film was directed and written by Géla Babluani, who directed and wrote the original film. A trailer was released in August 2010. Filming began on November 17, 2008, in and around New York City.

== Reception ==
13 received critically negative reviews. On Rotten Tomatoes, it has an 7% rating, stating that only 1 out of the 14 reviews for the film was positive, with an average score of 3.8/10.

The New York Times film critic Stephen Holden considered 13 "a blustering, bad cartoon." V.A. Musetto of the New York Post criticized the film for being shot in color rather than the original's black and white, and for the addition of character back stories, "which serve only to slow the film’s momentum." The Hollywood Reporter said "Géla Babluani's English-language remake of his French debut loses the source's gritty, mysterious gloom."
