= Housebound (2000 film) =

- Directed by: Mari Kornhauser
- Written by: Mari Kornhauser
- Produced by: Louis Nader
- Starring: Katharina Wressnig; Peter Sarsgaard
- Cinematography: Garrett Fisher
- Edited by: Kyle Curry; Walid J. Mouaness
- Music by: Mark Binder
- Production company: Rearview Mirror
- Release date: September 2, 2000 (Montreal)
- Running time: 89 minutes
- Country: United States
- Language: English

Housebound (also titled Kitchen Privileges) is a 2000 American thriller film written and directed by Mari Kornhauser and starring Katharina Wressnig and Peter Sarsgaard.

== Cast ==
- Katharina Wressnig as Marie
- Peter Sarsgaard as Tom
- Angeline Ball as Mignon
- Geoffrey Lower as Jarrid
- Liz Stauber as Ricky
- Ann Magnuson as Brandy

== Release ==
The film premiered at the Montreal World Film Festival on September 2, 2000.

== Reception ==
Eddie Cockrell of Variety gave the film a mixed review and wrote that "...Wressnig brings a fine Euro gravity to the updated Catherine Deneuve role, but viewers will be distracted by overly schematic and unconvincing production design."

Ron Wells of Film Threat gave it a positive review, praising Kornhauser "...for expressing some unfashionable compassion of a tale that demonstrates that two people, no matter how screwed up, can help each other if they open themselves up."
