= The Experiment (2010 film) =

American thriller film

- Theatrical release poster
- Directed by: Paul T. Scheuring
- Screenplay by: Paul T. Scheuring
- Based on: Das Experiment by Oliver Hirschbiegel; Mario Giordano; Christoph Darnstädt; Don Bohlinger
- Produced by: Marty Adelstein, Bill Johnson; Jeanette B. Milio; Maggie Monteith; Scott Nemes; Dawn Olmstead; Paul T. Scheuring
- Starring: Adrien Brody; Forest Whitaker; Cam Gigandet; Clifton Collins Jr. Fisher Stevens; Maggie Grace
- Cinematography: Amy Vincent
- Edited by: Peter S. Elliot
- Music by: Graeme Revell
- Production companies: Stage 6 Films; Alliance Cinema; Magnet Media; Mercator
- Distributed by: Sony Pictures Releasing (North America/Australia/New Zealand); Inferno Distribution (International)
- Release dates: July 15, 2010 (PiFan); September 21, 2010
- Running time: 96 minutes
- Country: United States
- Language: English
- Budget: $21.8 million

The Experiment is a 2010 American drama thriller film directed by Paul T. Scheuring and starring Adrien Brody, Forest Whitaker, Cam Gigandet, Clifton Collins Jr., and Maggie Grace, about an experiment which resembles Philip Zimbardo's Stanford prison experiment in 1971.

The film is a remake of the 2001 German film Das Experiment, which was directed by Oliver Hirschbiegel.

== Plot ==
Volunteers arrive for a psychological study led by Dr. Archaleta (Stevens), among them Travis (Brody), a proud anti-war protester, and Michael Barris (Whitaker), a 42-year-old man who still lives with his domineering mother.

After interviews measuring responses to scenes of violence, a chosen 26 are driven to an isolated prison setting with 24 hour camera coverage. The group is split into six guards and 20 prisoners, thereafter referred to only by number. Travis is assigned as a prisoner (#77), and Barris as a guard. Prisoners are required to fully consume three meals a day, participate in 30 minutes of daily recreation, remain within designated areas, and avoid speaking to guards unless spoken to first. Guards must ensure prisoners obey the rules and deal commensurately with transgressions within 30 minutes. Archaleta stresses that the experiment will end immediately at the first sign of violence or quitting. If all rules are followed for two weeks, each man will be compensated $14,000.

Travis' cellmates are Benjy, a graphic novelist, and Nix, a member of the Aryan Brotherhood who served prison time before. Barris, concerned that some guards may be capable of violence, tries to dissuade them from aggressive behavior. Instead, the guards grow more forceful to make prisoners 'obey at all costs'. Barris gradually becomes more sadistic. Realizing that the defiant Travis is influencing prisoner dissent, Barris instructs other guards to abduct him, shave his head, and urinate upon him. When Archaleta fails to intervene, Barris reasons that his actions were "commensurate". When fellow guard Bosch dissents, Barris pressures him to continue.

Travis discovers that Benjy, now severely ill, concealed his need for insulin, believing he could cure his diabetes merely through dieting. Bosche tries to help find Benjy's insulin, but is caught by other guards. Barris provides Benjy's insulin, but later has all the guards beat Bosche severely and orders Travis to clean the prison toilets. When Travis taunts Barris, the guards respond by shoving his head into the toilet, nearly drowning him.

One morning during roll call, Travis removes his shirt as a sign of protest, followed by the other prisoners. He climbs up to one of the cameras and demands they be released, but the guards choke him. When Benjy tries to defend Travis, Barris bludgeons him. Guards lock Travis into an old boiler pipe overnight, attack the remaining prisoners, and handcuff each man across the cell doors.

While locked in the boiler, Travis discovers a hidden infrared camera. As his despondency turns to anger, he manages to escape and interrupts a guard’s attempt to rape a prisoner. The intended victim and Travis beat the guard and knock him out before freeing the other prisoners. Finding Benjy dead from his head injury, Travis leads an assault against the guards, chasing them through the building. As the remaining guards try to lift the garage door to escape, Barris tries to keep them in, unwilling to forfeit his power. A vicious brawl ensues with the prisoners overwhelming the guards. Travis personally confronts Barris, who tries to stab him, only for Travis to stop the blade with his bare hand. Shocked by his own actions, Barris allows Travis to beat him to a pulp. Only then does the door open, signaling the end of the experiment.

The group emerges into bright sunlight and sits on the grass in silence until a bus arrives. Audio news snippets suggest that Archaleta is being tried for manslaughter in Benjy's death. Travis, having received his payment, travels to India to meet his girlfriend.

== Cast ==
- Adrien Brody as Travis
- Forest Whitaker as Michael Barris
- Cam Gigandet as Chase
- Clifton Collins Jr. as Nix
- Fisher Stevens as Dr. Archaleta
- Maggie Grace as Bay
- Ethan Cohn as Benjy
- Travis Fimmel as Helweg
- David Banner as Bosche
- Jason Lew as Oscar
- Damien Leake as Governor
