= Wildbach (TV series) =

- Starring: Siegfried Rauch
- Country of origin: Germany

Wildbach (German pronunciation: [ˈvɪltˌbax]) is a German television series.

== See also ==
- List of German television series
