= Steve Nave =

American actor

Steve Nave (died June 6, 2015) was an American actor and casting director. He appeared in over 50 feature films and 60 television shows. He played professional minor league baseball until age 22 when he started acting. In 1993 he founded Steve Nave Actor Showcase where he brought actors in for a performance workshop where actors network and perform for some of the top producers, casting directors, and directors in the industry. He died from cancer on June 6, 2015.
