= Logan O'Brien =

American actor

- Born: Logan Craig O'Brien; January 21, 1992 (age 34); Los Angeles, California, U.S.
- Occupations: Actor, singer
- Years active: 1997—2005
- Website: www.loganobrien.com

Logan Craig O'Brien (born January 21, 1992) is an American retired child actor and singer. O'Brien is best known for his role as Lucas Jones on General Hospital.

== Life and career ==
O'Brien was born in Los Angeles, California, to a doctor mother and a police sergeant father. He started his career at the age of six, after being cast in his first feature film role in the independent film Special Delivery, starring Sean Young, Penny Marshall and Nell Carter. He followed that up with co-starring roles in Disney's Smart House, and Hallmark Hall of Fame's A Season for Miracles, with Laura Dern and Lynn Redgrave. He also appeared in a duet entitled "Younger Generation" with singer Joey Pearson on his album Something to Say in 2002.

He has been involved in many theatrical productions, earning awards and nominations for his performances, and was seen in the ABC primetime pilot sitcom That Was Then. In 2005, O'Brien completed filming his part in the Universal Studios feature film Serenity, directed by Joss Whedon, which premiered worldwide September 30, 2005.

== Filmography ==
Film
| Year | Film | Role | Notes |
|---|---|---|---|
| 1999 | Special Delivery | Ben | |
| 2005 | Serenity | Boy Student | |
Television
| Year | Title | Role | Notes |
| 1997 | Mad About You | Logan | 1 episode |
| 1998 | NewsRadio | Charlie | Episode: "Look Who's Talking" |
| 1998 | Mr. Show | Alien Child | Episode: "Sad Songs are Nature's Onions |
| 1998–2002 | General Hospital | Lucas Stansbury Jones | Unknown episodes |
| 1999 | Smart House | Ben Age 6 | Television movie |
| 1999 | Hallmark Hall of Fame | Young Boy | Episode: A Season for Miracles |
| 2000 | Becker | Billy | 1 episode |
| 2000 | The Michael Richards Show | Trampoline child | Uncredited, 1 episode |
| 2001 | Malcolm in the Middle | Ronnie Demarco | Episode: "Malcolm's Girlfriend" |
| 2001–2002 | Primetime Glick | Ryan; Jordan | 2 episodes |
| 2002 | The Guardian | Matthew Damira | 1 episode |
| 2002 | That Was Then | Ethan Glass | 1 episode |

== Award nominations ==
| Year | Award | Result | Category | Film or series |
|---|---|---|---|---|
| 1999 | Young Artist Award | Nominated | Best Performance in a Day Time Serial – Young Performer | General Hospital |
| 2000 | Young Artist Award | Nominated | Best Performance in a Soap Opera – Young Actor | General Hospital |
| 2001 | Young Artist Award | Nominated | Best Performance in a Daytime TV Series – Young Actor | General Hospital |
| 2002 | Young Artist Award | Nominated | Best Performance in a TV Series (Comedy or Drama) – Young Actor Age Ten or Under | General Hospital |
| 1999 | YoungStar Award | Nominated | Best Performance by a Young Actor in a Daytime TV Program | General Hospital |
