= Julie Scardina =

American television presenter (born 1957)

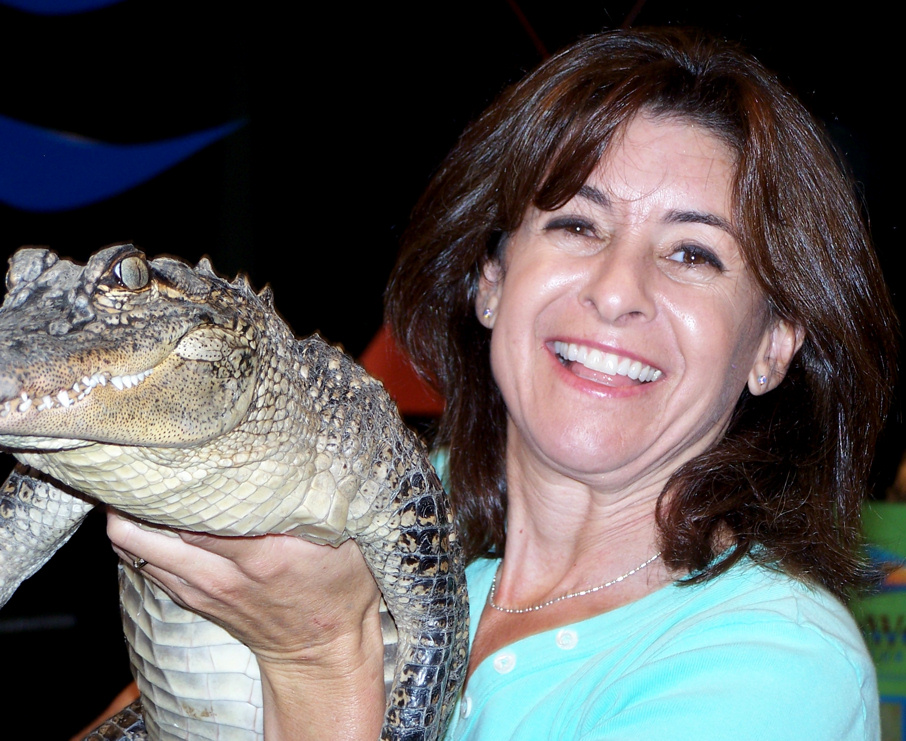
- Julie Scardina presents Bob the alligator along with a message promoting sustainability and conservation of our natural resources at the 2006 Texas Parks and Wildlife Expo.
- Born: July 10, 1957 (age 69); San Diego, California, U.S.
- Occupations: animal trainer, producer

Julie Scardina is an Animal Ambassador and Corporate Curator for SeaWorld, Busch Gardens, and Discovery Cove zoological parks. She was formerly curator of animal training for SeaWorld San Diego.

Scardina is a professional animal trainer and educator, who is perhaps best known for regular appearances on The Tonight Show with Jay Leno, (Note: 50 appearances as of the 15 May 2009 episode, as stated by Leno.) where she was introduced by Leno as the most frequent guest before he ended his reign. Scardina's segments focused on conservation information about species and what the public can do to help animals. Scardina also appears monthly on Today with animal information segments and formerly filmed weekly segments for Jack Hanna's Animal Adventures.

== Biography ==
In 1975, Scardina graduated from Agoura High School.

Scardina graduated from San Diego State University with a major in psychology and a minor in biology, after attending a program at Moorpark College in Exotic Animal Training and Management.

Scardina has worked for years with killer whales, as well as dolphins, sea lions, and many other animals at the SeaWorld and Busch Gardens parks.

Scardina has been a board member of the SeaWorld & Busch Gardens Conservation Fund, which supports conservation education, habitat protection, species research, and animal rescue and rehabilitation around the globe. She has traveled to many of these projects throughout the world and is also involved with many other conservation organizations and efforts, such as the Emerging Wildlife Conservation Leaders, where she serves on the board and acts as a mentor to up and coming environmental leaders.

Scardina is co-author, along with Jeff Flocken of the International Fund for Animal Welfare, of "Wildlife Heroes: 40 Leading Conservationists and the Animals They Are Committed to Saving" published by Running Press 2012. The book profiles species, conservation issues, and people who have dedicated their lives to making a difference.
