= Velaphi =

Velaphi is a Zulu surname. Notable people with the name include:

== Given name ==
- Velaphi Ndlovu (born 1948), South African politician
- Velaphi Ndlangamandla (born 1966), South African serial killer

== Surname ==
- Alford Velaphi (born 1999), Motswana footballer
- Tando Velaphi (born 1987), Australian footballer
