= Cameron Finley =

American child actor (born 1987)

- Born: August 30, 1987 (age 39); Garland, Texas, U.S.
- Occupations: Molecular biologist; former child actor
- Years active: 1993–2000

Cameron Finley (born August 30, 1987) is an American former child actor and molecular biologist. While receiving accolades for his work in Hope Floats, Baywatch, One True Love, and Perfect Game, he is most known for his role as Theodore 'Beaver' Cleaver in the 1997 film Leave It to Beaver based upon the television series by the same name.

== Background ==
Finley was born in Garland, Texas, the son of Lexa Iann (née Aulgur), a spiritual healer, and Charles David "Chuck" Finley, a software developer. He has two siblings, Taz and Stopher. When he was three, he was taken by his parents to an acting seminar near his home. He continued acting until the age of 13, at which time he chose to quit acting so he could go to school full-time and "be a normal kid".

Finley attended Moorpark High School. He graduated in 2010 from UC San Diego with a degree in molecular biology. He currently resides in Brooklyn, NY.

== Career ==
Finley starred in his first national commercial, for Shell Oil, when he was three years old and living with his family in the Dallas suburb of Garland, Texas. He also featured in commercials for such companies as Taco Bell, Shout, and Brink's Security. Finley acted in the films What's Eating Gilbert Grape, A Perfect World, 8 Seconds, and appeared as a guest on The Tonight Show with Jay Leno on three occasions. In 1997, after beating out more than 5,000 other boys in a nationwide search, Finley played the title character in the Leave It to Beaver film. He then appeared in Hope Floats as Travis, a sad child who dresses up as a dozen different characters ranging from Barney the Dinosaur to Charlie Chaplin. In 1995 Finley was one of the 3,000 actors that auditioned for the role of young Anakin Skywalker in Star Wars: Episode I – The Phantom Menace. Finley also starred in the 2000 direct-to-video Disney movie Perfect Game, in which he played Kanin, a boy driven by the ghost of his deceased father to show that he can play baseball as well as anyone on the championship Little League team.

Since leaving acting in 2000, Cameron graduated from high school and went to study at the University of California, San Diego. He has worked as a researcher in molecular biology, and has published a number of academic research articles in his field.

== Filmography ==
=== Film ===
Year	Title	Role	Notes
1993	What's Eating Gilbert Grape	Doug Carver	
1993	A Perfect World	Bob Fielder Jr.	
1994	8 Seconds	Young Lane Frost	
1995	Takedown		
1997	Leave It to Beaver	Theodore 'Beaver' Cleaver	
1998	Hope Floats	Travis	

=== Television ===
Year	Title	Role	Notes
1994	Heaven & Hell: North & South, Book III	Gus	TV miniseries
1995	A Woman of Independent Means	Drew #1	TV miniseries
1995	Coach	Angry Child	Episode: "Is It Hot in Here, or Is It Me?: Part 2"
1995	Walker, Texas Ranger	Little Phil / Zack Jamison	2 episodes
1995	Deadly Family Secreets	Timothy Pick	TV film
1996	Don't Look Back	Jeremy	TV film
1996	Touched by an Angel	Matt	Episode: "The Violin Lesson"
1998	The Lionhearts	Spencer Lionheart	Voice, main role
1998	Ghosts of Fear Street	Mickey	Television film
1998-99	Baywatch	Tanner Sloan	Recurring role
1999	Three Secrets	Spencer	TV film
1999	Streets of Laredo	Ben Parker	TV miniseries
2000	One True Love	Corey	TV film
2000	Perfect Game	Kanin 'Canine' Crosby	TV film
2000	Time Share	Max Weiland	TV film
2000	Static Shock	Second Boy	Voice, episode: "Child's Play"

== Recognition ==
=== Awards and nominations ===
- 1998, won Lone Star Film & Television Awards 'Rising Star Actor'
- 1998, The Hollywood Reporter YoungStar Awards nomination for 'Best Performance by a Young Actor in a Comedy Film' for Leave It to Beaver
- 1998, The Hollywood Reporter YoungStar Awards nomination for 'Best Performance by a Young Actor in a Comedy Film' for Hope Floats
- 1998, Young Artist Awards nomination for 'Best Performance in a Feature Film - Young Actor Age Ten or Under' for Leave It to Beaver
- 1999, Young Artist Awards nomination for 'Best Performance in a Feature Film - Young Actor Age Ten or Under' for Hope Floats
- 2000, Young Artist Awards nomination for 'Best Performance in a TV Drama Series - Supporting Young Actor' for Baywatch
- 2001, Young Artist Awards nomination for 'Best Performance in a TV Movie (Drama) - Supporting Young Actor' for One True Love
- 2001, Won 'Best Child Actor' at International Family Film Festival (formerly Santa Clarita International Film Festival) for Perfect Game
