= List of The Tonight Show with Jay Leno episodes (2012) =

- No. of episodes: 205

Release
- Original network: NBC

Season chronology
- ← Previous; 2011 episodes Next → 2013–14 episodes

This is a list of episodes for The Tonight Show with Jay Leno that aired in 2012.

== 2012 ==
=== January ===
| No. | Original release date | Guest(s) | Musical/entertainment guest(s) |
|---|---|---|---|
| 4,174 | January 3, 2012 | Whitney Cummings, Nicole "Snooki" Polizzi | will.i.am |
Headlines
| 4,175 | January 4, 2012 | Tracy Morgan, Rick & Corey Harrison | Shaggy |
Mind Over Matter, Does This Thrill Bill?
| 4,176 | January 5, 2012 | Michelle Williams, Josh Lucas | Chris Cornell |
Police Blotter
| 4,177 | January 6, 2012 | Glenn Close, Trevor Noah | Van Hunt |
John McCain Senior Moment, Juicy Busey Bite, Products For A Better You
| 4,178 | January 9, 2012 | Janet Jackson, Larry the Cable Guy | Eli Young Band |
Getting To Know The Lesser-Known Candidates, Big Head, Tiny Hat, Jack Taylor Talks About The President
| 4,179 | January 10, 2012 | Queen Latifah, DJ Pauly D | Augustana |
How Long Does It Take To Catch A Politician In A Lie?, Pumpcasting
| 4,180 | January 11, 2012 | Liam Neeson, Meghan McCain | Jack's Mannequin |
Similar... yet Completely Different, Headlines
| 4,181 | January 12, 2012 | Gerard Butler, Betty White | Ledisi |
The Road To The Olympics, Ask Jay Anything
| 4,182 | January 13, 2012 | Tilda Swinton, Jennifer Hudson | Graffiti6 |
What's This Guy Taking A Picture Of?, An Unfortunate Choice Of Words, Mamas, Don't Let Your Daughters Grow Up To Be Cowgirls, Jaywalking: "Lights, Camera... Pop Quiz!"
| 4,183 | January 17, 2012 | Sam Worthington, Sherri Shepherd | Adam Lambert |
Headlines
| 4,184 | January 18, 2012 | Jennifer Garner, Ross Mathews | Parachute |
Jay And Jim Norton Answer Audience Questions
| 4,185 | January 19, 2012 | Wanda Sykes, Mark Cuban | David Nail |
Stuff We Found On eBay
| 4,186 | January 20, 2012 | Randy Jackson, Ryan Seacrest & Steven Tyler, Sarah Colonna | Joe Perry & Steven Tyler with special guest Randy Jackson |
Off The Wall
| 4,187 | January 30, 2012 | Madonna, Chris Colfer | Joe Perry |
Things You'll Never Hear, Woulda Coulda Shoulda
| 4,188 | January 31, 2012 | Michelle Obama, Mark Harmon | Imelda May |
Headlines

=== February ===
| No. | Original release date | Guest(s) | Musical/entertainment guest(s) |
|---|---|---|---|
| 4,189 | February 1, 2012 | Daniel Radcliffe, Vanessa Hudgens | Evanescence |
Hidden Messages In Famous Logos, Death Of An Expression
| 4,190 | February 2, 2012 | Drew Barrymore, Blake Shelton | Blake Shelton |
Mid-Season TV Shows
| 4,191 | February 3, 2012 | Debra Messing, Jean Dujardin | Bush |
Real Food For Fat-Ass Americans Or Something Disgusting We Made Up?: Super Bowl Edition, Jaywalking: Good Neighbor Jay
| 4,192 | February 6, 2012 | Dwayne Johnson, Miranda Cosgrove | Ovo (Cirque du Soleil) |
What's Mitt Romney Doing Right Now?, Headlines
| 4,193 | February 7, 2012 | Chelsea Handler, Governor Jon Huntsman | 2Cellos |
Howie Mandel Holds Audition For Mobbed, Ridiculous 991 Calls
| 4,194 | February 8, 2012 | Chris Pine, Lisa Lampanelli | Anthony Hamilton |
What's Larry King Doing Today?, You Can't Oustsource Rock 'n Roll, Mall Psychics
| 4,195 | February 9, 2012 | Denzel Washington, Octavia Spencer | Estelle |
Valentine's Day Gift Ideas
| 4,196 | February 10, 2012 | Rachel McAdams, CeeLo Green | CeeLo Green & Vicci Martinez |
Video Metaphor For Mitt Romney's Presidential Campaign, Jaywalking: You Be The Nominee: Grammy Edition
| 4,197 | February 13, 2012 | Jennifer Lopez, Jeff Dunham | The Civil Wars |
Jim Norton At The Grammys
| 4,198 | February 14, 2012 | Tyler Perry, Dorothy Custer | The Cranberries |
Adam The Page's Valentine's Challenge
| 4,199 | February 15, 2012 | Bill Maher, Ali Wentworth | Punch Brothers |
Headlines
| 4,200 | February 16, 2012 | Amanda Seyfried, Billy Gardell | Monica and Brandy |
Video Metaphor For The Political Landscape, Meal Or No Meal
| 4,201 | February 17, 2012 | Animals with Dave Salmoni, Timothy Olyphant | The Fray |
Kiss-Ass Candidate Of The Night, Mister Inappropriate, Photo Booth
| 4,202 | February 20, 2012 | Taylor Swift, Michael Clark Duncan | Los Lobos, Robert Randolph and Chris Layton |
Headlines
| 4,203 | February 21, 2012 | Bill O'Reilly, Rob Riggle | Rumer |
The Road To The Olympics, Copy Cats
| 4,204 | February 22, 2012 | Tim Allen, Rocket City Rednecks | Jessie Baylin |
Missing The Real Story, Trevor Moore Tests New Products
| 4,205 | February 23, 2012 | Meredith Vieira, Jackson Murphy | Redlight King |
Police Blotter
| 4,206 | February 24, 2012 | Jennifer Aniston, Adam Levine | Chiddy Bang |
Regular Guy Or Rich Guy?, Battle Of The Jaywalk All-Stars with America's Next Top Model
| 4,207 | February 27, 2012 | Megan Fox, Michel Hazanavicius | Mariachi El Bronx |
Rove McManus Inside The Elton John Oscar Party
| 4,208 | February 28, 2012 | Khloé Kardashian Odom, Rob Schneider | Mona |
Would Your Hair Look Better As A Beard?, Headlines
| 4,209 | February 29, 2012 | Senator John McCain, Elizabeth Olsen | Romeo Santos |
Matt Kenseth Talks About Gas, Your Local News: Uh-Oh Edition, Products That Should Never Merge

=== March ===
| No. | Original release date | Guest(s) | Musical/entertainment guest(s) |
|---|---|---|---|
| 4,210 | March 1, 2012 | Julianne Moore, Dr. Brady Barr | Chickenfoot |
Sometimes God Wants The Other Team To Win, Facebook Friends
| 4,211 | March 2, 2012 | Emily Blunt, Geoff Stults | Scars on 45 |
Jaywalking: The Eyes Have It
| 4,212 | March 12, 2012 | Jessica Simpson, Adam Carolla | SOJA |
Kiss-Ass Candidate Of The Night, Your Local News: Watch Where You're Going Edition, Headlines
| 4,213 | March 13, 2012 | Jonah Hill, Bethenny Frankel | Shooter Jennings |
Them Vs. Us, Woulda Coulda Shoulda
| 4,214 | March 14, 2012 | Channing Tatum, Drew Brees | Meat Loaf |
Video Metaphor For The 2012 Presidential Campaign, Ease Up On The Caffeine, A 99 Cent Shopping Spree
| 4,215 | March 15, 2012 | Kiefer Sutherland, Kathryn Hahn | Andy Grammer |
The Difference Between Moms & Dads, Ask Jay Anything
| 4,216 | March 16, 2012 | Jimmy Fallon, H. L. McCullough | Toby Keith |
Just Ask The Mayans, Wheels Of Randomness, Jaywalk Tour Of American Politics
| 4,217 | March 19, 2012 | Jamie Lee Curtis, Armie Hammer | Robert Glasper Experiment featuring Ledisi |
Headlines
| 4,218 | March 20, 2012 | Ron Paul, Frank Caliendo | The Wanted |
How Long Does It Take For A Politician To Flip-Flop?, The Difference Between Moms & Dads, Stuff We Found On eBay
| 4,219 | March 21, 2012 | Kim Kardashian, Sherri Shepherd | Tennis |
What's Trending Tomorrow
| 4,220 | March 22, 2012 | Arsenio Hall, Lily Collins | The Secret Sisters |
Spring Break Around The States, The Gas Game
| 4,221 | March 23, 2012 | Christina Aguilera, Kevin Smith | Melanie Fiona featuring J. Cole |
Spring Break Around The States, Mikey Day & Trevor Moore Play Truth Or Dare
| 4,222 | March 26, 2012 | Elizabeth Banks, Carson Daly | Jake Owen |
Headlines
| 4,223 | March 27, 2012 | Mitt Romney, Megan Hilty | The Pierces |
Jaywalking: Good Neighbor Jay
| 4,224 | March 28, 2012 | Rainn Wilson, Debbie Gibson | Gavin DeGraw |
Jay Checks Out New Apps
| 4,225 | March 29, 2012 | Piers Morgan, Liam Hemsworth | Mat Kearney |
Spring Break Around The States, Magic Clerk
| 4,226 | March 30, 2012 | Nicole Richie, Will Sasso | Alan Jackson |
April Fools Pranks, American Idol Finalists

=== April ===
| No. | Original release date | Guest(s) | Musical/entertainment guest(s) |
|---|---|---|---|
| 4,227 | April 2, 2012 | Betty White, DJ Pauly D | Eric Huthinson |
The Road To The Olympics, Headlines
| 4,228 | April 3, 2012 | Maya Rudolph, Jason Biggs | Gym Class Heroes featuring Ryan Tedder |
Meal Or No Meal
| 4,229 | April 4, 2012 | David Gregory, CeeLo Green | Seal |
Video Metaphor For Obamacare In The Supreme Court, Poetry Month With Adam The Page
| 4,230 | April 5, 2012 | Zac Efron, Jennie Garth | Grace Potter & The Nocturnals |
The Difference Between Moms & Dads, Jay Checks Out The Latest Product Warnings
| 4,231 | April 6, 2012 | Kristin Chenoweth, Animals with Julie Scardina | Rodrigo y Gabriela and C.U.B.A. |
DeAndre Brackensick performs with the band, Jaywalking: Good Dancer Bad Dancer
| 4,232 | April 9, 2012 | Jane Lynch, Kevin Hart | Esperanza Spalding |
Headlines
| 4,233 | April 10, 2012 | Josh Hutcherson, Rachel Maddow | Eric Turner featuring Tinie Tempah & Lupe Fiasco |
Wheels Of Randomness
| 4,234 | April 11, 2012 | Albert Brooks, Corey Harrison & Chumlee | Neon Trees |
The Road To The Olympics, New Pet Products
| 4,235 | April 12, 2012 | Tim Allen, Chris Diamantopoulos | Feist |
Ask Jay Anything
| 4,236 | April 13, 2012 | Jason Segel, Anna Faris | Far East Movement |
Bet You Didn't See That Coming, Police Blotter
| 4,237 | April 23, 2012 | Jesse Tyler Ferguson, Aubrey O'Day | Train |
Video Metaphor For The Problems At NBC, Headlines
| 4,238 | April 24, 2012 | Jack Black, New York City's Meatball Shop Guys | Beirut |
Jaywalking: What's The Phrase?
| 4,239 | April 25, 2012 | Adam Levine, Richard Engel | Ziggy Marley |
Mister Inappropriate, Value Meal Or Last Meal, Hidden Messages In Famous Logos
| 4,240 | April 26, 2012 | Diane Keaton, Natalie Coughlin | Moby |
Mister Inappropriate, Ridiculous 911 Calls
| 4,241 | April 27, 2012 | Mel Gibson, Jeremy Minnier | The Wanted |
Colton Dixon & Elise Testone perform with the band, Photo Booth
| 4,242 | April 30, 2012 | Steve Martin, Mario Joyner | Steve Martin & The Steep Canyon Rangers |
Headlines

=== May ===
| No. | Original release date | Guest(s) | Musical/entertainment guest(s) |
|---|---|---|---|
| 4,243 | May 1, 2012 | Cameron Diaz, William Shatner | Lee Brice |
Grandmothers Then & Now, Trevor Moore Tests New Products
| 4,244 | May 2, 2012 | Scarlett Johansson, Blake Shelton | K'Naan |
Woulda Coulda Shoulda
| 4,245 | May 3, 2012 | Robert Downey Jr., Katharine McPhee | Art for Amnesty Band featuring Kris Kristofferson and Jonny Lang |
Stuff We Found On eBay
| 4,246 | May 4, 2012 | Kristen Stewart, Randy Jackson | James Morrison |
Skylar Laine performs with the band, Cinco De Leno
| 4,247 | May 7, 2012 | Michelle Pfeiffer, Bear Grylls | Snow Patrol |
Just Ask The Mayans, Headlines
| 4,248 | May 8, 2012 | Rick Santorum, Taylor Kitsch | B.o.B and O.A.R. |
Battle Of The YouTube All-Stars
| 4,249 | May 9, 2012 | Garry Shandling, Alison Brie | Jermaine Paul |
Copy Cats
| 4,250 | May 10, 2012 | Howie Mandel, Vinny Guadagnino | Sara Watkins |
What Moms Want Vs. What Moms Get, Gratuitous Butt Shot Of The Day, Off The Wall
| 4,251 | May 11, 2012 | Jenna Fischer, Jay Mohr | Katherine Jenkins |
Hollie Cavanagh performs with the band, Gift Ideas For Mother's Day
| 4,252 | May 14, 2012 | Kourtney, Kim & Khloé Kardashian, Donny Deutsch | Karmin |
Headlines
| 4,253 | May 15, 2012 | Wanda Sykes, Andy Cohen | Carlos Santana |
The Difference Between Moms & Dads, Jaywalking: Good Singer Bad Singer
| 4,254 | May 16, 2012 | Joel McHale, Jarod Miller | Bobby Brown |
You Make The Call, What's Trending Tomorrow
| 4,255 | May 17, 2012 | Hugh Laurie, Robert Griffin III | Hugh Laurie |
Mitt Romney Prank Of The Day, Jim Norton At The Renaissance Pleasure Faire
| 4,256 | May 18, 2012 | Sherri Shepherd, Julianne Hough | Tenacious D |
Video Metaphor For Wall Street Reform, Mitt Romney Prank Of The Day, The Road To The Olympics, The Difference Between Moms & Dads, Bet You Didn't See That Coming, Magic Clerk
| 4,257 | May 21, 2012 | Kevin Costner, Bailee Madison | Lisa Marie Presley |
Headlines
| 4,258 | May 22, 2012 | Josh Brolin, Ali Wentworth | Glenn Frey |
Mitt Romney Prank Of The Day, Arsenio Hall Talks About How Broke California Is, Ask Jay Anything
| 4,259 | May 23, 2012 | Charlize Theron, Jeffrey Dean Morgan | Juanes |
Jay Gives A Commencement Address
| 4,260 | May 24, 2012 | Glenn Close, Phillip Phillips | Nelly Furtado |
Pumpcasting
| 4,261 | May 25, 2012 | Colin Powell, Greg Gadson | The All-American Rejects |
Jaywalking: Oakwood's Blockbusters!

=== June ===
| No. | Original release date | Guest(s) | Musical/entertainment guest(s) |
|---|---|---|---|
| 4,262 | June 4, 2012 | Martin Short, Aubrey Plaza | Def Leppard |
Headlines
| 4,263 | June 5, 2012 | Emma Stone, Chris Hemsworth | Chris Robinson Brotherhood |
A 99 Cent Shopping Spree
| 4,264 | June 6, 2012 | Julia Louis-Dreyfus, Brian Banks | The Beach Boys |
Rove McManus Trains With Olympic Athletes
| 4,265 | June 7, 2012 | Catherine Zeta-Jones, Louis Zemperini | Bret Michaels |
Jaywalking: Remembering The Romance
| 4,266 | June 8, 2012 | Tom Cruise, Felix Baumgartner & Joe Kittinger | Kool & the Gang |
Police Blotter
| 4,267 | June 11, 2012 | Elizabeth Banks, Dan Patrick | Brandi Carlile |
Headlines
| 4,268 | June 12, 2012 | Larry Hagman, Linda Gray, Patrick Duffy, Meghan McCain, Dustin Brown | Meiko |
Jaywalking: Jaywalk News
| 4,269 | June 13, 2012 | Terry Bradshaw, Ernie Brown, Jr. and his sidekick Neal James | Rachel Bradshaw and her dad Terry |
Jay Checks Out New Apps
| 4,270 | June 14, 2012 | Penélope Cruz, Rick Harrison | We Are Augustines |
Gift Ideas For Father's Day
| 4,271 | June 15, 2012 | Salma Hayek, Adam Brody | Olly Murs |
Meal Or No Meal
| 4,272 | June 18, 2012 | Steve Carell, Cory Booker | Glen Hansard |
Headlines
| 4,273 | June 19, 2012 | Matthew McConaughey, Natasha Leggero | Grouplove |
Video Metaphor For The Government's Attempt To Kickstart The Economy, The Road To The Olympics, Trevor Moore's Negative Campaign Ads
| 4,274 | June 20, 2012 | Andy Samberg, Seth MacFarlane | Joe Henry featuring Lisa Hannigan |
The Difference Between Moms & Dads, New Summer Products
| 4,275 | June 21, 2012 | Katy Perry, Michael Wigge | Needtobreathe |
Birth Of An Expression, Death Of An Expression, Off The Wall
| 4,276 | June 22, 2012 | Chris Pine, Rachael Ray | Everclear |
Value Meal Or Last Meal, Do You Think This Marriage Will Last?, Woulda Coulda Shoulda
| 4,277 | June 25, 2012 | Louis C.K., Lolo Jones | Delta Rae |
Headlines
| 4,278 | June 26, 2012 | Matt LeBlanc, Sig Hansen & Keith Colburn | Robin Thicke |
What's Trending Tomorrow
| 4,279 | June 27, 2012 | Mila Kunis, Jim Norton | Justin Bieber |
If Charlie Sheen Were President, Jaywalking: Iconic Green Screen
| 4,280 | June 28, 2012 | Tyler Perry, Rhys Ifans | Keane |
Stuff We Found On eBay
| 4,281 | June 29, 2012 | Andrew Garfield, Quvenzhane Wallis | Of Monsters and Men |
America's Best Everyday American Who's Got Talent That We Idolize In America!

=== July ===
| No. | Original release date | Guest(s) | Musical/entertainment guest(s) |
|---|---|---|---|
| 4,282 | July 9, 2012 | Wanda Sykes, Rob Riggle | Kimbra |
Real Food For Fat-Ass Americans Or Something Disgusting We Made Up?, Mister Inappropriate, Headlines
| 4,283 | July 10, 2012 | Zachary Levi, Bubba Watson | B.o.B |
Pumpcasting
| 4,284 | July 11, 2012 | Morgan Freeman, Ashleigh and Pudsey | Jana Kramer |
Bet You Didn't See That Coming, New Summer TV Shows
| 4,285 | July 12, 2012 | Denis Leary, Olivia Munn | Kenny Chesney |
Jaywalking: Summer Vacation Destinations
| 4,286 | July 13, 2012 | Dana Carvey, Nicki Minaj | Nicki Minaj |
USA Vs. The World
| 4,287 | July 16, 2012 | Charlie Sheen, Jay Mohr | Imagine Dragons |
Headlines
| 4,288 | July 17, 2012 | Kate Beckinsale, Adam Carolla | Lionel Richie with The Madden Brothers |
The Road To The Olympics, Photo Booth
| 4,289 | July 18, 2012 | Newt Gingrich, Nicole "Snooki" Polizzi | MGK featuring Ester Dean |
New Warning Labels
| 4,290 | July 19, 2012 | Rachel Weisz, Aaron Paul | Robert Francis |
Are Women Smarter Than Men?, Video Metaphor For The Financial Crisis In Europe, Does This Thrill Bill?
| 4,291 | July 20, 2012 | Ben Stiller, Rose Byrne | Missy Higgins |
Perception Vs. Reality, The Road To The Olympics, Trevor Moore & Mikey Day Play Dare
| 4,292 | July 23, 2012 | Vince Vaughn, Travis Pastrana | Aretha Franklin |
Real Food For Fat-Ass Americans Or Something Disgusting We Made Up?, Headlines
| 4,293 | July 24, 2012 | Animals with Julie Scardina, Jenni "JWoww" Farley | Jay Sean |
Real Olympic Uniform Or Fast Food Outfit?, The Road To The Olympics, Ask Jay Anything
| 4,294 | July 25, 2012 | Jessica Biel, Kevin Smith | The Lumineers |
It Looks Dirty But It's Not, Olympic Athlete Meal Or Last Meal?, Police Blotter
| 4,295 | July 26, 2012 | Colin Farrell, Dwyane Wade | MoZella |
Jay Meets The Ninja Twins
| 4,296 | July 27, 2012 | Jeremy Renner, Betty White | Joss Stone |
Olympic Country Or Bone Loss Medicine?, The Road To The Olympics, Real Olympic Products

=== August ===
| No. | Original release date | Guest(s) | Musical/entertainment guest(s) |
|---|---|---|---|
| 4,297 | August 13, 2012 | Michelle Obama, Gabrielle Douglas | Norah Jones |
Headlines
| 4,298 | August 14, 2012 | Kelsey Grammer, Jordan Burroughs | Ryan Star |
Is His Head Bigger Than Mine?: Olympic Edition, Love Advice With Jay And Jim Norton
| 4,299 | August 15, 2012 | Sylvester Stallone, Missy Franklin | Dwight Yoakam |
Mars Or Barstow?, Wheels Of Randomness
| 4,300 | August 16, 2012 | Ryan Lochte, Kristen Bell | Regina Spektor |
Products That Should Never Merge
| 4,301 | August 17, 2012 | Jason Statham, Allyson Felix, Tom Green | The Offspring |
Bad Hair On Cable: Olympic Edition, Just Ask The Mayans, Jaywalking: TV Opens At The Oakwoods
| 4,302 | August 20, 2012 | Maya Rudolph, Jeff Foxworthy | Morning Parade |
Headlines
| 4,303 | August 21, 2012 | Shia LaBeouf, Jean-Claude Van Damme | fun. |
Hidden Messages In Famous Logos
| 4,304 | August 22, 2012 | Katie Couric, Dax Shepard | Emeli Sandé |
Hey! What Are You Doing There?, Back To School Products From The 99 Cent Store
| 4,305 | August 23, 2012 | Kirsten Dunst, Chris Matthews | The Smashing Pumpkins |
Meal Or No Meal
| 4,306 | August 24, 2012 | Howie Mandel, Lizzy Caplan | Alejandro Escovedo |
Fun With Fake Surveys
| 4,307 | August 27, 2012 | Dennis Miller, Kate Flannery | Joshua Radin |
Headlines
| 4,308 | August 28, 2012 | Lisa Kudrow, Richard Rawlings and Aaron Kaufman | Owl City and Carly Rae Jepsen |
How Many Kicks Does It Take To Open A Door?, Pitch To America
| 4,309 | August 29, 2012 | Bill Maher, Adam Hunter | Tristan Prettyman |
Woulda Coulda Shoulda
| 4,310 | August 30, 2012 | Savannah Guthrie, Dolph Lundgren | Hoobastank |
Which Woman Should Fire Her Hairstylist?, Off The Wall
| 4,311 | August 31, 2012 | Lauren Graham, Dan Patrick | The Dunwells |
RNC Freudian Slip Of The Night, Battle Of The Jaywalk All-Stars

=== September ===
| No. | Original release date | Guest(s) | Musical/entertainment guest(s) |
|---|---|---|---|
| 4,312 | September 4, 2012 | Ron Paul, Kevin Hart | The Robert Cray Band |
Headlines
| 4,313 | September 5, 2012 | Adam Levine, Magic Johnson | Grace Potter |
Jaywalking - You Be The Nominee: VMA Edition
| 4,314 | September 6, 2012 | Ellen DeGeneres, Josh Lucas | Billy Ray Cyrus |
Real Food For Fat-Ass Americans Or Something Disgusting We Made Up?, Future NFL Replacement Ref?, What's Trending Tomorrow
| 4,315 | September 7, 2012 | Matthew Perry, Meghan McCain | OneRepublic |
Jaywalking: Republican Or Democrat
| 4,316 | September 17, 2012 | Richard Gere, Anthony Robles | Rascal Flatts |
Future NFL Replacement Ref?, Headlines
| 4,317 | September 18, 2012 | Justin Timberlake, Steve Nash | Ryan Bingham |
Future NFL Replacement Ref?, Ridiculous 911 Calls
| 4,318 | September 19, 2012 | Amy Poehler, Joe Scarborough | Big and Rich |
Where Did Amanda Bynes Park Today?, Back To School Products
| 4,319 | September 20, 2012 | Viola Davis, Paul Wesley | Bonnie Raitt |
Photo Booth
| 4,320 | September 21, 2012 | Zooey Deschanel, Anthony Anderson | ZZ Top |
Bad Driver Challenge, America's Best American
| 4,321 | September 24, 2012 | David Spade, Giancarlo Esposito | Rebecca Ferguson |
Headlines
| 4,322 | September 25, 2012 | Ann Romney, Seth MacFarlane | Bettye LaVette |
Mister Inappropriate: SeaWorld Edition, Trevor Moore Tests New Products
| 4,323 | September 26, 2012 | Kirstie Alley, Mike "The Situation" Sorrentino | Richie Sambora |
After The Tweet, New Fall TV Shows
| 4,324 | September 27, 2012 | Liam Neeson, Lisa Lampanelli | The Gaslight Anthem |
USA Vs. The World
| 4,325 | September 28, 2012 | Christina Aguilera, Sherri Shepherd | The Piano Guys |
Jaywalking: Jaywalk News

=== October ===
| No. | Original release date | Guest(s) | Musical/entertainment guest(s) |
|---|---|---|---|
| 4,326 | October 1, 2012 | Bryan Cranston, Rebel Wilson | Cher Lloyd |
Headlines
| 4,327 | October 2, 2012 | Carol Burnett, Armie Hammer | Lang Lang and Friends |
Stuff We Found On eBay
| 4,328 | October 3, 2012 | Christina Applegate, Apolo Anton Ohno | A Fine Frenzy |
Ask Jay Anything
| 4,329 | October 4, 2012 | Ben Affleck, Octavia Spencer | Neon Trees |
Survey Says
| 4,330 | October 5, 2012 | Colin Farrell, Dakota Meyer | The Hives |
Police Blotter
| 4,331 | October 8, 2012 | Arnold Schwarzenegger, Bubba Watson | The Wallflowers |
Headlines
| 4,332 | October 9, 2012 | Tyler Perry, Oscar Pistorius | Plain White T's |
What's Trending Tomorrow
| 4,333 | October 10, 2012 | Chelsea Handler, Plácido Domingo | Plácido Domingo |
Does This Thrill Bill?
| 4,334 | October 11, 2012 | Terry Bradshaw, Captain Mark Kelly | Grizzly Bear |
It's Better In Spanish, Off The Wall
| 4,335 | October 12, 2012 | Miley Cyrus, Rove McManus | The Script |
Is Her Head Bigger Than Mine?, Fake Spokesperson Auditions
| 4,336 | October 22, 2012 | Halle Berry, Ali Wentworth | Gary Clark, Jr. |
The Difference Between Moms & Dads, Headlines
| 4,337 | October 23, 2012 | Denzel Washington, Richard Engel | The Wombats |
The Debate's Most Awkward Photo Of The Night, Pumpcasting
| 4,338 | October 24, 2012 | President Barack Obama | No Doubt |
| 4,339 | October 25, 2012 | Russell Brand, Jane Lynch | Mika |
Scary Halloween Products
| 4,340 | October 26, 2012 | Sarah Silverman, Paula Deen | Lyle Lovett |
Woulda Coulda Shoulda
| 4,341 | October 29, 2012 | Simon Cowell & Britney Spears, Billy Gardell | Two Door Cinema Club |
Headlines
| 4,342 | October 30, 2012 | John C. Reilly, Jenni "JWoww" Farley | Lifehouse |
Jaywalking: TV Opens At The Oakwoods
| 4,343 | October 31, 2012 | Taylor Lautner, Lior Suchard | Macy Gray |
Kid Metaphors

=== November ===
| No. | Original release date | Guest(s) | Musical/entertainment guest(s) |
|---|---|---|---|
| 4,344 | November 1, 2012 | Jamie Lee Curtis, Sergio Romo & Barry Zito | ZZ Ward |
Copy Cats
| 4,345 | November 2, 2012 | Marion Cotillard, Olate Dogs | Third Day |
Adam The Page's Election Games
| 4,346 | November 5, 2012 | Kristen Stewart, Dax Shepard | Kip Moore |
Election 2012: A Look Back, Headlines
| 4,347 | November 7, 2012 | Daniel Craig, Animals with Dave Salmoni | Diamond Rings |
Photo Booth
| 4,348 | November 8, 2012 | Sally Field, Michael Kosta | Lord Huron |
This Ain't Gonna Help His Street Cred, Ridiculous 911 Calls
| 4,349 | November 9, 2012 | Meredith Vieira & Richard Cohen, James Spader | Christina Perri |
Excellence In Broadcasting: Political Edition, Jaywalking: Jaywalk Food Phrases
| 4,350 | November 12, 2012 | Lea Michele, Nev Schulnan | Toby Keith |
Headlines
| 4,351 | November 13, 2012 | Keira Knightley, Whitney Cummings | Gin Wigmore |
Telegraph Or Tweet?, Meal Or No Meal
| 4,352 | November 14, 2012 | Helen Hunt, DJ Pauly D | Kylie Minogue |
A teenager explains the David Petraeus extramaritial affair, Magic Clerk
| 4,353 | November 15, 2012 | Tim Allen, Nolan Gould | Switchfoot |
New Warning Labels
| 4,354 | November 16, 2012 | Chris Matthews, Keegan-Michael Key & Jordan Peele | The Mowgli's |
Jaywalking: You Be The Nominee: AMA Edition
| 4,355 | November 19, 2012 | Jennifer Lawrence, Phil & Willie Robertson | Andy Grammer |
Headlines
| 4,356 | November 20, 2012 | Lindsay Lohan, David Gregory | Wanda Jackson |
Ask Jay Anything
| 4,357 | November 21, 2012 | Joseph Gordon-Levitt, Kris Jenner | Dan Cummins |
Old Geezer Or Turkey?, Battle Of The Jaywalk All-Stars with America's Next Top Model
| 4,358 | November 22, 2012 | Bradley Cooper, Natasha Leggero | PSY |
Old Geezer Or Turkey?, You Can't Outsource Rock 'n Roll, Why Our Military Is The Best In The World, Trevor Moore & Mikey Day Play Dare
| 4,359 | November 26, 2012 | Jim Parsons, Maggie Elizabeth Jones | Delta Rae |
It's The Most Wonderful Time Of The Year!, Your Local News: French-Canadian Edition, Countdown To Puberty, Headlines
| 4,360 | November 27, 2012 | Julie Bowen, Rocket City Rednecks | Milo Greene |
Old Geezer Or Turkey?, He's No Rocket Scientist!, It Looks Dirty, But It's Not, Pumpcasting
| 4,361 | November 28, 2012 | Wanda Sykes, Blake Shelton | Blake Shelton |
Mister Inappropriate: Holiday Edition, Fake Spokesperson Auditions
| 4,362 | November 29, 2012 | Newt Gingrich, Ron Shirley | Grouplove |
It's The Most Wonderful Time Of The Year!, What's Trending Tomorrow
| 4,363 | November 30, 2012 | Marisa Tomei, Carson Daly | Il Volo |
The Reason Cats Have Nine Lives: Holiday Edition, The Difference Between Men And Women, Police Blotter

=== December ===
| No. | Original release date | Guest(s) | Musical/entertainment guest(s) |
|---|---|---|---|
| 4,364 | December 3, 2012 | Gerard Butler, Olivia Munn | The Polyphonic Spree |
It's The Most Wonderful Time Of The Year!, Headlines
| 4,365 | December 4, 2012 | Khloé Kardashian Odom, Adam Carolla | Matisyahu |
It's The Most Wonderful Time Of The Year!, You Know What Would Be Funny?, Christmas At The 99 Cent Store
| 4,366 | December 5, 2012 | Don Johnson, Animals with Julie Scardina | Darius Rucker |
Old Geezer Or Turkey?, Jay Checks Out New Apps
| 4,367 | December 6, 2012 | Bill O'Reilly, Krysten Ritter | Paloma Faith |
It's The Most Wonderful Time Of The Year!, Jaywalking: The Eyes Have It: Naughty Or Nice
| 4,368 | December 7, 2012 | Leslie Mann, Jim Rome | Garbage |
It's The Most Wonderful Time Of The Year!, Bet You Didn't See That Coming, Howie Mandel drops off gifts and promotes Take It All, America's Best American
| 4,369 | December 10, 2012 | Matt Damon, Chris Pratt | Of Monsters and Men |
Headlines
| 4,370 | December 11, 2012 | Ewan McGregor, Bailee Madison | Allen Stone |
It's The Most Wonderful Time Of The Year!, Does This Thrill Bill?
| 4,371 | December 12, 2012 | Albert Brooks, Kerry Washington | Willy Moon |
Future Los Angeles Laker?, Real Food For Fat-Ass Americans Or Something Disgusting We Made Up?, Trevor Moore Tests New Products
| 4,372 | December 13, 2012 | Hugh Jackman, Justin Willman | JD McPherson |
It's The Most Wonderful Time Of The Year!, Future Los Angeles Laker?, The Difference Between Men And Women, Off The Wall
| 4,373 | December 14, 2012 | Judd Apatow, Tavis Smiley | Pentationix |
Future Los Angeles Laker?, Soap Or Swift?, Similar... Yet Completely Different, Jaywalking: Good Caroler Bad Caroler
| 4,374 | December 17, 2012 | Megan Fox, Johnny Manziel | Colbie Caillat |
Old Geezer Or Turkey?, Is His Head Bigger Than Mine?: Golden Globe Edition, Headlines
| 4,375 | December 18, 2012 | Quentin Tarantino, LeAnn Rimes | LeAnn Rimes |
It's The Most Wonderful Time Of The Year!, Jay's Christmas Gift Ideas
| 4,376 | December 19, 2012 | Jamie Foxx, Carl Reiner | Cassadee Pope |
It's The Most Wonderful Time Of The Year!, Awkward Holiday Moments
| 4,377 | December 20, 2012 | Katherine Heigl, Marjorie Johnson | Johnny Mathis |
It's The Most Wonderful Time Of The Year!, Jaywalking: December 21, 2012
| 4,378 | December 21, 2012 | Terry Bradshaw, Elle Fanning | Chris Mann |
It's The Most Wonderful Time Of The Year!, Jay's Last Minute Holiday Help
