= List of The Tonight Show with Jay Leno episodes (2011) =

- No. of episodes: 215

Release
- Original network: NBC

Season chronology
- ← Previous; 2010 episodes Next → 2012 episodes

This is a list of episodes for The Tonight Show with Jay Leno that aired in 2011.

== 2011 ==
=== January ===
No.	Original release date	Guest(s)	Musical/entertainment guest(s)
3959	January 3, 2011	Ron Howard, Nicole "Snooki" Polizzi	Sick Puppies
Time To Get A Wireless Microphone, Value Meal Or Last Meal, Headlines
3,960	January 4, 2011	Queen Latifah, Gustavo Dudamel	Alter Bridge
Would Your Hair Look Better As A Beard?, Why You Should Never Install A Ceiling Fan When You're Stoned, Photo Booth
3,961	January 5, 2011	Jamie Foxx, Leighton Meester	Jamie Foxx
Always Check What Your Co-Anchor Is Wearing, Bet You Didn't See That Coming, Jay Looks At New Editions Of Classic Kids Books
3,962	January 6, 2011	Hilary Swank, Jesse Eisenberg	Los Lobos
Adam Carolla With Jackass Of The Year
3,963	January 7, 2011	Jim Parsons, Hailee Steinfeld	Lukas Nelson & Promise of the Real
Q&A With T&J
3,964	January 10, 2011	Jennifer Lopez, Steven Tyler, Randy Jackson, Ryan Seacrest, Dan Ahdoot	Diane Birch
Always Know When The Camera's On, Jim Norton At The BCS Bowl
3,965	January 11, 2011	Bill Maher, Cam Newton	The Duke Spirit
Headlines
3,966	January 12, 2011	Seth Rogen, Dr. Brady Barr	Bettye LaVette
What I'd Like to See Happen On The Bachelor, Jaywalking: How to Make a Good Impression
3,967	January 13, 2011	Cameron Diaz, Eric Stonestreet	The Civil Wars
What's Larry King Doing Today?, Products for a Better You
3,968	January 14, 2011	Michael Douglas, Animals with SeaWorld's Julie Scardina	Randy Rogers Band
Funny... But Not That Funny, Ready... Set... Ohhhh., Internet Success & Failure
3,969	January 17, 2011	Gordon Ramsay, Kathleen Madigan	Maroon 5
Would Your Hair Look Better As A Beard?: Celebrity Edition, What's Larry King Doing Today?, Ross Mathews At The Golden Globe Awards
3,970	January 18, 2011	Ashton Kutcher, Aubrey Plaza	Neon Trees
Not A Bieber Fan, Headlines
3,971	January 19, 2011	Amy Poehler, Mike "The Situation" Sorrentino	Grace Potter and The Nocturnals
Jaywalking: What's Wrong With This Picture?
3,972	January 20, 2011	Ben Affleck, Inez Harries & Venice Shaw	The Decemberists
What's This Guy Taking A Picture Of?, Dan Finnerty Finds Missed Connections
3,973	January 21, 2011	Kathie Lee Gifford & Hoda Kotb, Armie Hammer	Hayes Carll
What's Larry King Doing Today?, A Moment Of Reflection, Stuff We Found On eBay
3,974	January 24, 2011	Dana Carvey, Maggie Q	Lizz Wright
Headlines
3,975	January 25, 2011	Jason Statham, Melissa McCarthy	White Lies
Nickname For A Mobster Or Nickelodeon Character?, What I'd Like To See Happen On The Bachelor, Pumpcasting
3,976	January 26, 2011	Annette Bening, Frank Caliendo	Amos Lee
Nickname For A Mobster Or Nickelodeon Character?, Meal Or No Meal
3,977	January 27, 2011	Kathy Bates, Brad Womack	Billy Currington
Nickname For A Mobster Or Nickelodeon Character?, Mikey Day With JMZ
3,978	January 28, 2011	Justin Bieber, Jay Mohr	The Band Perry
The Snubbie Awards
3,979	January 31, 2011	Adam Sandler, Larry the Cable Guy	Esperanza Spalding
Who Said It? 5th Grader Or U.S. Senator?, Headlines

=== February ===
No.	Original release date	Guest(s)	Musical/entertainment guest(s)
3,980	February 1, 2011	Helena Bonham Carter, Timothy Olyphant	One eskimO
How Long Will It Take?, Jaywalking: Guide To Valentine's Day
3,981	February 2, 2011	Jesse Eisenberg, Jennifer Lawrence	Ryan Bingham
Your Tax Dollars At Work, Jay Celebrates Super Bowl XLV
3,982	February 3, 2011	Jeff Bridges, Dianna Agron	Bobby Long
What Did You Think Was Gonna Happen?, Nickname For A Mobster Or Nickelodeon Character?, Products That Should Never Merge
3,983	February 4, 2011	Hugh Laurie, Hailee Steinfeld	Finesse Mitchell
Would Your Hair Look Better As A Beard?, Ross Mathews At The Super Bowl
3,984	February 7, 2011	Mark Wahlberg, Lachlan Patterson	James Blunt
Presidential Meal Or Last Meal?, Too Old For Bieber Hair!, Photo Booth
3,985	February 8, 2011	Javier Bardem, Paula Abdul	Merle Haggard
What's Larry King Doing Today?, What I'd Like To See Happen On The Bachelor, Headlines
3,986	February 9, 2011	Matt LeBlanc, Clay Matthews	Ricky Martin
Who Said It? Sarah Palin Or Larry the Cable Guy, Jaywalking: You Be The Nominee: Grammy Edition
3,987	February 10, 2011	Rob Lowe, Amber Riley	Nicki Minaj
Dumb Dumb Dumb Dumb, Sexy Or Goofy?, A 99 Cent Valentine's Day
3,988	February 11, 2011	Kathy Griffin, Gayle King	The Black Keys
Love Advice With Jay & Jim Norton
3,989	February 14, 2011	Lady Gaga, Sofía Vergara	John Legend
Mike "The Situation" Sorrentino At The Grammys
3,990	February 15, 2011	Liam Neeson, Animals with Dave Salmoni	Gretchen Wilson
Headlines
3,991	February 16, 2011	Charles Barkley, Jenni "JWoww" Farley	Red
Where's Mubarak Today?, Middle-East Demonstrators Or Laker Fans? TV Scenes & Themes
3,992	February 17, 2011	Jenna Fischer, Abigail Breslin	Miguel
Mikey Day & Trevor Moore Play "Dare"
3,993	February 18, 2011	Mark Harmon, Dwight Howard	Thirty Seconds to Mars
Copy Cats
3,994	February 22, 2011	Owen Wilson, Rachel Maddow	Anberlin
Headlines
3,995	February 23, 2011	Randy Jackson, Nick Swardson	Travie McCoy
Wacky Bastard.com, Ridiculous 911 Calls
3,996	February 24, 2011	Meredith Vieira, Pauly D	Hanson
Man Vs. Machine, The Surly Psychic
3,997	February 25, 2011	Emily Blunt, Jackson Murphy	Chris Medina
Where Did Charlie Sheen Show Up Today?, Jaywalking: Green Screen Oscars
3,998	February 28, 2011	Christina Applegate, John Fulton	Michael Franti
What Did You Think Was Gonna Happen?, Ross Mathews Inside Elton John's Oscar Party

=== March ===
No.	Original release date	Guest(s)	Musical/entertainment guest(s)
3,999	March 1, 2011	Matt Damon, Betty White	Cake
Headlines
4,000	March 2, 2011	Simon Cowell, Jeff Gordon	Travis Barker
What Did You Think Was Gonna Happen?, Battle Of The Jaywalk All-Stars
4,001	March 3, 2011	Jerry Seinfeld, Bailee Madison	Darlene Love
Where Did Charlie Sheen Show Up Today?, Hidden Warnings On Favorite Products
4,002	March 4, 2011	Aaron Eckhart, Christie Brinkley	Thompson Square
Would Your Beard Look Better As Hair?, Rove McManus Visits The Eelpout Festival
4,003	March 14, 2011	Jane Lynch, Chris Matthews	Avril Lavigne
Maybe Crime Ain't Your Thing, Headlines
4,004	March 15, 2011	Wanda Sykes, Simon Pegg	Juanes
Jaywalking: Do You Speak Teen?
4,005	March 16, 2011	Matthew McConaughey, Rizwan Manji	Michael Kosta
Meal Or No Meal
4,006	March 17, 2011	Rainn Wilson, Epic Meal Time	Serj Tankian
It's Funny In Cleveland, St. Patrick's Day Guinness World Record
4,007	March 18, 2011	Robert Pattinson, Whitney Cummings	Alice Cooper with Special Guest Dweezil Zappa
NCAA Video Metaphor, Gaddafi Outfit Or Vegas Casino Carpet?, Stuff We Found On eBay
4,008	March 21, 2011	Zachary Levi, Lisa Lampanelli	Raphael Saadiq
Headlines
4,009	March 22, 2011	Bradley Cooper, Rebecca Black	Duran Duran
Jim Norton At Spring Break
4,010	March 23, 2011	Carol Burnett, Jason Ritter	Keith Urban
Jaywalking: Women's History Month
4,011	March 24, 2011	Kirstie Alley, Jon "Bones" Jones	Peter Bjorn & John
New Editions Of Classic Kids' Books
4,012	March 25, 2011	Jennifer Hudson, William H. Macy	Jennifer Hudson
Q&A With T&J
4,013	March 28, 2011	Russell Brand, Lorraine Nicholson	Los Lonely Boys
The Rest Of The Commercial, Police Blotter
4,014	March 29, 2011	Howie Mandel, Zachary Gordon	Dierks Bentley
Does This Thrill Bill?
4,015	March 30, 2011	Helen Hunt, Sammy Hagar	Good Charlotte
Headlines
4,016	March 31, 2011	Kourtney & Kim Kardashian, Fareed Zakaria	Mary Mary
Pumpcasting

=== April ===
No.	Original release date	Guest(s)	Musical/entertainment guest(s)
4,017	April 1, 2011	Vin Diesel, Ashley Tisdale	Scissor Sisters
April Fool's Day Pranks, From American Idol, Naima & Thia
4,018	April 4, 2011	Tracy Morgan, Neve Campbell	Augustana
Mister Inappropriate, How Long Will It Take?, Text Messages Gone Wrong
4,019	April 5, 2011	Dwayne Johnson, Taylor Swift	Fitz and the Tantrums
What Did You Think Was Gonna Happen?: Spring Break Edition, Headlines
4,020	April 6, 2011	Matthew Morrison, Carrie Underwood	Matthew Morrison
Rove McManus At WrestleMania
4,021	April 7, 2011	Emma Roberts, Gary Busey	Jeff Beck with Imelda May
Jay Celebrates Poetry Month
4,022	April 8, 2011	David Arquette, Ben Bailey	Far East Movement
Jaywalking: Good Dancer Or Bad Dancer?, Pia Toscano sits in with the band
4,023	April 11, 2011	Jamie Foxx, Jesse Heimen	k.d. lang and the Siss Boom Bang
Outrageous Tax Deductions
4,024	April 12, 2011	Kristen Bell, Chumlee	Sara Evans
Would Your Hair Look Better As A Beard?, Jaywalking: Greenscreen Duets
4,025	April 13, 2011	Diane Lane, Chris Jericho	Jessie J
Headlines
4,026	April 14, 2011	Tyler Perry, Kendra Wilkinson	Bright Eyes
The Humanalyzer
4,027	April 15, 2011	John Travolta, Leslie Mann	Eliza Doolittle
Internet Success & Failure, Paul McDonald sits in with the band
4,028	April 25, 2011	Christina Aguilera, Paul Reiser	Alison Krauss & Union Station featuring Jerry Douglas
Always Know When The Camera's On, Headlines
4,029	April 26, 2011	Lindsay Lohan, Jillian Michaels	The Airborne Toxic Event
Jaywalking: The Royals
4,030	April 27, 2011	Rene Russo, Kevin Hart	Buddy Guy
NFL Labor Dispute Video Metaphor, Love Advice With Jim Norton
4,031	April 28, 2011	Chelsea Handler, Judd Apatow	OK Go
Come On! It's Just An Elephant's Trunk!, 99 Cent Royal Wedding Gifts
4,032	April 29, 2011	Rob Lowe, Susan Lucci	Moby
Dame Edna Reports From The Royal Wedding, Casey Abrams sits in with the band

=== May ===
No.	Original release date	Guest(s)	Musical/entertainment guest(s)
4,033	May 2, 2011	Paul Walker, Donny & Marie Osmond	Donny & Marie Osmond
Value Meal Or Last Meal, Police Blotter
4,034	May 3, 2011	Penélope Cruz, Nick Thune	Ricky Martin
Photo Booth
4,035	May 4, 2011	Kate Hudson, Chris Hemsworth	Sérgio Mendes with Siedah Garrett
Headlines
4,036	May 5, 2011	Wanda Sykes, Ralph Macchio	Priscilla Ahn
Gift Ideas For Mother's Day
4,037	May 6, 2011	Steven Tyler, Aubrey Plaza	The Civil Wars
Too Old To Look Like Harry Potter, Dan Finnerty Finds Missed Connections, Jacob Lusk sits in with the band
4,038	May 9, 2011	Jennifer Lopez, Jesse Tyler Ferguson	BC Jean
You Can't Dye Your Moustache Without Dying Your Hair, Jim Norton At The Kentucky Derby
4,039	May 10, 2011	Animals with Julie Scardina, Ginnifer Goodwin	Def Leppard
Mister Inappropriate, Headlines
4,040	May 11, 2011	Dick Van Dyke, Khloé Kardashian Odom	Steve Earle
Products That Should Never Merge
4,041	May 12, 2011	Ann Curry, Hines Ward	The Kills
Battle Of The Jaywalk All-Stars
4,042	May 13, 2011	Jodie Foster, Ken Jeong	Rodrigo y Gabriela
Mikey Day & Trevor Moore Play Dare, James Durbin sits in with the band
4,043	May 16, 2011	Eva Mendes, Reed Timmer	Tedeschi Trucks Band
Similar... yet Completely Different, Is It Older Than Hugh Hefner?, Hidden Messages In Famous Logos
4,044	May 17, 2011	Ryan Seacrest, Jordana Brewster	TV on the Radio
How Long Will It Take?, Does This Thrill Bill?
4,045	May 18, 2011	Ed Helms, Chelsea Kane	Iron & Wine
Karma For The Cameraman, Is It Older Than Hugh Hefner?, Headlines
4,046	May 19, 2011	Jack Black, Mike Huckabee	Parachute
Ridiculous 911 Calls
4,047	May 20, 2011	Kirstie Alley, Erik Rivera	Il Volo
The Surly Psychic
4,048	May 23, 2011	Dustin Hoffman, Meghan McCain	The Script
Is It Older Than Hugh Hefner?, Headlines
4,049	May 24, 2011	Meredith Vieira, Demetri Martin	Ben Harper
What Happens When Your Cat Doesn't Like Your Plumber, Jaywalking: Oakwood's Blockbusters!
4,050	May 25, 2011	Chaz Bono, Dr. Brady Barr	Foster the People
Would Your Hair Look Better As A Beard?: Celebrity Edition, Copy Cats
4,051	May 26, 2011	Piers Morgan, Lauren Alaina	Scott Weiland
Jay Gives A Commencement Speech
4,052	May 27, 2011	Paris Hilton, Dhani Jones	INXS featuring Pat Monahan
Rove McManus At The Calaveras County Frog Jumping Jubilee

=== June ===
No.	Original release date	Guest(s)	Musical/entertainment guest(s)
4,053	June 6, 2011	Katie Couric, Cee Lo Green	Cee Lo Green
What's Funnier Than A Couple Of Drunk Russians?, Is It Older Than Hugh Hefner?, Ross Mathews At The MTV Movie Awards
4,054	June 7, 2011	Kevin Bacon, Bethenny Frankel	OneRepublic
Headlines
4,055	June 8, 2011	Jada Pinkett Smith, Elle Fanning	Lenka
Is It Older Than Hugh Hefner?, Too Nerdy To Look Like Bono, Jay's Twist On Classic TV Moments
4,056	June 9, 2011	Jim Carrey, Selena Gomez	Tinie Tempah
Jaywalking: Your Relationship: Who Knows More?
4,057	June 10, 2011	Bill Cosby, Kris & Bruce Jenner	Neon Trees
Is It Older Than Hugh Hefner?, Meal Or No Meal
4,058	June 13, 2011	Jason Sudeikis, Adam Levine	Ziggy Marley
Where's Weiner Today?, TV Scenes & Themes
4,059	June 14, 2011	Kim Kardashian, Lior Suchard	Randy Travis featuring Josh Turner
Dumb Dumb Dumb Dumb, It's Time For Deodorant, Headlines
4,060	June 15, 2011	Blake Lively, Blake Shelton	Scotty McCreery
Stuff We Found On eBay
4,061	June 16, 2011	Larry David, Ashley Herbert	Pitbull featuring Ne-Yo
Pumpcasting
4,062	June 17, 2011	Josh Duhamel, Jay Mohr	Jill Scott
Trending Tomorrow
4,063	June 20, 2011	Larry the Cable Guy, Dorothy Custer	LMFAO
Timing Is Everything, Rove McManus At The Inventors' Convention
4,064	June 21, 2011	Rosario Dawson, Marc Anthony	Jackie Evancho
Headlines
4,065	June 22, 2011	Louis C.K., Richard Engel	Raphael Saadiq featuring Robert Randolph
Similar... yet Completely Different, Too Fat To Look Like Harry Potter, Jaywalking: Are You Smarter Than Sarah Palin?
4,066	June 23, 2011	Justin Timberlake, Kevin Hart	The Antlers
Real Food For Fat-Ass Americans Or Something Disgusting We Made Up?, New Summer Products
4,067	June 24, 2011	David Spade, Tom Papa	Plain White T's
Would Your Beard Look Better As Hair?, The Voice Finalists, The Humanalyzer

=== July ===
No.	Original release date	Guest(s)	Musical/entertainment guest(s)
4,068	July 5, 2011	Lisa Kudrow, Billy Gardell	Natasha Bedingfield
The Difference Between Moms & Dads, Headlines
4,069	July 6, 2011	Animals with Julie Scardina, Mary-Louise Parker	Billy Ray Cyrus
Which One Is The Biggest Idiot?, The Road To The Olympics, Jaywalking: Jay's Office Vacation
4,070	July 7, 2011	Kevin James, Ali Wong	Javier Colon
The Difference Between Moms & Dads, Police Blotter
4,071	July 8, 2011	Kathie Lee Gifford & Hoda Kotb, Captain Sig Hansen	Ashton Shephard
Guess What He Does For A Living!, Video Metaphor For Raising The Debt Ceiling, Is His Head Bigger Than Mine?, Does This Thrill Bill?
4,072	July 11, 2011	Howie Mandel, David Feherty	Joss Stone with Dave Stewart
Jaywalking: Jaywalk Online Dating
4,073	July 12, 2011	Seth Meyers, Marjorie Johnson	Barry Manilow
The Road To The Olympics, Headlines
4,074	July 13, 2011	Craig Ferguson, Rose Byrne	David Cook
Is His Head Bigger Than Mine?, Photo Booth
4,075	July 14, 2011	Don Rickles, Bristol Palin	Colbie Caillat
What I'd Like To See Happen On The Bachelorette, Jim Norton Reports From The ESPY's
4,076	July 15, 2011	Bryan Cranston, Nancy Grace	Shaggy
Surefire Sign Your Candidate Is Not Jewish, Excellence in Broadcasting, Jay Checks Out New Apps
4,077	July 18, 2011	Neil Patrick Harris, Buddy Valastro	Imelda May
Not Everybody Should Do Comedy, Jaywalking: Real-Life Horrible Bosses
4,078	July 19, 2011	Jenna Fischer, Cloris Leachman	3 Doors Down
Headlines
4,079	July 20, 2011	Daniel Craig, Anthony Robles	Gavin DeGraw
Products For Summer Vacation
4,080	July 21, 2011	Emma Stone, Adam Carolla	Rickey Minor and Friends
Trevor Moore Warns People About Scandals
4,081	July 22, 2011	Dolly Parton, Ben Bailey	Dolly Parton
Internet Success & Failure
4,082	July 25, 2011	Jessica Alba, Sue Johanson	Gomez
The Road To The Olympics, Is His Head Bigger Than Mine?, Jim Norton At Comic-Con
4,083	July 26, 2011	Shaun White, Olivia Wilde	Train
When They Were Young, Headlines
4,084	July 27, 2011	Chris Tucker, Skipper Bivins & Trent Jackson	Vanessa Carlton
Value Meal Or Last Meal, Hidden Messages In Famous Logos
4,085	July 28, 2011	Matt LeBlanc, Freida Pinto	Stevie Nicks
Magic Clerk
4,086	July 29, 2011	Gillian Anderson, Aziz Ansari	Kelly Rowland
Asian Market Watch, Steve Carell Stops By And Offers Audience Free Passes To See Crazy, Stupid, Love., A Jaywalking Tour Through American History

=== August ===
No.	Original release date	Guest(s)	Musical/entertainment guest(s)
4,087	August 1, 2011	Ryan Reynolds, Sheryl Crow	Matt Nathanson
What's This Guy Taking A Picture Of?, Is America Falling Behind In Engineering?, What Is This?, Jaywalking: Hey! What's The Deal? RU4REAL?
4,088	August 2, 2011	Katie Holmes, Novak Djokovic	Mat Kearney
Debts Of Our Lives, Headlines
4,089	August 3, 2011	Jeremy Piven, Kelly Osbourne	Mariachi El Bronx
Building Character Through Sports, Hidden Warnings On Favorite Products
4,090	August 4, 2011	Roseanne Barr, Jason Momoa	Lykke Li
Your Local News, How Your Tonight Show Works
4,091	August 5, 2011	Dennis Miller, Dennis Rodman	Rye Rye featuring Robyn
Video Metaphor For A Double-Dip Recession, Rove McManus At The Lumberjack World Championships
4,092	August 8, 2011	Gordon Ramsay, Bryce Dallas Howard	Panic! at the Disco
Newton's Third Law Of Motion, Is His Head Bigger Than Mine?, Hot Or Not?, Ridiculous 911 Calls
4,093	August 9, 2011	Jesse Eisenberg, Mike "The Situation" Sorrentino	Cage the Elephant
Ooh... I Wish I Hadn't Said That..., The Road To The Olympics, Headlines
4,094	August 10, 2011	Joel McHale, Viola Davis	Ximena Sarinana
Video Metaphor For This Week's Financial Crisis, Hey, Is That Guy Sleeping?, Anybody Got A Step Stool?, Woulda Coulda Shoulda
4,095	August 11, 2011	Sam Worthington, Bailee Madison	Willie Barcena
Up To Good Or No Good?, Let It Go, Bro, What's Trending Tomorrow
4,096	August 12, 2011	Jane Fonda, Elizabeth Banks	Maná
Video Metaphor For The U.S. Economy, Not The Sharpest Knife In The Drawer, Jamie Foxx Promotes In the Flow with Affion Crockett, Jaywalking: You Be The Nominee: VMA Edition
4,097	August 29, 2011	Animals with Julie Scardina, David Koechner	Cake
99 Cent Store End Of Summer Bargains
4,098	August 30, 2011	Jeff Bridges, Nicole "Snooki" Polizzi	Jeff Bridges and The Abiders
How Fat Are We Getting In This Country?, Is His Head Bigger Than Mine?, Headlines
4,099	August 31, 2011	Allison Janney, Jay Mohr	OK Go with Animal from The Muppets
The Humanalyzer

=== September ===
No.	Original release date	Guest(s)	Musical/entertainment guest(s)
4,100	September 1, 2011	Heidi Klum, Kevin Smith	Fitz and The Tantrums
Always Check What Your Field Reporters Are Wearing, The Road To The Olympics, Mister Inappropriate: Junior Edition, Pitch To America
4,101	September 2, 2011	Dick Cheney, Carrot Top	Andy Grammer
Police Blotter
4,102	September 6, 2011	Wanda Sykes, Nick Swardson	Roger Daltrey
Headlines
4,103	September 7, 2011	Kristin Chenoweth, Chris Colfer	Kristin Chenoweth
Presidential Candidate Or Hemorrhoid Sufferer?, Back To School Products
4,104	September 8, 2011	Will Arnett, Anna Kendrick	Tinie Tempah
Creepiest Stare Of The Night, Rove McManus Visits The Home Of The Green Bay Packers
4,105	September 9, 2011	Bill Maher, Octavia Spencer	Alice Cooper
Is It Sexy?, Adam The Page Learns New Pick-Up Lines
4,106	September 12, 2011	Christina Applegate, DJ Pauly D	Glen Campbell
Get To Know Your 2012 Candidates, Headlines
4,107	September 13, 2011	Ellen DeGeneres, Bob Harper	Cobra Starship
Jaywalking: Jaywalk Citizenship Test
4,108	September 14, 2011	Jane Lynch, Demetri Martin	NEEDTOBREATHE
Is His Head Bigger Than Mine?: Political Edition, You Can't Outsource Rock 'N Roll, Jim Norton At Fashion Week
4,109	September 15, 2011	Charlie Sheen, Kevin Hart	LMFAO
Magic Clerk
4,110	September 16, 2011	Jason Statham, Michele Bachmann	Lady Antebellum
Meal Or No Meal
4,111	September 19, 2011	Simon Cowell, Natasha Leggero	Selena Gomez
What's Rick Perry Doing Right Now?, Headlines
4,112	September 20, 2011	Gerard Butler, Whitney Cummings	Kelly Clarkson
It Sounds Dirty But It's Not, Stuff We Found On eBay
4,113	September 21, 2011	Amy Poehler, Joseph Gordon-Levitt	The Kooks
Copy Cats
4,114	September 22, 2011	Jamie Foxx, Michelle Monaghan	Bush
What Did This Guy Just Find Out?, The Surly Psychic
4,115	September 23, 2011	Hugh Jackman, Maya Rudolph	Tony Bennett
Failed TV Pilots
4,116	September 26, 2011	Ryan Gosling, Pauley Perrette	Arctic Monkeys
Headlines
4,117	September 27, 2011	Lauren Graham, Seth MacFarlane	Seth MacFarlane
Your Local News, Products That Should Never Merge
4,118	September 28, 2011	Ed Helms, Deena Nicole Cortese	Lisa Hannigan
Does This Thrill Bill?
4,119	September 29, 2011	Albert Brooks, Chaz Bono	TV on the Radio
It's Your Choice, Police Blotter
4,120	September 30, 2011	Hugh Laurie, Herman Cain	The Airborne Toxic Event
Jaywalking: Kidecision 2012

=== October ===
No.	Original release date	Guest(s)	Musical/entertainment guest(s)
4,121	October 3, 2011	Evangeline Lilly, Magic Johnson	Jo Koy
Headlines
4,122	October 4, 2011	Kim Kardashian & Kris Humphries, Kenny Wormald	LeAnn Rimes
State Phone Call Greetings, Why Did They Cut To This Guy?, Photo Booth
4,123	October 5, 2011	Tim Allen, Theresa Caputo	Scotty McCreery
State Phone Call Greetings, Ask Jay Anything
4,124	October 6, 2011	Steve Martin, Jack Black & Owen Wilson, Aubrey Plaza	Blondie
Is His Head Bigger Than Mine?, Jaywalking: Good Neighbor Jay
4,125	October 7, 2011	David Arquette, Darrell & Brandon Sheets	Puddle of Mudd
State Phone Call Greetings, Your Local News, What's Trending Tomorrow
4,126	October 10, 2011	Aaron Eckhart, Julianne Hough	Amos Lee featuring Calexico
Headlines
4,127	October 11, 2011	Julie Bowen, Animals with Dave Salmoni	Imelda May
Trevor Moore Tests New Products
4,128	October 12, 2011	Zooey Deschanel, J.R. Martinez	Fountains of Wayne
If The Candidates Were As Dramatic As The Music, We Are So Screwed!, Woulda Coulda Shoulda
4,129	October 13, 2011	Zachary Levi, Barry Rothbart	Gloria Estefan
Hidden Messages In Famous Logos
4,130	October 14, 2011	Terry Bradshaw, Rowan Atkinson	Game
Jaywalking: Jaywalk Tour Of American History
4,131	October 24, 2011	Jonah Hill, Paula Deen	Chris Isaak
Pumpcasting
4,132	October 25, 2011	President Barack Obama	Yo-Yo Ma & Friends
Headlines, Man Vs. Nature
4,133	October 26, 2011	Amanda Seyfried, John Cho & Kal Penn	Kathleen Madigan
Adam's Costume Tryouts
4,134	October 27, 2011	Chelsea Handler, Drew Manning	The Original 7ven
Video Metaphor For The Federal Housing Finance Agency's Mortgage Relief Plan, Badass Or Dumbass?, Jaywalking: Jaywalk Green Scream
4,135	October 28, 2011	Adam Sandler, Rob Kardashian	Awolnation
Scary Pranks On The Internet
4,136	October 31, 2011	Justin Bieber, David Freese	Lloyd
Who Said It?, Scary Halloween Products

=== November ===
No.	Original release date	Guest(s)	Musical/entertainment guest(s)
4,137	November 1, 2011	Eddie Murphy, "Turtleman" Ernie Brown, Jr.	Robyn
Get To Know Your 2012 Candidates, Headlines
4,138	November 2, 2011	Taylor Lautner, Martha Stewart	Daughtry
Magic Clerk
4,139	November 3, 2011	Kristen Stewart, Dave Attell	Joe Jonas
Police Blotter
4,140	November 4, 2011	Miss Piggy, Mickey Rourke	Mutemath
Rove Across America
4,141	November 7, 2011	Ellen Barkin, Henry Cavill	Iris by Cirque du Soleil
Headlines
4,142	November 8, 2011	Jason Segel, Kris Jenner	Lyle Lovett
Road To The Super Bowl, Ridiculous 911 Calls
4,143	November 9, 2011	Kelsey Grammer, Sarah Hyland	Andrea Bocelli
Battle Of The Jaywalk All-Stars
4,144	November 10, 2011	Whitney Cummings, Chris Matthews	Il Divo
Jay & Jim Norton Answer Audience Questions
4,145	November 11, 2011	Eric Stonestreet, J.R. Martinez	Nicole Scherzinger
Meal Or No Meal
4,146	November 14, 2011	Amy Adams, Rocket City Rednecks	Miranda Lambert
Headlines
4,147	November 15, 2011	Howie Mandel, Nicole "Snooki" Polizzi	Patrick Stump
Stuff We Found On eBay
4,148	November 16, 2011	Robin Williams, Drew Hastings	Johnny Gill
Copy Cats
4,149	November 17, 2011	Jimmy Fallon, Drew Brees	Gym Class Heroes
The Road To The Olympics, Jay Checks Out The Latest Product Warnings
4,150	November 18, 2011	Jim Parsons, Meghan McCain	Tom Morello featuring Ben Harper
Photo Booth
4,151	November 21, 2011	Dennis Miller, David & Sean La Vau	Javier Colon
Which Has More Calories?, What Planet Do These People Live On?, Headlines
4,152	November 22, 2011	Animals with Julie Scardina, Dane Cook	Hot Chelle Rae
Rove Across America: Thanksgiving Edition
4,153	November 23, 2011	Whitney Cummings, Dwight Howard	Gloriana
Video Metaphor For The Super Committee, Ask Jay Anything
4,154	November 28, 2011	Kirstie Alley, Damon Wayans, Jr.	She & Him
Timing Is Everything: Holiday Edition, Road To The Super Bowl, Headlines
4,155	November 29, 2011	Kathy Bates, Jay Mohr	Switchfoot
It's The Most Wonderful Time Of The Year!, A 99 Cent Christmas
4,156	November 30, 2011	Bill Cosby, Raini Rodriguez	Iron & Wine
How Long Will It Take?, The Road To The Olympics, Off The Wall

=== December ===
No.	Original release date	Guest(s)	Musical/entertainment guest(s)
4,157	December 1, 2011	Melissa McCarthy, Governor Rick Perry	T-Pain
Perception Vs. Reality, Jay Checks Out New Apps
4,158	December 2, 2011	Hilary Swank, Mike "The Situation" Sorrentino	Dia Frampton
A Tonight Show Teachable Moment, A Jaywalk Tour Of The Bible
4,159	December 5, 2011	Robert Downey Jr., Abigail Breslin	Alison Krauss & Union Station
Headlines
4,160	December 6, 2011	Katherine Heigl, J. B. Smoove	Taio Cruz
Holiday Cyber Shopping
4,161	December 7, 2011	Lea Michele, Adam Carolla	Neil Diamond
A Tonight Show Teachable Moment, Mikey Day & Trevor Moore Play Truth Or Dare
4,162	December 8, 2011	Katie Couric, Chris D'Elia	Matisyahu
Jaywalking: Jaywalk Holiday Quiz
4,163	December 9, 2011	Bill O'Reilly, Brian Miller & Adam Paulson	Jackie Evancho
Jay's Christmas Gift Ideas
4,164	December 12, 2011	Charlize Theron, Kevin Hart	Foster the People
Paper Or Plastic?, It's The Most Wonderful Time Of The Year!, Headlines
4,165	December 13, 2011	Dana Carvey, Jason Reitman	Lenny Kravitz
Worst Camera Shot Of The Week, It's The Most Wonderful Time Of The Year!, Woulda Coulda Shoulda
4,166	December 14, 2011	Louis C.K., Levi LaVallee	Young the Giant
A Message From Rick Perry, Jaywalking: Jay's Office Holiday
4,167	December 15, 2011	Al Michaels & Cris Collinsworth, Elle Fanning	Robin Thicke
It's The Most Wonderful Time Of The Year!, The Worst Inventions Of The Year
4,168	December 16, 2011	Ron Paul, Joe Rogan	Mario Joyner
It's The Most Wonderful Time Of The Year!, Do You Really Need A Satellite To Know That?, Jay's 12 Days Of Christmas
4,169	December 19, 2011	Sandra Bullock, Diablo Cody	Pink Martini
It's The Most Wonderful Time Of The Year!, A Message From Rick Perry, The Reason Cats Have 9 Lives, Headlines
4,170	December 20, 2011	Charles Barkley, Bérénice Bejo	Amber Riley
It's The Most Wonderful Time Of The Year!, Too Old To High Five!, What's Trending Tomorrow
4,171	December 21, 2011	Thomas Haden Church, "Turtleman" Ernie Brown, Jr.	Johnny Mathis
It's The Most Wonderful Time Of The Year!, Holiday Pranks On YouTube
4,172	December 22, 2011	Jonah Hill, Chris Paul	Il Volo
The Difference Between Moms & Dads, Christmas Movie And TV Fails
4,173	December 23, 2011	Terry Bradshaw, Bailee Madison	Chris Isaak
It's The Most Wonderful Tine Of The Year!, Bet You Didn't See That Coming, Jaywalking: Good Caroler Bad Caroler
