= Travis S. Taylor =

American aerospace engineer, optical scientist and writer

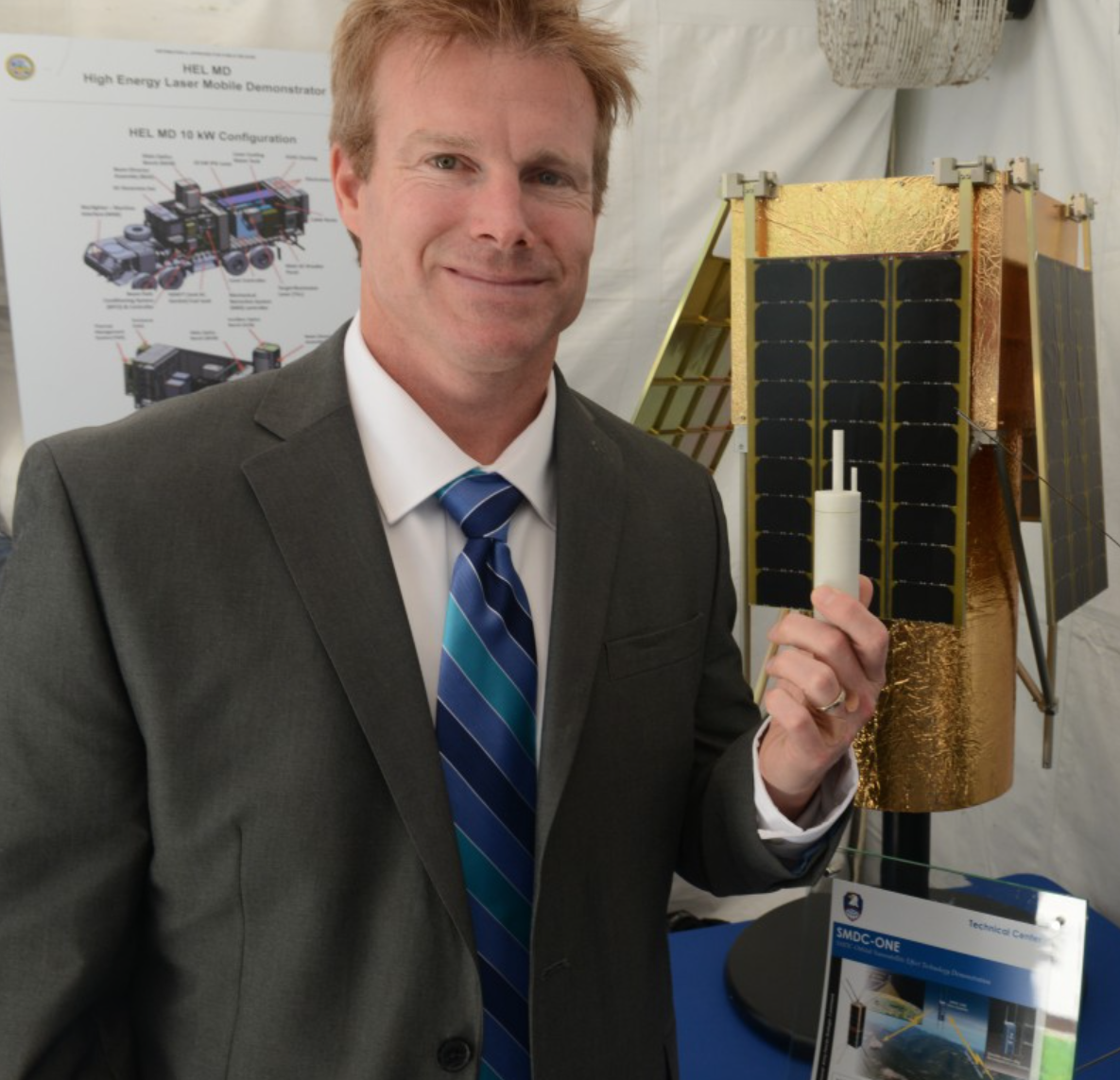
- Born: July 24, 1968 (age 58); Decatur, Alabama, USA
- Education: Auburn University (B.E.E.); University of Western Sydney (MS); University of Alabama, Huntsville (MS, PhD, MSE, PhD)
- Scientific career
- Workplaces: United States Department of Defense; NASA
- Thesis: Laboratory simulation of atmospheric turbulence induced optical wavefront distortion (1999)

Travis Shane Taylor (born July 24, 1968) is an American scientist, engineer, science fiction writer, and the star of National Geographic Channel's Rocket City Rednecks which aired 2011–2013. Taylor has written numerous technical papers, science fiction novels, and two textbooks. He has appeared in television documentaries including NGC's When Aliens Attack and is one of the primary investigative scientists on History Channel's The Secret of Skinwalker Ranch.

== Early life ==
Travis Shane Taylor was born on July 24, 1968, in Decatur, Alabama, in North Alabama. His father, Charles Taylor, worked as a machinist at Wyle Laboratories, which subcontracted for National Aeronautics and Space Administration (NASA) in the 1960s. As a boy, Taylor read science fiction and dismantled household electronics. While in high school, Taylor's family moved to Somerville, near Huntsville. At 17 years old, with the help of his neighbor, he built a radio telescope that won the state science fair. This led the Army to offer Taylor a job working at Redstone Arsenal on directed energy weapons systems directly out of high school as well as a scholarship.

== Education ==
Taylor earned a B.S. in electrical engineering from Auburn University in 1991, before going on to study at University of Alabama, Huntsville where he earned a MS in physics in 1994, a PhD in optical science and engineering in 1999, and a MSE in mechanical and aerospace engineering in 2001. He then completed a MS in astronomy in 2004 at the University of Western Sydney before earning a second PhD from University of Alabama, Huntsville in aerospace engineering in 2012.

== Career ==
By 2006, Taylor had worked on various programs for the United States Department of Defense and NASA for over sixteen years. He has researched several advanced propulsion concepts, very large space telescopes, space-based beamed energy systems, high-energy lasers, and next generation space launch concepts. Taylor has also been involved with Human intelligence (HUMINT), Imagery intelligence (IMINT), Signals intelligence (SIGINT) and Measurement and signature intelligence (MASINT) concept studies.

Taylor was the chief scientist on the Unidentified Aerial Phenomena Task Force (UAPTF). He is also a Principal Research Scientist at Radiance Technologies.

== Science fiction ==
According to Taylor, after he expressed his dissatisfaction with space opera and the comparative dearth of recent hard science fiction, he was challenged by his wife to write his first book, and studied Robert A. Heinlein's works for stylistic influence. His first novel, Warp Speed, was published in 2004. By 2020, Taylor had published 14 science fiction novels.

== Personal life ==
Taylor and his wife have two children, and they live in Somerville, Alabama.

== Television ==
Taylor first appeared in episodes of The Universe and Life After People for the History Channel in 2010, after his name came up in a search regarding space warfare. Taylor was then on National Geographic Channel's When Aliens Attack in 2011.

In the summer of 2011, the National Geographic Channel announced a new series called Rocket City Rednecks which features Taylor. The first episode showed in September 2011. A self-proclaimed 'redneck rocket scientist', Taylor focuses on 'hillbilly ingenuity' for the show's backyard science experiments, aided by his family and best friend, who are all machinists and inventors. The show ran for two seasons, from September 2011 to January 2013.

In 2015, he hosted the series 3 Scientists Walk into a Bar, which had four episodes in 2015. From 2017 he appeared on the History Channel show Ancient Aliens, starting in the Season 12 episode "Voices of the Gods," and following with appearances in 28 episodes through season 18. Additional History Channel appearances were on The Tesla Files and The Curse of Oak Island in 2019. Taylor, along with principal investigator Erik Bard, leads a History Channel series focusing on mysteries titled The Secret of Skinwalker Ranch, in which they investigate potentially anomalous phenomena. On other networks, he appeared in episodes of In Search of Monsters and NASA's Unexplained Files.

=== Filmography ===
Year	Title	Role	Production	Episodes	Notes
2009–2010	The Universe	Self	The History Channel	6 episodes	
2010	Life After People	Self	The History Channel	5 Episodes	
2011	When Aliens Attack	Self	National Geographic Channel	Film	
2011–2013	Rocket City Rednecks	Host and producer	National Geographic Channel	6 Episodes (Producer for 1 episode)	
2014	The Independents	Self	Fox Business	Apocalypse Now (2014)	
2015	3 Scientists Walk into a Bar	Host	The Weather Channel	4 episodes	
2018	The Tesla Files	Host	The History Channel	5 episodes	
2014–present	The Curse of Oak Island	Self	The History Channel	Rock Solid (2019)	
2019	In Search of Monsters	Self	Travel Channel	The Loch Ness Monster (2019)	
2019	NASA's Unexplained Files	Self	Science Channel	5 episodes	
2021	America's Book of Secrets	Self	The History Channel	5 episodes	
2017–2021	Ancient Aliens	Self	The History Channel	23 episodes	
2019–2021	The UnXplained	Self	The History Channel	15 episodes	
2022	A Tear in the Sky	Self	Omnium Media	Documentary Film	
2020–present	The Secret of Skinwalker Ranch( (Note: Alternative title "The Curse of Skinwalker Ranch" depending on region))	Self	The History Channel	27 episodes	

== Bibliography ==
=== Fiction ===
Year	Title	Series	Notes	References
2004	Warp Speed	Warp Speed		
2005	The Quantum Connection	Warp Speed		
2006	Von Neumann's War		Co-author with John Ringo	
2007	Vorpal Blade	Looking Glass	Co-author with John Ringo	
2007	One Day on Mars	Tau Ceti Agenda		
2007	The Tau Ceti Agenda	Tau Ceti Agenda		
2008	Human by Choice	Cresperian	Co-author with Darrell Bain	
2009	One Good Soldier	Tau Ceti Agenda		
2010	Back to the Moon	Space Excursion	Co-author with Les Johnson	
2011	Extraction Point!	Point	Co-author with Stephanie Osborn	
2015	Trail of Evil	Tau Ceti Agenda		
2016	On to the Asteroid	Space Excursion	Co-author with Les Johnson	
2017	Kill Before Dying	Tau Ceti Agenda		
2017	Moon Beam	Moon Beam	Co-author with Jody Lynn Nye	
2018	Bringers of Hell	Tau Ceti Agenda		
2019	Moon Tracks	Moon Beam	Co-author with Jody Lynn Nye	
2020	Battle Luna		Co-author with Kacey Ezell, Josh Hayes, Michael Z. Williamson, and Timothy Zahn	
2021	Saving Proxima		Co-author with Les Johnson	
2022	Ballistic			

=== Nonfiction books ===
Year	Title	publisher	Notes	References
2006	An Introduction to Planetary Defense	Brown Walker Press	Co-author Bob Boan	
2009	Introduction to Rocket Science and Engineering	CRC Press		
2010	The Science Behind The Secret	Baen Books		
2011	Alien Invasion	Baen Books	Co-author Bob Boan	
2012	A New American Space Plan	Baen Books	Co-author Stephanie Osburn	
2019	Introduction to Laser Science and Engineering	CRC Press		
