= Tesla Files =

Tesla Files refers to

- The Tesla Files - a nonfiction TV show about Nikola Tesla
- Tesla Files - a data breach at Tesla, Inc. that was shared with a German newspaper
