= Dorothy Custer =

American comedian and harmonicist

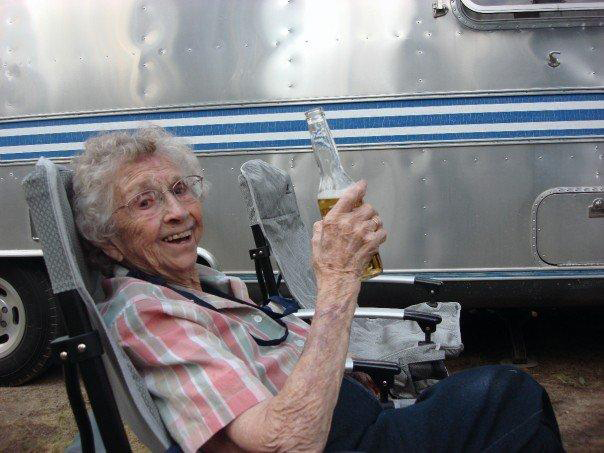
- Custer in 2009
- Born: Dorothy Bailey Cline; May 30, 1911; Hailey, Idaho, U.S.
- Died: April 22, 2015 (aged 103); Twin Falls, Idaho, U.S.
- Known for: Appearances on The Tonight Show with Jay Leno
- Spouse: Marvin Custer (m. 1937–2005, his death)
- Children: Carole, Neal, Colleen, Gary

Dorothy Bailey Cline Custer (May 30, 1911 – April 22, 2015) was an American comedian, harmonicist, and centenarian most famous for her two appearances on The Tonight Show with Jay Leno. She has since become the subject of the most-viewed story of all time on the website of Boise-based television station KTVB and has been the subject of numerous interviews in Idaho and other states.

Custer was born in 1911 in Hailey and grew up in Rock Creek south of present-day Hansen. She attended the College of Idaho and taught school in Murtaugh in the early 1930s. In 1937, she married Marvin Custer, who claimed descent from George Armstrong Custer. The couple moved to Twin Falls in 1939.

Custer began working as an amateur entertainer in 1916, eventually creating 13 characters as part of her stand-up routine. She had been an active harmonica player since 1923 and featured music in many of her acts, including her performances on the Tonight Show. Despite her long career, by her own admission Custer didn't achieve fame until after her first appearance on the Tonight Show in 2011 at age 100.

Custer was asked back later to Tonight Show where she sang "Let Me Call You Sweetheart" to Jay on Valentine's Day 2012.

In May 2012, Custer celebrated her 101st birthday by ziplining in the Snake River Canyon.

Author and physician Jacob M. Appel honored Custer by modeling a minor character after her in his novel The Man Who Wouldn't Stand Up (2012); in a 2013 interview, Custer said she was flattered by the honor but acknowledged not having read the book.

In June 2013, Custer celebrated her 102nd birthday by BASE jumping off the Perrine Bridge into the Snake River Canyon. She became the oldest BASE jumper with the help of Sean Chuma a world-renowned base jumper and BASE jumping instructor.

Custer died in her sleep on April 22, 2015, shortly before her 104th birthday in Twin Falls, Idaho.
