= I. B. Perrine =

American farmer, rancher and businessman (1861–1943)

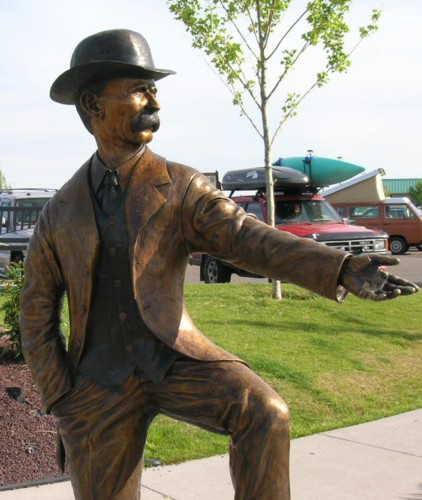
- Statue of Perrine in Twin Falls, Idaho
- Born: May 7, 1861; Delaware, Indiana
- Died: October 2, 1943 (aged 82); Twin Falls, Idaho
- Resting place: Jerome, Idaho
- Occupations: Farmer, rancher, businessman
- Known for: Credited as the founder of Twin Falls and other cities in the Magic Valley region of Idaho

Ira Burton Perrine (May 7, 1861 – October 2, 1943) was an Idaho farmer, rancher and businessman. Perrine is generally credited as the founder of Twin Falls and other towns in the Magic Valley region.

Born in Delaware, Indiana, Perrine's parents were George and Sarah Burton Perrine.

== Career ==
Perrine moved to Idaho Territory in 1884 and established a farm and ranch operation in the Snake River Canyon near present-day Jerome.

He was a successful farmer and rancher and received a gold medal for his fruit display at the 1904 Louisiana Purchase Exposition in St. Louis. The ranch remained in the Perrine family until 1964, when it was sold and became part of Blue Lakes Country Club.

Although Perrine's operation in the canyon received plenty of water, the surrounding area could not be easily irrigated and was therefore largely unproductive. Beginning in 1893, Perrine worked to convince private financiers to build a dam on the Snake River, along with a corresponding canal system to irrigate the area. This work culminated in the 1900 founding of the Twin Falls Land and Water Company and the subsequent completion of Milner Dam in 1905.

After Twin Falls was founded in 1904, Perrine served as a bank president and owned a hotel in the new city.

== Legacy ==
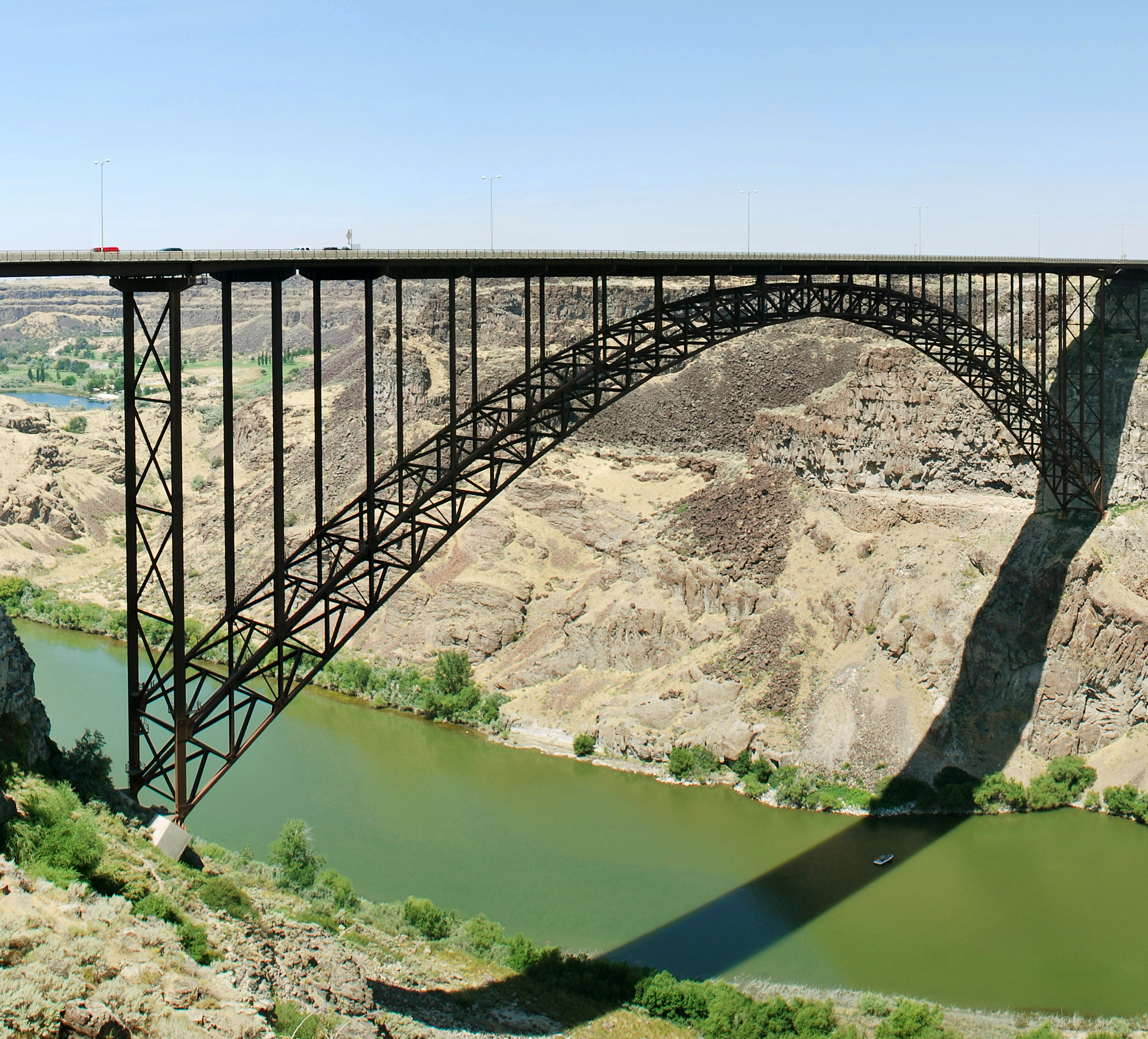
Perrine Bridge over Snake River Canyon

Perrine died at age 82 in 1943 and is buried at the family cemetery near his former ranch in Jerome County.

The Perrine Bridge, carrying U.S. 93 over the Snake River Canyon, is named for him, and a statue of him is outside the city's visitor center. Also named for him are an elementary school in Twin Falls and Perrine Coulee, which runs through the city and ends as a waterfall on the south rim of the canyon, west of the bridge.
