= List of bridges documented by the Historic American Engineering Record in Idaho =

Documented bridges in U.S. state

This is a list of bridges documented by the Historic American Engineering Record in the U.S. state of Idaho.

== Bridges ==
Survey No.	Name (as assigned by HAER)	Status	Type	Built	Documented	Carries	Crosses	Location	County	Coordinates
ID-1	Murtaugh Bridge	Replaced	Pratt truss	1916	1980	Murtaugh Road	Snake River	Murtaugh and Hazelton	Twin Falls and Jerome	42°29′58″N 114°09′13″W
ID-3	Twin Falls–Jerome Bridge	Replaced	Cantilever	1927	1977	US 93	Snake River	Twin Falls and Jerome	Twin Falls and Jerome	42°36′00″N 114°27′13″W
ID-4	Thatcher Bridge	Replaced	Warren truss	1910	1982	Thatcher Road	Bear River	Thatcher	Franklin	42°24′30″N 111°44′01″W
ID-5	Bonner's Ferry Bridge	Replaced	Pratt truss	1933	1980	US 2 / US 95	Kootenay River	Bonners Ferry	Boundary	48°41′59″N 116°18′48″W
ID-6	Fall River Bridge	Replaced	Howe truss	1930	1983	CCC Camp Road	Fall River	Ashton	Fremont	44°04′06″N 111°14′45″W
ID-7	Oldtown Bridge	Replaced	Parker truss	1927	1984	US 2	Pend Oreille River	Oldtown	Bonner	48°11′06″N 117°02′04″W
ID-8	Burton Road Bridge	Replaced	Pratt truss	1910	1985	SR 93879A (Burton Road)	Weiser River	Cambridge	Washington	44°32′44″N 116°39′20″W
ID-12	Hot Springs Bridge	Replaced	Pratt truss	1910	1987	Blackstone–Grasmere Road	Bruneau River	Bruneau	Owyhee	42°47′30″N 115°43′07″W
ID-13	East Dingle Bridge	Replaced	Pratt truss	1910	1987	Hunter Hill Road	Bear River	Montpelier	Bear Lake	42°13′45″N 111°14′47″W
ID-14	Midvale Bridge	Replaced	Pratt truss	1911	1986	Bridge Street	Weiser River	Midvale	Washington	44°28′14″N 116°43′56″W
ID-19	McCammon Overhead and River Crossing Bridge	Demolished	Reinforced concrete T-beam	1936	1990	I-15 BL	Portneuf River and Union Pacific Railroad	McCammon	Bannock	42°39′35″N 112°11′40″W
ID-21	Rock Creek Bridge	Replaced	Viaduct	1920	1992	SH-74 (Shoshone Street)	Rock Creek	Twin Falls	Twin Falls	42°33′02″N 114°28′37″W
ID-27-F	Arrowrock Dam, Spillway Bridge	Bypassed	Pratt truss	1915	1999	Arrowrock Dam access road	Boise River	Twin Springs	Boise	43°35′51″N 115°55′29″W
ID-32-D	Washington Water Power Company Post Falls Power Plant, Concrete Arch Bridge	Extant	Reinforced concrete open-spandrel arch	1929	1996	West 4th Avenue	Spokane River	Post Falls	Kootenai	47°42′41″N 116°57′22″W
ID-32-E	Washington Water Power Company Post Falls Power Plant, Irrigation Canal Bridge	Extant	Reinforced concrete cast-in-place slab	1930	1996	West 4th Avenue	Irrigation canal	Post Falls	Kootenai	47°42′40″N 116°57′12″W
ID-35	King Hill Bridge	Replaced	Pratt truss	1910	1998	SR 93808A (Pitchfork Road)	Snake River	King Hill	Elmore	43°00′06″N 115°12′32″W
ID-38	Blackfoot River Crossing Bridge	Replaced	Warren truss	1900	1999	North Trail Creek Road	Blackfoot River	Soda Springs	Caribou	42°46′03″N 111°26′49″W
ID-41	Camas Prairie Railroad, Second Subdivision	Extant	Trestle	1908	2002	Camas Prairie Railroad	Lawyer Creek et al.	Spalding	Nez Perce	46°12′06″N 116°25′16″W
ID-42	Clark Fork Vehicle Bridge	Bypassed	Parker truss	1919	2002	South River Road	Clark Fork River	Clark Fork	Bonner	48°08′10″N 116°10′23″W
