= Perrine Bridge =

Bridge over the Snake River in Idaho, USA

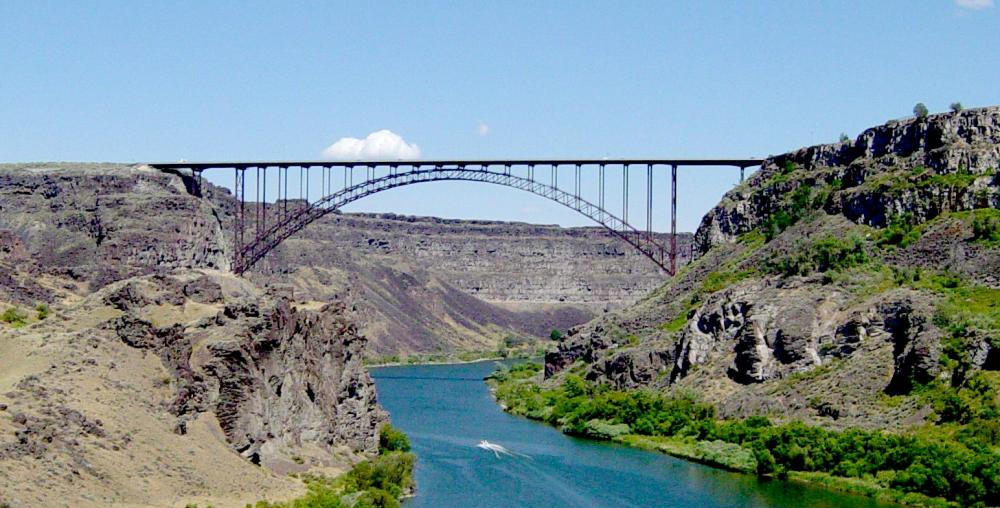
- Perrine Bridge in July 2004
- Coordinates: 42.600°N 114.4537°W
- Carries: 4 lanes of US 93
- Crosses: Snake River
- Locale: Twin Falls, Idaho, U.S.
- Official name: I. B. Perrine Bridge

Characteristics
- Total length: 1,500 feet (457 m)
- Width: 64.6 feet (19.7 m)
- Longest span: 993 feet (303 m)
- Clearance below: 486 feet (148 m)

History
- Opened: 1976; 50 years ago 1927 - original (99 years ago)

Location
- Interactive map of Perrine Bridge

Location in the United States
Location in Idaho

The I. B. Perrine Bridge is a four-lane truss arch span over the Snake River in the western United States. Located in southern Idaho just north of the city of Twin Falls, it carries U.S. Highway 93 over the Snake River Canyon, connecting Twin Falls County with Interstate 84 in Jerome County.

== Description ==
The Perrine Bridge is approximately 1,500 feet (457 m) in total length, with a main span of 993 feet (303 m). Its deck height of 486 feet (148 m) above the Snake River is the eighth highest in the United States; the elevation of the roadway is approximately 3,600 feet (1,100 m) above sea level.

The bridge is named for I. B. Perrine (1861–1943), who spearheaded the early 20th century irrigation projects in the Magic Valley region and is largely credited as the main founder of Twin Falls; a statue of Perrine is at the visitors' center at the south end of the bridge.

== History ==
Originally named the Twin Falls-Jerome Intercounty Bridge, a steel cantilever bridge was opened to traffic in September 1927, and formally dedicated by governor H. C. Baldridge on October 1, 1927. The privately financed $750,000 structure (equivalent to $10.9 million in 2024 dollars) was originally a toll bridge; the tolls were eliminated in April 1940 after the bridge was purchased by the state of Idaho for $482,000 (equivalent to $8.4 million in 2024 dollars).

By the early 1970s, the original bridge was outdated and unable to handle heavy loads and required replacement. Construction of the current bridge began in May 1973, and was completed in July 1976 at a cost of $10.56 million (equivalent to $45 million in 2024 dollars). The new bridge was dedicated on July 31, 1976; the original cantilever bridge to the west was later disassembled.

== Tourism ==
Located at the southwest end of the Perrine Bridge is the Twin Falls Visitor Center featuring souvenirs and gifts, Idaho products, visitor information, and interactive exhibits highlighting the recreational and historical activities and attractions in the region. The visitor center has views of the canyon, bridge, and access to the trail system along the canyon rim. Trails go under the bridge on either side which offers vantage points of the bridge and its structure.

To the east, along the south rim of the canyon, lies the dirt ramp used by Evel Knievel when he unsuccessfully attempted his Snake River Canyon jump on the Skycycle X-2 in September 1974; the jump failed because of a parachute malfunction. The ramp where he made the leap sits on private property about 1.6 miles (2.6 km) east of the bridge and is visible from the bridge as well as various vantage points along the Canyon Trail. A memorial to Knievel is located near the bridge; it was dedicated in September 1985, at a small ceremony attended by Knievel.

=== BASE jumping ===
The Perrine Bridge is a popular BASE jumping site known all over the world; it may be the only man-made structure in the United States where BASE jumping is allowed year-round without a permit. Jumpers often use the nearby visitor center as a home base before and after parachuting from the bridge.

The first documented and video-recorded/photographed jumps from the bridge were in 1987, by three residents of Twin Falls (former U.S. Army paratroopers) who static line jumped the bridge using military surplus MC1-1B parachutes. It was done after a test drop of a 55-gallon (210 liter) drum in a T-10 parachute harness and canopy was used. Multiple successful jumps were conducted without incident or injury.

In the early 1990s, bungee jumping and parachuting off the bridge gained popularity, but was still against the law; by the end of the decade, BASE jumping was legal. In July 2006, Dan Schilling jumped off the bridge 201 times in 21 hours to raise money for charity; Schilling was hoisted to the top of the bridge by a crane after every jump.

Eleven BASE jumpers have died while jumping from the Perrine Bridge as of 28 February 2025.

== Gallery ==
Bridge photos
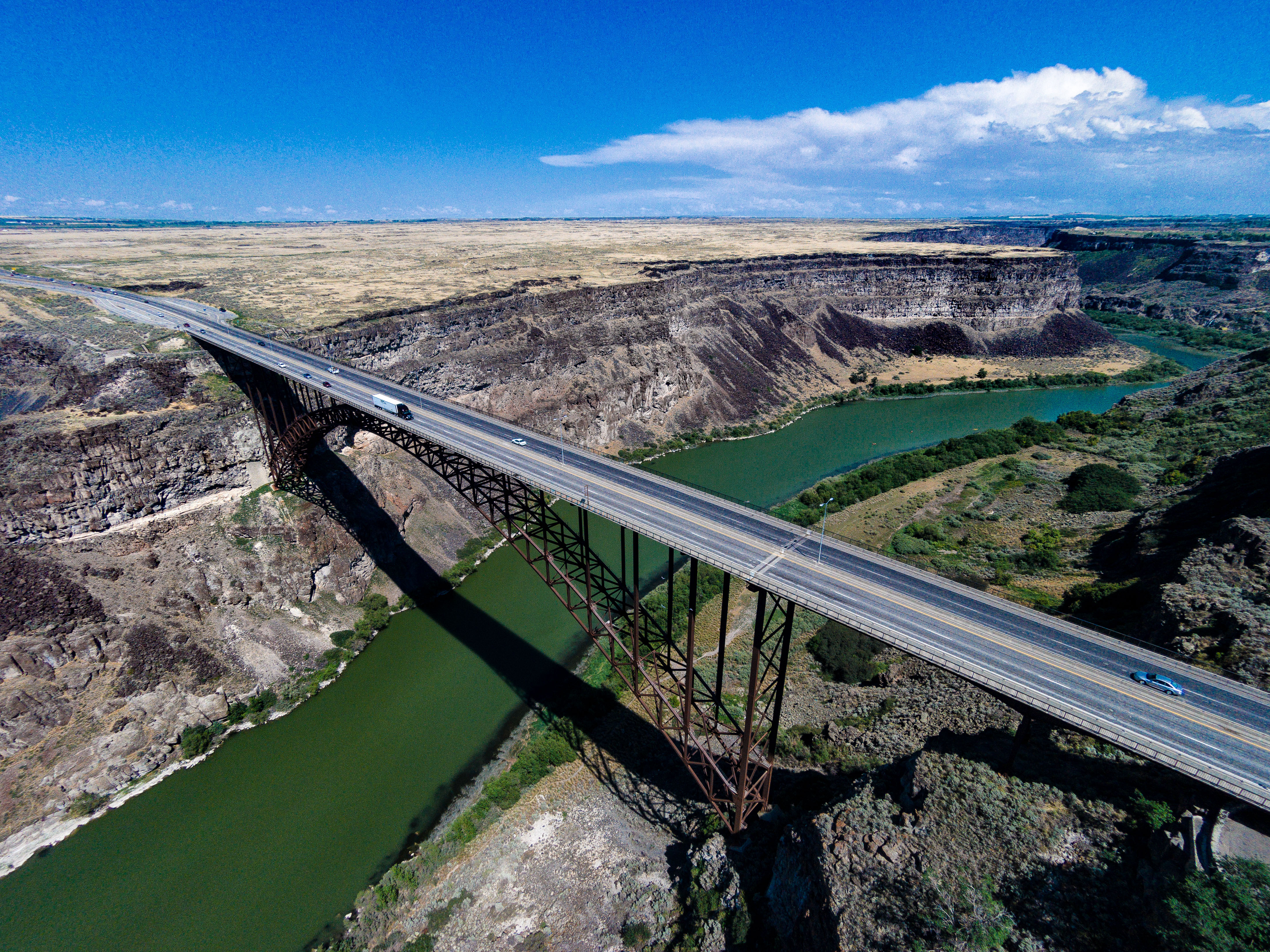
Perrine Bridge, aerial view

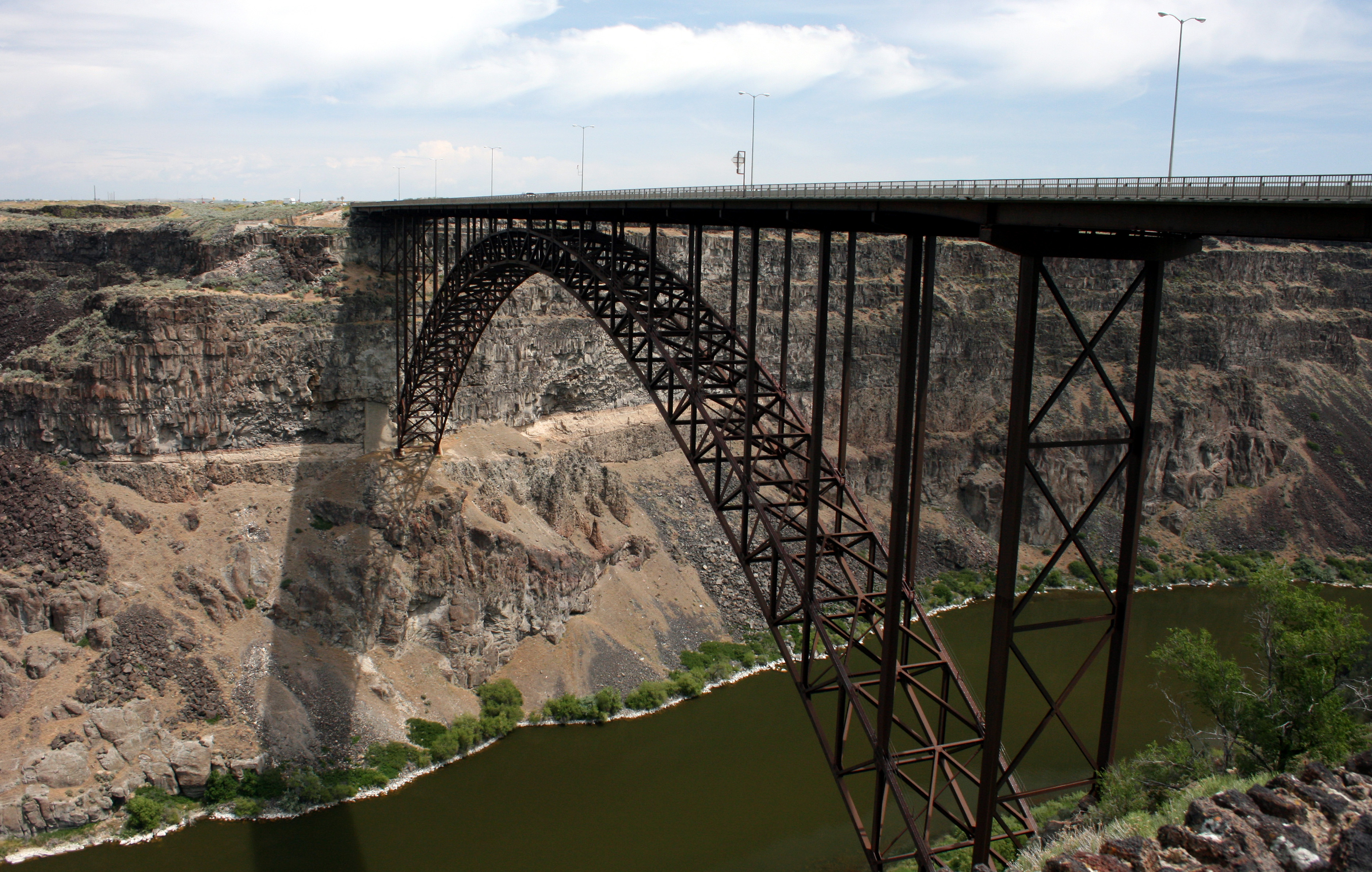
Perrine Bridge from the southwest, June 2007

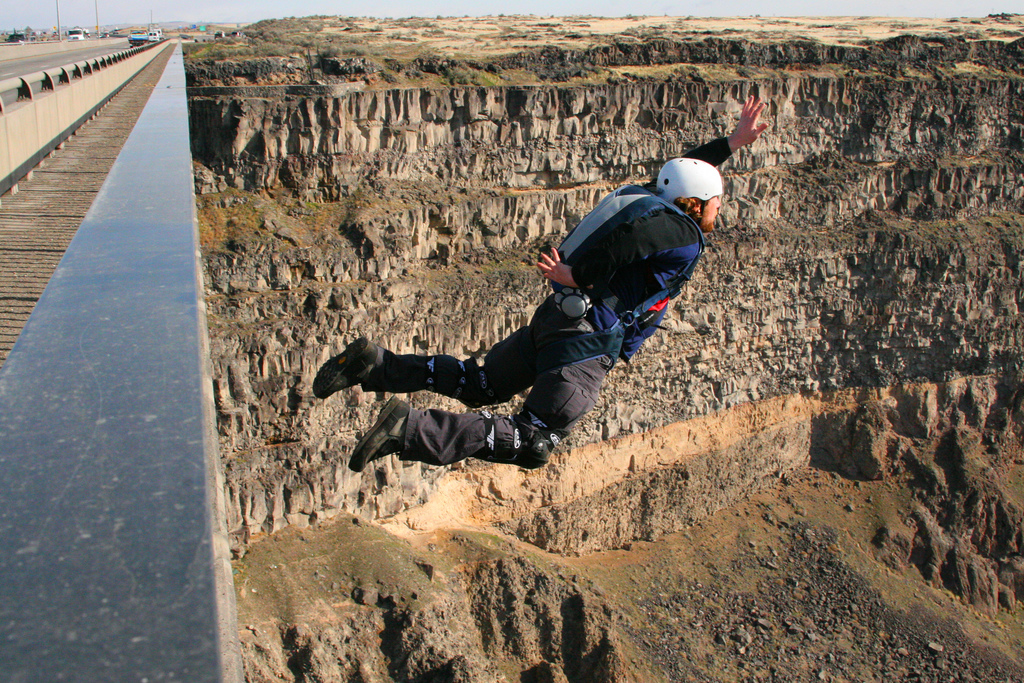
A BASE jumper leaps off the Perrine Bridge

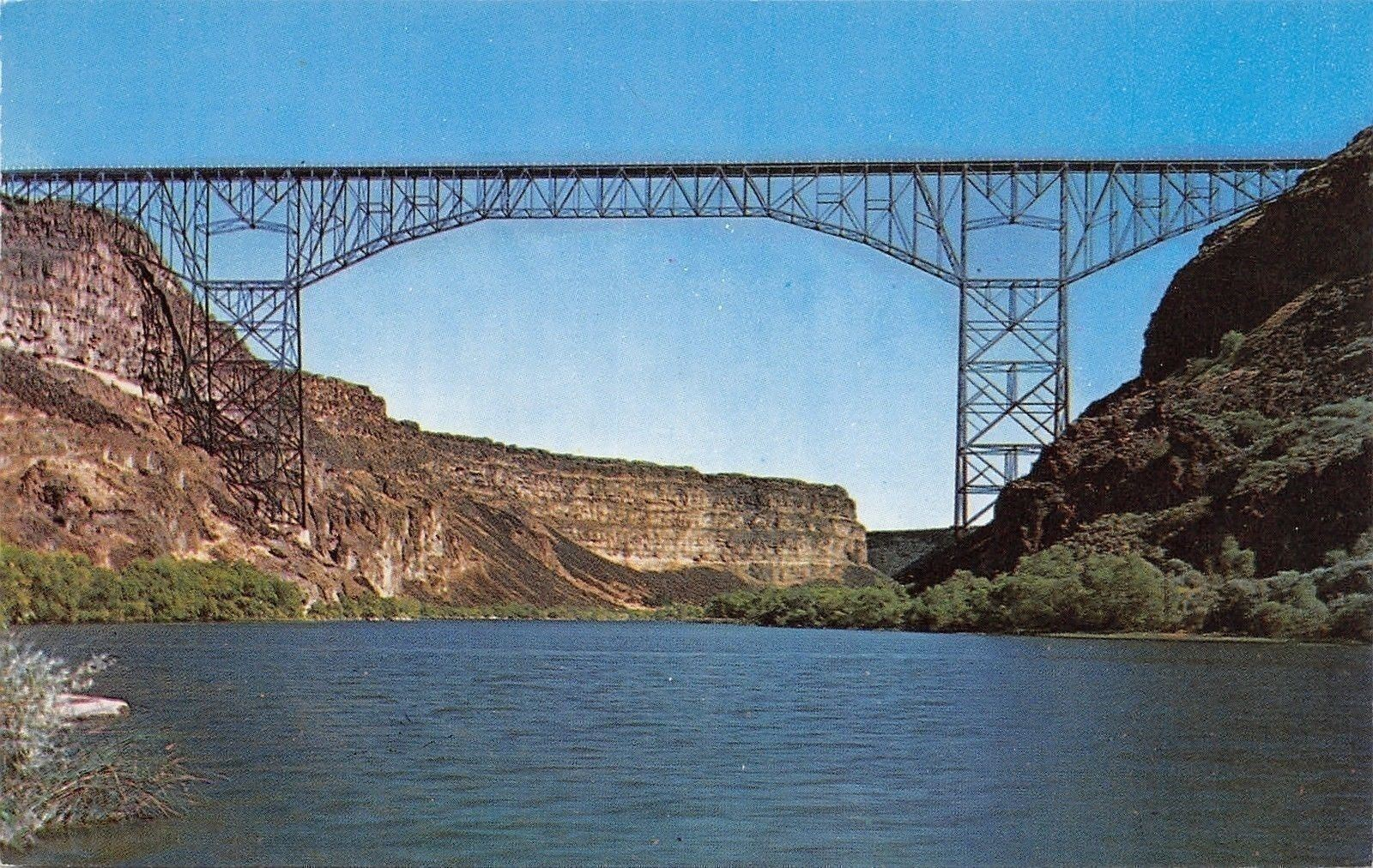
Original cantilever bridge (1927), from a 1950s postcard

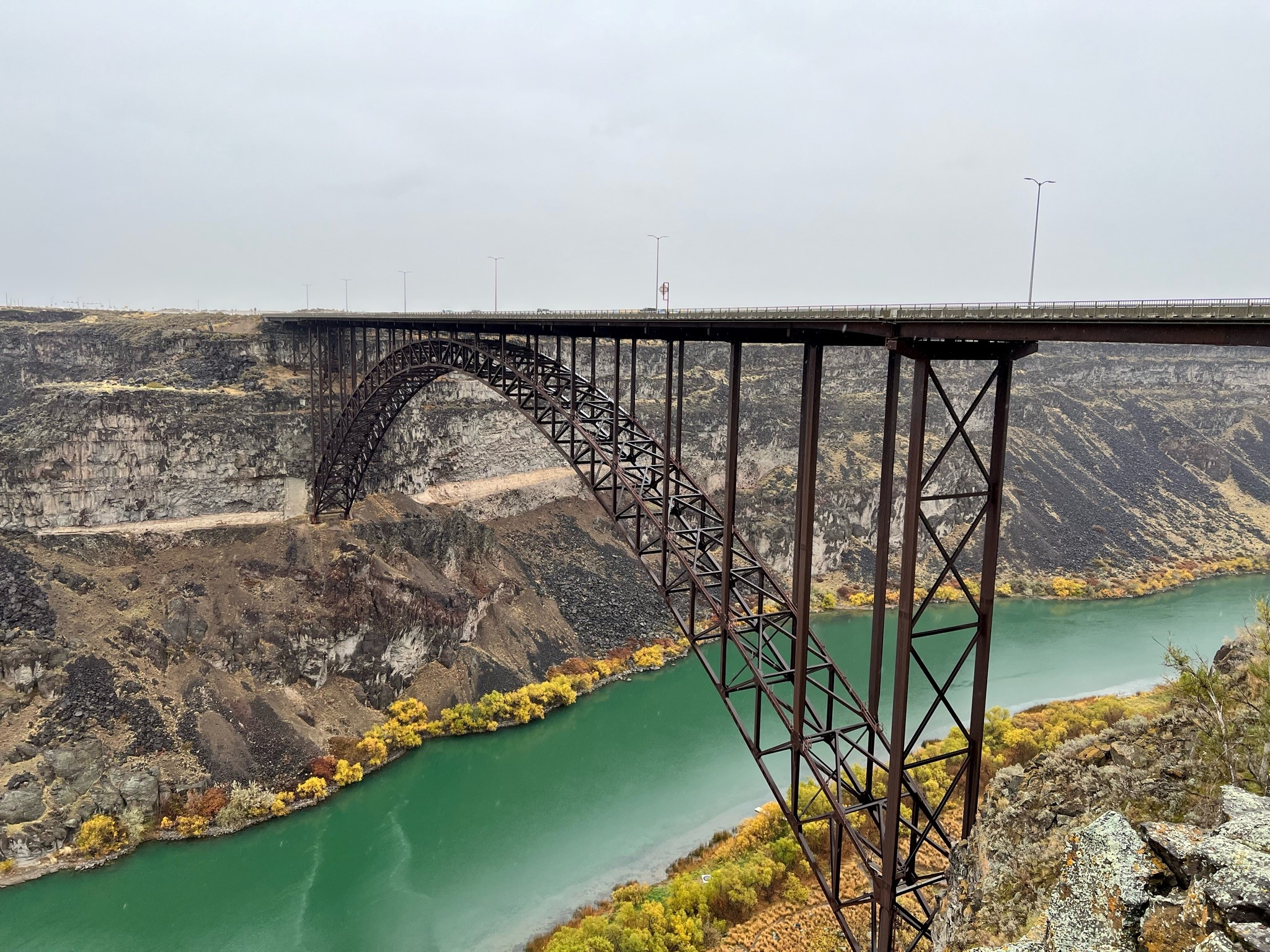
View of Perrine bridge from the visitor center, May 26, 2022

== See also ==
- List of bridges documented by the Historic American Engineering Record in Idaho
- List of bridges in the United States by height
- List of crossings of the Snake River
