= Snake River Canyon (Idaho) =

Large canyon formed by the Snake River in the Magic Valley region of southern Idaho

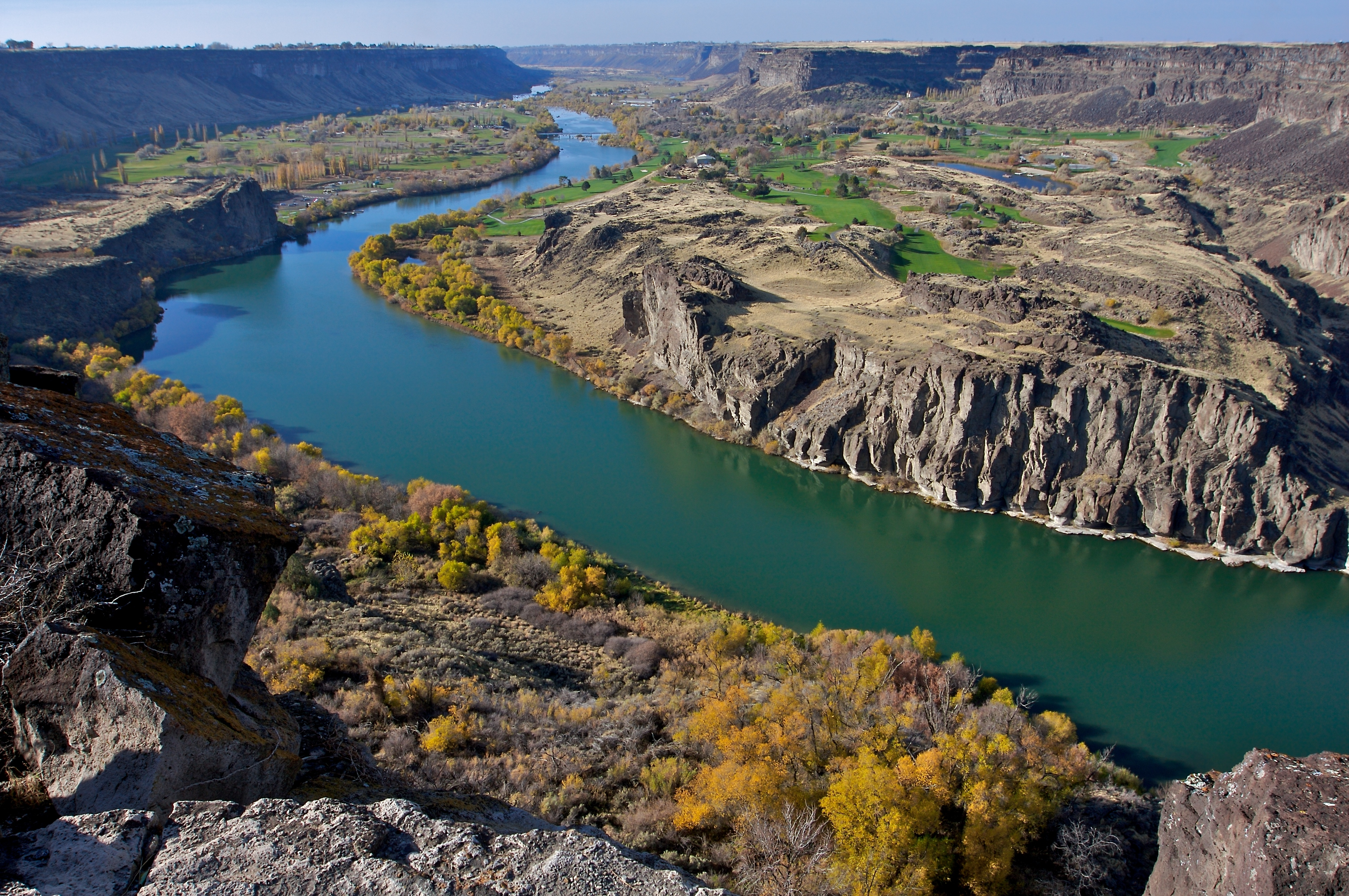
- Snake River Canyon, Idaho

- Location within Idaho

Geography
- Country: United States
- State: Idaho
- County: Twin Falls; Jerome
- Coordinates: 42°36′N 114°25′W
- River: Snake River
- Interactive map of Snake River Canyon (Idaho)

Snake River Canyon is a canyon formed by the Snake River in the Magic Valley region of southern Idaho, forming part of the boundary between Twin Falls County to the south and Jerome County to the north. The canyon ranges up to 500 feet (150 meters) deep and 0.25 miles (0.40 kilometers) wide, and runs for just over 50 miles. Perrine Bridge crosses the canyon immediately north of the city of Twin Falls; Hansen Bridge crosses the canyon to the east of Twin Falls. Shoshone Falls is located approximately 5 miles (8.0 kilometers) east of Perrine Bridge along the canyon. The canyon continues through Glenns Ferry and south of Boise, making it longer than 50 miles.

== History ==
In the late 19th century I. B. Perrine and others founded the Magic Valley's first successful agricultural operations on the Snake River Canyon floor. The canyon's value as a farming area diminished after irrigation projects made agriculture practical in the surrounding areas in the early 20th century. Today the canyon floor is a tourist attraction and features several parks and golf courses.

In the past it was generally believed the Snake River Canyon was created by a cataclysmic flood caused by water released from Lake Bonneville approximately 15,000 years ago. However, as of 2000, geologists believe that while the canyon was shaped by the flood, its basic structure predated it.

== Local fame ==
The canyon is well known as the site of an unsuccessful 1974 attempt by Evel Knievel to jump across it in the Skycycle X-2 rocket. The dirt ramp built for that jump is still there on the south rim and remains a tourist attraction (42°35′49.5″N 114°25′22.3″W), about a half-mile (0.8 km) east-southeast of Shoshone Falls.

On September 16, 2016, stuntman Eddie Braun successfully jumped the canyon using technology similar to that used by Evel Knievel 42 years previously.

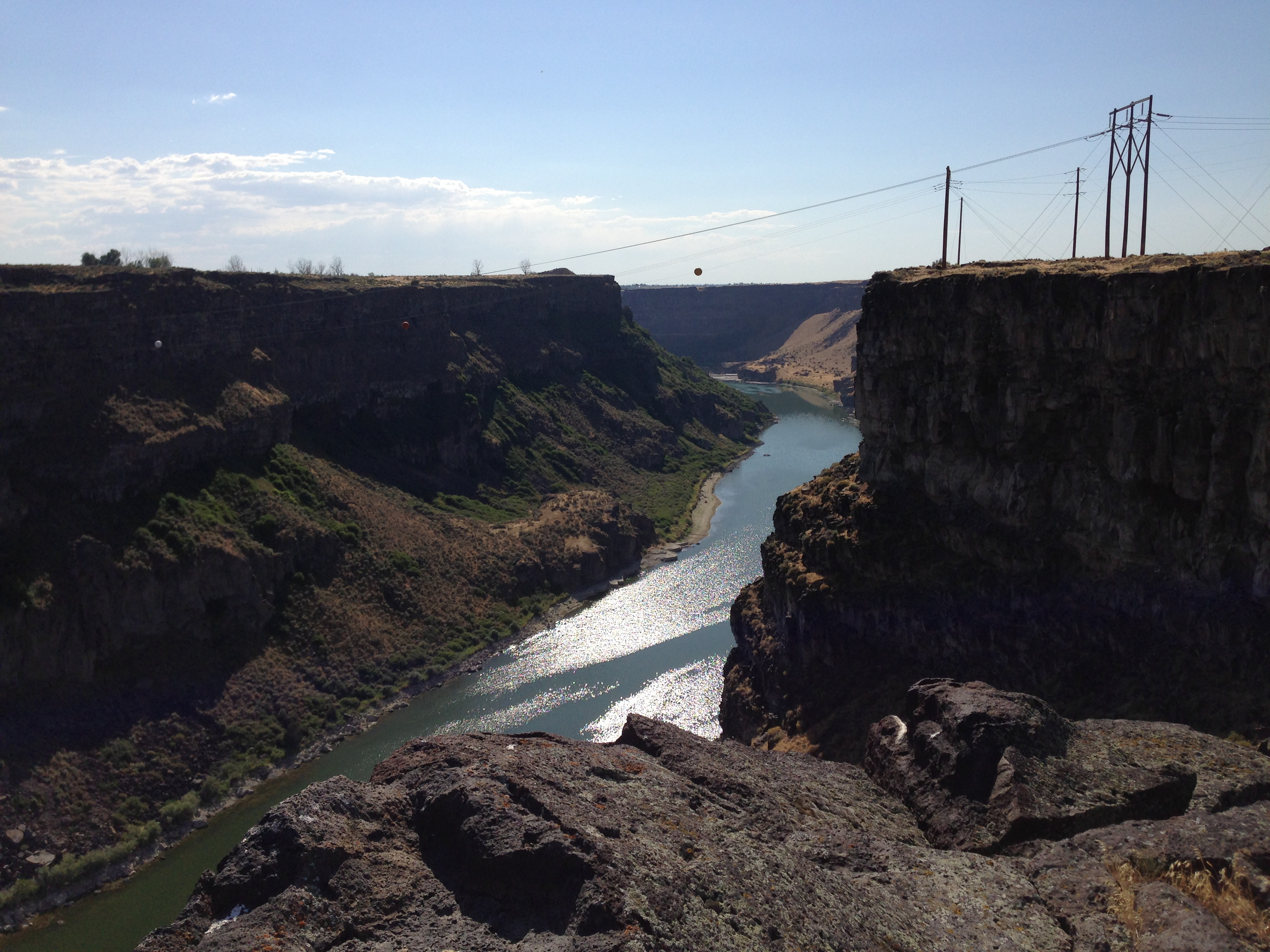
View west down the Snake River Canyon from Shoshone Falls

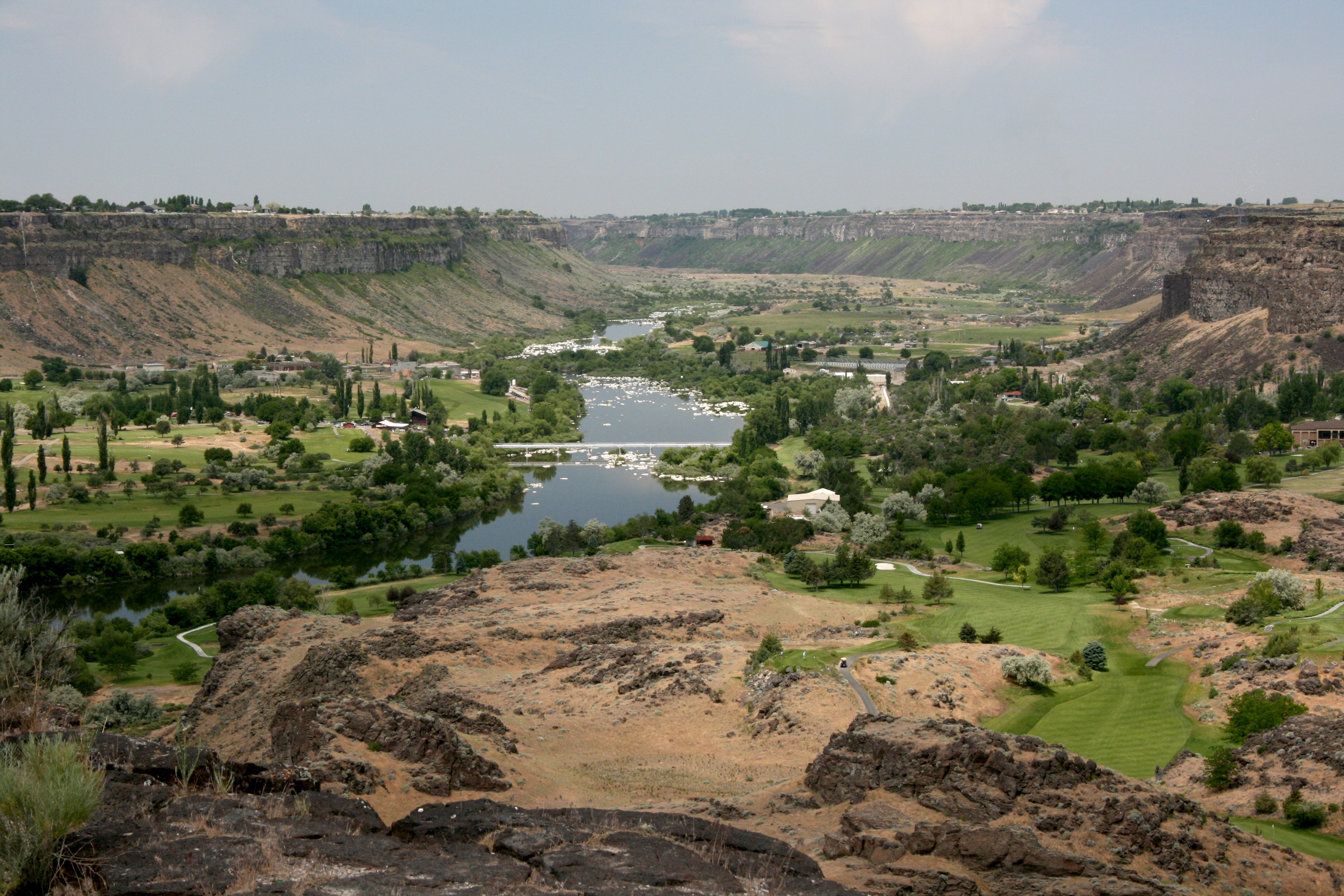
Looking west down the Snake River Canyon from the Perrine Bridge

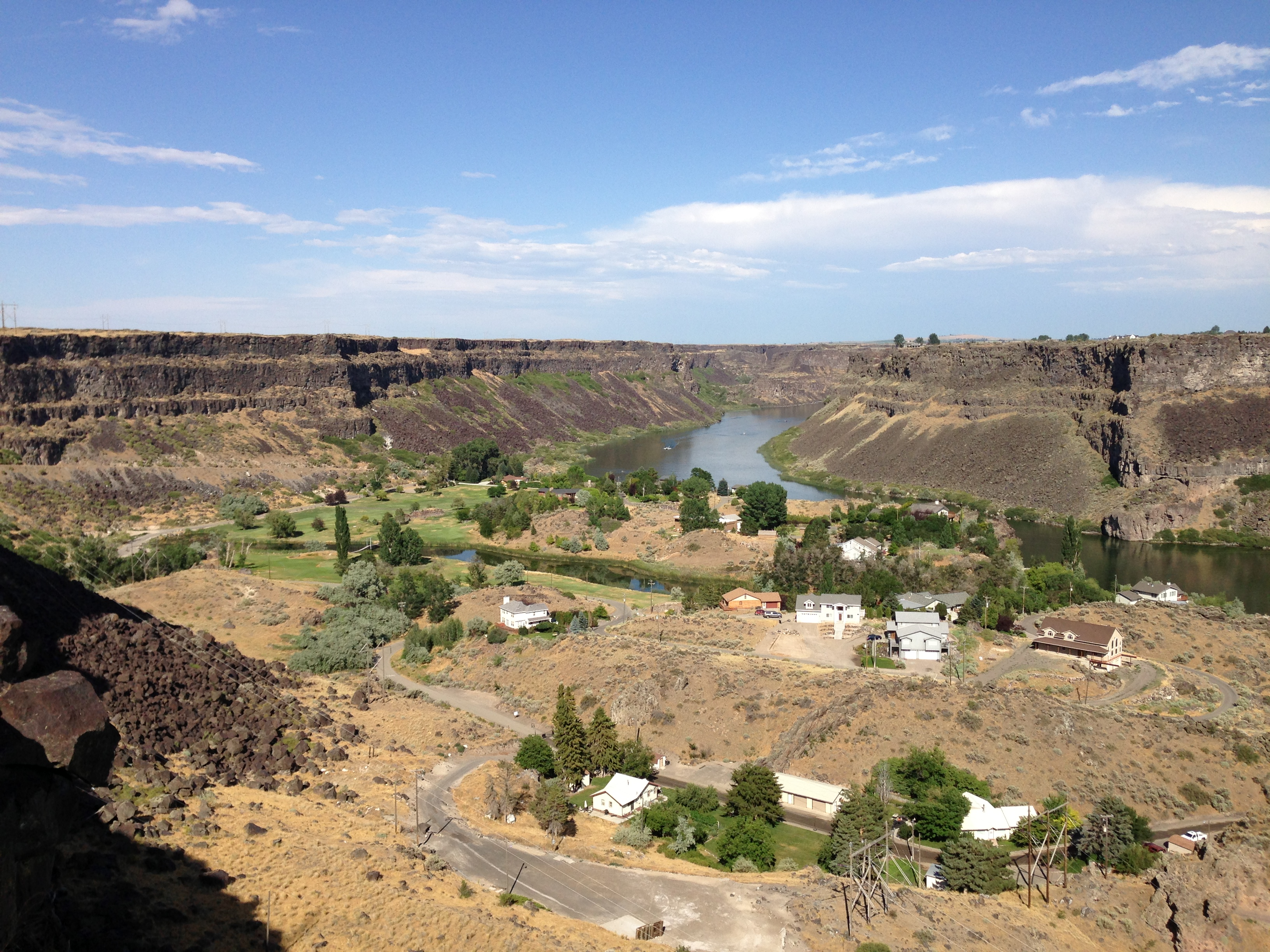
View up the Snake River Gorge above Shoshone Falls
