= The Tesla Files =

Non-fiction television series

- Genre: TV documentary
- Country of origin: United States
- Original language: English
- No. of seasons: 1
- No. of episodes: 5

Production
- Camera setup: Multiple
- Running time: 43 minutes
- Production company: Prometheus Entertainment

Original release
- Network: History
- Release: May 4 – June 1, 2018

The Tesla Files is a dramatized documentary series, broadcast in 2018 on the History Channel, based on mysteries surrounding the legacy of inventor Nikola Tesla.

== Overview ==
A team investigates mysteries involving the work of Nikola Tesla. Shortly before his death in 1943, Tesla claimed to have had 80 trunks containing details of his work, but much fewer were ever found: in the first episode, the team investigates whether there was a cover-up to suppress his work. The team also performs experiments in an attempt to validate some of Tesla's claims.

== Episodes ==
The show lasted one season consisting of five episodes on The History Channel.

=== Season 1 ===
#	Title	Original release date
1	"Without a Trace"	May 4, 2018
A team of investigators goes in search of Nikola Tesla's missing files, which were confiscated by the U.S. government after he died in New Yorker hotel room 3327 in 1943.
2	"The Colorado Experiment"	May 11, 2018
The team heads to Colorado Springs to search for the remains of Tesla's laboratory.
3	"Tesla's Tower"	May 18, 2018
The team visits Tesla's final residence, The New Yorker Hotel, with the intention of finding evidence that could prove that it served as much more than a home for Tesla.
4	"Secret Weapons"	May 25, 2018
Evidence is found that proves the U.S. military wanted Tesla's secret files as well as a possible link between Tesla's last patent and one of the Air Force's most advanced aircraft.
5	"Fowl Play"	June 1, 2018
The team follows the trail back to New York, where they discover traces of a shadow government bent on keeping Nikola Tesla's files secret.
