= Rocket City Rednecks =

Television series

- Starring: Travis Taylor; Rog Jones; Charles Taylor; Michael Taylor; Pete Erbach
- Narrated by: Travis Taylor
- Country of origin: United States
- Original language: English
- No. of seasons: 2
- No. of episodes: 36

Production
- Production company: Flight 33 Productions

Original release
- Network: National Geographic Channel
- Release: September 28, 2011 – January 17, 2013

Rocket City Rednecks is an American television show that focuses on engineering. The show is set in Huntsville, Alabama, (known as "Rocket City" for its historic contributions to the American space program), and features Travis Taylor, three of his relatives, and his best friend. All five cast members are highly educated (Travis holds multiple Ph.D. degrees and his brother-in-law also holds a Ph.D.) but, when not working on technical matters, play the part of stereotypical "rednecks" and use their advanced knowledge to solve "real world" problems (such as creating a rocket that uses moonshine as fuel).

The show was first broadcast on Wednesday September 28, 2011, with Tim Evans as the supervising producer. It is broadcast on the National Geographic Channel, and will be shown in all regions of the United States.

== Cast ==
- Travis Taylor, Ph.D. aka "The Ringleader"
- Rog Jones aka "The Sidekick" (Travis' long-time best friend)
- Charles "Daddy" Taylor (Travis' father)
- Michael "The Kid" Taylor (Travis' nephew)
- "Pistol Pete" Erbach, Ph.D. (Travis' brother-in-law)

== Format ==
A typical episode features the five main cast members and possibly the addition of an expert in the field related to the particular challenge of that show. The challenges are varied, usually involving constructing a machine to achieve a particular objective. Examples of challenges include making a mechanical "ironman" suit, a submarine, a spy satellite, and a machine to fling a frozen watermelon to simulate an asteroid collision with the southern United States.

== Episodes ==
=== Series overview ===
Season	Episodes	Originally released	
Season	Episodes	First released	Last released
1	20	September 28, 2011	December 7, 2011
2	16	November 29, 2012	January 17, 2013

=== Season 1 (2011) ===
No. overall	No. in season	Title	Original release date
1	1	"Bomb-Proof My Pick-Up"	September 28, 2011
2	2	"Moonshine Rocket Fuel"	September 28, 2011
3	3	"Junkyard Iron Man"	September 28, 2011
4	4	"20,000 Kegs Under the Sea"	September 28, 2011
5	5	"Hillbilly Armageddon"	October 5, 2011
6	6	"Rednecks on the Red Planet"	October 5, 2011
7	7	"Close Encounters of the Redneck Kind"	October 12, 2011
8	8	"Backwoods Spy Satellite"	October 12, 2011
9	9	"Power My Party Boat"	October 26, 2011
10	10	"Double-Barreled Rocket"	October 26, 2011
11	11	"Hillbilly Moon Buggy"	November 2, 2011
12	12	"Rocket-Powered Bass Boat"	November 2, 2011
13	13	"Tornado-Proof Outhouse"	November 16, 2011
14	14	"Hillbilly Fireworks"	November 16, 2011
15	15	"The War Wagon"	November 23, 2011
16	16	"Trailer Power"	November 23, 2011
17	17	"Slingshot Into Orbit"	November 30, 2011
18	18	"Hillbilly Hovercraft"	November 30, 2011
19	19	"Radar-Proof Pickup"	December 7, 2011
20	20	"Talladega Tailgate"	December 7, 2011

=== Season 2 (2012–13) ===
No. overall	No. in season	Title	Original release date
21	1	"Alabama Blast-Off"	November 29, 2012
22	2	"Jay Leno's Steam Racer"	November 29, 2012
23	3	"Down Home Demolition"	December 6, 2012
24	4	"Tsunami Survival Pod"	December 6, 2012
25	5	"Rocket-Powered Pickup"	December 13, 2012
26	6	"Superhero Super Suit"	December 13, 2012
27	7	"Remote Control Demolition Derby"	December 20, 2012
28	8	"DIY Death Ray"	December 20, 2012
29	9	"Hunting with a Hero"	December 27, 2012
30	10	"One-Man Helicopter"	December 27, 2012
31	11	"Sweet Drone Alabama"	January 3, 2013
32	12	"Papa John's Pizza Bike"	January 3, 2013
33	13	"All-Terrain Transformer"	January 10, 2013
34	14	"Lightning Gun"	January 10, 2013
35	15	"Doomsday Shelter"	January 17, 2013
36	16	"Full-Body Flak Jacket"	January 17, 2013
