= List of The Tonight Show Starring Johnny Carson episodes (1988) =

Episodes in 1988

- No. of episodes: 132

Release
- Original network: NBC

Season chronology
- ← Previous; 1987 episodes Next → 1989 episodes

The following is a list of episodes of the television series The Tonight Show Starring Johnny Carson which aired in 1988. In October, 1962 Johnny Carson took over as host of the show from the previous host Jack Paar.

== 1988 ==
=== January ===
No.	Original release date	Guest(s)	Musical/entertainment guest(s)
3,767	January 4, 1988	Jay Leno (guest host), Lance Burton, Baxter Black	Rita Moreno
3,768	January 6, 1988	Franklyn Ajaye, Jester Hairston	Belinda Carlisle
Motivations to Lose Weight After the Holidays
3,769	January 7, 1988	Bette Davis, Martin Short	N/A
Special Calendars
3,770	January 8, 1988	Mark & Delia Owens	Robert Goulet
Questions from The Audience
3,771	January 11, 1988	Jay Leno (guest host), Dan Aykroyd, Nigel Havers	Gloria Estefan and Miami Sound Machine
Headlines
3,772	January 13, 1988	Whoopi Goldberg, Jerry Seinfeld	The Chieftains ("Dans Mod Koh A Vaod" and "Full Of Joy")
How Americans Slogans Translate In Foreign Countries
3,773	January 14, 1988	Milton Berle, Carol Siskind, Don Yesso	N/A
Public Service Announcements
3,774	January 15, 1988	Lisa Jane Persky	Buster Poindexter ("Hot, Hot, Hot", "Somebody Buy Me A Drink")
A videotape of Johnny trying his jokes out on shoe-shine man Floyd Jackson, security guard Eddie Murphy, and commissary worker Wyn Hoonahan while they sit at Floyd's stand.
3,775	January 18, 1988	Jay Leno (guest host), Jimmie Walker, Deborah Raffin, Roy Blount, Jr.	N/A
Notes from a Church Bulletin
3,776	January 20, 1988	Howard Cosell	Barry Manilow
3,777	January 21, 1988	Jack Lemmon	K.T. Oslin
Mighty Carson Art Players - "Malibu Restaurant" (rerun from Betty White episode)
3,778	January 22, 1988	Jim Fowler, Teresa Ganzel, Bob Nelson	N/A
Mighty Carson Art Players - "Tea Time Movie"

=== February ===
No.	Original release date	Guest(s)	Musical/entertainment guest(s)
3,779	February 2, 1988	Paul Reiser	James Taylor
Emergency backup statistics not used but ready for use at football games by the sports announcers covering them.
3,780	February 3, 1988	Betty White, Merritt Heaton	Ray Stevens
Mighty Carson Art Players - "Breakfast at The Rather Household"
3,781	February 4, 1988	Sammy Davis, Jr, Jason Bateman	N/A
Johnny's mock eulogy of Luicci the Capuccino Monkey
3,782	February 5, 1988	Oprah Winfrey, Sydney Walsh	Daniel Rosen
Backup 'Wheaties' Box Covers
3,783	February 10, 1988	Jay Leno (guest host), Sandy Duncan	Randy Travis
Headlines; Kid Inventors
3,784	February 11, 1988	Jay Leno (guest host), Tim Reid, Tom Parks, Dr. David Dahl	Jerry Lee Lewis ("Rockin' My Life Away" and "Great Balls of Fire")
3,785	February 12, 1988	Jay Leno (guest host), Brooke Adams, Kevin Meaney, Carl Weathers	Glen Campbell ("I Remember You")
3,786	February 16, 1988	Tim Conway	Jonathan Butler
Diary of Things Johnny Did While He Was Sick
3,787	February 17, 1988	Jackie Mason, Joanna Kerns	Kid Creole & The Coconuts ("Dropout", "Curiosity")
USA Today Poll About the Sexes
3,788	February 18, 1988	Dudley Moore, Minnie Black	N/A
A Presidential Debate with Questions asked by Johnny.
3,789	February 19, 1988	Gene Siskel, Roger Ebert, Bob Saget	Los Lobos ("In America", "La Bamba")
Forgotten Movies From the Past
3,790	February 23, 1988	Louie Anderson, Jennifer Tilly	Dionne Warwick
3,791	February 24, 1988	Ritch Shydner, Rita Rudner, Fred Roggin, Darryl Sivad	N/A
Questions From the Audience
3,792	February 25, 1988	Burt Reynolds, Teresa Ganzel, Eddie "The Eagle" Edwards	N/A
Mighty Carson Art Players - "Tele-Scam"; Expensive Props
3,793	February 26, 1988	Garry Shandling, Allyce Beasley	Donna Theodore
The Wheel of Candidates

=== March ===
No.	Original release date	Guest(s)	Musical/entertainment guest(s)
3,794	March 7, 1988	Jay Leno (guest host), Super Dave Osborne	Ben Vereen
Headlines

=== May ===
No.	Original release date	Guest(s)	Musical/entertainment guest(s)
3,795	May 11, 1988	Joe Piscopo, Bill Toone	N/A
3,796	May 12, 1988	Dana Carvey, Joe Garagiola, David Teitelbaum, Jack Saltzberg	N/A
Carnac the Magnificent
3,797	May 13, 1988	Fred de Cordova, Bob Hope	k.d. lang
3,798	May 18, 1988	Bill Kirchenbauer, Dr. Terry Gosliner	Billy Vera & The Beaters
Blue Cards
3,799	May 19, 1988	Jonathan Winters, Kristin Banerjee	N/A
Audience Questionnaire
3,800	May 20, 1988	Sylvester Stallone	N/A
Stump the Band
3,801	May 25, 1988	Paul Hogan, David Brenner	Linda Hopkins ("Born on Friday")
Direct Response Commercials, the 'Playette' and the 'Jog'r'.
3,802	May 26, 1988	Chevy Chase, Iditarod racer John Suter, Thalassa Cruso	N/A
3,803	May 27, 1988	James Stewart, Fred Roggin	Leonard Waxdeck & The Birdcallers
Johnny provides evidence that Bonzo the famous chimpanzee is really still alive.
3,804	May 30, 1988	Garry Shandling (guest host), Elizabeth Perkins, Bob Saget	Jimmy Buffett
3,805	May 31, 1988	Garry Shandling (guest host)	Harry Connick, Jr.

=== June ===
No.	Original release date	Guest(s)	Musical/entertainment guest(s)
3,806	June 1, 1988	Garry Shandling (guest host), Paula Poundstone	Natalie Cole
Comparison of Photos between Reagan at the Kremlin and a family at Disneyland.
3,807	June 2, 1988	Garry Shandling (guest host), Angie Dickinson, Fritz Coleman, Allyce Beasley	Michael Bolton
3,808	June 3, 1988	Garry Shandling (guest host), Stan Kann, Joanna Kerns, Roy Blount, Jr.	N/A
3,809	June 6, 1988	Jay Leno (guest host), Marilu Henner, Cathy Guisewite	N/A
Headlines
3,810	June 8, 1988	David Brinkley	Chuck Berry
3,811	June 9, 1988	Arnold Schwarzenegger, Jerry Seinfeld, Andre Agassi	N/A
Jokes That Are Sent In By Viewers During the Writers Strike
3,812	June 10, 1988	Don Yesso	Basia
3,813	June 13, 1988	Jay Leno (guest host), Vincent Price, Dave Barry	N/A
Jay shows a film clip of his adventure with the Blue Angels.
3,814	June 15, 1988	James Belushi	Julio Iglesias
Commencement Address to The Audience
3,815	June 16, 1988	Bill Cosby, William Ennis	Belinda Carlisle ("Circle in the Sand")
3,816	June 17, 1988	David Steinberg	Andrea Marcovicci
Blue Cards
3,817	June 20, 1988	Jay Leno (guest host), Joan Embery, Marsha Warfield, Dr. Joyce Brothers	N/A
Jay reads unusual newspaper clippings.
3,818	June 22, 1988	Jay Leno, Raquel Welch, garbage truck driver Ray Anderson	N/A
Johnny comments on the Lakers repeating as NBA champions
3,819	June 23, 1988	Magic Johnson, Bruce Willis	Johnny Frigo
Rules of Thumb
3,820	June 24, 1988	Dudley Moore, Lottie Hicks	Diane Schuur
Extracurricular Activities from Celebrity's High School Yearbooks
3,821	June 27, 1988	Jay Leno (guest host), Dennis Miller, Erma Bombeck	Little Richard
Headlines
3,822	June 28, 1988	Jay Leno (guest host), Steve Allen, Super Dave Osborne, Bill Maher	N/A
3,823	June 29, 1988	Jay Leno (guest host), Charles Fleischer, Sydney Walsh, Frank Zappa	N/A
3,824	June 30, 1988	Jay Leno (guest host), Sammy Davis, Jr., Connie Chung	N/A
Stamps by Mail

=== July ===
No.	Original release date	Guest(s)	Musical/entertainment guest(s)
3,825	July 1, 1988	Jay Leno (guest host), Stepfanie Kramer, Kevin Pollak, Michael Warren	N/A
Jay has a satellite interview with President Reagan.
3,826	July 18, 1988	Jay Leno (guest host), Pee Wee Herman, John Cleese, Malcolm Forbes	N/A
Headlines
3,827	July 20, 1988	Joe King, Yakov Smirnoff	Buster Poindexter
Photos of Famous Political People with Insertions of What They May Be Saying
3,828	July 21, 1988	Arsenio Hall	Hall & Oates ("Missing Each Other", "She's A Monster")
The Tonight Show version of The Democratic Convention (audience members as the delegates)
3,829	July 22, 1988	Tom Hanks, Brian Gillis	Michael Davis
3,830	July 25, 1988	Jay Leno (guest host), Jamie Lee Curtis, Louie Anderson	Johnny Mathis
3,831	July 27, 1988	John Larroquette, John Bogosian	Rosemary Clooney
A satellite interview with the 'still alive' Elvis Presley in a cabin in North Dakota. This Elvis is known as Ron Stein.
3,832	July 28, 1988	Governor Bill Clinton	Joe Cocker
A film clip of the youngest pilot.
3,833	July 29, 1988	Michael Landon, Smokey Tennison	k.d. lang
Celebrity Photos

=== August ===
No.	Original release date	Guest(s)	Musical/entertainment guest(s)
3,834	August 1, 1988	Jay Leno (guest host), Chuck Norris, Joan Van Ark, Abigail Van Buren	Oak Ridge Boys
3,835	August 3, 1988	Bill Murray, Jeff Cesario	Nadja Salerno-Sonnenberg
Psychic Predictions
3,836	August 4, 1988	Paul Reiser, Mabel Hines Buck	Robben Ford
3,837	August 5, 1988	Richard Pryor, Richard Jeni	Pete Fountain
Photos of celebrities showing tiny notes on their person supposedly enlarged by 'high resolution cameras'.
3,838	August 8, 1988	Garry Shandling (guest host), Phoebe Mills, Ed Begley, Jr., Richard Lewis	Dizzy Gillespie
3,839	August 9, 1988	Garry Shandling (guest host), Sugar Ray Leonard, Bill Maher, Patti D'Arbanville	N/A
3,840	August 10, 1988	Garry Shandling (guest host), Joan Embery, David Steinberg, Catherine O'Hara	Linda Hopkins
3,841	August 11, 1988	Garry Shandling (guest host), Tracey Ullman, Ken Olin, Fred Roggin	Brenda Russell
3,842	August 12, 1988	Garry Shandling (guest host), Kirstie Alley, Mariel Hemingway, Cathy Guisewite; Garry Shandling's final episode as guest host.	N/A
The Lobster Boy Letter
3,843	August 22, 1988	Jay Leno (guest host), Shirley Jones, Wayne Gretzky; Jay Leno becomes permanent guest host as of this episode; no other guest hosts were used between now and the end of the show's run.	B.B. King
Headlines
3,844	August 24, 1988	George Carlin, Mark Harmon	N/A
The Tonight Show version of the Republican Convention (audience members as the delegates)
3,845	August 25, 1988	Jonathan Winters, Karen Josephson, Sarah Josephson	N/A
Phobias
3,846	August 29, 1988	Jay Leno (guest host), Holly Robinson	Dwight Yoakam & Buck Owens
Headlines
3,847	August 31, 1988	Kirk Douglas, Ritch Shydner	The Temptations
Examples of Contemporary Slang

=== September ===
No.	Original release date	Guest(s)	Musical/entertainment guest(s)
3,848	September 1, 1988	Buddy Hackett, Dana Delany	N/A
Albums Sung by Celebrities in The Past
3,849	September 2, 1988	Jennifer Tilly	Randy Travis
Comedy Crypt - Some Old Jokes
3,850	September 5, 1988	Jay Leno (guest host), Norm Crosby	George Benson
The Tonight Show's Little Big Book of Romantic Phrases
3,851	September 7, 1988	Bob Hope, Tim Conway	Joe Williams
Low-Down On The Candidates
3,852	September 8, 1988	Martin Short	Johnny Clegg & Savuka
Different Sounds That Give People the Willies
3,853	September 9, 1988	Shabana Kazi	Harry Belafonte
International Symbols
3,854	September 12, 1988	Jay Leno (guest host), Betty White, Elvira	The Spinners
Newspaper Clippings
3,855	September 14, 1988	Jim Fowler	N/A
3,856	September 15, 1988	Bob Uecker, Sigourney Weaver	Reba McEntire
New Fall Shows

=== October ===
No.	Original release date	Guest(s)	Musical/entertainment guest(s)
3,857	October 6, 1988	David Letterman, Jay Leno, Garry Shandling	N/A
26th Anniversary Show
3,858	October 10, 1988	Jay Leno (guest host), Robert Stack, Franklyn Ajaye	Kenny G
3,859	October 12, 1988	Cody Carr	Ray Charles
A takeoff on the Presidential Debate in which Ed McMahon asks Johnny questions as if Johnny is Quayle or Bentsen.
3,860	October 13, 1988	Tommy Lasorda	Jimmy Buffett
3,861	October 14, 1988	Sandy Duncan, Steve Mittleman, Irv Kupcinet	N/A
Personalized License Plates
3,862	October 17, 1988	Jay Leno (guest host), Super Dave Osborne, Robert Mitchum	N/A
Headlines
3,863	October 19, 1988	Whoopi Goldberg, Kevin Pollak, Alice Chalifoux	N/A
Answers to the Questionnaire passed out to 2nd and 3rd Graders based on the Presidential Election
3,864	October 20, 1988	Michael Caine	Eydie Gormé, Steve Lawrence
Blue Cards
3,865	October 21, 1988	Orel Hershiser, Floyd Jackson, Susan Sullivan	Lee Ritenour
3,866	October 31, 1988	Jay Leno (guest host), Stepfanie Kramer, Jimmie Walker, Richard Mulligan	N/A

=== November ===
No.	Original release date	Guest(s)	Musical/entertainment guest(s)
3,867	November 2, 1988	Christopher Reeve, Melanie Mayron, Jonathan Zachary	N/A
'If Election Was Held Tomorrow' Quiz; Local Propositions
3,868	November 3, 1988	Michael J. Fox, Larry Miller, Harry Lorayne	N/A
Funny Advertising Ads: Johnny and Ed present mash-ups of billboard slogans
3,869	November 4, 1988	James Garner, Jeff Cesario, Park Overall	N/A
'Politicboy' Magazine
3,870	November 7, 1988	Jay Leno (guest host), Marilu Henner, Jester Hairston, Vanna White	N/A
Headlines (11/8/88 pre-empted for NBC News election night coverage)
3,871	November 9, 1988	Candice Bergen, Steven Wright	Johnny Frigo
As The White House Turns
3,872	November 10, 1988	Greg Irwin, Richard Jeni, Gore Vidal	N/A
Blue Cards
3,873	November 11, 1988	Paul Reiser, Kitty Carlisle	Oak Ridge Boys
Cultural Customs of The World
3,874	November 14, 1988	Jay Leno (guest host), Joan Collins, John Byner	N/A
Newspaper Clippings
3,875	November 16, 1988	Harry Anderson, Argus Hamilton, Calvin Trillin	N/A
Messages From Home
3,876	November 17, 1988	Bob Newhart, David Horowitz	N/A
Letters from Viewers Who Didn't Want Credit Cards But Got Them Away; Off The Wall Video Tapes On The Market Today
3,877	November 18, 1988	Oprah Winfrey	Sheena Easton ("The Lover In Me" and "Follow My Rainbow")
Sketch - "UCLA vs. Stanford Game (with Johnny as a commentator)"
3,878	November 21, 1988	Jay Leno (guest host), Tony Danza, Malcolm-Jamal Warner	Andy Williams
Tonight Show's Little Big Book of Romantic Phrases
3,879	November 23, 1988	George Burns, Tracey Ullman	Jeff Healey ("See The Light")
School Kids' Answers To a Thanksgiving Questionnaire.
3,880	November 24, 1988	Lucy Webb	Willie Nelson
Evening News with Zontar Rather in The Year 2008
3,881	November 25, 1988	Teri Garr, Marsha Warfield	Johnny Clegg & Savuka
Celebrity Perfumes
3,882	November 28, 1988	Jay Leno (guest host), Barbara Walters, Joanna Kerns	Stanley Jordan
Jay's High School Reunion
3,883	November 29, 1988	Jay Leno (guest host), Mary Tyler Moore, James Earl Jones	Debbie Allen
Actual Notes That Parents Wrote to Schools to Excuse their Children From Class
3,884	November 30, 1988	Jay Leno (guest host), Harvey Fierstein, Courteney Cox	K.T. Oslin
Headlines

=== December ===
No.	Original release date	Guest(s)	Musical/entertainment guest(s)
3,885	December 1, 1988	Jay Leno (guest host), Fred Savage, Joan Van Ark	Los Lobos
3,886	December 2, 1988	Jay Leno (guest host), Larry Miller, Stephen Collins	Phil Collins ("Groovy Kind Of Love" and "Separate Lives")
Games
3,887	December 5, 1988	Jay Leno (guest host), Kirk Douglas, Paula Poundstone, Eva Marie Saint	Linda Hopkins
3,888	December 7, 1988	Carl Reiner, Zota Croughan	N/A
Titles For Some Christmas Specials
3,889	December 8, 1988	Jonathan Winters	Kenny Loggins ("Footloose", "A Lesson Hard To Learn")
Johnny puts on a Christmas Helmet that was sent in.; Blue Cards
3,890	December 9, 1988	Danny DeVito, Richard Benjamin	N/A
Johnny determines whether the audience is on the Naughty or Nice list; Also explains the Santa Ana winds.
3,891	December 12, 1988	Jay Leno (guest host), Pee Wee Herman, Ricardo Montalbán, Ritch Shydner	Lou Rawls
3,892	December 14, 1988	Steve Martin, Helen Shaver, Steve Jenne	N/A
Actual Children's Letters to Santa Claus
3,893	December 15, 1988	Bob Hope, Jimmy Tingle, Ellen Greene	N/A
Photos of Supposed Relatives of Audience Members and The Strange Things They Have Done
3,894	December 16, 1988	Arnold Schwarzenegger	Bette Midler ("Under the Boardwalk" and "I Think It's Gonna Rain Today")
Fred de Cordova wears a moose hat called 'Chris Moose'.; New Products
3,895	December 26, 1988	Jay Leno (guest host), Brice Beckham, Joey Bishop, Louie Anderson	Dwight Yoakam
Jay ran into Chuck Norris at a store and saw he bought his wife an electronic automatic dog grooming brush for Xmas. He telephones Mrs. Norris to see if she really liked this Xmas present.; Psychic Predictions for Next Year
3,896	December 28, 1988	'Poppa John' Venturello, Franklyn Ajaye, Catherine Hicks	N/A
Specialized Christmas Cards
3,897	December 29, 1988	Haldan Martinson, Jessica Vallot	Cristin Morrison
Stump the Band
3,898	December 30, 1988	A. Whitney Brown	Gregory Popovich, Sweet Baby Blues Band
Dictionary Terms
