= List of The Tonight Show Starring Johnny Carson episodes (1990) =

- No. of episodes: 190

Release
- Original network: NBC

Season chronology
- ← Previous; 1989 episodes Next → 1991 episodes

The following is a list of episodes of the television series The Tonight Show Starring Johnny Carson which aired in 1990. In October, 1962 Johnny Carson took over as host of the show from the previous host Jack Paar.

== 1990 ==
=== January ===
No.	Original release date	Guest(s)	Musical/entertainment guest(s)
4,082	January 2, 1990	Jay Leno (guest host), Richard Chamberlain, John Mendoza, Craig T. Nelson, Thomas F. Wilson	N/A
Newspaper Headlines
4,083	January 3, 1990	Tony Danza	Chuck Berry
Blurred Photos; City Nicknames
4,084	January 4, 1990	Lolita Davidovich, Rita Rudner	K. T. Oslin
Census Questions
4,085	January 5, 1990	Bob Saget, Susan Norfleet	Nadja Salerno-Sonnenberg
You Are The Author
4,086	January 9, 1990	Jay Leno (guest host), Denzel Washington, John Chancellor, Faith Ford	Richard Marx
4,087	January 10, 1990	Richard Benjamin	Larry Gatlin
Calendars
4,088	January 11, 1990	Jay Leno (guest host), Tony Randall, Bill Black, Diane Nichols	Kenny Rankin
4,089	January 12, 1990	Jay Leno (guest host), Charlton Heston, Roy Blount, Jr.	N/A
4,090	January 16, 1990	Jay Leno (guest host), Andie MacDowell, Marsha Warfield, Kathleen Sullivan	N/A
4,091	January 17, 1990	Baxter Black, Jeff Cesario	The Roches
Magazine Covers; Johnny's Sick Bed Diary
4,092	January 18, 1990	Joan Embery, Art Donovan, Ron Silver	N/A
Nursery Rhymes Updated for The 90's
4,093	January 19, 1990	Michael Landon, Jimmy Brogan, Roger Rees	N/A
Picking the Noreiga Jury
4,094	January 22, 1990	Jay Leno (guest host), Sandy Duncan, Michael Gross, Fred Roggin	Poco
4,095	January 23, 1990	Jay Leno (guest host), Steve Kelly	Gloria Estefan and Miami Sound Machine
Headlines
4,096	January 24, 1990	Jay Leno (guest host), Shelley Winters, Mr. Wizard	Hoyt Axton
4,097	January 25, 1990	Jay Leno (guest host), Jack Palance, Paul Shaffer	N/A
Humane Animal Products
4,098	January 26, 1990	Jay Leno (guest host), Joanna Kerns, Charles Gibson	Bonnie Raitt
Spot Quiz
4,099	January 30, 1990	Jay Leno (guest host), Connie Chung, Dennis Hopper, Joe Bob Briggs	Highway 101
4,100	January 31, 1990	Martin Short, Cathy Ladman, Bonnie Hunt	N/A
Zipper Clipping; Public Service Announcements

=== February ===
No.	Original release date	Guest(s)	Musical/entertainment guest(s)
4,101	February 1, 1990	Stephanie Yu, Kenneth Branagh, Cathy Guisewite	N/A
News Article; Eavesdropping on The Audience w/Spy Microphone
4,102	February 2, 1990	Carl Reiner, Jennifer Grey	Kathy Mattea
News Article; Disney Character Rejects
4,103	February 6, 1990	Jay Leno (guest host), Jason Bateman	Linda Hopkins
Articles that Appeared In The LA Times and The Wall Street Journal; Pilots That Failed
4,104	February 7, 1990	Don Rickles, Jon Serl	N/A
Homework School of The Air (Professor John W. Carson)
4,105	February 8, 1990	Harry Anderson, Bobby Slayton	Eugene Fodor
What They Have Could Been
4,106	February 9, 1990	Beau Bridges, Rita Rudner	Melissa Manchester
Oil Tanker Driving School; Audience Genealogy
4,107	February 13, 1990	Jay Leno (guest host), Carol Kane, Dom Irrera, Stephen Baldwin	Laurie Anderson
Celeb Valentines
4,108	February 14, 1990	John Larroquette, Dr. Robert Ballard	Jack Jones
4,109	February 15, 1990	Super Dave Osborne, Svetlana Starodomskaya	Stephanie Mills
The Amazing Bonsai Knife commercial
4,110	February 16, 1990	Bob Hope, Magic Johnson	Joe Williams
Letters Received from Frank Lynch; Spills Illustrated Swimsuit Edition; Ink Blot Test
4,111	February 20, 1990	Jay Leno (guest host), Bea Arthur, Paula Poundstone	Al Jarreau
Headlines
4,112	February 21, 1990	Bob Newhart, Buster Douglas	Bo Diddley
Band Calendar (Swimsuit)
4,113	February 22, 1990	Jester Hairston, Susan Norfleet	Aaron Neville, Linda Ronstadt
Carnac the Magnificent
4,114	February 23, 1990	Dabney Coleman, Kenneth Branagh	Restless Heart
Pentagon Products; Expensive Props

=== March ===
No.	Original release date	Guest(s)	Musical/entertainment guest(s)
4,115	March 6, 1990	Jay Leno (guest host), Jeff Foxworthy, Crispin Glover	Natalie Cole
Celeb Cereal
4,116	March 7, 1990	Burt Reynolds, Rene Hall	Ray Price ("For The Good Times")
You Are The Author
4,117	March 8, 1990	Victoria Jackson, Calvin Trillin	The Temptations
Baby's Progress
4,118	March 9, 1990	Meredith Vieira	Ofra Haza
Your Lost Luggage; Expensive Props
4,119	March 13, 1990	Jay Leno (guest host), Harry Hamlin, Neil Patrick Harris, Ritch Shydner	Michael Bolton
4,120	March 14, 1990	Jonathan Winters	Randy Travis
Wide Screen Movie
4,121	March 15, 1990	Hassie & Lassie	Smokey Robinson
Three Minute Education
4,122	March 16, 1990	Lee Trevino, Jeff Cesario	The Trinity Irish Dancers
Irish Toasts
4,123	March 20, 1990	Jay Leno (guest host), Valerie Harper, Rain Pryor, Mario Joyner	N/A
4,124	March 21, 1990	David Steinberg, George Preston	Don McLean
Toppling Domino's
4,125	March 22, 1990	Deborah Norville, Larry Miller	Lyle Lovett
Tonight Show Commercials - 'Obsession', 'Infiniti', 'Docker's', and 'Fastpitch'
4,126	March 23, 1990	Kareem Abdul-Jabbar, Park Overall	Sara Hickman
The 2nd Annual Snivelling Weasel Awards
4,127	March 26, 1990	Jay Leno (guest host), Marsha Warfield, Jimmy Aleck, Roy Blount, Jr.	Regina Belle
4,128	March 27, 1990	Jay Leno (guest host), Jean Stapleton	Starlight Express
Movie Posters (Billboards of Films That Does Not Make the Oscars)
4,129	March 28, 1990	Jay Leno (guest host), Carol Burnett, Martin Mull, Edie McClurg	N/A
Newspaper Headlines
4,130	March 29, 1990	Jay Leno (guest host), Dana Carvey, Wayne Cotter, Dana Delany	N/A
Environmental Safety Gadgets
4,131	March 30, 1990	Jay Leno (guest host), Roger Moore, Sam Donaldson	N/A
Audience Quiz on Previous 'Tonight Shows'

=== April ===
No.	Original release date	Guest(s)	Musical/entertainment guest(s)
4,132	April 3, 1990	Jay Leno (guest host), Rutger Hauer, Bob Costas	They Might Be Giants
4,133	April 4, 1990	Dudley Moore, Kevin Pollak	Shawn Colvin
Letters to Mrs. Breast; Audience Longevity
4,134	April 5, 1990	Lily Tomlin, Bryan Williams	Bulgarian State Female Vocal Choir
Blue Cards
4,135	April 6, 1990	Bob Hope, Jeff Dunham	B.B. King
Mighty Carson Art Players - "Thesaurus Writers Funeral"
4,136	April 10, 1990	Jay Leno (guest host), Robert Hays, Mike Binder, Carol Siskind	N/A
4,137	April 11, 1990	Richard Lewis	Ray Charles
Floyd R. Turbo- "Rebuttal on Broccoli"
4,138	April 12, 1990	Paula Poundstone, Art Donovan	Milt Hinton
Carl Sagan Sketch
4,140	April 16, 1990	Jay Leno (guest host), Billy Crystal, Dave Thomas	Michel'le
4,141	April 17, 1990	Jay Leno (guest host), Dweezil Zappa, Jerry Seinfeld, Judith Hoag	Lorrie Morgan
4,142	April 18, 1990	Jay Leno (guest host), Christine Lahti, Crystal Bernard	Huber Marionettes
Headlines
4,143	April 19, 1990	Jay Leno (guest host), Alan Thicke, Fred Roggin	Julia Fordham
Novelty Items For The 90's
4,144	April 20, 1990	Jay Leno (guest host), Valerie Bertinelli, Paul Reiser	The Desert Rose Band
Audience Quiz
4,145	April 24, 1990	Jay Leno (guest host), Chuck Norris, Meredith Baxter Birney, Jeff Altman	Ricky Van Shelton
4,146	April 25, 1990	Sonny Bono	Alexei Sultanov
Johnny in Indonesia; Crashing Miss Daisy
4,147	April 26, 1990	Tim Conway, Judith Ivey	Clint Black
Art Forgery
4,148	April 27, 1990	Robert Klein, Kevin Spacey, Mary Peyton-Meyer	N/A
Pilots That Failed

=== May ===
No.	Original release date	Guest(s)	Musical/entertainment guest(s)
4,149	May 1, 1990	Jay Leno (guest host), Armand Assante, Clive James, Jane Goodall	N/A
Time Saving Tips; Props
4,150	May 2, 1990	Dabney Coleman, Yakov Smirnoff; Lara Flynn Boyle, announced as a guest, was bumped. She appeared on May 9.	N/A
Things Found Under the Bed
4,151	May 3, 1990	Richard Jeni	Daniel Menendez
Hold Music
4,152	May 4, 1990	Judge Reinhold, Rita Rudner, Rondell Sheridan	N/A
Your Share of The Deficit; Several Ways for 12K To Be Raised by Various Organizations
4,153	May 8, 1990	Jay Leno (guest host), Teri Garr, Eva Marie Saint, Keenen Ivory Wayans	N/A
Headlines
4,154	May 9, 1990	Tony Randall, Lara Flynn Boyle	Andy Koffman & His Frogs
Carnac the Magnificent
4,155	May 10, 1990	John Larroquette, Mark Schiff, Kurt Thomas	N/A
Tonight Show Staff Home Videos
4,156	May 11, 1990	Liv Ullmann, Joe Piscopo	Dirty Dozen Brass Band
Childrens Ending to Proverbs
4,157	May 15, 1990	Jay Leno (guest host), Keith Carradine, Blake Clark, Diana Bellamy	N/A
4,158	May 16, 1990	George Foreman, Andrew Lloyd Webber	Sarah Brightman ("Love Changes Everything" and "Music Of The Night")
Hubble Droodles
4,159	May 17, 1990	Dr. Henry Merritt Stenhouse, Barbara Hershey, Jeff Cesario	N/A
Rubber Chicken Boycott
4,160	May 18, 1990	Bob Hope	Al Green
Recycling Household Items
4,161	May 29, 1990	Jay Leno (guest host), George Carlin, Fran Drescher, Dominick Dunne	N/A
Headlines
4,162	May 30, 1990	Jerry Seinfeld	Leonard Waxdeck & The Birdcallers, Dizzy Gillespie
4,164	May 31, 1990	Arnold Schwarzenegger, David Brenner	1990 National Acrobatic Champions
Audience Genealogy

=== June ===
No.	Original release date	Guest(s)	Musical/entertainment guest(s)
4,165	June 1, 1990	Buddy Hackett, Teresa Ganzel, Dave Thomas	N/A
Mighty Carson Art Players - "Hourly News"
4,166	June 5, 1990	Jay Leno (guest host), Larry Miller, Charles S. Dutton	Joe Cocker
4,167	June 6, 1990	A. Whitney Brown, Judith Hoag	Tony Bennett
Handbook of Practical Knowledge; Rheumatology Letter from Ed
4,168	June 7, 1990	Jay Leno (guest host), Cathy Guisewite, Edie McClurg	Stevie Ray Vaughan ("Tightrope")
Headlines
4,169	June 8, 1990	Patrika Darbo	N/A
4,170	June 12, 1990	Jay Leno (guest host), Bill Cosby	Luther Vandross
The Dumber Image Catalog; Products
4,171	June 13, 1990	Bob Newhart, Peter Jennings	David Byrne ("Mambo")
Tonight Show Audience Graduation
4,172	June 14, 1990	Garry Shandling	Barry Manilow
Government Secrets
4,173	June 15, 1990	Super Dave Osborne, Kirk Douglas, Miss Manners	N/A
Band Number: "Honeysuckle Rose"
4,174	June 18, 1990	Jay Leno (guest host), Harry Hamlin, Sharon Stone, Julia Child	Lenny Kravitz ("Does Anybody Out There Even Care?")
4,175	June 19, 1990	Jay Leno (guest host), Molly Ringwald, Kadeem Hardison, Bill Engvall	The Cowboy Junkies
Headlines
4,176	June 20, 1990	Jay Leno (guest host), Julia Louis-Dreyfus, Phil Hartman, Roy Blount, Jr.	Linda Hopkins
The Phil Donahue Sketch w/Phil Hartman
4,177	June 21, 1990	Jay Leno (guest host), Deborah Norville, Thom Sharp, Peter Weller	N/A
New Soviet Products
4,178	June 22, 1990	Jay Leno (guest host), Bill Murray, Alan King	Leon Redbone

=== July ===
No.	Original release date	Guest(s)	Musical/entertainment guest(s)
4,179	July 2, 1990	Jay Leno (guest host), Tony Randall, Wil Shriner, Faith Ford	Freda Payne
4,180	July 3, 1990	Jay Leno (guest host), Peter Scolari, Rita Rudner, Lauren Tom	Basia
New Summer Movies
4,181	July 4, 1990	Jay Leno (guest host), Joan Embery, Fred Roggin	N/A
Fourth of July Quiz
4,182	July 5, 1990	Jay Leno (guest host), Tom Cruise, Phil Hartman, Helen Hayes	Barry White
Jay's Interview with Donald Trump (Phil Hartman)
4,183	July 6, 1990	Jay Leno (guest host), Larry King, Tom Dreesen, Jeff Daniels	N/A
Audience Quiz
4,184	July 10, 1990	Jay Leno (guest host), Charlie Korsmo, Martin Mull, Bill Maher	Lyle Lovett
Children's Fables
4,185	July 11, 1990	Dana Carvey, Anthony Griffin	Travis Tritt
You Are The Author
4,186	July 12, 1990	George Segal	King's Sisters
Tabloid Headlines
4,187	July 13, 1990	Bob Saget, Jack Coen	Laura Branigan ("Reverse Psychology" and "Never In A Million Years")
Nursery Rhymes
4,188	July 17, 1990	Jay Leno (guest host), Patrick Swayze, Randy Quaid, Jeff Foxworthy	Reba McEntire
4,189	July 18, 1990	Monica Seles, Mike Dugan	Dionne Warwick
New Network Slogans
4,190	July 19, 1990	Cathy Ladman, Thomas F. Wilson	Pointer Sisters, "Friends' Advice (Don't Take It)" and "After You"
Product Recalls
4,191	July 20, 1990	Roseanne Barr, Tom Arnold, Maggie Gill	N/A
Amazing Sports Shots
4,192	July 24, 1990	Jay Leno (guest host), Jack Palance	Patty Loveless
New Food Products
4,193	July 25, 1990	Michael Oliver, John Goodman, Victoria Jackson	Joe Williams
David Souter; Expressions You Never Hear
4,194	July 26, 1990	Liv Ullmann, J.J. Wall, Patrika Darbo	N/A
Commercial Flashcards
4,195	July 27, 1990	Cathy Guisewite, Brian Haley, David Horowitz	N/A
Hold The Music
4,196	July 31, 1990	Jay Leno (guest host), Brian Dennehy, Park Overall	Lou Gramm

=== August ===
No.	Original release date	Guest(s)	Musical/entertainment guest(s)
4,197	August 1, 1990	Don Rickles	The Allman Brothers Band ("Good Clean Fun", "True Gravity")
Homework School of The Air
4,198	August 2, 1990	Hansen Quadruplets, Maria Shriver	Michael McDonald
Virtues of The States
4,199	August 3, 1990	David Brenner, Art Donovan	Al Green
Alternative Supreme Court Justice
4,200	August 6, 1990	Jay Leno (guest host), Kirk Douglas, Willy T. Ribbs	Taylor Dayne ("Love Will Lead You Back")
4,201	August 7, 1990	Jay Leno (guest host), Jon Voight, Kevin Pollak, Steven R. Kutcher	Howard Hewett
Headlines
4,202	August 8, 1990	Jay Leno (guest host), Mel Gibson, Harley Jane Kozak, David Alan Grier	N/A
Album Covers
4,203	August 9, 1990	Jay Leno (guest host), Tim Matheson, Phil Hartman, Mike Myers, Wayne Cotter, Shari Belafonte	N/A
Jay Meets Gorby
4,204	August 10, 1990	Jay Leno (guest host), Henry Winkler, Kevin Nealon, Sarah Jessica Parker	Asleep at the Wheel
Audience Quiz; Gift Certificates for Dinner
4,205	August 14, 1990	Jay Leno (guest host), Steve Martin, James Belushi	James Ingram
4,206	August 15, 1990	Harry Anderson, Joel Murray	N/A
Messages From Home
4,207	August 16, 1990	David Steinberg, Denise Wells	N/A
History of The World
4,208	August 17, 1990	Patrick Swayze	Oleta Adams
Products Around the World
4,209	August 21, 1990	Jay Leno (guest host), Emilio Estevez, Phil Hartman, Lauren Tom	N/A
Chung Watch '90' (Remote w/Phil Hartman)
4,210	August 22, 1990	Richard Lewis, Brooke Adams	The Leningrad Swing Jazz Band
Audience Genealogy
4,211	August 23, 1990	Kid Inventors	Natalie Cole
The Small Print on Your Ticket
4,212	August 24, 1990	Tony Randall, Mark Pitta, George Foreman	N/A
Weird Vacations

=== September ===
No.	Original release date	Guest(s)	Musical/entertainment guest(s)
4,213	September 4, 1990	Jay Leno (guest host), Shirley MacLaine, David Lynch, Richard Libertini	Paul Young
4,214	September 5, 1990	Charles Grodin, Amy Yasbeck	B.B. King ("Let The Good Times Roll" and "Peace To The World")
Carnac the Magnificent
4,215	September 6, 1990	Zachary LaVoy, Charles S. Dutton	K.T. Oslin
New Foreign Products
4,216	September 7, 1990	Jeff Dunham	Etta James & The Roots Band, Leila Josefowicz, The Passing Zone
What They Could Have Been
4,217	September 11, 1990	Jay Leno (guest host), Candice Bergen, George Miller, Charlie Schlatter	N/A
4,218	September 12, 1990	Patrick Duffy, Kevin Meaney	Kid Creole & The Coconuts
Trademarks For Sale
4,219	September 13, 1990	Martin Mull, Anne De Salvo	Ruth Brown
Audience Credits
4,220	September 14, 1990	Bob Hope, Pete Sampras, Park Overall	N/A
U.S.A. Sex Trivia
4,221	September 17, 1990	Jay Leno (guest host), Burt Reynolds, Robert Easton	Wynton Marsalis
4,222	September 18, 1990	Jay Leno (guest host), Shelley Long, Keenen Ivory Wayans, Darlanne Fluegel	The Time
Back To School Items
4,223	September 19, 1990	Jay Leno (guest host), Carol Burnett, Will Smith, Regis Philbin	N/A
Headlines
4,224	September 20, 1990	Jay Leno (guest host), Christine Lahti, Ed Begley, Jr., Dinah Manoff	N/A
TV Guide Ads
4,225	September 21, 1990	Jay Leno (guest host), Jimmy Smits	Celine Dion, Phil Collins
Audience Quiz
4,226	September 25, 1990	Jay Leno, Betty White	Ladysmith Black Mambazo
I Want..
4,227	September 26, 1990	Garry Shandling, George Dzundza	Victoria Williams
100 Least Important Americans
4,228	September 27, 1990	TBA	N/A
28th Anniversary Show
4,229	September 28, 1990	Jay Leno (guest host), Fred Savage, Matthew Modine	N/A

=== October ===
No.	Original release date	Guest(s)	Musical/entertainment guest(s)
4,230	October 2, 1990	Jay Leno (guest host), Paul Sorvino, Peggy Lipton, Nicollette Sheridan	John Hiatt
4,231	October 3, 1990	Becky Klemt, Rita Rudner	Johnny Clegg & Savuka
Least Played Songs
4,232	October 4, 1990	Alan King, Maryedith Burrell	George Benson
Mighty Carson Art Players - "David Howitzer - Consumer Supporter"
4,233	October 5, 1990	Robert Klein, Jackie Collins	Bela Fleck & The Flecktones
Dream Analysis
4,234	October 9, 1990	Jay Leno (guest host), Elizabeth Perkins, Perry King, Paula Poundstone	Zachary Richard
Jay Reads One Headline
4,235	October 10, 1990	Shelby Foote	Louie Bellson
4,236	October 11, 1990	Father Guido Sarducci, Jim Fowler	N/A
4,237	October 12, 1990	Teri Garr, Kevin Pollak	N/A
4,238	October 15, 1990	Jay Leno (guest host), Tom Selleck, Will Smith, Jeff Cesario	Take 6
4,239	October 16, 1990	Jay Leno (guest host), Craig T. Nelson, Helen Thomas, Nancy Valen	Garth Brooks
Headlines
4,240	October 17, 1990	Jay Leno (guest host), Amy Irving, Rich Hall, Scott Bakula	Los Lobos
4,241	October 18, 1990	Jay Leno (guest host), Kadeem Hardison, Barry Levinson, Tony Goldwyn	The Neville Brothers
4,242	October 19, 1990	Jay Leno (guest host), Angela Lansbury, Walter Cronkite	John Denver
Audience Quiz
4,243	October 30, 1990	Jay Leno (guest host), Kate Jackson, Wayne Cotter, Mark Lewis	Patty Loveless
Trick or Treaters
4,244	October 31, 1990	John Larroquette, Anthony Griffith (actor), Kevin Pollak	N/A
Happy Birthday, Fred

=== November ===
No.	Original release date	Guest(s)	Musical/entertainment guest(s)
4,245	November 1, 1990	Carl Reiner, Shelby Foote	Gary Morris
Audience Survey
4,246	November 2, 1990	Ed Begley, Jr., Calvin Trillin	Cupstacking Champions
Floyd R. Turbo - "Against Female Reporters in Mens' Locker Rooms"
4,247	November 6, 1990	Jay Leno (guest host), Robert Urich, Sally Jessy Raphael, John Wesley Shipp, Johnny Dark	N/A
4,248	November 7, 1990	George Segal, Neil Patrick Harris, David Cota & his parakeet	N/A
Rules of Thumb
4,249	November 8, 1990	Super Dave Osborne, Paul Reiser	Stan Getz
Showbiz Flashcards
4,250	November 9, 1990	George Foreman, Joanna Kerns	James Ingram
Book Store/Video Store Test
4,251	November 13, 1990	Jay Leno (guest host), Marilu Henner, Franklyn Ajaye, Charles Kuralt	John Mayall
4,252	November 14, 1990	Harry Anderson, Bob Uecker	Dan Fogelberg
You Are The Author
4,253	November 15, 1990	Bob Newhart, Catherine O'Hara	Celine Dion ("Where Does My Heart Beat Now?")
New Crimes
4,254	November 16, 1990	Jester Hairston, Rita Rudner, Joan Benny	Jimmy Buffett
4,255	November 20, 1990	Jay Leno (guest host), Sharon Gless, Michael Moriarty	Mariah Carey ("Vision Of Love")
Books by Pets
4,256	November 21, 1990	Father Guido Sarducci	Ray Charles
The Tonight Show Philharmoonic
4,257	November 22, 1990	Dean Dill	Cirque du Soleil, Louie Bellson
Kids' Letters
4,258	November 23, 1990	James Garner, Andy Grayson	Sara Hickman
Talk with Ed; Blue Cards

=== December ===
No.	Original release date	Guest(s)	Musical/entertainment guest(s)
4,259	December 4, 1990	Jay Leno (guest host), Charlie Sheen, George Wallace	Judy Collins
Newspaper Headlines
4,260	December 5, 1990	Miss Manners, Kelly McDonald	Randy Travis
Taboos Around The World
4,261	December 6, 1990	George Carlin, Kimmy Robertson	Pete Fountain
Altered Car Logos
4,262	December 7, 1990	David Letterman	Patti LaBelle
Lucky Lottery Numbers
4,263	December 11, 1990	Jay Leno (guest host), Clint Eastwood, Olivia Newton-John	Whitney Houston
Bumper Stickers
4,264	December 12, 1990	Richard Benjamin	Johnny Clegg & Savuka
New Products
4,265	December 13, 1990	Bob Hope, Kirstie Alley, John Travolta	The Go-Go's ("Our Lips Are Sealed", "Vacation")
Poinsetta Talks; Foreign Commercials
4,266	December 14, 1990	Kadeem Hardison, Mark Schiff	Dolly Parton
Santa Letters
4,267	December 17, 1990	Jay Leno (guest host), Glenn Close, John Chancellor, Bill Maher	Rosanne Cash
4,268	December 18, 1990	Jay Leno (guest host), Kathy Bates, Jake Johannsen	Barry Manilow, K.T. Oslin
Kids Letters
4,269	December 19, 1990	Jay Leno (guest host), Joe Pantoliano, Jacqueline Bisset	Johnny Mathis
Headlines
4,270	December 20, 1990	Jay Leno (guest host), John Mendoza, Olivia Brown, Miko Hughes	The Jeff Healey Band
Pet Products
4,271	December 21, 1990	Jay Leno (guest host), James Avery, Paul Hogan	Lou Rawls, Jasmine Guy
Audience Quiz
4,272	December 31, 1990	Jay Leno (guest host), Jane Pauley, Phil Hartman	B.B. King, Dwight Yoakam
Times Square Remote; Phil Donahue Sketch
