= List of The Tonight Show Starring Johnny Carson episodes (1991) =

- No. of episodes: 185

Release
- Original network: NBC

Season chronology
- ← Previous; 1990 episodes Next → 1992 episodes

The following is a list of episodes of the television series The Tonight Show Starring Johnny Carson which aired in 1991. In October, 1962 Johnny Carson took over as host of the show from the previous host Jack Paar.

== 1991 ==
=== January ===
No.	Original release date	Guest(s)	Musical/entertainment guest(s)
6,345	January 2, 1991	Merv Griffin, Jonathan Katz	Leon Redbone
Predictions
6,346	January 3, 1991	Kevin Costner, Lou Holtz	The Neville Brothers
Expressions You Never Hear
6,347	January 4, 1991	Jeff Cesario, The Meteorite Girls	The Robert Cray Band
Material Supporter Phone; Foreign Commercials
6,348	January 8, 1991	Jay Leno (guest host), Mayim Bialik, Marlo Thomas, Charles Johnson	Alias
Headlines
6,349	January 9, 1991	Tony Danza, Willis Eden	Chris Isaak ("Wicked Game", "Blue Hotel")
Carnac the Magnificent
6,350	January 10, 1991	Robin Williams	Steve Lawrence
What Have I Learned; Scientific Research on Cow Belching's Effect on Global Warming
6,351	January 11, 1991	Bob Hope, Richard Harris, Helen Thomas	N/A
Future Products
6,352	January 15, 1991	Jay Leno (guest host), Jerry Seinfeld, Tyne Daly, Corbin Bernsen	Jeffrey Osborne
6,353	January 18, 1991	Dyan Cannon, Brian Haley	N/A
New Products; Predictions Scientists Have Made About Things We Will Have In Our Home In The Year 2000
6,354	January 21, 1991	Jay Leno (guest host), Joan Embery, Jeremy Irons, Paula Poundstone	N/A
6,355	January 22, 1991	Jay Leno (guest host), Andie MacDowell, Will Smith, Helen Shaver	N/A
Headlines
6,356	January 23, 1991	Jay Leno (guest host), Robert Urich, Louie Anderson, Edie McClurg	Indigo Girls
6,357	January 24, 1991	Jay Leno (guest host), Lucie Arnaz, Joe Mantegna, Fred Roggin	Garth Brooks
Movie Posters
6,358	January 25, 1991	Jay Leno (guest host), Steve Guttenberg, Jack Palance, Patrika Darbo	Surface
Audience Quiz
6,359	January 29, 1991	Jay Leno (guest host), Richard Dreyfuss, Danny Thomas, Kelly Preston	Celine Dion
6,360	January 30, 1991	George Burns, Jack Mayberry, Sofia Coppola	N/A
Acronyms
6,361	January 31, 1991	Jeff Hostetler, Jonathan Winters	Sarah Brightman ("Capped Teeth And Caesar Salad")

=== February ===
No.	Original release date	Guest(s)	Musical/entertainment guest(s)
6,362	February 1, 1991	Carl Reiner, John Riggi	Roger McGuinn
Baghdad Betty Joke; Kids Proverbs
6,363	February 5, 1991	Jay Leno (guest host), Marilu Henner, Debbie Allen, Paul Provenza	Wilson Phillips
6,364	February 6, 1991	Dan Aykroyd, Sarah Evetts	Maceo Parker
Homework School Of The Air (Professor John W. Carson)
6,365	February 7, 1991	Robert Morse, Ritch Shydner	Clint Black
Euphemism Speech - What the Congressman Really Said In His Speech
6,366	February 8, 1991	Richard Lewis	John Mayall
Perfect Design
6,367	February 12, 1991	Jay Leno (guest host), Anthony Quinn, Kevin Pollak, Sheryl Lee	Tracie Spencer
Headlines
6,368	February 13, 1991	Jodie Foster, C.F. Corzine	Oleta Adams
Rejected Valentine's Day Cards
6,369	February 14, 1991	Garry Shandling, Cathy Guisewite	Zachary Richard
Light Her Fire - Johnny gives romantic ideas to please your valentine.
6,370	February 15, 1991	Michael Landon, Blake Clark, Mary McDonnell	N/A
You Are The Author
6,371	February 19, 1991	Jay Leno (guest host), John Goodman, Kevin Bacon, Louie Anderson	Urban Dance Squad
6,372	February 20, 1991	Miko Hughes, David Brenner, Roger Rees	N/A
Desk - Johnny presents fake trivia facts.
6,373	February 21, 1991	Jerry Seinfeld, Brooke Adams, Rod McQueary & Colen Sweeten (cowboy poets)	N/A
Desk - Johnny shows new toys for the Christmas season.
6,374	February 22, 1991	Ted Danson, Park Overall	Joe Williams
Mighty Carson Art Players - "Glue Sketch"

=== March ===
No.	Original release date	Guest(s)	Musical/entertainment guest(s)
6,375	March 5, 1991	Jay Leno (guest host), Michael J. Fox, Raven-Symoné	N/A
6,376	March 6, 1991	Bill Cosby, Joseph Gabriel	Diane Schuur
Famous Last Words
6,377	March 7, 1991	David Steinberg, Sophamae Landry	Gary Morris
Entertainment Survey
6,378	March 8, 1991	Richard Harris, Martin Mull	Alias
Stumpies
6,379	March 12, 1991	Jay Leno (guest host), Judith Ivey, Billy Dee Williams	Styx ("Show Me The Way")
Props
6,380	March 13, 1991	General Thomas W. Kelly, Max Alexander	Sandi Patty
Ink Blots
6,381	March 14, 1991	Teri Garr, Calvin Trillin	B.B. King
Blue Cards
6,382	March 15, 1991	James Woods, Isabella Rossellini	The Trinity Irish Dancers
St. Patrick's Day Toasts
6,383	March 19, 1991	Jay Leno (guest host), Anthony Hopkins, Robert Klein	Dave Koz
6,384	March 20, 1991	John Larroquette, Anthony Griffith, Roy Blount, Jr.	N/A
The 3rd Annual Snivelling Weasel's Choice Awards (an Oscar spoof which ironically proved two-thirds accurate).
6,385	March 21, 1991	Albert Brooks, Yakov Smirnoff	The Robert Cray Band
If There Were Any Justice...
6,386	March 22, 1991	Bob Newhart, Wolf Blitzer	Bobby McFerrin ("Baby")
New Novelty Products
6,387	March 25, 1991	Jay Leno (guest host), Shelley Winters, Jim Carrey, Dawnn Lewis	Pet Shop Boys
6,388	March 26, 1991	Jay Leno (guest host), Tyne Daly, George Wallace	Carlene Carter
6,399	March 27, 1991	Jay Leno (guest host), Jack Lemmon, Ted Wass, Bob Costas	Hall & Oates
6,400	March 28, 1991	Jay Leno (guest host), Robert Townsend, Sissy Spacek, Pierce Brosnan	Roger McGuinn
6,401	March 29, 1991	Jay Leno (guest host), Cheryl Ladd, Wayne Cotter, Mayim Bialik	N/A

=== April ===
No.	Original release date	Guest(s)	Musical/entertainment guest(s)
6,402	April 2, 1991	Jay Leno (guest host), Jaleel White, Victoria Principal, Barry Levinson	Mary Wilson
Movie Posters
6,403	April 3, 1991	Leonard Nimoy, Bill Maher, B.J. Sniff	N/A
Pilots
6,404	April 4, 1991	Super Dave Osborne, Rita Rudner, George Segal	N/A
Falling Redwood
6,405	April 5, 1991	Marilu Henner, Brian Regan	Dianne Reeves ("Love For Sale", "Afro Blue")
Letter Received from M/M Smith; Spear Fishing Vacation in S. Dakota
6,406	April 9, 1991	Jay Leno (guest host), Scott Bakula, Elizabeth Ashley	Chris Isaak
Headlines
6,407	April 10, 1991	Paul Reiser, Jim Valvano	Gary Lakes
Misery Bingo
6,408	April 11, 1991	Bob Saget, Cathy Ladman, Arthur Kent	N/A
Mighty Carson Art Players - "Brutally Honest Anonymous"
6,409	April 12, 1991	Tony Randall, John Dobson	Sheena Easton ("What Comes Naturally" and "The Next Time")
6,410	April 15, 1991	Jay Leno (guest host), Kadeem Hardison, Sarah Jessica Parker	The Boys
6,411	April 16, 1991	Jay Leno (guest host), Jamie Lee Curtis, Jeff Foxworthy, John Wesley Shipp	Johnny Gill
6,412	April 17, 1991	Jay Leno (guest host), Kathy Bates, Lee Horsley, Marc Salzman	The Temptations
Headlines
6,413	April 18, 1991	Jay Leno (guest host), Neil Simon, Mario Van Peebles	Travis Tritt
Celebrity Product Endorsements
6,414	April 19, 1991	Jay Leno (guest host), Richard Dean Anderson, Julia Louis-Dreyfus, Jeff Cesario	Keith Sweat
Audience Quiz
6,415	April 23, 1991	Jay Leno (guest host), James Earl Jones, Bonnie Bedelia, John McLaughlin	George Strait
6,416	April 24, 1991	Clifton Hillegass, Alan King	Leon Redbone
Marriage Advice
6,417	April 25, 1991	Dabney Coleman, Jim Fowler	Lorrie Morgan
Rare Photos
6,418	April 26, 1991	Burt Reynolds, John Wing	The Meeting
Altered Car Logos
6,419	April 30, 1991	Jay Leno (guest host), Michael Keaton, Loni Anderson, A. Whitney Brown	The Kentucky Headhunters
Headlines

=== May ===
No.	Original release date	Guest(s)	Musical/entertainment guest(s)
6,420	May 1, 1991	Roger Moore, Jack Mayberry	The Rembrandts
Carnac the Magnificent
6,421	May 2, 1991	Sylvester Stallone, Max Alexander, Orson Bean	N/A
Blue Cards
6,422	May 3, 1991	Dick Cavett, Chief Jesse Smith	Al Green
Edge of Wetness
6,423	May 7, 1991	Jay Leno (guest host), Michael Gross, JoBeth Williams, Bob Greene	Freddie Jackson
Headlines
6,424	May 8, 1991	Sharon Maughan, Steven Wright	Dolly Parton
Mother's Day Gifts
6,425	May 9, 1991	Michael Landon, George Foreman	Joe Jackson
Blue Cards
6,426	May 10, 1991	Jack Palance, Wendy Liebman, Bob Evans	Linda Hopkins
6,427	May 14, 1991	Jay Leno (guest host), Jill Clayburgh, Cindy Crawford, Louis Gossett Jr.	N/A
Headlines; Interview with The Stewardess
6,428	May 15, 1991	Jerry Seinfeld, Marv Albert	Julio Iglesias
6,429	May 16, 1991	Jay Leno, Jaleel White	Oak Ridge Boys
Foreign Products
6,430	May 17, 1991	John Candy, Maureen O'Hara, Jim Valvano	Shirley Horn ("Come Dance With Me")
Stumpies: Johnny talks with a few members of audience who try to stump band with songs band doesn't know
6,431	May 28, 1991	Jay Leno (guest host), Bernard Shaw, Rick Reynolds	Michael Bolton
Props and Books - Major Booksellers
6,432	May 29, 1991	Richard Benjamin, Paula Prentiss	Leonard Waxdeck and The Birdcallers
Satellite Photos
6,433	May 30, 1991	Dana Delany, Larry Miller	Pat Benatar ("Good Life", "True Love")
Audience Graduation Speech
6,434	May 31, 1991	Don Rickles, Randall Richman	Roxette
Hold Music

=== June ===
No.	Original release date	Guest(s)	Musical/entertainment guest(s)
6,435	June 4, 1991	Jay Leno (guest host), Geena Davis, Sean Astin, C. Everett Koop	Peabo Bryson
Headlines
6,436	June 5, 1991	John Henton, Baxter Black	Tony Bennett
Slogans
6,437	June 6, 1991	Kadeem Hardison, John Dobson	Chris Isaak ("Diddley Daddy", "That's My Desire")
Voluntary Tax Quiz
6,438	June 7, 1991	Liv Ullmann, John Riggi	Joe Williams
Blue Cards
6,439	June 11, 1991	Jay Leno (guest host), Spike Lee, Jack Palance, Evelyn Keyes	Gerardo ("We Got The Funk", "Rico Suave")
6,440	June 12, 1991	Raven-Symoné, Robert Townsend, John McLaughlin	N/A
Euphemisms
6,441	June 13, 1991	Wayne Cotter, Victoria Jackson	Stevie Wonder
What Have I Learned
6,442	June 14, 1991	Bill Cosby, Beau Bridges	Morrissey ("Sing Your Life", "A Place In Hell")
You Are The Author
6,443	June 17, 1991	Jay Leno (guest host), Daniel Stern, Fred Roggin	Doobie Brothers
Headlines
6,444	June 18, 1991	Jay Leno (guest host), Gregory Harrison, Gabrielle Anwar, Charlie Hill	Rhythm Tribe
Trapezoid Quiz
6,445	June 19, 1991	Jay Leno (guest host), Julianne Phillips, Ron Richards, Bashkim Dibra	Natalie Cole
6,446	June 20, 1991	Jay Leno (guest host), Joe Mantegna, Robert Foxworth, Edie McClurg	Dave Koz
Summer Products
6,447	June 21, 1991	Jay Leno (guest host), Scott Glenn, Fran Drescher	Surface
Audience Quiz

=== July ===
No.	Original release date	Guest(s)	Musical/entertainment guest(s)
6,448	July 1, 1991	Jay Leno (guest host), Charles S. Dutton, Spalding Gray, Liliane Montevecchi	The Blessing
6,449	July 2, 1991	Jay Leno (guest host), John Chancellor, Charnele Brown	Vince Gill
Trapezoid Quiz
6,450	July 3, 1991	Jay Leno (guest host), Bob Saget, Jerry Van Dyke, Rosalind Chao	Richard Kastle
Headlines
6,451	July 4, 1991	Jay Leno (guest host), Dixie Carter, Phil Hartman, Charles Kimbrough	Joey DeFrancesco
Visit from President Zachary Taylor (Phil Hartman)
6,452	July 5, 1991	Jay Leno (guest host), Michael Moriarty, Debbie Allen, Chuck Martin	Kenny Rankin, Dan Siegel
6,453	July 9, 1991	Jay Leno (guest host), Elizabeth Perkins, P.J. O'Rourke	Willie Nelson, Waylon Jennings
6,455	July 10, 1991	Jay Leno (guest host), Louie Anderson, Orson Bean	Celine Dion
Headlines
6,456	July 11, 1991	Jay Leno (guest host), Arnold Schwarzenegger, Paul Provenza	Itzhak Perlman
6,457	July 12, 1991	Jay Leno (guest host), Steve Kelley, Catherine Crier	Keith Washington
6,458	July 16, 1991	Jay Leno (guest host), Dennis Hopper, Linda Ellerbee, Helen Slater	Wynton Marsalis
6,459	July 17, 1991	Magic Johnson	Bernadette Peters
Snack Food Tax Differential; Blue Cards
6,460	July 18, 1991	Madeline Kahn	Gloria Estefan
Book Store Interviews
6,461	July 19, 1991	Bob Newhart, Robert Klein	Leon Redbone
High Definition Camera
6,462	July 23, 1991	Jay Leno (guest host), John Stamos, Edwin Newman	Alan Jackson
Headlines
6,463	July 24, 1991	Mel Brooks	Diana Ross
Odd Facts
6,464	July 25, 1991	Dudley Moore, Wayne Cotter	K.T. Oslin
Tickets to Other Shows
6,465	July 26, 1991	Susan Sarandon, Dr. Norman Gary	Lyle Lovett
Blue Cards
6,466	July 30, 1991	Jay Leno (guest host), Phil Hartman, Jeff Cesario, Beverly D'Angelo	Robert Palmer ("I'll Be Your Baby Tonight", "Mercy Mercy Me/I Want You")
Senator Interview
6,467	July 31, 1991	Michael J. Fox, Yakov Smirnoff	Mel Tormé
Staff Handy Hints

=== August ===
No.	Original release date	Guest(s)	Musical/entertainment guest(s)
6,468	August 1, 1991	Martin Mull, Jonathan Katz, Cathy Guisewite	N/A
License Plate Slogans
6,469	August 2, 1991	Garry Shandling, Charles Fleischer	Dianne Reeves
Celebrity Albums
6,470	August 13, 1991	Jay Leno (guest host), Mayim Bialik, Richard Grieco, Amy Tan	Blue Rodeo
6,471	August 14, 1991	Martin Short, David Spade	Linda Hopkins
I Want Speech
6,472	August 15, 1991	Joan Embery, Dennis Hopper, Rich Hall	N/A
Beezer the Lonely Parakeet
6,473	August 16, 1991	Lance Burton, Jeff Dunham	The Passing Zone
Blue Cards
6,474	August 20, 1991	Jay Leno (guest host), Paul Reiser, Karyn Parsons, Garry Kasparov	Williams Brothers
6,475	August 21, 1991	Burt Reynolds, David Horowitz	David Sanborn
Expressions You Never Hear
6,476	August 22, 1991	Kevin Meaney, Lou Ferrigno	Billy Falcon
Mergers & Slogans; Foreign Commercials
6,477	August 23, 1991	David Steinberg, Kenneth Branagh	Harper Brothers
International Symbols
6,478	August 27, 1991	Jay Leno (guest host), Alex Rocco, Jan Hooks	Michael W. Smith, William Ross
6,479	August 28, 1991	Dyan Cannon, Baxter Black	David Friesen, Uwe Kropinski
You Are The Author
6,480	August 29, 1991	Emma Thompson	Pat Benatar ("So Long", "Blood Shot Eyes")
Stump the Band
6,481	August 30, 1991	David Letterman, Michael Moschen	B.B. King ("I'm Movin' On")
Mighty Carson Art Players - "Telescam Home Shopping Network"

=== September ===
No.	Original release date	Guest(s)	Musical/entertainment guest(s)
6,482	September 10, 1991	Jay Leno (guest host), John Goodman, Robert Guillaume	Kenny Loggins
6,483	September 11, 1991	Bob Hope, Ron Silver	Crowded House performed ("Fall At Your Feet" and "Only Natural")
Democracy Is
6,484	September 12, 1991	Marilu Henner, Dom DeLuise	Bela Fleck & The Flecktones ("Blu-Bop")
Stump the Band
6,485	September 13, 1991	James Garner, Ron Shock, Pete Rose	N/A
Phobias
6,486	September 17, 1991	Jay Leno (guest host), John Singleton, John McLaughlin, David Keith	Bonnie Raitt performed ("Something To Talk About")
6,487	September 18, 1991	Dabney Coleman, Connie Ray	Clint Black
Replacement Shows for Fall
6,488	September 19, 1991	Robin Williams, Jonathan Winters, Park Overall	N/A
6,489	September 20, 1991	Sean Penn	Neil Diamond ("If There Were No Dreams", "Sweet Caroline" and "One Hand, One Heart")
Altered Car Logos
6,490	September 23, 1991	Jay Leno (guest host), Mike Wallace, Will Smith	Randy Travis
6,491	September 24, 1991	Jay Leno (guest host), Teri Garr, Carol Leifer	BeBe & CeCe Winans
Police Blotter
6,492	September 25, 1991	Jay Leno (guest host), Mark Harmon, Crystal Bernard, Twiggy	Candy Dulfer
6,493	September 26, 1991	Jay Leno (guest host), Jerry Seinfeld, Matt Groening	N/A
Props - TV Show Art Cards
6,494	September 27, 1991	Jay Leno (guest host), Richard Dean Anderson, Kimberly Williams-Paisley, Bob Greene	Riff
Trapezoid Quiz

=== October ===
No.	Original release date	Guest(s)	Musical/entertainment guest(s)
6,495	October 1, 1991	Jay Leno (guest host), Corbin Bernsen, Fran Drescher, Branford Marsalis, Henry Alford	N/A
Headlines
6,496	October 2, 1991	Jay Leno (guest host), Pete Barbutti, Fred Roggin, Stephanie Hodge	James Taylor
6,497	October 3, 1991	TBA	N/A
29th Anniversary Show
6,498	October 8, 1991	Jay Leno (guest host), James Earl Jones, Roma Downey	N/A
6,499	October 9, 1991	Tony Danza, Rita Rudner	Allman Brothers Band
Our Liz Wedding Photos
6,500	October 10, 1991	Carl Reiner, Destiny, Mike Zele	N/A
Carnac the Magnificent
6,501	October 11, 1991	Ann-Margret, John Henton	B.B. King
Mighty Carson Art Players - "David Howitzer - Consumer Reporter"
6,502	October 14, 1991	Jay Leno (guest host), Ken Wahl, Kevin Pollak, Brock Yates	The Manhattan Transfer
6,503	October 15, 1991	Jay Leno (guest host), Kadeem Hardison, Larry Miller, Craig T. Nelson	Russ Irwin
6,504	October 16, 1991	Jay Leno (guest host), Jodie Foster, Wayne Cotter	Michael Bolton
Education Aids
6,505	October 17, 1991	Jay Leno (guest host), Andy Griffith, Ron Richards	Garth Brooks
6,506	October 18, 1991	Jay Leno (guest host), Lily Tomlin, Neil Patrick Harris, Annie Leibovitz	Martika ("Love... Thy Will Be Done")
Trapezoid Quiz
6,507	October 29, 1991	Jay Leno (guest host), Jeff Daniels, Julia Louis-Dreyfus, Garry Marshall	N/A
6,508	October 30, 1991	Harry Anderson, Jim Carrey	Fourplay
Country Song Titles
6,509	October 31, 1991	Richard Lewis, Kevin Rooney	Al Jarreau
Carved Pumpkins; Homework School of The Air

=== November ===
No.	Original release date	Guest(s)	Musical/entertainment guest(s)
6,510	November 1, 1991	Jim Fowler, Dudley Moore, Calvin Trillin	N/A
6,511	November 5, 1991	Jay Leno (guest host), Robert Stack, Steve Landesberg	Harry Connick, Jr.
6,512	November 6, 1991	Ted Danson, Richard Jeni	James Brown
The Presidents
6,513	November 7, 1991	Patrick Duffy, Jeff Foxworthy	Animal Logic
Collectibles
6,514	November 8, 1991	George Segal, Drew Carey, Penelope Ann Miller	N/A
Blue Cards
6,515	November 12, 1991	Jay Leno (guest host), Jaleel White, Paula Poundstone, Edie McClurg	N/A
6,516	November 13, 1991	Glenn Close, Tim Allen	Buddy Guy ("Damn Right, I've Got The Blues")
Nursery Rhymes
6,517	November 14, 1991	George Burns, Barry Levinson	Patricia Kaas
Network Slogans
6,518	November 15, 1991	Bob Uecker, Ray Romano	Joshua Bell
Flash Cards
6,519	November 19, 1991	Jay Leno (guest host), Jamie Lee Curtis, Gerald McRaney, Katherine Helmond	Huey Lewis & The News
6,520	November 20, 1991	Bill Cosby, Cathy Guisewite	N/A
What I'm Thankful For
6,521	November 21, 1991	Bob Newhart, George Lopez	Lisa Stansfield ("Change" and "Time To Make You Mine")
Kids' Answers to Questions about Thanksgiving
6,522	November 22, 1991	Bill Maher	Bette Midler ("Stuff Like That There", "Every Road Leads Back To You" and "In My Life")
6,523	November 25, 1991	Jay Leno (guest host), Joan Collins, James Avery	The Judds
6,524	November 26, 1991	Jay Leno (guest host), Luke Perry, Jason Alexander	Smokey Robinson
6,525	November 27, 1991	Jay Leno (guest host), William Shatner, Ted Wass, Halle Berry	Marc Cohn
6,526	November 28, 1991	Jay Leno (guest host), Alan Rachins, Dame Edna Everage, Lewis Grizzard	N/A
Bumper Stickers
6,527	November 29, 1991	Jay Leno (guest host), Shirley MacLaine, Kirk Cameron	N/A

=== December ===
No.	Original release date	Guest(s)	Musical/entertainment guest(s)
6,528	December 3, 1991	Jay Leno (guest host), Richard Crenna, Jason Priestley	Richard Marx
6,529	December 4, 1991	John Larroquette, Brian Haley	N/A
Sununu
6,530	December 6, 1991	Anjelica Huston, Richard Harris, Elaine Miles	Sean McDermott, Lea Salonga
6,531	December 10, 1991	Jay Leno (guest host), Norm Macdonald, Mark Shields, Anna Chlumsky	Barry Manilow
6,532	December 11, 1991	Burt Reynolds, Al Lubel	Vince Gill
You Are The Author
6,533	December 12, 1991	Robert Klein, Jim Valvano	Aaron Neville ("The Christmas Song" and "O Holy Night")
Burbank Triangle
6,534	December 13, 1991	Kevin Kline, Dennis Miller	Procol Harum
Johnny in Audience
6,535	December 17, 1991	Jay Leno (guest host), Bob Hope, Kathy Bates, Joe Mantegna	N/A
6,536	December 18, 1991	George Foreman	Jack Jones
New Products
6,537	December 19, 1991	Steve Martin, Cathy Ladman	Leon Redbone
Children's Christmas Letters
6,538	December 20, 1991	Jonathan Winters, Bonnie Hunt	Joe Williams ("Let It Snow! Let It Snow! Let It Snow!" and "Winter Wonderland")
Blue Cards
6,539	December 30, 1991	Jay Leno (guest host), Ahmad Rashad, Tammy Lauren	Fabulous Thunderbirds
Headlines
6,540	December 31, 1991	Jay Leno (guest host), Phil Hartman, Carol Leifer, Kadeem Hardison, Ron Richards	Tracie Spencer
Sketch - "Lust Connection"
