= List of The Tonight Show Starring Johnny Carson episodes (1989) =

- No. of episodes: 183

Release
- Original network: NBC

Season chronology
- ← Previous; 1988 episodes Next → 1990 episodes

The following is a list of episodes of the television series The Tonight Show Starring Johnny Carson which aired in 1989. In October, 1962 Johnny Carson took over as host of the show from the previous host Jack Paar.

== 1989 ==
=== January ===
No.	Original release date	Guest(s)	Musical/entertainment guest(s)
5,974	January 4, 1989	James Stewart, Bob Saget	Preston Smith ("Oh, I Love You So")
Famous Cliches
5,975	January 5, 1989	David Steinberg, Jake Johannsen, Susie Essman	N/A
A film clip showing things people have done with the Garfields & does the dead rabbit joke.
5,976	January 6, 1989	Paul Reiser, Jason Bateman, Mabel Hines Buck	N/A
5,977	January 9, 1989	Jay Leno (guest host), Ken Olin, Calvin Trillin	Jeffrey Osborne
5,978	January 11, 1989	Linda Clark, Victoria Jackson	Chuck Berry ("Carol" and "Little Queenie")
Questions from the game 'Telling Lies'
5,979	January 12, 1989	Don Rickles, Rolf Benirschke	Tiffany ("All This Time")
El Mouldo
5,980	January 13, 1989	Robert Klein, Blair Brown, Teddy Andrews	N/A
Phobias
5,981	January 16, 1989	Jay Leno (guest host), Robert Urich, Carol Kane, Jimmy Brogan, Mr. Rogers	N/A
Actual Newspaper Ads
5,982	January 18, 1989	Dudley Moore, Jerry Seinfeld	K.T. Oslin
Verbal Survey on High School Students Who Failed to Pass Simple Economics Tests
5,983	January 19, 1989	Suzanne Pleshette, Baxter Black	Louie Bellson
Mighty Carson Art Players - "The Reagans' Farewell"
5,984	January 30, 1989	Jay Leno (guest host), Tom Selleck, Lisa Hartman, Joan Embery	N/A
List of Clothing and Accessories Made by Food Companies

=== February ===
No.	Original release date	Guest(s)	Musical/entertainment guest(s)
5,985	February 1, 1989	Martin Short, Isabella Rossellini, Gene Fleming with Andy	N/A
Nude Audience Members
5,986	February 2, 1989	Jay Leno, Fred Savage	Brian Gillis (magician)
Rejected Slogans for Products
5,987	February 3, 1989	Fred Roggin	Snooky Young
Small Print from the Back of Tickets
5,988	February 6, 1989	Jay Leno (guest host), John Ritter, Larry Miller, Frank Bruno	N/A
Headlines
5,989	February 8, 1989	John Larroquette, Lance Burton, Jennifer Tilly	N/A
Personal Phone Messages for The Audience from Home
5,990	February 9, 1989	Bob Uecker, Cathy Guisewite	Jacob Armen
Johnny's demonstration of Liquid Nitrogen from the Jet Propulsion Lab.
5,991	February 10, 1989	Super Dave Osborne, Mark Schiff, Park Overall	N/A
Verbal Multiple Choice Quiz on Oliver North
5,992	February 13, 1989	Jay Leno (guest host), Sandy Duncan, Paula Poundstone, Gene Siskel, Roger Ebert	N/A
Jay read from the book, 'Sweeps Week Preview - Not To Be Seen by the General Public'.
5,993	February 15, 1989	Patrick Swayze	Rodney Crowell
Professor John W. Carson; Kid Inventors
5,994	February 16, 1989	George Carlin	Don McLean
With the aid of a high resolution camera, Johnny reads the notes that are now seen in some famous pictures.
5,995	February 17, 1989	James Woods, Gloria DeHaven	N/A
Special Interest Magazines
5,996	February 20, 1989	Jay Leno (guest host), Harry Anderson, Ted Danson, Paul Williams	N/A
Newspaper Clippings
5,997	February 22, 1989	Mark & Carol Hebbard, Alan King	N/A
Rare Pictures Being Sought by The National Archives
5,998	February 23, 1989	Carl Reiner, Miriam Margolyes	Sandi Patty
Zontar Rather
5,999	February 24, 1989	George Bush, Ray Sharkey, Brooke Adams	N/A
Blue Cards
6,000	February 27, 1989	Jay Leno (guest host), Debbie Reynolds, Kevin Nealon, Kirk Cameron	N/A
The 6,000th episode aired on this date.
6,001	February 28, 1989	Jay Leno (guest host), Tom Bosley, Cybill Shepherd, Dick Butkus	Michelle Shocked

=== March ===
No.	Original release date	Guest(s)	Musical/entertainment guest(s)
6,002	March 1, 1989	Jay Leno (guest host), Sigourney Weaver	Marilyn Horne ("Di tanti palpiti", "Make a Rainbow")
Separated at Birth
6,003	March 2, 1989	Jay Leno (guest host), Michael Richards, Lynn Redgrave, Roy Blount, Jr.	America
Jay reads an ad in the Hollywood Reporter about Chippendale dancers.
6,004	March 3, 1989	Jay Leno (guest host), Arnold Schwarzenegger, Joanna Kerns, Nigel Havers	N/A
6,005	March 6, 1989	Jay Leno (guest host), Linda Gray, Jamie Lee Curtis	Smokey Robinson
Celebrity Food Items
6,006	March 8, 1989	Bob Newhart, Kevin Meaney	The King's Singers
Computer Memos
6,007	March 9, 1989	Bill Maher, Bert Grantges	Diane Schuur
The FBI Computer Files
6,008	March 10, 1989	Michael Landon, John Mendoza	Thelma Houston
Carson's Believe It or Stuff It
6,009	March 13, 1989	Jay Leno (guest host), Geena Davis, Blake Clark, Timothy Busfield	Randy Newman
6,010	March 15, 1989	Joe Piscopo, Barney Odom and his tree-climbing dog Flat Nose	Perri
When People 'Click Off'
6,011	March 16, 1989	Paul Gertner, Louie Anderson	Gipsy Kings
Edge of Wetness; Foreign Commercials
6,012	March 17, 1989	Oprah Winfrey	The Trinity Irish Dancers
Celebrity Product Logos; Volkswagen Demo
6,013	March 20, 1989	Jay Leno (guest host), Angie Dickinson, Charlton Heston, Penelope Ann Miller	N/A
6,014	March 22, 1989	Julie Krone, Shelley Long	Lyle Lovett
Formations
6,015	March 23, 1989	Chevy Chase, Kevin Pollak	Placido Domingo
Zontar Rather
6,016	March 24, 1989	Bob Hope, David Horowitz	N/A
The Sniveling Weasel Awards
6,017	March 27, 1989	Jay Leno (guest host), Sid Caesar, Franklyn Ajaye, Ernie Hudson	Billy Vera & The Beaters
Letters From Viewers
6,018	March 28, 1989	Jay Leno (guest host), Meredith Baxter Birney, Jeff Altman	Phil Collins
101 Reasons Why The Tonight Show is Better Than Sex
6,019	March 29, 1989	Jay Leno (guest host), Michael Fishman, Jerry Seinfeld	Ricky Van Shelton
Headlines
6,020	March 30, 1989	Jay Leno (guest host), Charlie Sheen, Gene Siskel, Roger Ebert	Crystal Gayle
Unusual Props
6,021	March 31, 1989	Jay Leno (guest host), Tannis Vallely, Cathy Guisewite	Buster Poindexter
April Fool's Day Props

=== April ===
No.	Original release date	Guest(s)	Musical/entertainment guest(s)
6,022	April 3, 1989	Jay Leno (guest host), Anthony Perkins, Dave Coulier	Leon Redbone
Headlines
6,023	April 5, 1989	Jodie Foster, Josephine Burke	Reba McEntire
Stump the Band
6,024	April 6, 1989	Michael Keaton, Ritch Shydner	Joshua Bell (Zigeunerweisen)
State Slogans
6,025	April 7, 1989	Jim Fowler	K.T. Oslin
Homework School of the Air
6,026	April 10, 1989	Jay Leno (guest host), Helen Gurley Brown	Carole King
Headlines
6,027	April 12, 1989	Tony Danza, Calvin Trillin	Pete Fountain
Carnac the Magnificent
6,028	April 13, 1989	Jonathan Winters, Peter Strauss	N/A
Dunk the Dork
6,029	April 14, 1989	Dudley Moore, Jack Mayberry	Etta James & The Roots Band
Flashcards
6,030	April 17, 1989	Jay Leno (guest host), Jim Henson, Tom Brokaw	Loretta Lynn
New Foods
6,031	April 19, 1989	Barry Sobel, Patrick Duffy	Dr. John, Rickie Lee Jones
A takeoff from John Allen Pavlos' book on the Probability of Mathematics.
6,032	April 20, 1989	Tim Conway	Mummenschanz
Mighty Carson Art Players - "David Howitzer - Consumer Supporter"; Expensive Props
6,033	April 21, 1989	Captain Maurice Seddon, Jeff Daniels	Lyle Lovett
Taboos

=== May ===
No.	Original release date	Guest(s)	Musical/entertainment guest(s)
6,034	May 1, 1989	Jay Leno (guest host), Smothers Brothers, Richard Lewis	Alabama
Greeting Cards
6,035	May 3, 1989	Harry Anderson	Aprile Millo ("Musica proibita")
Missing Person Milk Cartons
6,036	May 4, 1989	Buddy Hackett, Brian Gillis	Cowboy Junkies
Airline Restrictions
6,037	May 5, 1989	Bob Saget, Miriam Margolyes, Alex Trebek	N/A
Earthquake Simulation & Johnny welcomes students from Taft High School in Woodland Hills, CA, 1989 Champions of the United States Academic Decathlon. Johnny, Ed & Tommy foolishly take them on in competition.
6,038	May 8, 1989	Jay Leno (guest host), Michele Lee, George Wallace, Craig T. Nelson	N/A
Newspaper Headlines
6,039	May 10, 1989	Sean Lomax	Kenny Rogers
Carson's Handy Hints for Bachelors
6,040	May 11, 1989	Richard Pryor, Rain Pryor, Jake Johannsen	N/A
Audience Genealogy
6,041	May 12, 1989	David Steinberg, Teresa Ganzel	N/A
Mighty Carson Art Players - "Tele-Scam"
6,042	May 17, 1989	Garry Shandling, Patrick Swayze	N/A
What Is a Trillion?
6,043	May 18, 1989	Dottie Byrd, David Horowitz	Emmylou Harris
Carnac the Magnificent
6,044	May 19, 1989	Margaret Whitton, Jeff Cesario	Tony Bennett
Audience Longevity
6,045	May 22, 1989	Jay Leno (guest host), Bob Hope, Erma Bombeck	The Robert Cray Band
6,046	May 24, 1989	Robert Townsend, Sam Kinison	Leningrad Dixieland Jazz Band
Nursery Rhymes
6,047	May 25, 1989	Jim Porter, A. Whitney Brown	Lyle Lovett
Expressions You Never Hear
6,048	May 26, 1989	Sammy Davis, Jr.	Leonard Waxdeck & The Birdcallers
Mighty Carson Art Players - "Carl Sagan"; Expensive Props
6,049	May 29, 1989	Jay Leno (guest host), Carol Leifer, Roy Blount, Jr.	Bonnie Raitt
101 Reasons Why The Tonight Show is Better Than Sex
6,050	May 30, 1989	Jay Leno (guest host), Joan Embery	Jerry Jeff Walker
Jay got a rag to clean his shoes from the hotel.
6,051	May 31, 1989	Jay Leno (guest host), Peter Pitofsky, Alley Mills, Fred Roggin	N/A

=== June ===
No.	Original release date	Guest(s)	Musical/entertainment guest(s)
6,052	June 1, 1989	Jay Leno (guest host), Ann Hodgman, Thomas Hearns, Edie McClurg	N/A
6,053	June 2, 1989	Jay Leno (guest host), Super Dave Osborne, Tim Reid	N/A
Beach Products
6,054	June 5, 1989	Jay Leno (guest host), Paula Poundstone, Leonard Nimoy	10,000 Maniacs ("Trouble Me", "Eat For Two")
6,055	June 7, 1989	Catherine Grant, Pat Hazell, Catherine Hicks	N/A
Joke Rivalries Among the States
6,056	June 8, 1989	Martin Short, Cybill Shepherd	Jeff Healey Band scheduled, bumped due to time running out.
You Are the Author: Johnny presents a romance novel assembled from lines submitted by audience members
6,057	June 9, 1989	Shirley MacLaine	k.d. lang
Cliffhangers
6,058	June 12, 1989	Jay Leno (guest host), Bob Elliott, Chris Elliott, Hugh Downs	Judy Collins
Actual Headlines
6,059	June 14, 1989	Jeff Altman, Helen Shaver	Smokey Robinson
Audience Graduation Address
6,060	June 15, 1989	Dan Aykroyd, Bill Murray, Kevin Meaney	N/A
Audience Graduation Address
6,061	June 16, 1989	Burt Reynolds, Carolyn Freeman	Phoebe Snow
Enlarged Photos
6,062	June 19, 1989	Jay Leno (guest host), John Lithgow, Rita Rudner, Tracy Wells	Nell Carter ("It Breaks My Heart" and "When I Grow Too Old To Dream")
6,063	June 21, 1989	Larry Miller	Alexei Sultanov (Precipitato), Jimmy Buffett
Country Song Titles
6,064	June 22, 1989	Dana Delany, Richard Jeni	Barry Manilow
Collectibles
6,065	June 23, 1989	Frances Herb	Sheena Easton ("The Lover In Me" and "I Wouldn't Beg For Water")
The Tonight Show Country Song
6,066	June 26, 1989	Jay Leno (guest host), Tony Curtis, Pat Morita, Betty Thomas	N/A
Movies That Were Not Blockbusters
6,067	June 27, 1989	Jay Leno (guest host), Cathy Ladman, Fred Roggin	The Neville Brothers
Jay tells a story about the time he went to the janitorial supply store.
6,068	June 28, 1989	Jay Leno (guest host), Saundra Santiago, Bill Maher	N/A
Headlines
6,069	June 29, 1989	Jay Leno (guest host), Mariette Hartley, Ernie Hudson	Al Jarreau ("All My Love")
6,070	June 30, 1989	Jay Leno (guest host), John Chancellor, Jerry Seinfeld	Robert Palmer ("Tell Me I'm Not Dreaming")
Spot Quiz on the Week's Shows

=== July ===
No.	Original release date	Guest(s)	Musical/entertainment guest(s)
6,071	July 10, 1989	Jay Leno (guest host), Tyne Daly, Danny Glover, Thom Sharp	N/A
Movie Posters
6,072	July 12, 1989	Ringo Starr, Kevin Pollak	Sarah Brightman ("Dreamers" and "Wishing You Were Somehow Here Again")
Messages From Home
6,073	July 13, 1989	Victoria Jackson, Bill Engvall	Ricky Skaggs
They Never Said It
6,074	July 14, 1989	Bob Saget, Leo & Mary Hagenstein	Pete Fountain
Car Disclaimer; Blue Cards
6,075	July 17, 1989	Jay Leno (guest host), Al Franken, Tom Davis, Yahoo Serious, Susan Sullivan	David Sanborn
6,076	July 19, 1989	Woody Harrelson, Peter MacNicol, Sunni Black	N/A
The Tonight Show Census
6,077	July 20, 1989	Diane Sawyer	Gary Morris
Historical Myths
6,078	July 21, 1989	Park Overall, Steve Mittleman, Michael Chang	N/A
You Are The Author
6,079	July 24, 1989	Jay Leno (guest host), Donny Osmond, Paula Poundstone, Roy Blount, Jr.	N/A
Actual Newspaper Headlines
6,080	July 26, 1989	Buddy Hackett, Diane Nichols	Joe Williams
Network Slogans
6,081	July 27, 1989	Harvey Korman, Yakov Smirnoff	Bernadette Peters ("Making Love Alone" and "I'm So Lonesome, I Could Cry")
New Products
6,082	July 28, 1989	Father Guido Sarducci, Joseph Gabriel, Robert Wagner	N/A
Zontar Rather
6,083	July 31, 1989	Jay Leno (guest host), Tom Hulce, Carol Siskind, Rain Pryor	Pat Metheny Group
Back To School Items

=== August ===
No.	Original release date	Guest(s)	Musical/entertainment guest(s)
6,084	August 1, 1989	Jay Leno (guest host), Shelley Winters, Jimmy Aleck	N/A
Unusual Ice Cream Flavors
6,085	August 2, 1989	Jay Leno (guest host), Charlton Heston	Michael Johnson
6,086	August 3, 1989	Jay Leno (guest host), Phil Hartman, Jack Palance, John Palmer	N/A
6,086	August 4, 1989	Jay Leno (guest host), Tom Hanks, Carroll O'Connor, Ron Perlman	N/A
Audience Spot Quiz on The Week's Shows
6,087	August 7, 1989	Jay Leno (guest host), Teri Garr, George Miller	Michael Bolton
Actual Newspaper Headlines
6,088	August 9, 1989	Homer E. Williams, Alan King	Maria McKee
Rules of Thumb
6,089	August 10, 1989	George Segal, Richard Jeni	Rosemary Clooney
License Plate Slogans
6,090	August 11, 1989	Paul Reiser, Olivia d'Abo	Randy Travis
Floyd R. Turbo - "Against Aluminum Baseball Bats"
6,091	August 14, 1989	Jay Leno (guest host), Robert Hays, Larry King, Paul Shaffer, Paul Provenza	N/A
6,092	August 16, 1989	Kevin Pollak, Darlanne Fluegel	Julian Lennon ("Mother Mary" and "Now You're In Heaven")
Carnac the Magnificent
6,093	August 17, 1989	Fred Stoller	Muzzie Braun and the Little Braun Brothers
Picking the Zsa Zsa Jury; Video Clips
6,094	August 18, 1989	Tom Selleck	Patti LaBelle
Alphabet Flashcards
6,095	August 29, 1989	Jay Leno (guest host), Rita Rudner, P.J. O'Rourke	B.B. King
6,096	August 30, 1989	Steve Martin, Helen Bullock	k.d. lang
Oprah on TV Guide
6,097	August 31, 1989	David Letterman	Julie Budd ("How Am I Supposed To Live Without You?")
Abe Lincoln Sketch

=== September ===
No.	Original release date	Guest(s)	Musical/entertainment guest(s)
6,098	September 5, 1989	Jay Leno (guest host), Kelly Monteith, Nancy Giles	Richard Marx ("Right Here Waiting")
6,099	September 6, 1989	Garry Shandling	Joshua Bell
Proverbs
6,100	September 7, 1989	James Stewart, Jim Fowler	N/A
Unclaimed Money
6,101	September 8, 1989	Charles Grodin	Dizzy Gillespie
Audience Giveaways
6,102	September 12, 1989	Jay Leno (guest host), Fritz Coleman, John Goodman	Barry Manilow
Newspaper Headlines
6,103	September 13, 1989	Jonathan Winters, Zachary LaVoy	The Temptations
Employee Of The Month
6,104	September 14, 1989	Bob Newhart, Cathy Guisewite	Joe Cocker
25 Preserved Movies; Zsa Zsa Classroom Art
6,105	September 15, 1989	Jane Fonda, Robert Klein	N/A
The National Sleeze
6,106	September 18, 1989	Jay Leno (guest host), Harry Anderson, Bill Maher	George Benson
6,107	September 19, 1989	Jay Leno (guest host), Robert Stack, Judith Light	Tom Jones
TV Pilots That Never Made It
6,108	September 20, 1989	Jay Leno (guest host), Cathy Ladman, Parker Stevenson, Stephanie Beacham	Michael Bolton
6,109	September 21, 1989	Jay Leno (guest host), Bob Hope, Tom Dreesen	Penn & Teller
Unusual Products
6,110	September 22, 1989	Jay Leno (guest host), Paul Reiser, Timothy Busfield, Mykelti Williamson	N/A
Audience Spot Quiz
6,111	September 26, 1989	Jay Leno (guest host), Jamie Lee Curtis, Tracey Ullman, Cloris Leachman	N/A
News Headlines
6,112	September 27, 1989	Florence Hodges, Larry Miller, Jason Bateman	N/A
Messages from Home
6,113	September 28, 1989	Michael Douglas, David Horowitz	Art Garfunkel
Homework School Of The Air
6,114	September 29, 1989	David Steinberg, Jere Burns	The Judds

=== October ===
No.	Original release date	Guest(s)	Musical/entertainment guest(s)
6,115	October 3, 1989	Jay Leno (guest host), Flip Wilson	Mental Cruelty, Dwight Yoakam
6,116	October 4, 1989	Kirstie Alley, Richard Jeni	Simply Red
Rarest Photos
6,117	October 5, 1989	Carl Reiner, Jann Karam, Helen Shaw	N/A
Odd Clippings
6,118	October 6, 1989	Mark Schiff, Park Overall	N/A
Celebrity Products; Expensive Props
6,119	October 10, 1989	Jay Leno (guest host), Lorna Luft, Dom Irrera, Patti D'Arbanville, Stepfanie Kramer	N/A
6,120	October 11, 1989	Candice Bergen, Walt Netschert	Lyle Lovett
White House Workout; Rorshach Tests
6,121	October 12, 1989	Robert Loggia, David Brenner	N/A
Modern Nursery Rhymes
6,122	October 13, 1989	Bill Cosby	Midori (Salut d'Amour, Zapateado)
Survey Questions
6,123	October 23, 1989	Jay Leno (guest host), Rue McClanahan, Roy Blount, Jr.	Clint Black
6,124	October 24, 1989	Jay Leno (guest host), Dennis Weaver, Ellen DeGeneres, Fred Roggin	The Funny Boys
6,125	October 25, 1989	Jay Leno (guest host), Valerie Bertinelli, Jeff Cesario, Cathy Guisewite, Don Yesso	N/A
6,126	October 26, 1989	Bob Newhart, Jay Leno, Darryl Sivad	N/A
Johnny celebrates his 27th anniversary as the host of The Tonight Show.
6,127	October 27, 1989	Jay Leno (guest host), Beau Bridges, John Mendoza	Olivia Newton-John
6,128	October 31, 1989	Jay Leno (guest host), Gregory Jefferson, Edie McClurg	Conway Twitty
Posters For New Movies

=== November ===
No.	Original release date	Guest(s)	Musical/entertainment guest(s)
6,129	November 1, 1989	Jack Lemmon, Steven Wright	N/A
Extension Courses
6,130	November 2, 1989	Roddy McDowall, Nellie McNeal	N/A
Siegfried & Roy Audition; Suggestion Box
6,131	November 3, 1989	Busted Bowlers, James Woods, Bill Maher	N/A
You Are The Author
6,132	November 7, 1989	Jay Leno (guest host), James Belushi, Andrea Martin	N/A
Newspaper Headlines
6,133	November 8, 1989	Oprah Winfrey, Darryl Sivad	Diane Schuur
Real Estate Terminology
6,134	November 9, 1989	Charles Grodin, J.J. Wall, Calvin Trillin	N/A
Carnac the Magnificent
6,135	November 10, 1989	George Burns, Miriam Margolyes	N/A
Edge of Wetness
6,136	November 14, 1989	Jay Leno (guest host), Mary Stuart Masterson, Thom Sharp	Michael Bolton ("How Am I Supposed To Live Without You", "Sittin On The Dock Of The Bay")
Audience Quiz
6,137	November 15, 1989	Bob Uecker, Rita Rudner	Joe Williams
Japanese Tonight Show (Bootleg Tonight Show sketch); Blue Cards
6,138	November 16, 1989	Milton Berle	Etta James and The Roots Band
Celebrity Product Logos
6,139	November 17, 1989	Super Dave Osborne, Richard Pryor	Poco ("Call It Love")
6,140	November 21, 1989	Jay Leno (guest host), Jeff Daniels, Nancy Giles	Andy Williams
Headlines
6,141	November 22, 1989	Carol Siskind	Dolly Parton
Dan Rather Clip; Kids' Thanksgiving Letters
6,142	November 23, 1989	Lea Johnson, Thomas F. Wilson	Melissa Manchester
Genealogy of The Audience
6,143	November 24, 1989	Nancy Reagan, Chevy Chase	Belinda Carlisle

=== December ===
No.	Original release date	Guest(s)	Musical/entertainment guest(s)
6,144	December 5, 1989	Jay Leno (guest host), Ed Begley, Jr.	Judy Collins
Christmas Cards The Tonight Show Received
6,145	December 6, 1989	Jane Pauley, Joe Piscopo	King's Sisters ("The Gift", "Deck The Halls")
The Weather in Malta; Baby's Progress
6,146	December 7, 1989	Paul Reiser, Argus Hamilton, Maggie Jakobson	N/A
Zontar Rather
6,147	December 8, 1989	Danny DeVito	Al Green
Santa's Naughty or Nice List
6,148	December 12, 1989	Jay Leno (guest host), Fred Savage, Kevin Pollak	Regina Belle
Actual Newspaper Headlines
6,149	December 13, 1989	Buddy Hackett	Gary Morris
Children's Letters to Santa Claus
6,150	December 14, 1989	Michael Palin, Jon Serl	Restless Heart ("Fast Movin' Train")
New Products
6,151	December 15, 1989	Bob Hope, Kevin Meaney, Liv Ullmann	N/A
Celebrity Christmas Albums; The Twelve Days of Christmas (as sung by Johnny, Ed, and Doc)
6,152	December 26, 1989	Jay Leno (guest host), Phil Hartman, Joe Penny	Lou Rawls
Christmas Gifts That Didn't Do So Well
6,153	December 27, 1989	James Stewart, Larry Miller, Gladys Farek	N/A
Gift Videos
6,154	December 28, 1989	Dana Carvey, Sam Kinison	Pete Fountain
Chia Pet Competition; Fruitcake Demolition Clip
6,155	December 29, 1989	Tim Conway, Park Overall	Daniel Menendez
Missing Chia Pets; Viewer Letter; Psychic Prediction
