= List of The Tonight Show Starring Johnny Carson episodes (1992) =

- No. of episodes: 74

Release
- Original network: NBC

Season chronology
- ← Previous; 1991 episodes Next → Season 1993

The following is a list of episodes of the television series The Tonight Show Starring Johnny Carson which aired in 1992. In October, 1962 Johnny Carson took over as host of the show from the previous host Jack Paar.

== 1992 ==
=== January ===
| No. | Original release date | Guest(s) | Musical/entertainment guest(s) |
|---|---|---|---|
| 4,458 | January 1, 1992 | Jay Leno (guest host), Susan Lucci, Ned Beatty, Michael Richards, Dave Barry | N/A |
Kids' Resolutions
| 4,459 | January 2, 1992 | Jay Leno (guest host), Carl Weathers, Jeff Stillman | N/A |
Police Blotter
| 4,460 | January 3, 1992 | Jay Leno (guest host), Peter Weller, Tommy Davidson | N/A |
Trapezoid Quiz
| 4,461 | January 7, 1992 | Jay Leno (guest host), Danny Glover, Dinah Manoff | Eddie Money |
| 4,462 | January 8, 1992 | Katie Couric, Larry Miller | Jim Hall |
New Year's Resolutions
| 4,463 | January 9, 1992 | Tim Conway, Jeff Dunham | Dianne Reeves |
Psychic Predictions
| 4,464 | January 10, 1992 | David Steinberg, Drew Carey, Regis Philbin | N/A |
Blue Cards
| 4,465 | January 14, 1992 | Jay Leno (guest host), Kevin Costner, Cybill Shepherd, Dennis Farina | Kenny Loggins |
| 4,466 | January 15, 1992 | Christian Slater, Paula Poundstone | Yo-Yo Ma, Bobby McFerrin |
Expressions You Never Hear
| 4,467 | January 16, 1992 | Keenen Ivory Wayans, Jimmy Brogan, Gene Siskel, Roger Ebert | N/A |
Differences Between Men and Women
| 4,468 | January 17, 1992 | Jeremy Irons, Louie Anderson, Baxter Black | N/A |
Stump the Band
| 4,469 | January 28, 1992 | Jay Leno (guest host), Hal Roach, Tom Skerritt, Ken Burns | Boyz II Men |
Elvis Sighting
| 4,470 | January 29, 1992 | Melanie Griffith, Tim Allen, William Wegman | N/A |
Conversation with The Audience
| 4,471 | January 30, 1992 | Michael J. Fox, Mark Schiff, Jim Courier | Trisha Yearwood ("That's What I Like About You" and "The Woman Before Me") |
| 4,472 | January 31, 1992 | Kevin Bacon, Wayne Cotter, Amanda Plummer | N/A |
Zero Gravity Experiments

=== February ===
| No. | Original release date | Guest(s) | Musical/entertainment guest(s) |
|---|---|---|---|
| 4,473 | February 4, 1992 | Jay Leno (guest host), Brian Keith, Joey Lawrence, John McLaughlin | N/A |
| 4,474 | February 5, 1992 | Bob Newhart, Carol Leifer | Bela Fleck & The Flecktones |
What I Want From The President
| 4,475 | February 6, 1992 | Sean Connery, Jack Coen | Richard Marx |
Stump the Band
| 4,476 | February 7, 1992 | John Riggi, Edie McClurg | Larry Gatlin |
Blue Cards
| 4,477 | February 11, 1992 | Jay Leno (guest host), William Devane, Elizabeth Ashley | Marc Cohn |
| 4,478 | February 13, 1992 | Billy Connolly, Richard Jeni | Reba McEntire |
In An Average Life
| 4,479 | February 14, 1992 | Catfish Gray, Jake Johannsen | Nils Lofgren |
Light My Fire
| 4,480 | February 18, 1992 | Jay Leno (guest host), Maria Shriver, George Wallace, Professor Cassidy | N/A |
Japanese Products That Failed
| 4,481 | February 19, 1992 | Jim Fowler, Dudley Moore | Louie Bellson |
Carnac the Magnificent
| 4,482 | February 20, 1992 | Chevy Chase, Smothers Brothers | N/A |
Stump the Band
| 4,483 | February 21, 1992 | Elizabeth Taylor, Michael Douglas | N/A |
Blue Cards
| 4,484 | February 24, 1992 | Jay Leno (guest host), Mary-Kate Olsen, Ashley Olsen, Marion Ross | N/A |
| 4,485 | February 25, 1992 | Jay Leno (guest host), Diane Ladd, Ian Ziering, Jeff Stilson | N/A |
| 4,486 | February 26, 1992 | Jay Leno (guest host), Meredith Baxter, John Spencer | Shelby Lynne |
Albums
| 4,487 | February 27, 1992 | Jay Leno (guest host), John Chancellor, Billy Bragg, Erma Bombeck | N/A |
| 4,488 | February 28, 1992 | Jay Leno (guest host), Mark Harmon, Jack Palance | N/A |
Trapezoid Quiz

=== March ===
| No. | Original release date | Guest(s) | Musical/entertainment guest(s) |
|---|---|---|---|
| 4,489 | March 3, 1992 | Jay Leno (guest host), Brian Dennehy, Jeff Altman | Vanessa Williams |
| 4,490 | March 4, 1992 | Tom Hanks, Mercedes Ruehl | Al Green |
Life's Little Instruction Book
| 4,491 | March 5, 1992 | Don Rickles, Calvin Trillin | Five Guys Named Moe |
Blue Cards
| 4,492 | March 6, 1992 | Richard Benjamin | James Taylor |
Recycling Household Items
| 4,493 | March 10, 1992 | Jay Leno (guest host), Warren Beatty | Sophie B. Hawkins |
| 4,494 | March 11, 1992 | Tony Danza, Paul Gertner | Pete Fountain |
You Are The Author
| 4,495 | March 12, 1992 | Burt Reynolds, Pete Barbutti, Ahmad Rashad | N/A |
Children's Letters to Johnny Carson
| 4,496 | March 13, 1992 | Bob Hope, Martin Mull, Teresa Ganzel | N/A |
Mighty Carson Art Players - "Tea Time Movie"
| 4,497 | March 17, 1992 | Jay Leno (guest host), Geena Davis, Pierce Brosnan | N/A |
Check Bouncers
| 4,498 | March 18, 1992 | Marilu Henner, Kevin Pollak | Randy Travis |
St. Patrick's Day Toasts
| 4,499 | March 19, 1992 | Richard Lewis, Susie Loucks | Leon Redbone |
Blue Cards
| 4,500 | March 20, 1992 | Woody Harrelson, Blake Clark, Cathy Guisewite | N/A |
Tonight Show Exit Poll
| 4,501 | March 23, 1992 | Jay Leno (guest host), Michael Jeter | Roxette |
| 4,502 | March 24, 1992 | Jay Leno (guest host), Jonathan Ross | Pam Tillis |
Headlines
| 4,503 | March 25, 1992 | Jay Leno (guest host), Willem Dafoe, Norman Lear | N/A |
| 4,504 | March 26, 1992 | Jay Leno (guest host), Christopher Reeve, Melissa Gilbert-Brinkman | Mr. Big ("To Be With You") |
Congratulations to Victor Christen - 103 Years Old
| 4,505 | March 27, 1992 | Jay Leno (guest host), Armand Assante, Stone Phillips | Bronx Style Bob |
Trapezoid Quiz
| 4,506 | March 31, 1992 | Jay Leno (guest host), Jack Palance, Richard Dean Anderson | Celine Dion |
Movie Posters

=== April ===
| No. | Original release date | Guest(s) | Musical/entertainment guest(s) |
|---|---|---|---|
| 4,507 | April 1, 1992 | Patrick Swayze, David Horowitz | Steve Lawrence |
Prop Giveaway (Certificate of Authenticity); PR Slogans
| 4,508 | April 2, 1992 | Craig T. Nelson, Bob Costas | Michael Crawford ("The Music of the Night") |
Prop Giveaway (Swiss Army Knife); Buttocks Descriptions
| 4,509 | April 3, 1992 | Charles Grodin, John Mendoza | k.d. lang |
Prop Giveaway (Hussein A Flush); Blue Cards
| 4,510 | April 7, 1992 | Jay Leno (guest host), Cybill Shepherd, Chris Noth, Lisa Taylor | Mark Chesnutt |
| 4,511 | April 8, 1992 | Emma Thompson, Steven Wright | Dolly Parton |
Floyd R. Turbo - Rebuttal
| 4,512 | April 9, 1992 | James Woods, Ted Koppel | Stevie Wonder |
Talk with Doc
| 4,513 | April 10, 1992 | Arnold Schwarzenegger, John Bowman | Little Village |
El Mouldo
| 4,514 | April 14, 1992 | Jay Leno (guest host), John Goodman, Dick Clark | Chic |
| 4,515 | April 15, 1992 | Rodney Dangerfield, Beau Bridges | Bernadette Peters ("Come Rain Or Come Shine" and "What'll I Do") |
Graduating The Audience
| 4,516 | April 16, 1992 | Tom Selleck, John McEnroe | Ray Charles |
Prop Giveaway (Nathan Hall sweater, Napoleon's bathing trunks, giant finger)
| 4,517 | April 17, 1992 | Don Johnson, Amanda Plummer | Christopher Parkening |
Final Prop Spot with Asteroid
| 4,518 | April 28, 1992 | Jerry Seinfeld, Carl Reiner | B.B. King ("The Blues Come Over Me" and "I'm Moving On") |
Walter Cronkite Sketch (sketch from 1981)
| 4,519 | April 29, 1992 | Bill Cosby, Bob Saget | Harry Connick, Jr. ("He Is As They Are") |
Bar Room Brawl Sketch (from 1968) (4/30/92 & 5/1/92 pre-empted for NBC News coverage of Los Angeles riots)

=== May ===
| No. | Original release date | Guest(s) | Musical/entertainment guest(s) |
|---|---|---|---|
| 4,520 | May 5, 1992 | Jonathan Winters, Dame Edna Everage | Jimmy Buffett ("Money Back Guarantee") |
Performing Bird Montage
| 4,521 | May 6, 1992 | Steve Martin, Farrah Fawcett | The Temptations (Medley "The Way You Do The Things You Do", "Ain't Too Proud to Beg", "Ball Of Confusion", and "My Girl") |
Tarzan Sketch (from 1981)
| 4,522 | May 7, 1992 | Madeline Kahn, Buddy Hackett | Diane Schuur ("Ev'ry Time We Say Goodbye") |
Playback of Sketches (Patton and Doc/Thanksgiving)
| 4,523 | May 8, 1992 | Garry Shandling, George Foreman | N/A |
Playback of Who's On First, Pies, and Pie Outtakes
| 4,524 | May 12, 1992 | Bob Newhart, Magic Johnson | Lyle Lovett |
Playback of Comic President
| 4,525 | May 13, 1992 | George Carlin, Liv Ullmann | Gloria Estefan - "Nayib's Song (I Am Here for You)" |
Playback- Sports Montage
| 4,526 | May 14, 1992 | Michael Keaton, Martin Short, Teri Garr | N/A |
Copper Clappers/Jack Webb Sketch (from 1968)
| 4,527 | May 15, 1992 | Clint Eastwood, David Letterman, Bob Hope | N/A |
Thesaurus Writers Funeral (from 1990)
| 4,528 | May 19, 1992 | Mel Brooks, Jack Lemmon | Tony Bennett performed ("I'll Be Seeing You" and "I Left My Heart In San Francisco") |
Playback of Commercial Blackouts - 'Range Top Stuffing', 'Colonel Sanders', 'Karl Malden/Hot Tub', 'Old Splice', 'Yodel Hills', and 'Underalls'
| 4,529 | May 20, 1992 | Roseanne Arnold, Richard Harris | N/A |
Playback - Johnny as Willie Nelson and Julio Iglesias
| 4,530 | May 21, 1992 | Robin Williams | Bette Midler ("Miss Otis Regrets", "You Made Me Love You", "Here's That Rainy Day" and "One For My Baby and One More For The Road") |
Playback - Ed Ames tomahawk throw (April 27, 1965)
| 4,531 | May 22, 1992 | None | N/A |
Series Finale, Clips of Past Episodes
