= Thanks (film) =

- Directed by: Martin Bergman
- Written by: Martin Bergman
- Produced by: Martin Bergman; Sam Friedlander
- Starring: Paul Dooley; Rita Rudner
- Cinematography: Jesse Eisenhardt
- Edited by: Jesse Wheeler
- Music by: Brian Lohmann
- Production company: Ritmar Productions
- Release date: January 7, 2011 (Palm Springs)
- Running time: 90 minutes
- Country: United States

Thanks is a 2011 American comedy film directed by Martin Bergman and starring Paul Dooley and Rita Rudner. The film premiered at the 2011 Palm Springs International Film Festival.

== Premise ==
Thanks is a Thanksgiving comedy set over three Thanksgivings spent at a California beach. Three adult children respond to their father remarrying a much younger woman as America and the world respond to the tumultuous 2008 economic upheaval.

== Cast ==
- Paul Dooley as Hank
- Rita Rudner as Bunny
- Steve Purnick as Steve
- Brian Lohmann as Brian
- Edi Patterson as Edi
- Kelly Holden as Kelly
