= Peter's Friends =

- Directed by: Kenneth Branagh
- Written by: Rita Rudner; Martin Bergman
- Produced by: Kenneth Branagh
- Starring: Stephen Fry; Kenneth Branagh; Alphonsia Emmanuel; Hugh Laurie; Imelda Staunton; Emma Thompson; Rita Rudner
- Cinematography: Roger Lanser
- Edited by: Andrew Marcus
- Production company: Channel Four Films
- Distributed by: Entertainment Film Distributors
- Release dates: 18 September 1992 (Toronto); 13 November 1992
- Running time: 101 minutes
- Country: United Kingdom
- Language: English
- Budget: $5 million
- Box office: $7.2 million

Peter's Friends is a 1992 British comedy film directed and produced by Kenneth Branagh, and written by Rita Rudner and Martin Bergman.

The film follows six friends (played by Stephen Fry, Branagh, Alphonsia Emmanuel, Hugh Laurie, Imelda Staunton and Emma Thompson), members of an acting troupe who graduated from Cambridge University in 1982 and went their separate ways. Ten years later, Peter inherits a large estate from his father and invites the group to spend the New Year's holiday with him.

== Plot ==
Peter and his five friends act together in a Cambridge University student comedy troupe. They are shown performing on New Year's Eve, ringing in 1983 for Peter's father and his own group of middle-aged friends at the family's country estate. The stodgy partygoers are underwhelmed by the stylings of Peter and his friends, whose only supporters seem to be the family housekeeper, Vera, and her young son, Paul.

Ten years later, Peter has recently inherited the family estate, and invites his friends up for the 1992-1993 New Year's weekend.

Peter's friends are Andrew, now a writer in Hollywood; married jingle writers Roger and Mary; glamorous costume designer Sarah; and eccentric Maggie, who works in publishing. Joining them are Carol, Andrew's American TV star wife; and impolite Brian, Sarah's very recently acquired, and still married, lover. Vera, and the now grown Paul, are still at the estate, though Vera has given their notice, intending to leave immediately after the weekend, as Peter plans to sell the house after this last party.

Andrew and Carol's marriage is strained by the demands of her fame, made worse by Mary's inappropriate mention that Andrew and Sarah had been engaged a decade earlier. Roger and Mary are recovering from a devastating personal tragedy, made more difficult by Mary ringing home every few minutes and by Brian suddenly talking at length about using the couple's twins in one of their commercials, which leads to the revelation (to Brian, and the audience) that one of the toddler twins died nine months earlier. Lonely Maggie is determined to persuade Peter they should be more than just friends, and Sarah is not as happy with her life as she appears.

The weekend does not go as planned. After a failed attempt to seduce Peter, where he reveals he is bisexual but no longer sleeping with either sex, Maggie receives a makeover from Carol and successfully seduces Paul. Carol leaves Andrew and returns to America, and after a year of sobriety Andrew returns to the bottle. Roger and Mary reach an emotional breakthrough, share their grief and address her obsessive overprotection of their remaining child. Brian calls his wife, who comes to pick him up, after he realizes that Sarah is not interested in that which she already has, but only in that which belongs to someone else. In the climax of the film, Peter reveals the real reason for his bringing them all together: he is HIV-positive. The friends emerge from their own problems and pledge their assistance to Peter.

== Cast ==
- Hugh Laurie as Roger Anderson
- Kenneth Branagh as Andrew Benson
- Stephen Fry as Peter Morton
- Alphonsia Emmanuel as Sarah Johnson
- Emma Thompson as Maggie Chester
- Imelda Staunton as Mary Anderson
- Phyllida Law as Vera
- Rita Rudner as Carol Benson
- Tony Slattery as Brian
- Alex Lowe as Paul
- Richard Briers as Lord Morton

== Production and casting ==
Most of the cast are actually old university friends or have previously collaborated in other films. Hugh Laurie, Stephen Fry, Emma Thompson and Tony Slattery attended the University of Cambridge and had been members of the Cambridge Footlights, a student comedy troupe similar to the one portrayed in the film, at the same time. Co-writer Martin Bergman (husband of co-writer/star Rita Rudner) also attended Cambridge and was a member of the Footlights.

Prior to filming, Fry and Laurie were already a successful double act with TV series A Bit of Fry & Laurie and Jeeves and Wooster. At the time the film was made, Branagh was married to Thompson, who had also dated Laurie during their university days. Phyllida Law is Thompson's mother and along with Richard Briers, Imelda Staunton and Alex Lowe appeared with Branagh and Thompson in Branagh's adaptation of Much Ado About Nothing the following year. More than a decade later Fry, Law and Slattery appeared together in the ITV series Kingdom.

Filming took place at Wrotham Park in Hertfordshire. The central character of Peter is said to have been partly inspired by Nicholas Eden, the son of former British Prime Minister Anthony Eden who was diagnosed with HIV/AIDS after inheriting his father's titles.

== Soundtrack ==
The soundtrack featured many artists from the 1980s, including Tears for Fears (whose song "Everybody Wants to Rule the World" was heard over the opening credits of the film), Eric Clapton, The Pretenders, Daryl Braithwaite, Kiri Te Kanawa and Bruce Springsteen.

The soundtrack album did not, however, feature the cast's rendition of the Jerome Kern standard "The Way You Look Tonight", as performed in the film nor the song, "Orpheus on the Underground", by John Hudson, which features at the beginning and end of the film.

== Reception ==
=== Box office ===
Peter's Friends grossed £3.1 million in the United Kingdom, and grossed over $4 million in the USA.

=== Critical response ===
Peter's Friends was well received by most critics. On Rotten Tomatoes it has an approval rating of 65% based on reviews from 37 critics.

Roger Ebert, film critic of the Chicago Sun-Times, described the film as "more or less predictable", but awarded it three-and-a-half stars, stating, "The structure of Peter's Friends is not blazingly original - The Big Chill comes instantly to mind - but a movie like this succeeds in its particulars. If the dialogue is witty, if the characters are convincingly funny or sad, if there is the right bittersweet nostalgia and the sense that someone is likely to burst into 'Those Were the Days,' then it doesn't matter that we've seen the formula before. This is a new weekend with new friends."

Critic James Berardinelli gave the film a mixed review, giving it two-and-a-half out of a possible four stars and stating, "At its best, Peter's Friends is warm, touching, and funny. At its worst, it's annoying and preachy. Fortunately, there are a few more moments in the former category than in the latter." While praising Branagh's direction and performances by the cast, Berardinelli attributed most of his discontent to the film's screenplay, concluding, "This is Branagh's worst effort to date and shows, if nothing else, that no matter how talented the director and his cast, he still needs a decent screenplay. And that, ultimately, is where Peter's Friends falls short."

=== Accolades ===
Peter's Friends was nominated for a Goya Award and won two Evening Standard British Film Awards. It also ranked in eighth place on the National Board of Review's Top Ten 1992 films.

Award	Category	Recipients	Result
Evening Standard British Film Awards	Best Actress	Emma Thompson	Won
Evening Standard British Film Awards	Peter Sellers Award for Comedy	Kenneth Branagh	Won
Goya Awards	Best European Film	Kenneth Branagh	Nominated
