= I Am Comic =

- Directed by: Jordan Brady
- Written by: Jordan Brady; Ritch Shydner
- Starring: Ritch Shydner; Sarah Silverman; Phyllis Diller; Janeane Garofalo; Lewis Black; Louis C.K. Roseanne Barr; Jim Gaffigan; Tommy Davidson; Dana Gould; Tim Allen; Wayne Federman; Carlos Mencia; Carrot Top; Margaret Cho; Brody Stevens; Bobcat Goldthwait; Jeff Foxworthy; Kathy Griffin; Jimmy Dore; Greg Giraldo
- Narrated by: Ritch Shydner
- Cinematography: Jeanne Lipsey; Joe C. Maxwell
- Edited by: Karoliina Tuovinen
- Music by: David Reynolds
- Distributed by: IFC Films
- Release date: January 28, 2010 (Slamdance)
- Running time: 87 minutes
- Country: United States
- Language: English

I Am Comic is a 2010 documentary about the stand-up comedy world directed by Jordan Brady.

== Overview ==
Directed by former stand-up comic Jordan Brady and starring and narrated by ex-comedian turned comedy writer Ritch Shydner, the film explores the world of stand-up comedy and features interviews with some of the top comedians working today.

The film had its world premiere at the 2010 Slamdance Film Festival and is distributed by Monterey Media and IFC Films.

== Festivals ==
I Am Comic has been screened at the following film festivals:

- Feel Good Film Festival
- Laugh Your Ashville Off Comedy Festival
- Just For Laughs
- Cinefamily's Comedy Festival
- Little Rock Film Festival
- Slamdance
- Bridgetown Comedy Festival
- Atlanta Film Festival
- Kansas City Jubilee
- James River Film Festival
- Laugh Factory
