= Dad's Week Off =

- VHS cover
- Genre: Comedy
- Teleplay by: Neal Israel
- Story by: Robert Kosberg
- Directed by: Neal Israel
- Starring: Henry Winkler; Olivia d'Abo; Richard Jeni
- Music by: Marc Bonilla
- Country of origin: United States
- Original language: English

Production
- Executive producer: David Jablin
- Producer: Robert Frederick
- Cinematography: Jan Kiesser
- Editor: Tom Walls
- Running time: 95 minutes
- Production companies: Showtime Networks; Paramount Television

Original release
- Network: Showtime
- Release: March 29, 1997

National Lampoon's Dad's Week Off is a 1997 American comedy television film written and directed by Neal Israel, based on a story by Robert Kosberg, and starring Henry Winkler, Olivia d'Abo, and Richard Jeni. It premiered on Showtime on March 29, 1997.

== Plot ==
A computer salesman charged with marketing a tiny computer that no one can operate, faces hypertension when he realizes that there is no way to sell the product and he is likely to lose his job. So he can get some rest, his wife offers to take their two kids camping for a week. When his fellow salesman and best friend is fired and thrown out of his house by his wife, he moves in and immediately starts unending parties, which ultimately ends up the house on fire and Winkler arrested on multiple charges. In between, in a drug-induced stupor, he gets mixed up with a ditzy blonde who wants to marry him, and rescue her child from being raised by her parents.

== Cast ==
- Henry Winkler as Jack Potter
- Olivia d'Abo as Cherice
- Richard Jeni as Bernie
- Justin Louis as Chip
- Ken Pogue as Emmett Sharpel
- Wendel Meldrum as Lew
- Don S. Davis as Hank
- Colleen Winton as Gayle Sharpel
- Miguelito Macario Andaluz as Lew
- Yee Jee Tso as Kea
- Jerry Wasserman as Detective
- Christine Willes as Alice
- Adrian Hughes as Bob, Brother #2
- John R. Taylor as Minister
- Will Sasso as Pete
- Laurie McLay as Pauline
- Mark Acheson as Sobbing Man
- Robert Frederick as Sandy, the Lawyer
- Michael Kopsa as Cop
- Lossen Chambers as Lolita
- Fred Henderson as Doctor
- Eric Pospisil as Nicholas
- Kaitlyn Burke as Rebecca
- Patrick Pon as Fang Leader
- Don MacKay as Mr. Mendelson
- Charles Siegel as Sam
- Ernie Prentice as Old Golf Man
- April Telek as Bikini Girl
- Ken Lowther as Uncle Morty
