= John Suter =

American sled-dog racer

John Suter (born 1949 or 1950) is a retired American sled dog racer most notable for having mushed standard poodles in various sled races, including the Iditarod. His use of poodles led directly to new and current Iditarod rules that stipulate what breeds of dogs are qualified to race.

== Racing career ==
Suter grew up in California and eventually joined the military. While serving in the United States Army as a biathlon team member in the 1970s, he was stationed in Alaska. There, according to an interview he gave in the Washington Post, he saw a miniature poodle running to keep up with his snowmobile. He said that was where he got the idea to race poodles.

Suter bought a number of standard poodles and raised them side by side with huskies in order to prepare them as sled dogs. The poodles, Suter claims, learned to imitate the huskies and developed a drive for running. Suter eventually raced poodles and poodle mixes in hundreds of dog sled races. He routinely placed in the low middle of competing mushers. Suter claims that the advantage of mushing poodles is that they will notice if the musher falls off the sled, turn around, and retrieve their driver. Other breeds of racing dogs are known to keep racing after their musher has fallen off the sled. In 1988, Suter went on the Tonight Show to talk about his poodle racers.

Suter bred several generations of poodles, leading up to his entrance into the Iditarod. He completed the race, approximately a week later than the winner. His poodles stood up well to the cold, their fur having grown naturally. Suter protected his dogs' paws with booties and by spraying them with cooking spray. In his interviews, Suter said he never aspired to win his races, just to complete them with poodles.
