= Jordan Brady =

American director

- Born: 10 August 1964 (age 62); United States
- Occupations: Film director, Writer, Actor

Jordan Brady (born August 10, 1964 in Mount Vernon, Ohio) is an American director. He was a professional stand-up comic, and later played small roles in many TV shows including Baywatch and Who's the Boss.

Brady wrote and directed the feature film Dill Scallion. He directed the films Confessions of an American Girl, Waking Up in Reno, The Third Wheel and Maria Bamford's The Special Special Special! TV special.

He also created a trilogy of documentary films about the art and occupational hazards of stand-up comedy. The first was 2010's I Am Comic. The second, I Am Road Comic, was released April 30, 2014, as a follow-up documentary. The third was I Am Battle Comic, about stand-up comedy for the US troops in Iraq, Afghanistan and Kuwait.

Brady has been a game show host three times; his shows include MTV's Turn It Up!, the lone episode of Grill Me, and the 1990s NBC series Name Your Adventure, for which he also served as director and producer.

Brady's podcast "Respect the Process" is about filmmaking in the context of commercials and web content.

The cultural catchphrase bow-chicka-wow-wow, a shorthand for the style of 1970s-era pornographic film soundtracks, originates from a stand-up routine Brady worked in the late 1980s and early 1990s.
