= Turn It Up! =

- Presented by: Jordan Brady
- Narrated by: Stuffy Shmitt

Production
- Running time: 30 minutes
- Production company: Chauncey Street Productions

Original release
- Network: MTV
- Release: June 30 – December 7, 1990

Turn It Up! is a musical game show that aired on MTV from June 30 to December 7, 1990. It was the second game show to be produced and broadcast on the network after Remote Control, produced by Albie Hecht, Alan Goodman, and Fred Seibert, of Chauncey Street Productions in New York City.

The series was hosted by Jordan Brady with Stuffy Shmitt as co-host and announcer.

== Gameplay ==
The show, co-hosted by comedian Jordan Brady and musician Stuffy Shmitt, features contestants competing to answer trivia questions about music.

=== Rounds 1 and 2 ===
In each round, four categories each with three point values (10, 20 & 30 points) were displayed on a video wall. The player in control selected a category, then host Brady asked a question. The first player to ring-in had a chance to answer. A correct answer added the chosen points to the score, and chose another category, but an incorrect answer gave the opponents a chance to answer.

Round one was played with normal music questions, while round two was played with audio/video clips using the video wall.

Regular categories in round 2 include:

Total Recall: Contestants are shown thirty seconds of a music video. After the clip was played, the players were asked questions about the video.

Sing This: Contestants must sing the next verse after a music video stopped.

Say What?: Contestants have to repeat the lyrics the singer sang in the music video.

Talk Radio: An audio clip of an interview was played (the video featured a VU meter). Contestants must identify the artist.

Spare Parts: A portion of a photograph of an artist was shown and Brady reads a clue about the artist.

Pick a Player: A member of the band asks a question about musicians who play the same instrument as he/she does.

Scratch 'N Lick: DJ Jazzy Joyce scratches a song on her turntable, the contestant must identify the name of the song.

During the round, a horn playing the Charge fanfare would sound, indicating one minute of gameplay remained for the round. The round ended when all 12 questions were asked or if time ran out (the band would play the theme song, signaling the round's end).

The two high-scorers at the end of round two went on to play the final round, "Add-A-Track."

=== Add-A-Track (Final round) ===
In the final round, the two surviving players listened to four songs for two minutes (30 seconds per song). On each song, only one musical instrument played the song, with a new one added every five seconds. The player rang in once he/she thought they could identify the song. If correct, that player earned the points plus a prize; if wrong, the opposing player got a chance to answer.

Each song had a different point value:

- 1st song - 25 points
- 2nd song - 50 points
- 3rd song - 75 points
- 4th song - 100 points

The scores from the previous two rounds were not carried over until after the round was over, at which point the scores from the Add-A-Track round were added to the scores from the other two rounds. The player with a most points won the game and a prize. In addition, if a player had correctly identified all four songs in the Add-A-Track round, he/she won a grand prize.
