= Martin Bergman =

British producer, writer and director

Martin Bergman (born 17 June 1957) is a British producer, writer and director who works in Hollywood.

After graduating from Cambridge University in 1979, Bergman produced several live arena shows with his Australian partner Michael Edgley, including the world tour of ice skaters Torvill and Dean. He also produced several comedy shows in Australia, Britain and the USA.

Bergman married the American comedian Rita Rudner in 1988. They have written several films, plays and TV projects together. Bergman has also directed some of these projects, and Bergman's company has produced many of his wife's shows, most notably her Las Vegas residency which sold almost two million tickets over a multi-year run. They have a daughter Molly and the three of them divide their time between homes in Southern California.
