= Homeroom (TV series) =

American sitcom

- Genre: Sitcom
- Created by: Andrew Scheinman; Gary Gilbert
- Directed by: Linda Day; Arlando Smith
- Starring: Darryl Sivad; Penny Johnson; Bill Cobbs
- Opening theme: "Love Each Other (The Solution)" performed by the Dimples
- Country of origin: United States
- Original language: English
- No. of seasons: 1
- No. of episodes: 13 (3 unaired)

Production
- Executive producers: Andrew Scheinman; Gary Gilbert; Topper Carew
- Producers: David S. Cohen; Roger S.H. Schulman; Darryl Sivad
- Camera setup: Multi-camera
- Running time: 30 minutes
- Production companies: Giggling Goose Productions; Castle Rock Entertainment

Original release
- Network: ABC
- Release: September 16 – December 17, 1989

Homeroom is an American sitcom that aired on ABC from September 16 to December 17, 1989. The series stars stand-up comedian Darryl Sivad as a fourth grade teacher at an inner-city school, Langford Academy. ABC executives created the show as a vehicle for Sivad after seeing his routine on The Tonight Show Starring Johnny Carson.

== Premise ==
The series follows Darryl Harper (Sivad), a highly paid advertising copywriter who decides to quit his job to teach underprivileged kids at P.S. 391, an inner city school in New York City. Darryl's wife Virginia (Penny Johnson) supports his choice but Virginia's father, Phil Drexler (Bill Cobbs) does not. Phil frequently voices his disapproval to Darryl that he feels is his right as Darryl and Virginia live rent-free in the brownstone Phil owns and also lives in.

== Cast ==
- Darryl Sivad as Darryl Harper
- Penny Johnson as Virginia "Vicki" Harper
- Bill Cobbs as Phil Drexler
- Trent Cameron as Sam
- Jahary Bennett as Devon
- Billy Dee Willis as Donald

== Reception and cancellation ==
Homeroom premiered on ABC on September 16, 1989, to mixed reviews. The series was scheduled on Sunday nights opposite CBS's hit series Murder, She Wrote and NBC's My Two Dads. As a result, Homeroom struggled in the ratings and faced cancellation. In an effort to save the series, the cast and producers asked viewers to start a letter writing campaign. Executive producer Topper Carew went on a cross-country promotional tour to schools where he showed the series to students and teachers and held a Q&A session afterwards. Carew also mailed letters and contacted African-American organizations and activists asking them to watch the show and to talk about it. Despite the cast and producers' efforts, ABC canceled the series in December 1989. Three of the thirteen episodes produced were never aired.

== Episodes ==
No.	Title	Directed by	Written by	Original release date
1	"Pilot"	Art Wolff	Gary Gilbert & Andrew Scheinman	September 16, 1989
The kids cheat at a big math test.
2	"The Lookin' for West Coast Travelin' 'Long the Missouri River Blues"	Linda Day	David X. Cohen & Roger S. H. Schulman	September 24, 1989
Donald takes piano lessons. Anthony gets dumped by his girlfriend.
3	"Food for Thought"	Arlando Smith	Marc Cherry & Jamie Wooten	October 1, 1989
The manager for the cafeteria gets tired of Donald's misbehavior.
4	"It's Not Easy Bein' Green"	Linda Day	Marc Cherry & Jamie Wooten	October 8, 1989
A tree is left in Devon's care, but the tree dies because of lack of water. Virginia tries to help Phil with his high blood pressure.
5	"Dirty Laundry"	Linda Day	Trish Soodik	October 22, 1989
Lisa and Devon run for class president.
6	"Who Is Captain Fitness?"	Linda Day	Marc Cherry & Jamie Wooten	November 5, 1989
Sam's hero, Captain Fitness, dies during a classroom workout.
7	"Dinner at Fiveish"	Linda Day	Trish Soodik	November 19, 1989
Phil goes out with a colleague of Darryl.
8	"The Commercial Break"	Unknown	David Cohen & Roger S.H. Schulman	December 3, 1989
Anthony directs his first commercial. The kids find out that Darryl was once a practical joker.
9	"Mr. Drexler's Neighborhood"	Linda Day	Paul B. Price & Stephen Nathan	December 10, 1989
Phil tries to teach the kids in Darryl's class about the streets in the neighborhood.
10	"He Ain't Heavy, He's My Brother, Sister"	Arlando Smith	Trish Soodik	December 17, 1989
Darryl lets Lisa direct a school play based on her contest-winning script.
11	"Who'll Be My Role Model Now That My Role Model Is Gone?"	Tony Singletary	David Cohen & Roger S.H. Schulman	UNAIRED
12	"The Visitor"	Linda Day	David Cohen & Roger S.H. Schulman	UNAIRED
13	"The Mom Who Came to Dinner"	Linda Day	Marc Cherry & Jamie Wooten	UNAIRED
