= Wayne Cotter =

American stand-up comedian

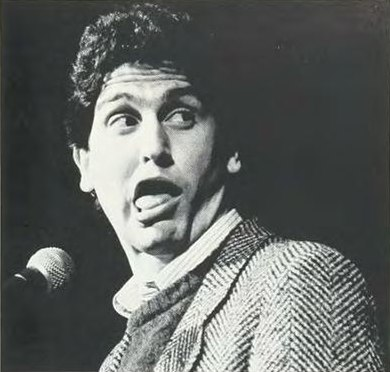
- Cotter performing circa 1988
- Education: University of Pennsylvania
- Occupation: Stand-up comedian
- Years active: 1987–present
- Website: waynecotter.com

Wayne Cotter is an American stand-up comedian.

Cotter attended the University of Pennsylvania where he studied computer engineering. After college, he became a comedian and made appearances on The Tonight Show, Late Show with David Letterman, and Politically Incorrect. From 1991 to 1994, he hosted Comic Strip Live, a stand-up comedy series on the Fox television network.

Cotter was one of the comedians featured in The Aristocrats. He also had a small part in the film Spy Hard. He now performs at corporate events and has appeared at hundreds of events for companies like Intel, IBM, BMW and Deloitte.
