= Rita Rudner =

American comedian (born 1953)

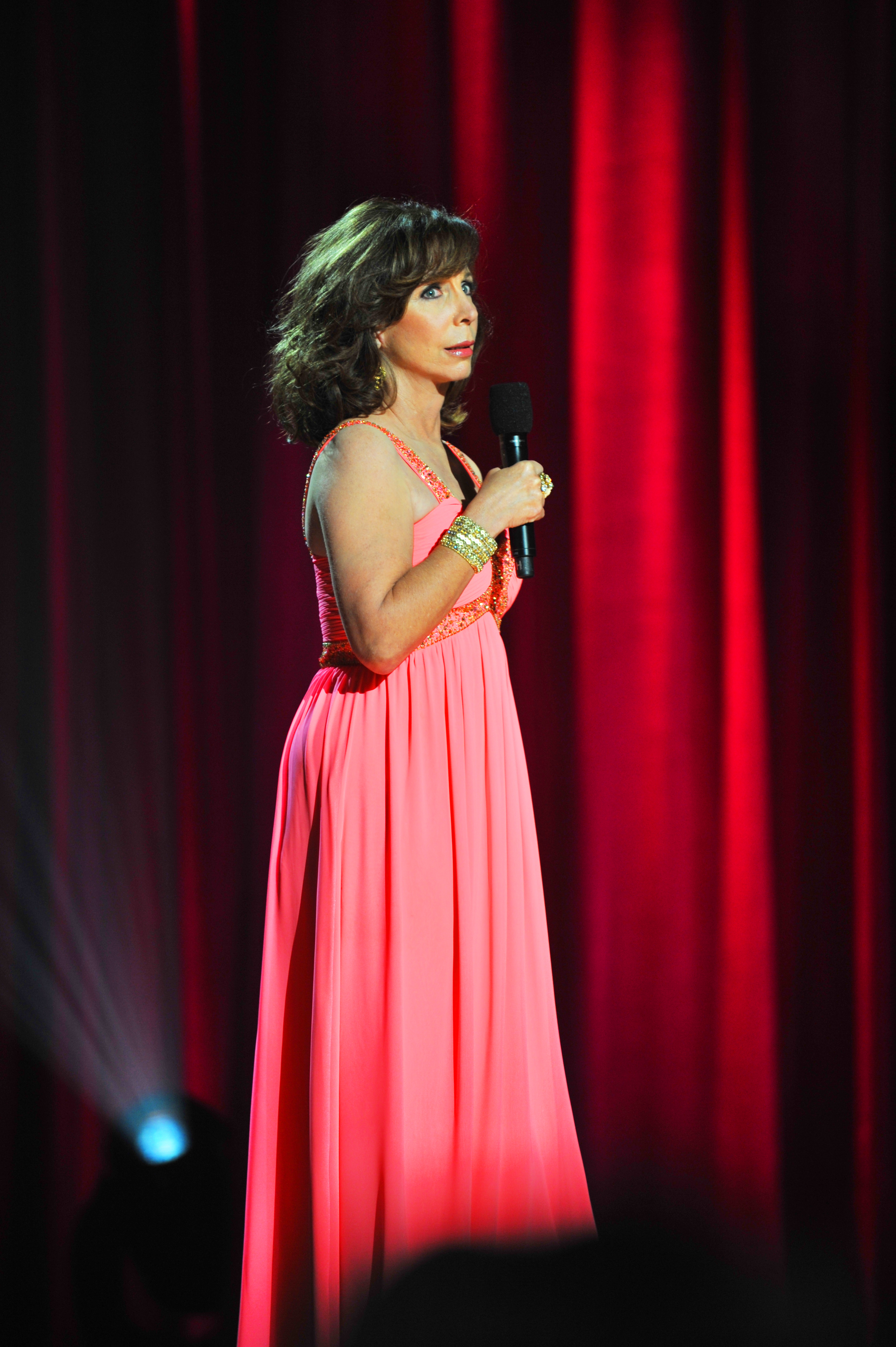
- Rudner in 2011
- Born: September 17, 1953 (age 73); Miami, Florida, U.S.
- Spouse: Martin Bergman (m. 1988)
- Children: 1

Comedy career
- Years active: 1968–present
- Medium: Comedy
- Website: ritarudner.com

Rita Rudner (born September 17, 1953) is an American stand-up comedian and actress. Beginning her career as a Broadway actress, Rudner noticed the lack of female comedians in New York City and turned to stand-up comedy, where she has performed for over three decades. Her performance on a variety of HBO specials and numerous appearances on The Tonight Show with Johnny Carson helped establish Rudner as one of the notable comics to emerge from the comedy boom of the 1980s.

== Early life ==
Rudner was born in Miami, Florida, the daughter of Frances an Orthodox Jewish homemaker from Brooklyn, and Abe Rudner, a lawyer from the Catskills. Rudner grew up in a Jewish family in Coconut Grove. She began taking ballet lessons at age four. Her mother died of breast cancer when she was 13 and her father remarried. She struggled to get along with her stepmother and felt a desire to become independent.

After graduating from high school at 15, Rudner left Miami and went to New York City to embark on a career as a dancer. Beginning with a small role in Promises, Promises (joining the production in 1970), she appeared in several Broadway shows, including the now-legendary original productions of Follies (1971) and Mack & Mabel (1974). She took over the role of Lily St. Regis in the long-running musical Annie circa 1980 and stayed with the company for over a year, leaving in 1981.

== Career ==
After starting her stand-up career in the late 1970s, Rudner made her network television debut on Late Night with David Letterman in 1982. She appeared frequently on television shows both in the US and the UK (recording a six-part series on BBC2 in 1990 in the latter), and often appeared on The Tonight Show Starring Johnny Carson as well as the HBO special Rodney Dangerfield's Young Comedians Special. She has recorded several award-winning comedy specials, most notably Rita Rudner: Born to Be Mild and Rita Rudner: Married Without Children for HBO and Rita Rudner: Live From Las Vegas for PBS in 2008.

Rudner and her husband wrote the screenplay of the 1992 film Peter's Friends, in which she also acted. She also has a role as the character "Bunny" in her husband's 2011 film Thanks, which had its world premiere at the 2011 Palm Springs Film Festival.

Rudner is the author of the books I Still Have It; I Just Can't Remember Where I Put It, Naked Beneath My Clothes and the novels Tickled Pink and Turning The Tables. She has written several screenplays and plays with her husband. In January 2016, she appeared in a new play titled Act 3... alongside Charles Shaughnessy at the Laguna Playhouse, directed by Martin Bergman.

Since 2001, Rudner has performed almost exclusively in Las Vegas, selling almost two million tickets and becoming the city's longest-running solo comedy show. She moved to a larger theater at The Venetian in January 2011. She also created and hosted the syndicated improvisational comedy show Ask Rita, which mimicked the format of a talk/advice show. For this she received a Gracie Allen Award from the Alliance for Women in Media Foundation (AWM). In May 2009 she performed for Senator Harry Reid and President Barack Obama at Caesars Palace alongside Bette Midler and Sheryl Crow.

== Personal life ==
Rudner is married to Martin Bergman, a British producer. They have an adopted daughter.

== Filmography ==
=== Film ===
Year	Title	Role	Notes
1988	The Wrong Guys	Pam	
1989	Gleaming the Cube	Mrs. Yabbo	
1989	That's Adequate	Frieda Philby	
1992	Peter's Friends	Carol Benson	also writer
1995	Goldilocks and the Three Bears	Ursula	
2009	Love Hurts	Lisa Levanthorp	
2011	Thanks	Bunny	

=== Television ===
Year	Title	Role	Notes
1994	Tales from the Crypt	Rolanda	"Whirlpool" episode
1995	Dr. Katz, Professional Therapist	Rita (voice)	"Real Estate" episode, also additional material writer
1996	A Weekend in the Country	Sally Shelton	TV movie, also writer
1997	Something So Right	Brooke	"Something About New Beds and Old Friends" episode
1998-99	The Nanny	Margot / Rita Rudner	"The Dummy Twins" and "Making Whoopi" episodes
2000	V.I.P.	Bidder at Art Auction	"Dangerous Beauty" episode
2000	Hollywood Off-Ramp		"Unfunny Girl" episode
2000	As Told by Ginger	Mrs. Fleming (voice)	"Of Lice and Friends" episode
2008	Victor Borge: 100 Years of Music & Laughter!	Narrator (voice)	TV movie
2011	RuPaul's Drag Race	Herself	"Ru Ha Ha" episode
2012	Melissa & Joey	Monica Burke	"Mother of All Problems" episode
2016	Dice	Rita Rudner	"Prestige" episode
2019	This Is Not Happening	Herself	1 episode, also writer
2022	Magnum P.I.	Patty	"Welcome to Paradise, Now Die" episode

=== Writer ===
Year	Title	Notes
1990	Rita Rudner	TV series (6 episodes)
2001	73rd Academy Awards	Special material
2002	74th Academy Awards	Special material
2003	Ask Rita	TV series (10 episodes)
2003	75th Academy Awards	Special material

=== Comedy specials ===
Year	Title	Studio	Formats
1987	Appears on On Location: Women of the Night	HBO	Broadcast/VHS
1989	One Night Stand	HBO	Broadcast/VHS/streaming
1990	Born to Be Mild	HBO	Broadcast/VHS
1995	Married Without Children	HBO	Broadcast/VHS
2008	Live from Las Vegas	PBS	Broadcast/DVD/download/streaming
2012	Rita Rudner and 3 Potential Ex-Husbands	Showtime/LOLflix	Broadcast/download/streaming
2018	A Tale of Two Dresses	Comedy Dynamics	Audio & video download/streaming
2020	Laugh Out Loud Flix	LOLflix	Streaming

== Bibliography ==
Year	Title	Publisher	Formats
1993	Naked Beneath My Clothes: Tales of a Revealing Nature	Penguin Books	Print: Hardcover/Paperback, Audiobook: Cassette/CD
1994	Rita Rudner's Guide To Men	Viking Adult	Hardcover/Paperback
2001	Tickled Pink: A Comic Novel	Atria Books	Print: Hardcover/Large Print/Paperback/E-book, Audiobook: CD/download/streaming
2006	Turning the Tables: A Novel	Crown	Hardcover
2009	I Still Have It... I Just Can't Remember Where I Put It: Confessions of a Fiftysomething	Crown	Hardcover/Large Print/Paperback/E-book
2022	My Life in Dog Years	Renaissance Literary & Talent	Hardcover
