= Jeff Cesario =

American comedian, actor and writer

- Born: March 30, 1953 (age 71)
- Occupation(s): Actor, Comedian, Producer, Writer

Jeff Cesario (born March 30, 1953) is an actor, comedian, producer and writer who has written and produced for Dennis Miller Live and The Larry Sanders Show. He has appeared on Adam Carolla, The Larry Sanders Show, The Tonight Show Starring Johnny Carson, The Howard Stern Show and Comedy Central Presents, among other shows. He was a writer on the 1998 film Jack Frost and has written for several television shows including awards shows like the Billboard Music Awards, Emmy Awards and Academy Awards.

Cesario was a part of two Emmy wins with Dennis Miller Live.
