= Ritch Shydner =

American actor

- Shydner in 1989
- Born: Ritchie A. Shidner; December 3, 1952 (age 73); Pennsville, New Jersey, U.S.
- Spouse: Carol Leifer (m. 1981; div. 1987)
- Children: 2

Comedy career
- Years active: 1977–present
- Medium: Stand-up, writing, television, film
- Genres: Improvisational comedy, observational comedy
- Website: www.ritchshydner.com

Ritchie A. "Ritch" Shydner (born December 3, 1952) is an American stand-up comedian, comedy writer and actor.

== Early life ==
Shydner was born in the small town of Pennsville Township, New Jersey, and attended Pennsville Memorial High School. He studied business and sociology at Gettysburg College, where he and sidekick, Camillo "Mad-Dog" Melchiorre, wrote, produced and starred in comedy skits for parents' weekends and fraternity events. Carmen "Honest-Abe" Volpecelli and Pluto "Fenderhead" Dombrosky also contributed to their "Used Car Salesman" skit. After graduation, Shydner was a substitute teacher in Pennsville, and managed a band. He began to work for a congressman, which sparked his interest in law school. As a student at George Mason University in Fairfax, Virginia, he decided to become a stand-up comedian. He began writing, and sent material to Mad magazine and National Lampoon, but found little success. Shortly thereafter, Shydner started performing stand-up comedy.

In the mid-1970s, Shydner went to open mic nights at local coffeehouses, and began opening for bands in Washington, D.C. and New York City. In 1982, he brought his act to Los Angeles. Slowly he started getting called in to audition for casting directors. Shydner studied acting for about four years and landed a regular role on Married... with Children.

== Career ==
As a stand-up comedian, Shydner appeared on The Tonight Show Starring Johnny Carson, Late Night with David Letterman and The Tonight Show with Jay Leno numerous times. He performed a HBO half-hour special called One Night Stand, as well as was a guest on Comics Unleashed. Shydner, along with comedian Mark Schiff, compiled stories of comedians on the road in a 2006 book entitled I Killed.

Shydner was featured in the 2010 documentary I Am Comic, in which he traveled around the country interviewing various comedians, a process that ultimately led to his return to stand-up by going on the stage again after 13 years of retirement.

As an actor, Shydner played Al Bundy's co-worker and friend Luke Ventura on Married... with Children and made guest appearances on other TV shows such as Designing Women, Roseanne and Dr. Katz, Professional Therapist. His film roles include Beverly Hills Cop II and Roxanne.

Shydner's influences are Art Carney, Lenny Bruce, Red Skelton and George Carlin.
