= Richard Jeni =

American comedian and actor (1957–2007)

- Born: Richard John Colangelo; April 14, 1957; Brooklyn, New York, U.S.
- Died: March 10, 2007 (aged 49); Los Angeles, California, U.S.
- Notable work: Charlie Schumaker in The Mask; Himself in Platypus Man

Comedy career
- Years active: 1982–2007
- Medium: Improv, stand-up comedy, film, television

Richard John Colangelo (April 14, 1957 – March 10, 2007), better known by his stage name Richard Jeni, was an American stand-up comedian and actor.

== Early life ==
Jeni was born and raised in an Italian-American Catholic family in Bensonhurst, Brooklyn. He graduated with honors from Hunter College, earning a bachelor's degree in comparative politics. After graduating, Jeni went on to do public relations work, but was let go from five different firms in two years before doing an open-mic night in Brooklyn and deciding to pursue standup comedy as a career in 1982.

== Career ==
Jeni first received recognition through a series of Showtime stand-up specials and frequent appearances on The Tonight Show. After making his Tonight Show debut in 1988 with Johnny Carson, Jeni returned often and later made appearances on The Tonight Show with Jay Leno, with more appearances than any other stand-up comedian. In 1989 he won Comedy USA's Best Nightclub Comedian, as voted by comedy club owners and comedians, and his first Showtime special Richard Jeni: The Boy From New York City won a CableACE Award.

Top executives at HBO picked up his first appearance on The HBO Comedy Hour in 1992, titled Richard Jeni: Platypus Man. The show was well received, and Jeni returned for two more shows, going on to receive another CableACE Award for one of his HBO specials. Jeni starred on the 1995 UPN sitcom Platypus Man and appeared in the Jim Carrey film The Mask. Jeni composed the theme song ("I'm A Platypus Man") for his TV series. He appeared in The Aristocrats, Dad's Week Off, An Alan Smithee Film: Burn Hollywood Burn, and Chasing Robert. He starred in commercial campaigns for Certs and Arby's, and he won a Clio Award for his work as a writer/performer in an advertising campaign for the American Dairy Association.

In 2004 Jeni was ranked #57 on Comedy Central's list of the 100 Greatest Stand-ups of All Time.

== Death ==
On March 10, 2007, Jeni committed suicide in his home in Los Angeles by shooting himself with a revolver. Jeni's girlfriend, Amy Hasten—a weather anchor and reporter for KTTV in Los Angeles—was cooking breakfast when she heard the gunshot. She found Jeni on the bathroom floor, a revolver at his feet, and a self-inflicted gunshot wound to the head.

Hasten called 9-1-1, and police and paramedics arrived and transported Jeni to Cedars-Sinai Medical Center, where he died at the age of 49. His family later stated with certainty that the death was a suicide and that Jeni had recently been diagnosed with "severe clinical depression coupled with fits of psychotic paranoia." According to the coroner's report released in June 2007, Jeni had a history of schizophrenia and had been taking antidepressants and a sleeping aid. The report further indicated that his girlfriend heard him talking to himself about a week earlier, saying "just squeeze the trigger."

Jeni's death was marked by many tributes, including thousands of messages on his website and YouTube as well as on the radio. On March 12, 2007, Jeni's death was mentioned on The Tonight Show by host Jay Leno, with accompanying footage of Jeni's last appearance on the show. On March 16, Bill Maher, who had performed with Jeni as a young comic, dedicated the fifth episode of the fifth season of his HBO show, Real Time with Bill Maher, to Jeni and discussed his death on Larry King Live.

== Filmography ==
- Bird (1988) as Morello
- The Mask (1994) as Charlie Schumaker
- Dad's Week Off (1997) as Bernie
- An Alan Smithee Film: Burn Hollywood Burn (1998) as Jerry Glover
- Chasing Robert (2007) as Rich the Bookie

=== Television series ===
- Dr. Katz, Professional Therapist (1995–2002) as Himself
- Platypus Man (1995) as himself
- Shorties Watchin' Shorties (2004) as himself
- Everybody Hates Chris (2005) as Cop - Season 2, ep. 1

=== HBO specials ===
- Richard Jeni: Platypus Man (1993)
- Richard Jeni: A Good Catholic Boy (1997)
- Richard Jeni: A Big Steaming Pile of Me (2005)

=== Showtime specials ===
- Richard Jeni: Boy from New York City (1989)
- Richard Jeni: Crazy from The Heat (1991)

=== Other works ===
- OfficeMax commercial (voice) (1995–1999)
- Certs commercial
- Coca-Cola commercial for concession stands at the movie theater (1997)
