= List of The Tonight Show Starring Johnny Carson episodes (1986) =

Episodes in 1986

- No. of episodes: 191

Release
- Original network: NBC

Season chronology
- ← Previous; 1985 episodes Next → 1987 episodes

The following is a list of episodes of the television series The Tonight Show Starring Johnny Carson which aired in 1986.

== 1986 ==
=== January ===
No.	Original release date	Guest(s)	Musical/entertainment guest(s)
5,463	January 2, 1986	Angie Dickinson, Gene Rader	N/A
Items That Were Popular Last Year
5,464	January 3, 1986	Tim Conway, Hal Linden, Don Stanley	N/A
Lighten Up - Response to Nevada Gov. Richard Bryan's demand for an apology for interstate rivalry jokes Johnny told.
5,465	January 7, 1986	George Segal, Wil Shriner, Kareem Abdul-Jabbar	N/A
Where to Look for Halley's Comet; Predictions for 1986
5,466	January 8, 1986	Madeline Kahn, A. Whitney Brown	N/A
Talk with Ed- Halley's Comet, Astronomer; Morality Test- Ethics Morality Survey That Appear in U.S. News & World Report; Johnny gives the audience a survey and their responses are measured by a meter.
5,467	January 9, 1986	George Miller, Rosanna Arquette	Liberace
Poll taken on what american consider to be the top ten heroes in this country.
5,468	January 10, 1986	Brian Dennehy	George Carl, Martina Arroyo ("Mädchenfluch")
Carnac the Magnificent
5,469	January 14, 1986	James Garner, Barry Diamond	Anita Morris
List of Corrections That Need to be Made in Other Books
5,470	January 15, 1986	Don Rickles, Waddie Mitchell	Pete Fountain
List of Interesting Facts
5,471	January 16, 1986	Michael Douglas, Joanna Kerns	New York Sax Quartet
In honor of Halley's Comet, Johnny demonstrates how the Solar System works, uses 10 studio audience volunteers to demonstrate.
5,472	January 17, 1986	Dabney Coleman, Carl Sagan	N/A
A Bootleg Tape of The Tonight Show
5,473	January 21, 1986	Shelley Winters, Brad Garrett	Stanley Jordan
Subject Calendars
5,474	January 22, 1986	Joe Namath, Teri Garr, Roy Blount, Jr.	N/A
Video Report by Steve Young about Scott's Jumbo Roll Toilet Paper
5,475	January 23, 1986	Jeff Daniels, Vijay Amritraj, Rufus Hussey	N/A
Public Service Announcement for NBC
5,476	January 24, 1986	Harvey Korman, Michael Ammar	David Tolley (pianist)
Tonight Show Sports Exclusive- Super Bowl Announcers who are covering the game
5,477	January 27, 1986	Joan Rivers (guest host), Emmanuel Lewis, Oprah Winfrey, Mayor Ed Koch, Betty White	N/A
5,478	January 28, 1986	Joan Rivers (guest host), Tony Danza, Linda Lavin, Louie Anderson, Dr. Ruth Westheimer	N/A
The monologue was cancelled due to the Space Shuttle Challenger disaster.
5,479	January 29, 1986	Joan Rivers (guest host), David Steinberg, James Farentino, Mark Harmon, Estelle Getty	N/A
5,480	January 30, 1986	Joan Rivers (guest host), Joan Collins, William Devane, William Perry	N/A
5,481	January 31, 1986	Joan Rivers (guest host), Ursula Andress, Kate Capshaw, Roger Ebert, Gene Siskel	Teddy Pendergrass

=== February ===
No.	Original release date	Guest(s)	Musical/entertainment guest(s)
5,482	February 4, 1986	Buddy Hackett, Jim McMahon	Louie Bellson
Johnny surveys the audience to indicate their Academy Awards preferences.
5,483	February 5, 1986	Louie Anderson, Steven Callahan	Miami Sound Machine
Leslie Pick, a teacher at Westlake Village School sent Johnny a project her students participated in.. they were given the first half of some old-fashioned cliches and had to complete them. Johnny reads what they came up with.
5,484	February 6, 1986	Danny Cooksey, Robin Williams	Mummenschanz
President's Birthday Cards
5,485	February 7, 1986	Alan Thicke, Spud Webb, Jamie Rose	N/A
5,486	February 11, 1986	America Morris, Don Ameche	N/A
Johnny jokes that if Coca-Cola purchased Merv Griffin Productions, then a new soft drink would be called, 'Merv'.
5,487	February 12, 1986	Billy Martin, Maureen Murphy, Akosua Busia	N/A
Sports Illustrated Girls Edition
5,488	February 13, 1986	Alexandra Paul, Terri Jones	Julia Migenes-Johnson
Johnny talks about Lee Iacocca getting fired from the Statue of Liberty committee. Johnny takes a sip of his coffee, it is cold he goes down the hall to get a new cup, sees the vending machines, among them is one for 'Live Animals, 50 Cents', Johnny puts his money and out comes a dog, Max.
5,489	February 14, 1986	James Stewart, Fritz Coleman	N/A
Johnny wishes everyone a happy Valentine's Day. Four girls from Pepperdine come out and surprise Johnny with presents. Girls discussed their sorority living situations.
5,490	February 18, 1986	Betty White, Jon Cryer	Pia Zadora
Examples from the Dictionary of American Regional English
5,491	February 19, 1986	Roseanne Barr, Stephen Baccus	N/A
Johnny decides he would like to help out Baby Doc and try to locate an apartment for him. He looks through the recycler and, on the air, answers some of the ads for a room.
5,492	February 20, 1986	Jim Fowler, Ronn Lucas, Brenda Venus	Andrae Crouch
5,493	February 21, 1986	Oprah Winfrey, Jerry Seinfeld, Shirley Muldowney	N/A
Johnny and Ed plays a game of Trivial Pursuit.
5,494	February 25, 1986	Bud Greenspan	Jim Stafford, Russell Reig
Prince Charles' Ears; Search For a Person with the Biggest Ears
5,495	February 26, 1986	Tab Thacker, Jack Gallagher, Victoria Jackson	N/A
Tommy Newsom's Birthday
5,496	February 27, 1986	Garry Shandling, Joseph Westley Newman	N/A
Johnny invites three members of the studio audience to come up and do a segment of the monologue.
5,497	February 28, 1986	Father Guido Sarducci, Gene Siskel, Roger Ebert, Robin Barnett	N/A
Edge of Wetness

=== March ===
No.	Original release date	Guest(s)	Musical/entertainment guest(s)
5,498	March 3, 1986	Joan Rivers (guest host), Carrie Fisher, Ronnie Shakes, Hal Holbrook	John Denver ("Dreamland Express", "Aspen on a Saturday Night")
Celebrity Car Jokes
5,499	March 4, 1986	Joan Rivers (guest host), Barbara Walters, Susan Sullivan	Little Richard
5,500	March 5, 1986	Joan Rivers (guest host), Lynn Redgrave, C. Thomas Howell, Dr. Joyce Brothers	N/A
Joan's dog, Spike shows that he does some fancy tricks.
5,501	March 6, 1986	Joan Rivers (guest host), Valerie Harper, Arsenio Hall, Ron Howard	Peter Allen
5,502	March 7, 1986	Joan Rivers (guest host), Katherine Helmond, Gene Siskel, Roger Ebert	Nell Carter ("Be Mine Tonight" and "Stormy Monday Blues")
5,503	March 11, 1986	Keith Carradine, Wendy Schaal	N/A
Frequent Flyers Program; Three People in Audience try an absence of humor test, like the baseball players, and drug testing.
5,504	March 12, 1986	Barry O'Halloran, Steve Landesberg, David Horowitz	N/A
Public Service Announcement
5,505	March 13, 1986	Jane Curtin, Jason Bateman	Jay Johnson
Collecting the Audience Members' Shoes
5,506	March 14, 1986	David Steinberg, Woody Harrelson	The King's Singers ("I'm a Train", "Flight of the Bumble Bee", "Born On a New Day")
5,507	March 18, 1986	Barbara Hershey	Ray Charles
Recognition of Some People Behind the Scenes that Deserve Life Time Achievement Awards
5,508	March 19, 1986	Jon Voight	Alabama ("She And I", "Forty Hour Week")
Zoos begin advertising their manure, better known as 'Zoo Doo'. Johnny decides that he is going to call two different zoo directors and try to find the best deal on 'Animal Stuff'.
5,509	March 20, 1986	Shelley Long, Margaret Avery	Raspini Bros.
Blue Cards
5,510	March 21, 1986	Michael Keaton, Teresa Ganzel	Dionne Warwick
Johnny reads a letter from Mark Harris of Kansas. Both times that Mark's wife was pregnant, she had gone into labor during Johnny's monologue. Mark is wondering what kind of power Johnny had been granted.
5,511	March 25, 1986	Richard Benjamin	Willie Nelson
Trivial Contest
5,512	March 26, 1986	Doug Henning, Jackie Mason	N/A
Sketch- "Max Beta's Collection of Marcos Family's Golden Treasure of Fine Music"; Foreign Commercials
5,513	March 27, 1986	Billy Crystal, Lucille Thompson	Buddy Rich
110th anniversary of the invention of the telephone. Johnny got a transcript of the entire conversation between them and recreates it for the audience.
5,514	March 28, 1986	Dom Irrera, Bess Armstrong	Corey Cerovsek
Child Labor Laws

=== April ===
No.	Original release date	Guest(s)	Musical/entertainment guest(s)
5,515	April 1, 1986	Teri Garr, Richard Chamberlain	Brunson Brothers
The Legend of April Fool's Day
5,516	April 2, 1986	Don King	John Williams, guitar ("Albéniz Asturias", "Galilei Saltarello")
5,517	April 3, 1986	Frank Zappa, Dorothy Davis	N/A
Tonight Show Dating Computer
5,518	April 4, 1986	Charles Grodin, Yakov Smirnoff	Katrina & The Waves ("Walking on Sunshine")
Carnac the Magnificent
5,519	April 15, 1986	Judge Reinhold, Don Richardson, Jane Snyder	Exile
Blue Cards; Silly Spellers
5,520	April 16, 1986	Larry Miller, Mark Lindsay Chapman	Frankie Yankovic ("Just Because" & "Cleveland, The Polka Town")
Tonight show received a phone call from the representative of the local French Tourism office. Johnny invited the representative to come on the show and present his side of the argument. (Remake of a 1967 sketch originally done with Robert Mandan.)
5,521	April 17, 1986	Sammy Davis, Jr., Bill Maher	N/A
An Experiment on Gossip
5,522	April 18, 1986	David Letterman, Adela Rivera	Maureen McGovern ("I Got Rhythm")
Lighten Up Michael Mendolsohn
5,523	April 22, 1986	Tom Hulce, The Amazing Randi	Brian Slawson
Public Service Announcements
5,524	April 23, 1986	Patrick Duffy, Harry Anderson, Lucy Lee Flippin	N/A
Letters from Children Stating 'Why or Why Not They Would Like to Marry When They Grow Up'
5,525	April 24, 1986	Ted Turner, Kevin Rooney	Dizzy Gillespie
Johnny has a couple of low cost travel excursions that tourists can participate in, the most exciting offer being a tour of the Playboy Mansion.
5,526	April 25, 1986	Joan Embery, Joan Rivers, Philip Michael Thomas	N/A
5,527	April 28, 1986	Joan Rivers (guest host), Anthony Quinn	Patti LaBelle, Michael McDonald
5,528	April 29, 1986	Joan Rivers (guest host), Hulk Hogan, Mr. Rogers, Calvin Trillin	N/A
5,529	April 30, 1986	Joan Rivers (guest host), Danny DeVito, Bobcat Goldthwait	Pointer Sisters ("Jump" and "Hey You")

=== May ===
No.	Original release date	Guest(s)	Musical/entertainment guest(s)
5,530	May 1, 1986	Joan Rivers (guest host), Tony Danza, Elizabeth Ashley, Richard Simmons	Pia Zadora
5,531	May 2, 1986	Joan Rivers (guest host), Mark Harmon, Rick Overton, Vanna White, Roger Vadim	N/A
Joan Rivers guest hosts The Tonight Show for the last time. She first guest hosted in 1969, when Johnny Carson was on vacation.
5,532	May 6, 1986	Harvey Korman	Donna Theodore, Nicolas Slonimsky
A bit on Chief on Protocol on a few comedic customs- 'Never ask a late night talk show host, how's your wife?'
5,533	May 7, 1986	Ed Kennedy, Buddy Hackett, Ally Sheedy	N/A
Johnny tries to find work for four Playboy Bunnies as The Playboy Club in L.A. would close the next month.
5,534	May 8, 1986	Joe Piscopo	Yo-Yo Ma (Elfentanz by David Popper)
Interviewing Techniques
5,535	May 9, 1986	Bob Uecker, Kathleen Wilhoite, Zippy the Chimp	N/A
Desk - Johnny does a bit on Mother's Day sales.
5,536	May 13, 1986	Marvelous Marvin Hagler	Jennifer Holliday ("We Can Work It Out" and "Dreams Never Die")
Hummingbirds
5,537	May 14, 1986	Patrick Swayze, Linda Ellerbee	Oak Ridge Boys
Johnny found an army sea rations survival kit while cleaning his office.
5,538	May 15, 1986	Anthony Quinn, JoBeth Williams	Joe Bushkin
5,539	May 16, 1986	Paula Poundstone	Leonard Waxdeck & The Birdcallers, ZZ Top ("Sharp Dressed Man", "Tush")
Tonight Show Promos for Sweeps Week
5,540	May 20, 1986	Lucy Lee Flippin	Dwight Yoakam ("Honky Tonk Man", "Guitars, Cadillacs")
Update on Hummingbirds
5,541	May 21, 1986	Richard Pryor, Dudley Moore, Gwen Norton	N/A
5,542	May 22, 1986	Bette Davis	Pete Fountain
Travel Advisories for Tourists; Spoof of the 'World Status Map'
5,543	May 23, 1986	Bob Hope, Christine Lahti	Diane Schuur
Hummingbirds; Pilots That Didn't Make It
5,544	May 27, 1986	Joanna Kerns, The Amazing Randi	George Carl
Stump the Band
5,545	May 28, 1986	Rosie Gries, Steven Wright	N/A
Questions from the Audience
5,546	May 29, 1986	Tom Selleck, Pam Matteson	Robert Palmer ("Addicted to Love", "Hyperactive")
Audience Survey
5,547	May 30, 1986	Jackie Mason, Teresa Ganzel	Dolly Parton ("My Tennessee Mountain Home")

=== June ===
No.	Original release date	Guest(s)	Musical/entertainment guest(s)
5,548	June 2, 1986	Garry Shandling (guest host), Jon Voight, Rich Hall, Justine Bateman	Marvin Hamlisch
5,549	June 3, 1986	Garry Shandling (guest host), Betty White, Alan Thicke, Kevin Nealon	N/A
5,550	June 4, 1986	Garry Shandling (guest host), Joan Van Ark, Robert Hays, Victoria Jackson	The Nylons
5,551	June 5, 1986	Garry Shandling (guest host), Howie Mandel, Jeff Goldblum	Eddie Rabbitt ("I Love a Rainy Night" and "Repetitive Regret")
5,552	June 6, 1986	Garry Shandling (guest host), Ed Begley, Jr., Teresa Ganzel, Sugar Ray Leonard	N/A
5,553	June 10, 1986	Jon Pennington (1986 Scripps National Spelling Bee champion), George Carlin	N/A
New Products
5,554	June 11, 1986	Billy Crystal, Arnold Schwarzenegger, Michael Ammar	N/A
Mighty Carson Art Players- Takeoff of Televised Senate Hearings on C-Span (Johnny portrays a Southern senator who approached the podium and addresses the crowd)
5,555	June 12, 1986	Cybill Shepherd, Virgie White	Andrae Crouch
Stump the Band
5,556	June 13, 1986	Bill Cosby	Graham Nash
Superstitions; Phobias
5,557	June 17, 1986	Carl Reiner, Roy Blount, Jr.	N/A
Blue Cards
5,558	June 18, 1986	Burt Reynolds, Franklyn Ajaye	N/A
Foreign Commercials
5,559	June 19, 1986	Kate Capshaw, Roseanne Barr, Woody Harrelson	N/A
Johnny suggests Doc Severinsen as Don Johnson's replacement, and engages him in a scene written for 'Miami Vice' with Doc as Sonny Crockett and Johnny as Rico.
5,560	June 20, 1986	David Steinberg, Craig T. Nelson	Kim Carnes ("Black & White", "I'd Lie to You for Your Love")
Letters Written by School Pupils; Statue of Liberty Memorabilia
5,561	June 24, 1986	Anthony Perkins, Paul Provenza, Joe Garagiola	N/A
Supreme Court Justice Appointments
5,562	June 25, 1986	Steve Landesberg	Joe Jackson ("Home Town", "Tango Atlantico")
Psychic Predictions
5,563	June 26, 1986	John Searing, Danny DeVito, Joan Embery	N/A
5,564	June 27, 1986	David Letterman, Judge Joseph Wapner	Julio Iglesias

=== July ===
No.	Original release date	Guest(s)	Musical/entertainment guest(s)
5,565	July 14, 1986	Garry Shandling (guest host), Bronson Pinchot, George Wendt	Rosanne Cash
5,566	July 15, 1986	Garry Shandling (guest host), Judge Reinhold, Lyle Alzado, Sydney Goldsmith, Jimmy Aleck	N/A
5,567	July 16, 1986	Garry Shandling (guest host), Judith Light, Sally Kellerman, Mary Gross, Richard Lewis	N/A
Blue Cards
5,568	July 17, 1986	Garry Shandling (guest host), Marsha Mason, Anthony Perkins	N/A
5,569	July 18, 1986	Garry Shandling (guest host), Marilu Henner, John Larroquette, James Belushi	Anita Morris
5,570	July 22, 1986	Walter Matthau, Dick Rutan, Jeana Yeager, Katrina Leskanich	N/A
Johnny interviews prop man Jack Grant to find out who could have lifted the missing cigarette box and lighter from the Tonight Show prop box. After the break, Johnny talks about visiting his childhood home in Avoca, Iowa for the first time in over 50 years.
5,571	July 23, 1986	Garry Shandling, The Raspyni Brothers	Horacio Gutiérrez (Étude in D# minor by Scriabin, Étude in F major by Moszkowski)
Blue Cards
5,572	July 24, 1986	Jay Leno	Sandi Patty ("Pour on the Power" and "Love In Any Language")
Stump the Band
5,573	July 25, 1986	Teri Garr, Michael Bohdan	Leon Redbone ("Knocking Down Windows", "Steal Away Blues")
Carnac the Magnificent
5,574	July 29, 1986	The Amazing Randi, Paul Miller	The Labèque Sisters (Medley from West Side Story)
Stolen Tonight Show Props
5,575	July 30, 1986	Joan Embery, James Belushi	Judy Rodman
Anti-Fat Pill
5,576	July 31, 1986	Linda Ellerbee, Chong Qing Acrobats	Amy Grant ("Fat Baby", "Stay for Awhile")
Summer Drinks

=== August ===
No.	Original release date	Guest(s)	Musical/entertainment guest(s)
5,577	August 1, 1986	Charles Grodin, Dom Irrera, Tommy Walton	N/A
NBC Gift Shop
5,578	August 5, 1986	Father Guido Sarducci	Belinda Carlisle ("Mad About You" and "I Feel The Magic")
Humorous Public Service Announcements
5,579	August 6, 1986	Robert Klein, Devin DeVasquez	Placido Domingo (“Serenata Tapatia”, "Noche Plateada”, "Júrame")
Discusses West Coast's plan to build their own version of the Statue of Liberty.
5,580	August 7, 1986	Alan Thicke	Miami Sound Machine
Carson's Believe It or Stuff It
5,581	August 8, 1986	Tom Hanks, Ronnie Shakes	Diane Schuur
Earthquake Kits
5,582	August 26, 1986	Kaleena Kiff, Paul Hogan	Fabulous Thunderbirds ("Tuff Enuff", "Wrap It Up")
Johnny's Vacation Time; Tax Reform Bill- Little Known Tax Code- Death & Taxes
5,583	August 27, 1986	Blake Clark, Gene Siskel, Roger Ebert	Crystal Gayle
5,584	August 28, 1986	George Carlin, Helen Slater	The Temptations
Exploitation News
5,585	August 29, 1986	Paul Reiser, Helen Slater, Victoria Jackson	Pete Fountain

=== September ===
No.	Original release date	Guest(s)	Musical/entertainment guest(s)
5,586	September 2, 1986	Dr. Joe Daugherty	Tony Bennett
Postcards That Had Been Sent to The Tonight Show from Friends from the Past
5,587	September 3, 1986	Teresa Ganzel, Lewis Grizzard	George Benson ("In Your Eyes", "Turn Your Love Around")
Mighty Carson Art Players- "Tea Time Movie"
5,588	September 4, 1986	Vanna White, Bobby Kelton	Luciano Pavarotti ("Una furtiva lagrima", "Recondita armonia")
Follow up to The Purple Cow Poem; States Putting Down Each Other
5,589	September 5, 1986	Merv Griffin, Paula Poundstone, David Horowitz	N/A
U.S. Open, Public Address System Announcements
5,590	September 8, 1986	Betty White (guest host), Jack Klugman, William Devane, Paul Rodriguez, Charles Nelson Reilly	N/A
5,591	September 9, 1986	Jay Leno (guest host), Michele Lee, Deidre Hall	B.B. King
Jay Leno guest hosts The Tonight Show for the very first time.
5,592	September 10, 1986	Jay Leno (guest host), Pam Dawber, Paul Sorvino	Robert Palmer ("Riptide")
Blue Cards.
5,593	September 11, 1986	Billy Crystal (guest host), Howard Cosell, Richard Lewis	Larry Gatlin
5,594	September 12, 1986	Billy Crystal (guest host), Teri Garr, Don King, Paul Shaffer	Chaka Khan ("Love Is A Lifetime")
5,595	September 16, 1986	Steve Landesberg, Jason Bateman	Spiegle Willcox, Wild Bill Davison
5,596	September 17, 1986	Bob Newhart, Saundra Santiago, Teresa Ganzel	N/A
Mighty Carson Art Players- "Tea Time Movie"
5,597	September 18, 1986	George Segal, Loni Anderson, Bill Paxton	N/A
Suggestions for Ending Phrase for Tonight Show
5,598	September 19, 1986	David Letterman, Geena Davis	Andreas Vollenweider
Composite Photos
5,599	September 22, 1986	Kenny Rogers (guest host), Tony Danza, Dudley Moore	N/A
For a monologue, Kenny sings "They Don't Make Them Like They Used To"; Kenny shows some of his shots of the Lincoln Memorial, caverns, etc.
5,600	September 23, 1986	Bill Cosby (guest host), Bea Arthur, Linda Ellerbee	Liberace
5,601	September 24, 1986	Bill Cosby (guest host), Andy Griffith, Brad Garrett	Pointer Sisters ("Neutron Dance")
5,602	September 26, 1986	Bill Cosby (guest host), Tyne Daly, Ted Danson, Sherman Hemsley	José Feliciano
5,603	September 30, 1986	John Larroquette, Joe Garagiola	Steve Earle ("Guitar Town")
The resolution of the Dallas cliffhangers and a number of possible cliffhangers for other shows returning to television.

=== October ===
No.	Original release date	Guest(s)	Musical/entertainment guest(s)
5,604	October 1, 1986	David Steinberg (guest host), John Davidson, Joanna Kerns, Tom Poston, Ed Begley, Jr.	N/A
David discuss his career as a director.
5,605	October 2, 1986	Gene Siskel, Roger Ebert, Pete Barbutti	Ben E. King ("Stand by Me" and "Spanish Harlem")
Stockmarket- E.F. Mutton
5,606	October 3, 1986	Jay Leno (guest host), Joan Van Ark, Susan Cash	Corey Cerovsek
Blue Cards, 'How Has The Tonight Show Affected Your Life as Both A Human Being and An American?'
5,607	October 7, 1986	Buddy Hackett, Justine Bateman	N/A
Public Service Announcement- Plea for Donations to the Nancy Reagan Icelandic Wardrobe Foundation.
5,608	October 8, 1986	Patrick Duffy, Bob Uecker	Michael McDonald ("Sweet Freedom")
Johnny returns with a picture that was taken by a photographer, who is on the scene while Dan Rather was getting his beating. (Peter Jennings and Tom Brokaw are in picture)
5,609	October 9, 1986	Richard Pryor, Sean Penn	Kenny G ("Songbird")
Johnny's Eulogy for Baby the Rooster
5,610	October 10, 1986	Tim Conway, Barry Diamond, Jerry Slocum	N/A
Johnny interviews "Daryl Dorf" (Tim Conway)
5,611	October 14, 1986	Smothers Brothers, Elisabeth Shue, Marguerite Hanusa	N/A
Tommy is congratulated on his rave reviews for his gig at the Vine Street Bar with Rosemary Clooney.
5,612	October 15, 1986	James Stewart, Paul Reiser	N/A
Blue Cards
5,613	October 16, 1986	Woody Harrelson, Ritch Shydner	Cyndi Lauper ("Change of Heart" and "True Colors")
Johnny and Ed talks about their 28th Anniversary (how long they've worked together) is coming.
5,614	October 17, 1986	Fritz Coleman, Larry Anderson	Linda Ronstadt ("Am I Blue?", "When You Wish Upon a Star" and "My Funny Valentine")
Johnny apologizes for Burt not appearing on the show tonight as promised, but brings out Fred Leaf, Burt's lookalike.
5,615	October 21, 1986	Tom Dreesen	Liza Minnelli ("My Ship" and "The Man I Love"), Christopher Parkening
5,616	October 22, 1986	Sigourney Weaver	Rosemary Clooney ("When October Goes")
The 99th Congress and the many laws that have passed.; Humorous No-Go's
5,617	October 23, 1986	Lily Tomlin, Ray Combs	N/A
Comedy Crypt- In memory of Tip O'Neil jokes forever
5,618	October 24, 1986	Michael Landon, Thalassa Cruso	Carl Anderson
The 65th Birthday of Tonight Show electrician Danny who is retiring.
5,619	October 27, 1986	Garry Shandling (guest host), Martin Mull, Vanna White	Billy Vera & The Beaters ("At This Moment")
Garry brings out miniature bowling game and plays on desk with Doc.
5,620	October 28, 1986	Garry Shandling (guest host), Father Guido Sarducci, Victoria Jackson, Jason Bateman	Luther Vandross
5,621	October 29, 1986	Garry Shandling (guest host), Tyne Daly, Susan Sullivan, Bill Maher	N/A
Blue Cards
5,622	October 30, 1986	Bill Cosby (guest host), Bob Melvin	Carmen McRae, Dirty Dozen Brass Band
5,623	October 31, 1986	Chevy Chase (guest host), Jay Leno, Markie Post	Paul Simon ("Graceland")
Blue Cards

=== November ===
No.	Original release date	Guest(s)	Musical/entertainment guest(s)
5,624	November 5, 1986	Burt Reynolds, Dick Shawn	N/A
Desk - Johnny does a bit on unaired Tonight Show episodes preempted by the 1986 World Series.
5,625	November 6, 1986	Joan Collins, Steven Wright	N/A
As The White House Turns
5,626	November 7, 1986	Alan Thicke, Rosanna Arquette, Oprah Winfrey	N/A
Johnny talks about how he cut his ear.
5,627	November 11, 1986	Jeff Daniels, Georgette Prothero	Anita Baker ("Sweet Love")
Public Service Announcements
5,628	November 12, 1986	Saundra Santiago, Roy Blount, Jr.	Janie Fricke
Suggestions on How to Raise Extra Money for NBC
5,629	November 13, 1986	The Amazing Randi, Mat Plendl	Andy Williams
Blue Cards
5,630	November 14, 1986	Dabney Coleman, Rich Hall	N/A
Johnny talks about Bruce Springteen's new album, a five record set and the media hoopla over this album; Now there is a NEWSOM, a five record set.
5,631	November 18, 1986	Jack Paar, Stephen Lang	N/A
Johnny talks about the Family Privacy Act.
5,632	November 19, 1986	Paul Reiser, Tom Gaskin	Bobby McFerrin
Floyd R. Turbo
5,633	November 20, 1986	Tim Conway, Maureen Stapleton	Donna Theodore
Tim Conway performs a cooking skit entitled, "Cooking with Judy Child".
5,634	November 21, 1986	David Steinberg, Paul Shaffer	N/A
Old Newspaper Announcements; November Sweeps
5,635	November 25, 1986	Jim Fowler, Victoria Jackson	Oak Ridge Boys
5,636	November 26, 1986	George Carlin, Barney Odom and his tree-climbing dog Flat Nose	N/A
Letters Written by 2nd and 5th Grade Students Regarding Being a Turkey
5,637	November 27, 1986	David Letterman	Robert Palmer ("I Didn't Mean to Turn You On" and "Nature Boy")
Blue Cards
5,638	November 28, 1986	Joe Piscopo, Ellen DeGeneres, Dennis Hart	N/A
Talks with Studio Audience

=== December ===
No.	Original release date	Guest(s)	Musical/entertainment guest(s)
5,639	December 1, 1986	Tony Danza (guest host), Alyssa Milano, Danny Pintauro, Marilu Henner	N/A
5,640	December 2, 1986	Garry Shandling (guest host), Richard Lewis, Kate Capshaw	Little Richard
5,641	December 3, 1986	Garry Shandling (guest host), Joan Embery, Tom Poston	N/A
5,642	December 4, 1986	Jay Leno (guest host), Amy Irving, Eva Marie Saint, Michael Palin	Stanley Jordan
5,643	December 5, 1986	Jay Leno (guest host), Angie Dickinson, Stepfanie Kramer	Billy Vera & The Beaters
Blue Cards
5,644	December 9, 1986	Don Rickles	Singing Dog Contest
5,645	December 10, 1986	Ritch Shydner, David Horowitz	Dolly Parton
5,646	December 11, 1986	Eddie Townsend, James Garner	Bobby McFerrin
Mighty Carson Art Players- "President Reagan reads 'Twas The Night Before X-Mas'"
5,647	December 12, 1986	Chevy Chase, Gene Siskel, Roger Ebert	Al Jarreau
Letters Written to Santa
5,648	December 16, 1986	Steve Martin, Joseph Gabriel	Sandi Patty
Blue Cards
5,649	December 17, 1986	Jim McMahon, Mark McCollum	N/A
5,650	December 18, 1986	Jane Fonda	Amy Grant
New Products
5,651	December 19, 1986	Bob Hope, Tom Noddy	Barbara Mandrell ("Santa, Bring My Baby Home")
Talk With the Audience
5,652	December 30, 1986	Tim Conway, Teresa Ganzel	Diane Schuur
Men Available for New Years Eve
5,653	December 31, 1986	Bill Kirchenbauer	Billy Vera & The Beaters
Rules of The Rose Parade
