= List of The Tonight Show Starring Johnny Carson episodes (1987) =

- No. of episodes: 179

Release
- Original network: NBC

Season chronology
- ← Previous; 1986 episodes Next → 1988 episodes

The following is a list of episodes of the television series The Tonight Show Starring Johnny Carson which aired in 1987. In October, 1962 Johnny Carson took over as host of the show from the previous host Jack Paar.

== 1987 ==
=== January ===
No.	Original release date	Guest(s)	Musical/entertainment guest(s)
5,654	January 6, 1987	Jay Leno, Scot Morris (Omni puzzles editor)	Pete Fountain
Psychic Predictions
5,655	January 7, 1987	Alan King, Warren Chang	Jay Johnson
Sports Injuries
5,656	January 8, 1987	Baxter Black, Waddie Mitchell	Robert Goulet ("Memory")
Calendars
5,657	January 9, 1987	Joan Embery, Teresa Ganzel, Wil Shriner	Paula Kelly
Mighty Carson Art Players- "Tea Time Movie"; Expensive Props
5,658	January 13, 1987	Jay Leno (guest host), John Larroquette, Dana Carvey	N/A
Blue Cards
5,659	January 14, 1987	Garry Shandling (guest host), James Woods, Ellen DeGeneres	Ellen Greene
5,660	January 15, 1987	Garry Shandling (guest host), Ed Begley, Jr., Taylor Negron	N/A
5,661	January 16, 1987	Garry Shandling (guest host), Jeff Goldblum, Geena Davis, Kelly Monteith	Jimmy Buffett ("Take It Back" and "If It All Falls Down")
5,662	January 20, 1987	Jerry Seinfeld, Mike Ditka	Pointer Sisters ("All I Know Is The Way I Feel")
5,663	January 21, 1987	Barbara Schein, Robert Klein	N/A
Mighty Carson Art Players- "Carl Sagan"
5,664	January 22, 1987	Richard Pryor, Dr. Robert Ballard	The Judds ("Turn It Loose")
5,665	January 23, 1987	Lauren Bacall, Roseanne Barr	Robert Cray
Takeoff of 'Bob Hope's Look All American Football'
5,666	January 26, 1987	Patrick Duffy (guest host), Steve Allen, William Shatner	Louise Mandrell
Blue Cards
5,667	January 27, 1987	Jay Leno (guest host), Michele Lee, John Davidson, Randall "Tex" Cobb	N/A
Blue Cards
5,668	January 28, 1987	Jay Leno (guest host), Pat Sajak	Kris Kristofferson
Blue Cards
5,669	January 29, 1987	Garry Shandling (guest host), Phil Simms, Carrie Fisher, Justine Bateman	N/A
5,670	January 30, 1987	Garry Shandling (guest host), Tracey Ullman, Bob Saget, Molly Cheek	Los Lobos

=== February ===
No.	Original release date	Guest(s)	Musical/entertainment guest(s)
5,671	February 3, 1987	Paul Reiser, Lonette McKee	N/A
Foreign Commercials
5,672	February 4, 1987	George Carlin, Susan Sullivan, Sheryl Lee Ralph	N/A
Johnny comments on the U.S. retaking the America's Cup; Public Service Announcements
5,673	February 5, 1987	Ann-Margret	Phyllis Hyman
5,674	February 6, 1987	Shelley Long, Bob Nelson, Liv Ullmann	N/A
Carnac the Magnificent
5,675	February 10, 1987	Michael J. Fox, Elle Macpherson	Peter Schickele (P.D.Q. Bach Fanfare for the Royal Shaft & Her Majesty's Minuet from The Civilian Barber Suite)
Amount of Junk Mail The Average Household Gets
5,676	February 11, 1987	Tony Danza, Ellen DeGeneres	Neville Brothers
Actors That Have Never Been Nominated for An Oscar
5,677	February 12, 1987	Boris Becker, Teresa Ganzel, Gene Siskel, Roger Ebert	N/A
Mighty Carson Art Players - "Tele-Scam"
5,678	February 13, 1987	Seth Green, Angie Dickinson	Sergio Mendes
Superstitions and Phobias That are Associated to Friday the 13th
5,679	February 17, 1987	Jonathan Winters, Christina Pickles	Billy Vera & The Beaters ("I Can Take Care Of Myself")
Acronyms
5,680	February 18, 1987	Bob Uecker, David Horowitz	Ellen Greene ("Suddenly Seymour")
Trivial Pursuit; Takeoff on General Health and Safety Tips
5,681	February 19, 1987	Lily Tomlin	Ray Charles ("Mississippi Mud" and "Come Live With Me")
Many Things Stars Have Done In The Early Days to Make Ends Meet
5,682	February 20, 1987	George Segal	Maureen McGovern ("I Could've Been A Sailor")
Kid Inventors; Mighty Carson Art Players - "George Washington"
5,683	February 24, 1987	Charles Grodin, Ronnie Shakes	Leon Redbone
Mail Order Mistakes; Spoof on Ollie North; Document Shredding
5,684	February 25, 1987	Burt Reynolds, David Horowitz	The King's Singers (The Barber of Seville Overture, "Stormy Weather")
5,685	February 26, 1987	Carl Reiner, Christina Pickles	Gregory Abbott
Takeoff on local news programs during sweeps week.
5,686	February 27, 1987	Whoopi Goldberg, Bob Saget	Wang Chung ("Let's Go!" and "Everybody Have Fun Tonight")
As The White House Turns

=== March ===
No.	Original release date	Guest(s)	Musical/entertainment guest(s)
5,687	March 10, 1987	James Stewart, Carol Siskind	Eddie Daniels
Johnny does impression of Ollie North through car window; Dictionary of Regional English
5,688	March 11, 1987	Dana Carvey, Christopher Reeve	Frank Olivier (juggler)
Johnny presents lesser-known songs from newly opened Warner Bros. archives of manuscripts by Gershwin, Porter, Kern and other songwriters; Johnny does impression of Ollie North through car window.
5,689	March 12, 1987	Danny DeVito, Calvin Trillin, 4-year-old spelling prodigy Rohan Varavadekar	N/A
Evening News in 2007 with Zontar Rather
5,690	March 13, 1987	George Hamilton	Dolly Parton, Emmylou Harris, Linda Ronstadt
Blue Cards
5,691	March 17, 1987	Tim Conway, Harry Anderson	Diane Schuur
5,692	March 18, 1987	Marvelous Marvin Hagler, Alan Thicke, Rebeca Arthur	N/A
Irish Ancestry; Little Known Famous Irish People
5,693	March 19, 1987	Sherman Hemsley, Joe Garagiola, Dalton Stevens	N/A
Johnny's Oliver North Imitation & reveals the results of a Ladies' Home Journal survey & follows with his own.
5,694	March 20, 1987	Jimmy Brogan, Joseph Bologna, Dick Manley	Willie Nelson ("Always On My Mind" and "An Island In The Sea")
Homework School of The Air
5,695	March 24, 1987	Patrick Duffy, Smothers Brothers, Mykelti Williamson	N/A
Letter from Elementary School Children
5,696	March 25, 1987	John Larroquette, John Mendoza	Chris Isaak ("You Owe Me Some Kind Of Love" and "Heart Full of Soul")
El Mouldo
5,697	March 26, 1987	Dick Cavett, Vernon Ray	Stanley Jordan
5,698	March 27, 1987	Jim Fowler	Etta James
Collectibles
5,699	March 31, 1987	Gene Siskel, Roger Ebert, Connie Chung	Judy Rodman
Johnny's Oliver North Imitation

=== April ===
No.	Original release date	Guest(s)	Musical/entertainment guest(s)
5,700	April 1, 1987	Betty White, Tom Parks	N/A
Blue Cards
5,701	April 2, 1987	Woody Harrelson, Allyce Beasley	Jeffrey Osborne
Sketch - "Ask President Reagan"; Blue Cards for the President (This episode was apparently cancelled on the date Buddy Rich died.)
5,702	April 14, 1987	Rue McClanahan, Pam Matteson	Joe Snyder and The Burbank Dixieland Band ("Panama", "When The Roll Call Is Called Up There I Will Be Here")
Relationships Between Secretaries and Their Bosses
5,703	April 15, 1987	Steve Landesberg, Kathleen Wilhoite	Robert Cray
5,704	April 16, 1987	Victoria Principal, Robert Townsend	Billy Vera & The Beaters
Unlikely responses from people on the street to questions concerning how they feel about taxes.
5,705	April 17, 1987	Bob Hope, Bill Maher, Helen Hunt	N/A
Foreign Commercials
5,706	April 21, 1987	Sam Donaldson, Fred Greenlee	N/A
5,707	April 22, 1987	David Steinberg	Kenny G
Videotape of those conspiring against Johnny, spoofing the Moscow spy scandal.
5,708	April 23, 1987	Sammy Davis, Jr., Vanna White	N/A
Blue Cards
5,709	April 24, 1987	Chevy Chase, Teri Garr	N/A
A spoof on the garbage barges that are combing the Eastern Seaboard. Johnny telephones EPA in Louisiana to find out why they won't let New York's garbage be dumped in their state.
5,710	April 27, 1987	John Larroquette (guest host), Victoria Jackson, Gary Busey, Wil Shriner	N/A
Blue Cards
5,711	April 28, 1987	Garry Shandling (guest host), Joan Embery, Carol Kane, Dennis Miller	The Commodores
5,712	April 29, 1987	Garry Shandling (guest host), Kevin Nealon, Tracey Ullman, Paula Poundstone, Michael Talbot	N/A
5,713	April 30, 1987	Garry Shandling (guest host), Tony Randall, Heather Thomas, Dom Irrera	Vlasta Krsek

=== May ===
No.	Original release date	Guest(s)	Musical/entertainment guest(s)
5,714	May 1, 1987	Tony Danza (guest host), Burt Reynolds, Angie Dickinson; This is the last time a guest host other than Garry Shandling or Jay Leno hosted. Leno became the sole guest host in August of 1988.	Yellowjackets
5,715	May 5, 1987	Kristie Phillips, George C. Scott	Ray Stevens
A spoof on Burbank's 100th Anniversary with a videotape of the 'historical points of interest' in Burbank.
5,716	May 6, 1987	Father Guido Sarducci, Whitley Strieber	Nitty Gritty Dirt Band
Situation Ethics
5,717	May 7, 1987	Saundra Santiago	N/A
Advertisements for Mother's Day Gifts
5,718	May 8, 1987	Paul Reiser, Margaret Whitton, Teresa Ganzel	N/A
Mighty Carson Art Players - "Tele-Scam"; Shelly Cohen fills in for Doc & Tommy
5,719	May 12, 1987	Paul Shaffer	N/A
Stump the Band; Young Inventors
5,720	May 13, 1987	Jonathan Winters, Anne-Marie Johnson	Dwight Yoakam
The effects of the New Amnesty Law
5,721	May 14, 1987	Crispin Glover, Brett Butler, Thalassa Cruso	N/A
Politicians and Their Extra-Marital Affairs; A spoof on presidents through the years in compromising positions.
5,722	May 15, 1987	Bob Saget, Jan Gan Boyd	Vlasta Krsek
Graduation Address to The Audience
5,723	May 19, 1987	Dr. Birute Galdikas	Rosemary Clooney
Imponderable Questions
5,724	May 20, 1987	Tony Danza, Pete Barbutti, Sally Love	N/A
Blue Cards
5,725	May 21, 1987	Eddie Murphy, Ellen DeGeneres, Jane Leeves, Teresa Ganzel	N/A
Mighty Carson Art Players - "Eyewitless News"
5,726	May 22, 1987	Carol Kane	Leonard Waxdeck & The Birdcallers, Jonathan Butler
A soap opera spoof of the congressional hearings, 'As The World Turns'.
5,727	May 26, 1987	Pat Sajak, Ritch Shydner, Christina Pickles	N/A
Johnny and the Tonight Show decide to pay homage to the garbage scow crew by putting on a USO show for them, including entertainment and beautiful women for their amusement.
5,728	May 27, 1987	Crispin Glover, Gore Vidal	k.d. lang
Objects Bought at the PTL Auction
5,729	May 28, 1987	Gregory Peck	Peter Schickele, The Leningrad Dixieland Band
5,730	May 29, 1987	Arnold Schwarzenegger	Anita Baker ("No One in the World")
Stump the Band

=== June ===
No.	Original release date	Guest(s)	Musical/entertainment guest(s)
5,731	June 9, 1987	Madonna	Ray Charles
Takeoff of the Senate hearings, featuring Fawn Hall (Johnny portrays Sen. Inouye); Fun Facts About the Constitution
5,732	June 10, 1987	Stephanie Petit (1987 Scripps National Spelling Bee champion), Dennis Miller	Randy Graff ("I Dreamed a Dream")
Public Service Announcements
5,733	June 11, 1987	Dudley Moore, Tom Parks	Grover Washington Jr.
Cause and Effect Relationships in The Stock Market; Economic Trends
5,734	June 12, 1987	Buddy Hackett	Ladysmith Black Mambazo
Pictures of President Reagan and Mrs. Reagan in Italy
5,735	June 16, 1987	Tim Conway	George Benson, Peking Acrobats
Constitutional Amendments
5,736	June 17, 1987	Magic Johnson, Bill Alexander	Bernadette Peters ("Broadway Baby")
5,737	June 18, 1987	Steve Martin	Art Garfunkel ("I Only Have Eyes for You")
Johnny spoofs the Tonight Show as a public service outlet for tourists who need to accept emergency phone calls.
5,738	June 19, 1987	Jerry Seinfeld, Veronica Cartwright	Billy Vera & The Beaters
Blue Cards
5,739	June 23, 1987	Mel Brooks	Crosby, Stills, & Nash ("Southern Cross" and "Teach Your Children")
The Tonight Show version of the USA Today's survey on America's view of TV.
5,740	June 24, 1987	Carl Reiner, Jester Hairston	k.d. lang
The Tonight Show version of the tabloids.; Psychic Predictions
5,740	June 25, 1987	Dan Aykroyd, Bobby Kelton, Helen Shaver	N/A
Paying Money to Touch Vanna White's Dress
5,741	June 26, 1987	Robert Klein, William F. Buckley, Jr.	Glenn Medeiros ("Nothing's Gonna Change My Love for You")

=== July ===
No.	Original release date	Guest(s)	Musical/entertainment guest(s)
5,742	July 21, 1987	Joe Piscopo, Paul Reiser, Maryam d'Abo	N/A
"Nightline" (with Joe Piscopo as Ted Koppel who interviews President Reagan (Johnny Carson))
5,743	July 22, 1987	Patrick Duffy, Prof. Jearl Walker	N/A
Desk - Johnny gives Doc Severinsen the third degree about not declaring his Italian suits at U.S. Customs. Doc also shows pictures of his tour with the NBC Orchestra.
5,744	July 23, 1987	George Segal, Gene Siskel, Roger Ebert	N/A
Johnny spoofs Pete Holm and his much lauded but little known singing career; Blue Cards
5,745	July 24, 1987	Mark Harmon, Barry Sobel, Charles Batton	N/A
Desk - Johnny does a bit with pictures of John Poindexter whispering to his lawyer during the Iran-Contra hearings.
5,746	July 28, 1987	Harry Anderson, David Barker	Pete Fountain
Quickie Books
5,747	July 29, 1987	Pat Cash, Ray Combs, John Clark Gable	N/A
Baseball Facts
5,748	July 30, 1987	David Steinberg, Emily Lloyd	N/A
The Tonight Show version of what Pete Holm is really saying in the record.
5,749	July 31, 1987	Penelope Ann Miller, Robert Townsend	Sheena Easton ("Strut" and "Still Willing To Try")
As The White House Turns

=== August ===
No.	Original release date	Guest(s)	Musical/entertainment guest(s)
5,750	August 4, 1987	Graham Chapman	Midori
Translations of Useful Traveling Expressions in Foreign Languages
5,751	August 5, 1987	Allyce Beasley	Dionne Warwick
Blue Cards
5,752	August 6, 1987	Tom Selleck, Carol Kane	Eddie Daniels
New Products
5,753	August 7, 1987	Jay Leno, Pat Sajak	Diane Schuur
Stump the Band
5,754	August 10, 1987	Jay Leno (guest host), Annette Funicello, Frankie Avalon, Woody Harrelson	Spyro Gyra
Statistics From Harper's Index
5,755	August 11, 1987	Jay Leno (guest host), Connie Chung, Fritz Coleman, Jami Gertz	N/A
Products with Funny Names
5,756	August 12, 1987	Jay Leno (guest host), Ron Reagan, Jesse Ventura	N/A
Movie Posters
5,757	August 13, 1987	Jay Leno (guest host), Beverly D'Angelo, Jimmie Walker	Los Lobos ("La Bamba")
Mistakes in Newspapers
5,758	August 14, 1987	Jay Leno (guest host), Larry King, Michele Lee, Roy Blount, Jr.	N/A
Junk Food for College Kids who are Returning to Campus
5,759	August 25, 1987	Joan Embery, Bob Nelson	N/A
Harmonic Convergence and the Mayan Prophecies
5,760	August 26, 1987	Dana Carvey, Mildred Holt	Melissa Manchester
Post Cards and Examples of the types of things people send to the folks back home when they are on vacation.
5,761	August 27, 1987	Buddy Hackett, Rick Rossovich	Michael Martin Murphey
Crime Figures
5,762	August 28, 1987	Shelley Winters, Tom Parks	N/A
Desk - Johnny calls Irwindale, California spokesman Xavier Hermosillo regarding the Los Angeles Raiders possible move to their community.

=== September ===
No.	Original release date	Guest(s)	Musical/entertainment guest(s)
5,763	September 1, 1987	Jon Lovitz, Paul Sorvino	Abbe Jaye
Network Television Slogans
5,764	September 2, 1987	Christina Pickles, John Mendoza, Kayaker Ed Gillet	N/A
Doc's gardening experience with tomatoes
5,765	September 3, 1987	Lauren Bacall, Victoria Jackson	The Temptations
A spoof on feeding the Pope in the commissary, complete with a Pope look-alike.
5,766	September 4, 1987	Bob Saget, David Horowitz	David Sanborn
Carnac the Magnificent
5,767	September 7, 1987	Jay Leno (guest host), Steve Allen, Lynn Redgrave, Tim Reid	N/A
Examples of Flowery Language for Simple Ideas
5,768	September 8, 1987	Jay Leno (guest host), Anthony Perkins, Vanna White	The Judds
5,769	September 9, 1987	Jay Leno (guest host), Michael J. Fox, Deidre Hall	N/A
Newspaper Headlines with Double Meanings
5,770	September 10, 1987	Jay Leno (guest host), Bert Convy, Annie Potts, Erma Bombeck	N/A
Jay does a "Koppelesque" interview with President Reagan.
5,771	September 11, 1987	Jay Leno (guest host), Carrie Fisher, Dennis Weaver	The Charlie Daniels Band
Headlines; Spoof of Ted Koppel doing a Nightline segment with Jay.
5,772	September 14, 1987	Jay Leno (guest host), Sandy Duncan, Joan Van Ark	Donna Summer
Headlines; Comparisons Between Lincoln & Reagan
5,773	September 16, 1987	Joe Garagiola, Dennis Wolfberg, Lisa Jane Persky	N/A
Quiz for Married Couples on How to Make Your Marriage Last
5,774	September 17, 1987	Bob Newhart, Courteney Cox	B.B. King ("Payin' the Cost" and "When It All Comes Down")
Paraphernalia for the Pope's Visit
5,775	September 18, 1987	Dabney Coleman, Paul Reiser	Joe Williams
Blue Cards
5,776	September 21, 1987	Jay Leno (guest host), Charlton Heston, Kathryn Harrold, Malcolm Forbes	N/A
Headlines; Real Claims Filed with an Insurance Company with Strange Descriptions
5,777	September 23, 1987	Dudley Moore, Bob Uecker, Kirstie Alley, Teresa Ganzel	N/A
List of Awful Shows That Have Been Rendered Service to The Public Well Being
5,778	September 24, 1987	Denise Parker, JoAnne Astrow, Isabella Rossellini	N/A
Bass Solo
5,779	September 25, 1987	Don Johnson, David Brenner, Dale Robertson	N/A
The Tonight Show version of modernized classic tales.
5,780	September 28, 1987	Garry Shandling (guest host), Justine Bateman, Blake Clark, Rob Reiner	Cirque du Soleil
5,781	September 29, 1987	Garry Shandling (guest host), Dave Coulier, Emma Samms	Gloria Estefan and Miami Sound Machine
5,782	September 30, 1987	Garry Shandling (guest host), Susan Sullivan, Cathy Guisewite, Kirk Cameron, Bill Maher	N/A

=== October ===
No.	Original release date	Guest(s)	Musical/entertainment guest(s)
5,783	October 5, 1987	Jay Leno (guest host), Joanna Kerns, Wil Shriner, Jason Bateman	N/A
Products and Complaints Which Have Elicited Lawsuits; Headlines; Disabilities Claims
5,784	October 7, 1987	Betty White, Barry Sobel	Tiffany ("I Think We're Alone Now")
Earthquake Tips
5,785	October 8, 1987	John Larroquette, Paulina Porizkova	Kenny G
The Networks New Fall Shows
5,786	October 9, 1987	Patrick Swayze, A. Whitney Brown, Alexandra Paul	N/A
Blue Cards
5,787	October 12, 1987	Jay Leno (guest host), Valerie Harper, Brian Dennehy, Florence Henderson	Stanley Jordan
5,788	October 14, 1987	Madeline Kahn, Don Rickles	Michael Franks
As The White House Turns
5,789	October 15, 1987	Tim Conway, Kevin Rooney, Jester Hairston, Donald O. Cram	N/A
Tim Conway plays retiring quarterback Chubs Horton
5,790	October 16, 1987	Myrtle Young	James Galway
How Americans Spend Their Time
5,791	October 19, 1987	Jay Leno (guest host), Jacqueline Bisset, James Brolin	N/A
Bizarre Laws That Are Part of The Judicial Process in Certain Parts of the Country
5,792	October 21, 1987	Helen Shaver, Calvin Trillin	George Benson
Classes Available through UCLA Extension
5,793	October 22, 1987	Robert Klein, Connie Lew	N/A
Memorabilia from the year Johnny was born.
5,794	October 23, 1987	David Letterman, Joe Piscopo	Cutting Crew
Sketch - "Elliott Ganway"
5,795	October 26, 1987	Jay Leno (guest host), Brian Bonsall, Marilu Henner, Fred Dryer	Anita Pointer
5,796	October 27, 1987	Jay Leno (guest host), Donna Mills, Paul Reiser	Linda Hopkins
5,797	October 28, 1987	Jay Leno (guest host), John Davidson, Judge Joseph Wapner	Cirque du Soleil
Headlines
5,798	October 29, 1987	Jay Leno (guest host), Tyne Daly, Alan Thicke, Mary Hart	N/A
Headlines; Jay has an NBC Satellite Interview with President Reagan on the possibility of the summit with the Soviets.
5,799	October 30, 1987	Jay Leno (guest host), Joan Embery, Robert Klein, Corbin Bernsen	N/A
Postcards from U.S. Towns with Interesting Names; Jay's interview with Vice-President Bush

=== November ===
No.	Original release date	Guest(s)	Musical/entertainment guest(s)
5,800	November 3, 1987	George C. Scott, JoAnne Astrow, The Amazing Randi	N/A
Johnny was presented a silvered rubber chicken for his birthday that has an inscription, 'Hic Cluckus Haltus'- roughly translated for 'The Joke Stops Here!'
5,801	November 4, 1987	Candice Bergen, Cathy Guisewite	Frances Ruffelle ("On My Own")
Long List of Possible Supreme Court Nominees
5,802	November 5, 1987	Chuck Berry	Chuck Berry ("Memphis Tennessee" and "Roll Over Beethoven")
5,803	November 6, 1987	Shelley Long, Mabel Gaskill	Steve Lawrence
Slogans That are Now Associated with One Product That Were First Tried Out on Another
5,804	November 10, 1987	James Stewart, Paula Poundstone	Linda Hopkins
Johnny's story about the little cut on his hand.
5,805	November 11, 1987	Arnold Schwarzenegger, Thalassa Cruso	Rosanne Cash ("Tennessee Flat Top Box")
5,806	November 12, 1987	Carl Reiner, Jeff Cesario, Holly Robinson	N/A
The Royal Couple's Troubled Marriage
5,807	November 13, 1987	Farrah Fawcett, Gene Siskel, Roger Ebert	The Ed Shaughnessy Quartet
A tape of interviews of last night's audience members on the topic of Judge Wapner's nomination.
5,808	November 17, 1987	Jay Leno, George Miller, Jayne Atkinson	N/A
Recommendations of Shows to See During Sweeps Month
5,809	November 18, 1987	Paul Reiser, Rebeca Arthur	Diane Schuur
Public Service Announcements
5,810	November 19, 1987	Saundra Santiago, Bill Maher, Hailey Nance	N/A
Cosmopolitan Quiz about Neuroses
5,811	November 20, 1987	Ted Danson, Steven Wright, Nicholas Pryor	N/A
Sketch - "Kafeen - Icelandic Bugle Player"
5,812	November 24, 1987	Harvey Korman, Cathy Guisewite	Bourgeois Tagg
Since most of the audience are from out of town, Johnny decides to perform a public service by relaying messages from friends and neighbors who were looking over audience members' houses.
5,813	November 25, 1987	Jonathan Winters, Bob Pohle	Icehouse
Answers from Elementary School Children to Several Thanksgiving Questions
5,814	November 26, 1987	Lane Smith, Louie Anderson	Jack Jones
New Products
5,815	November 27, 1987	David Steinberg, Jann Karam, Don Yesso	N/A
Examples of Shop Discounts; Foreign Commercials - 'Kaiser Beer', a man at the urinal, 'Amway', 'BASF Tape', and 'Hamlet Cigars'.
5,816	November 30, 1987	Jay Leno (guest host), Vincent Price, Susan Ruttan, Melvin Kiser	Joe Williams
Jay points out an L.A. Herald Headline, 'California's Death Penalty Gets Tougher'.

=== December ===
No.	Original release date	Guest(s)	Musical/entertainment guest(s)
5,817	December 1, 1987	Jay Leno (guest host), Tracey Ullman, Patrick Swayze, Bill Alexander	Sheila E.
5,818	December 2, 1987	Jay Leno (guest host), Tom Snyder	Oak Ridge Boys
Real Notices from Real Newspapers
5,819	December 3, 1987	Jay Leno (guest host), Connie Sellecca, Paul Provenza	John Denver ("Today is The Day My Life Starts All Over Again" and "For You")
5,820	December 4, 1987	Jay Leno (guest host), Billy Crystal, Christina Pickles	10,000 Maniacs ("Peace Train", "Don't Talk")
New Products
5,821	December 7, 1987	Jay Leno (guest host), Calvin Trillin	Roy Orbison, k.d. lang
Facial Photographs of Famous People
5,822	December 9, 1987	Merv Griffin	Linda Ronstadt
List of Christmas TV Specials from the Hollywood Reporter
5,823	December 10, 1987	David Brenner	Ray Charles
Opinions for Possible New Carpets for the set; Spoof on Santa's Naughty or Nice List
5,824	December 11, 1987	Danny DeVito, Yakov Smirnoff	Pointer Sisters, "Santa Claus Is Coming To Town"
Mighty Carson Art Players - "Reagan/Gorbachev Summit"
5,825	December 14, 1987	Jay Leno (guest host), Debbie Reynolds, Robert Townsend	Air Supply
What Russians Left Behind in Their Hotel Rooms
5,826	December 16, 1987	Bob Uecker	Colm Wilkinson
New Products
5,827	December 17, 1987	Jack Paar	N/A
New Products; Kids' Letters to Santa Claus
5,828	December 18, 1987	Robin Williams, Bob Hope	Tony Bennett ("White Christmas")
Master Pre-Christmas List
5,829	December 28, 1987	Jay Leno (guest host), John Davidson, Robert Conrad, Connie Chung	N/A
Jay reads material from real newspapers.
5,830	December 30, 1987	Gregory Peck, Argus Hamilton	B.B. King
Predictions for The New Year
5,831	December 31, 1987	Smothers Brothers	Daniel Rosen
New Year's Eve Signs; Singing Dog Contest
