= Guy Branum =

American comedian and writer (born 1975)

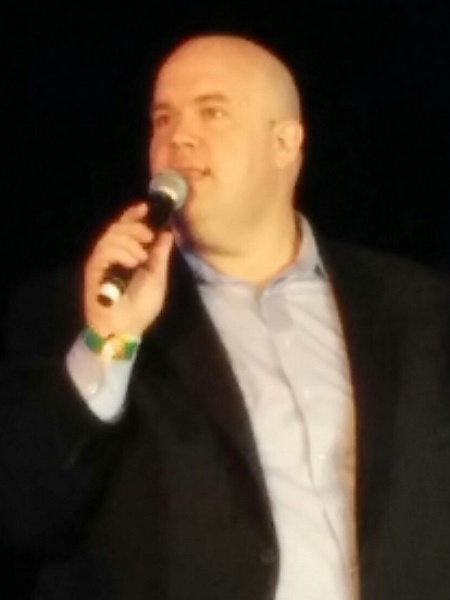
- Branum in 2015
- Born: November 12, 1975 (age 50); Marysville, California, U.S.
- Education: University of California, Berkeley (BA); University of Minnesota (JD)
- Occupations: Actor; comedian; writer
- Years active: 2002–present

Guy Branum (/ˈbrænəm/) (born November 12, 1975) is an American actor, comedian, and writer. He was a regular panelist on Chelsea Lately on the E! network, and host of the podcast Pop Rocket on the Maximum Fun network and TruTV's Talk Show the Game Show. He co-starred in the movie Bros. He appeared as a contestant on the game show Jeopardy! on April 4, 2025, and subsequently in the 2025 Second Chance tournament on December 22 of the same year.

== Early life ==
Branum was raised in Yuba City, California, by a Protestant father and Jewish mother. He attended the University of California, Berkeley, where he double-majored in history and political science. During his time at Berkeley, he wrote a column for the Daily Californian, which resulted in a visit from the United States Secret Service to his apartment in November 1997, just before the Big Game between Berkeley and Stanford University. The Associated Press had misquoted parts of his article, suggesting that he implied Berkeley students should harm then-Stanford freshman Chelsea Clinton.

After completing his studies at Berkeley, Branum moved to Minnesota to attend the University of Minnesota Law School, where he was a member of the school's Quiz Bowl team that finished in third place at the College Bowl nationals in 1999. While in law school, he publicly came out as gay. After graduating, he returned to California.

== Career ==
After being recommended by co-hostess Laura Swisher, Branum was hired as a writer for the TechTV program Unscrewed with Martin Sargent. He also contributed to the comedy podcast Weezy and the Swish. In December 2007, Branum became a writer and an onscreen comedy performer on Chelsea Lately. He made his feature film debut in January 2011 in No Strings Attached. In 2012, Branum became a writer for the show Totally Biased with W. Kamau Bell, performing a recurring segment "No More Mr. Nice Gay." He appeared in the eighth season of Last Comic Standing. In 2017, Branum performed at the inaugural Portland Queer Comedy Festival.

He was the host and executive producer of Talk Show The Game Show on TruTV, which was canceled in November 2018.

He was the regular host of Pop Rocket, a podcast that dissects popular culture, on the Maximum Fun network, which was cancelled in May 2019.

His book My Life as a Goddess: A Memoir Through (Un)Popular Culture was published in 2018 with a foreword by Mindy Kaling.

He is a frequent guest on the podcasts Wait Wait... Don't Tell Me! and Doug Loves Movies with Doug Benson.

Branum released his first comedy album, Effable, in 2015 on Aspecialthing Records.

Branum won an Emmy Award for his writing on Hacks at the 77th Primetime Emmy Awards. He has also received a Golden Globe, PGA Award, and WGA Award.
