= Media Path Podcast =

American podcast

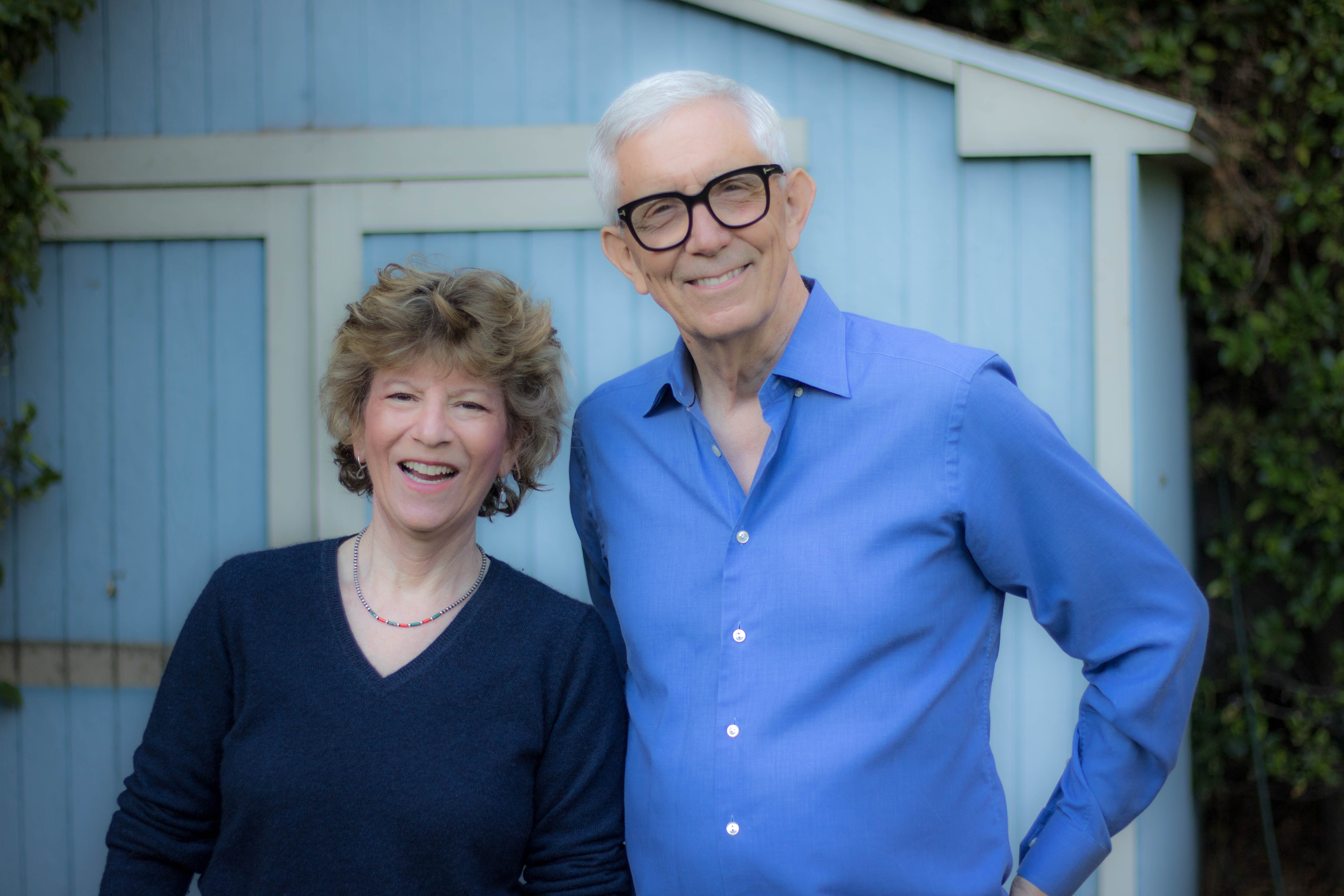

Presentation
- Hosted by: Fritz Coleman and Louise Palanker
- Genre: Talk
- Format: Audio; video
- Language: English
- Length: 60–90 minutes

Production
- Video format: YouTube
- Audio format: MP3
- No. of episodes: 158 (as of April 2023)

Publication
- Original release: July 30, 2020
- Provider: Spotify (2020–present)

Related
- Website: www.mediapathpodcast.com

Media Path Podcast is a podcast hosted by Fritz Coleman and Louise Palanker that covers news, entertainment, and people.

== Background ==
The podcast began in 2020 after Coleman retired from his decades-long position as a weatherman at KNBC in Los Angeles. Palanker is a broadcasting veteran and co-founder of Premiere Radio Networks (now a division of iHeartMedia). Palanker and Coleman have known each other for 30 years. Palanker produced Coleman's first two one-person shows. The show has over 100 episodes. The show releases episodes on a weekly basis. Palanker started podcasting in 2005 and has been a part of five different podcasts. Coleman and Palanker discuss film, TV, books, music, current headlines, politics, history, true crime and world events. The podcast focuses on politics, news, and entertainment.

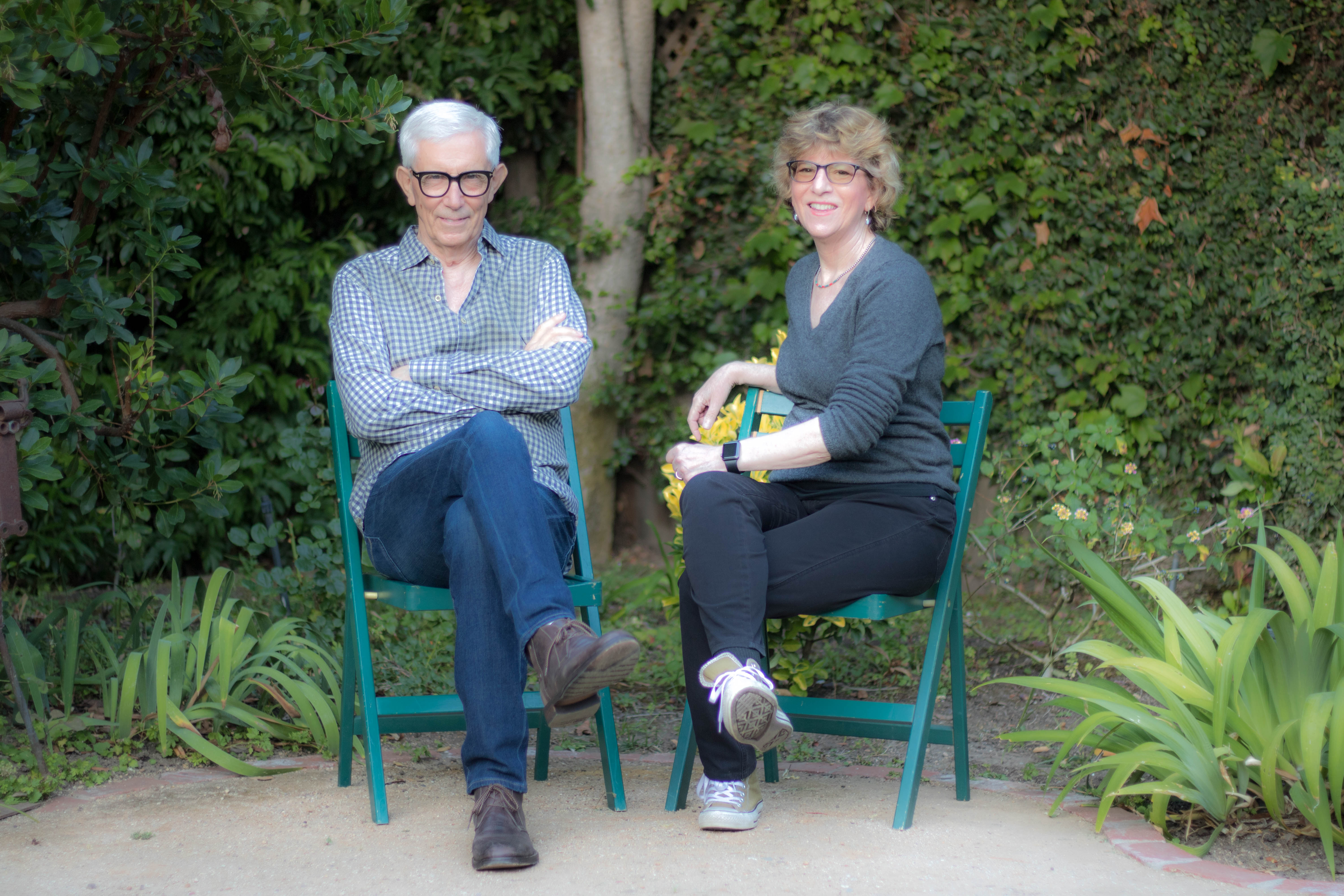

Their guests have included Rep. Adam Schiff, Henry Winkler, Ed Begley Jr., political writer Ira Shapiro, comedian Maz Jobrani, Grammy-winning songwriter Diane Warren, Double Dare (franchise) host Marc Summers, Saturday-morning TV producer Marty Krofft, Cindy Williams, Christopher Knight (actor), The Cowsills, Pat Boone, Keith Morrison, Butch Patrick, John Sebastian, The Cowsills, Peter Noone, Bill Medley, Gary Puckett, and Jan Perry, executive director of Shelter Partnership, which helps homeless people in Los Angeles.
