= Garry Shandling =

American comedian (1949–2016)

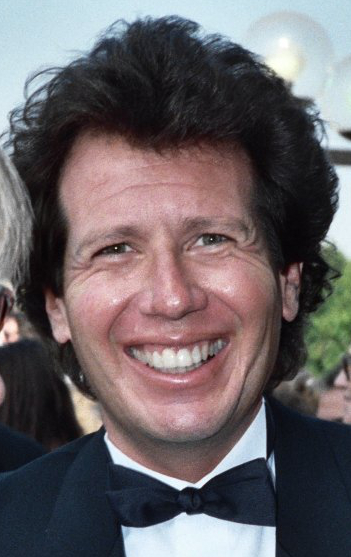
- Shandling in 1987
- Born: November 29, 1949; Chicago, Illinois, U.S.
- Died: March 24, 2016 (aged 66); Santa Monica, California, U.S.
- Occupations: Actor; comedian; filmmaker
- Years active: 1975–2016
- Notable work: It’s Garry Shandling’s Show; The Larry Sanders Show
- Style: Comedy
- Partner(s): Linda Doucett (1987–1994)
- Website: https://garryshandling.com/

Garry Emmanuel Shandling (November 29, 1949 – March 24, 2016) was an American actor, comedian, and filmmaker.

Shandling began his career writing for sitcoms, such as Sanford and Son and Welcome Back, Kotter. He made a successful stand-up performance on The Tonight Show Starring Johnny Carson where he became a frequent guest host. Shandling was, for a time, considered the leading contender to replace Johnny Carson. In 1986, he created It's Garry Shandling's Show, which aired on Showtime. It was nominated for four Emmy Awards (including one for Shandling) and lasted until 1990.

Shandling's second show, The Larry Sanders Show, began airing on HBO in 1992. He was nominated for 18 Emmy Awards for the show and won the Primetime Emmy Award for Outstanding Writing for a Comedy Series in 1998, along with Peter Tolan, for writing the series finale. In film, he had a recurring role in the Marvel Cinematic Universe, appearing in Iron Man 2 (2010) and Captain America: The Winter Soldier (2014). He also lent his voice to Verne the turtle in Over the Hedge (2006). Shandling's final performance was as the voice of Ikki in the live-action remake of The Jungle Book (2016). The film released posthumously.

During his four-decade career, Shandling was nominated for 19 Primetime Emmy Awards and two Golden Globe Awards, along with many other awards and nominations. He served as host of the Grammy Awards four times and as host of the Emmy Awards two times.

== Early life ==
Garry Emmanuel Shandling was born into a Jewish family in Chicago on November 29, 1949, the son of pet store proprietor Muriel Estelle (née Singer) and print shop owner Irving Shandling. He grew up in the Casa Loma Estates area of Tucson, Arizona, having moved there with his family so that his older brother Barry could receive treatment for cystic fibrosis. Barry died of the disease when Shandling was 10. After graduating from Palo Verde High School, Shandling attended the University of Arizona to major in electrical engineering, but instead completed a degree in marketing and pursued a year of postgraduate studies in creative writing.

== Career ==
=== Early work ===
When Shandling was 19, he drove two hours to a club in Phoenix and showed some jokes to George Carlin, who was performing there. The next day, on a repeat round-trip, Carlin told him that he had "funny stuff on every page" and should keep at it. In 1973, he moved to Los Angeles and worked at an advertising agency for a time, then sold a script for the popular NBC sitcom Sanford and Son. He also wrote scripts for the sitcom Welcome Back, Kotter and attended a story meeting for Three's Company.

=== Stand-up comedy ===
Shandling said that he became a stand-up comedian because of an incident that happened one day at a story meeting for Three's Company, in which one of the show's producers complained about a line of dialogue and said, "Well, Chrissy wouldn't say that." He recalled, "I just looked. I said, 'I don't think I can do this.' And I stopped right there and went on to perform."

In 1978, Shandling performed his first stand-up routine at The Comedy Store. A year later, he was one of the few performers to cross the picket line when a group of comedians organized a boycott against the Comedy Store, protesting owner Mitzi Shore's policy of not paying comedians to perform. According to William Knoedelseder, Shandling "was the scion of a family with decidedly antiunion views. He had not shared the struggling comic experience. He was a successful sitcom writer trying to break into stand-up, and prior to the strike, Shore had refused to put him in the regular lineup because she didn't think he was good enough. Of course, that changed the minute he crossed the picket line."

Shandling's onstage persona was an anxiety-ridden, nervous, uptight, conservative man on the verge of a breakdown. After a couple of years on the road, he was booked by a talent scout from The Tonight Show Starring Johnny Carson to appear as a guest in 1981. Shandling substituted for Carson on a regular basis until 1987, when he left to focus on his cable show, leaving Jay Leno as permanent guest host and Carson's eventual successor.

In 1984, Shandling performed his first stand-up special, Garry Shandling: Alone in Vegas for Showtime, followed by a second televised special in 1986, The Garry Shandling Show: 25th Anniversary Special, also for Showtime. In 1991, a third special, Garry Shandling: Stand-Up, was part of the HBO Comedy Hour.

=== Television series ===
==== It's Garry Shandling's Show ====
In 1985, Shandling and Alan Zweibel went on to create It's Garry Shandling's Show. Through 1990, it ran for 72 episodes on Showtime. The edited reruns played on the Fox network beginning in 1988. Shandling wrote 15 of the episodes.

The series subverted the standard sitcom format by having its characters openly acknowledge that they were all part of a television series. Building on a concept that hearkened back to The George Burns and Gracie Allen Show, in which George Burns would frequently break the "fourth wall" and speak directly to the audience, Shandling's series went so far as to incorporate the audience and elements of the studio itself into the storylines, calling attention to the show's artifice.

The series was nominated for four Emmy Awards, including one for Shandling. He won an American Comedy Award for Funniest Male Performance in a Series; and four CableACE awards, two for Best Comedy Series. The show also won an award for Outstanding Achievement in Comedy from the Television Critics Association.

==== The Larry Sanders Show ====
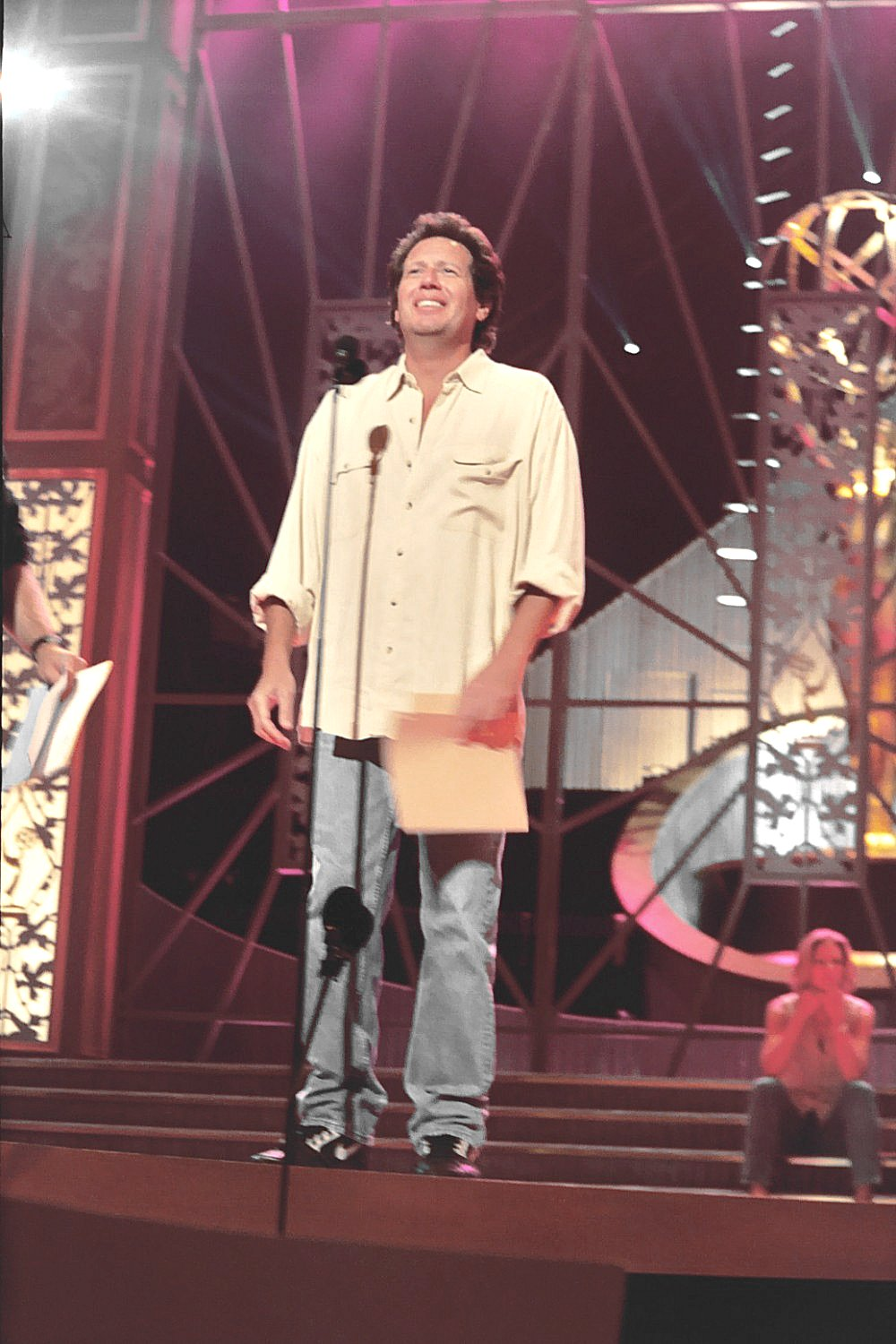
Shandling during the 1994 Emmy Awards rehearsals

In 1992, Shandling launched another critical and commercial success by creating the mock behind-the-scenes talk show sitcom The Larry Sanders Show, which ran for 89 episodes through to 1998 on HBO. It garnered 56 Emmy Award nominations and three wins. Shandling based the series on his experiences guest-hosting The Tonight Show Starring Johnny Carson.

In 1993, NBC offered Shandling $5 million to take over Late Night when David Letterman announced his highly publicized move to CBS, but Shandling declined. He was subsequently offered The Late Late Show, but also declined in favor of continuing The Larry Sanders Show.

Shandling wrote 38 episodes of the series and directed three in its final season. He was nominated for 18 Emmy Awards for the series: five for acting, seven for writing, and six for being co-executive producer with Brad Grey. He won one Emmy Award for Outstanding Writing in a Comedy Series for the series finale "Flip." He was also nominated for two Golden Globe Awards for Best Actor (Musical or Comedy) in 1994 and 1995. He won two American Comedy Awards for Funniest Male Performance in a Comedy Series, eight CableACE Awards, and a BAFTA Award. The series influenced other shows, such as Entourage, 30 Rock, and Curb Your Enthusiasm, where guest stars portray themselves.

In 2002, TV Guide named The Larry Sanders Show as 38th Greatest Show of All Time. In 2008, Entertainment Weekly ranked it the 28th in the "100 best shows from 1983 to 2008" list, and it was included on Time magazine's 100 Greatest Shows of All Time.

The first season was re-released in 2007, along with a Not Just the Best of the Larry Sanders Show, Shandling's picks of the best 23 episodes.

In October 2012, Shandling returned with fellow cast members from The Larry Sanders Show for Entertainment Weekly's Reunions issue, where he was reunited with co-stars Rip Torn, Jeffrey Tambor, Sarah Silverman, Penny Johnson Jerald, Wallace Langham and Mary Lynn Rajskub.

=== Other work ===
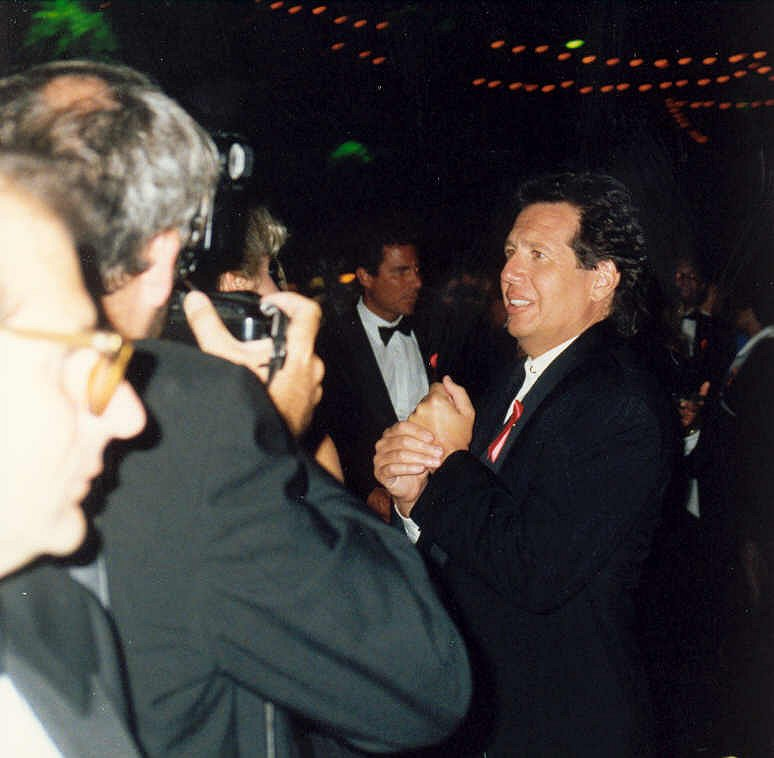
Shandling at the 1992 Emmy Awards

Shandling hosted the Grammy Awards in 1990, 1991, 1993 and 1994. He hosted the Emmy Awards in 2000 and 2004, and co-hosted (doing the opening monologue) in 2003. He appeared occasionally in films, beginning with a cameo as Mr. Vertisey in The Night We Never Met. He had supporting roles in Love Affair and Mixed Nuts; Dr. Dolittle (1998), as the voice of a live-action pigeon; the David Rabe play adaptation Hurlyburly (1998); and Trust the Man (2001). He wrote and starred in Mike Nichols's What Planet Are You From? (2000) and co-starred with Warren Beatty and others in Town & Country (2001).

In October 1999, Shandling, with David Rensin, published Confessions of a Late Night Talk Show Host: The Autobiography of Larry Sanders, written in the voice of his alter-ego Larry Sanders.

He also appeared in a brief cameo in Zoolander (2001). Shandling also co-starred as Verne in Over the Hedge (2006), which became one of his best-known roles. He appeared in Iron Man 2 (2010) as Senator Stern, and reprised the role in Captain America: The Winter Soldier (2014). He appeared in an uncredited cameo as a health inspector in The Dictator (2012).

He starred as himself representing Fox Mulder, alongside Téa Leoni as Dana Scully in The X-Files season 7 spoof episode "Hollywood A.D."

In February 2010, Shandling was staying at the same Waipio Valley hotel that Conan O'Brien checked into after his departure from The Tonight Show. They spent their entire vacations together, Shandling helping to rehabilitate O'Brien.

Shandling was a longtime friend of Jerry Seinfeld. In 2016, two months before his death, he appeared on Seinfeld's show Comedians in Cars Getting Coffee.

== Personal life ==
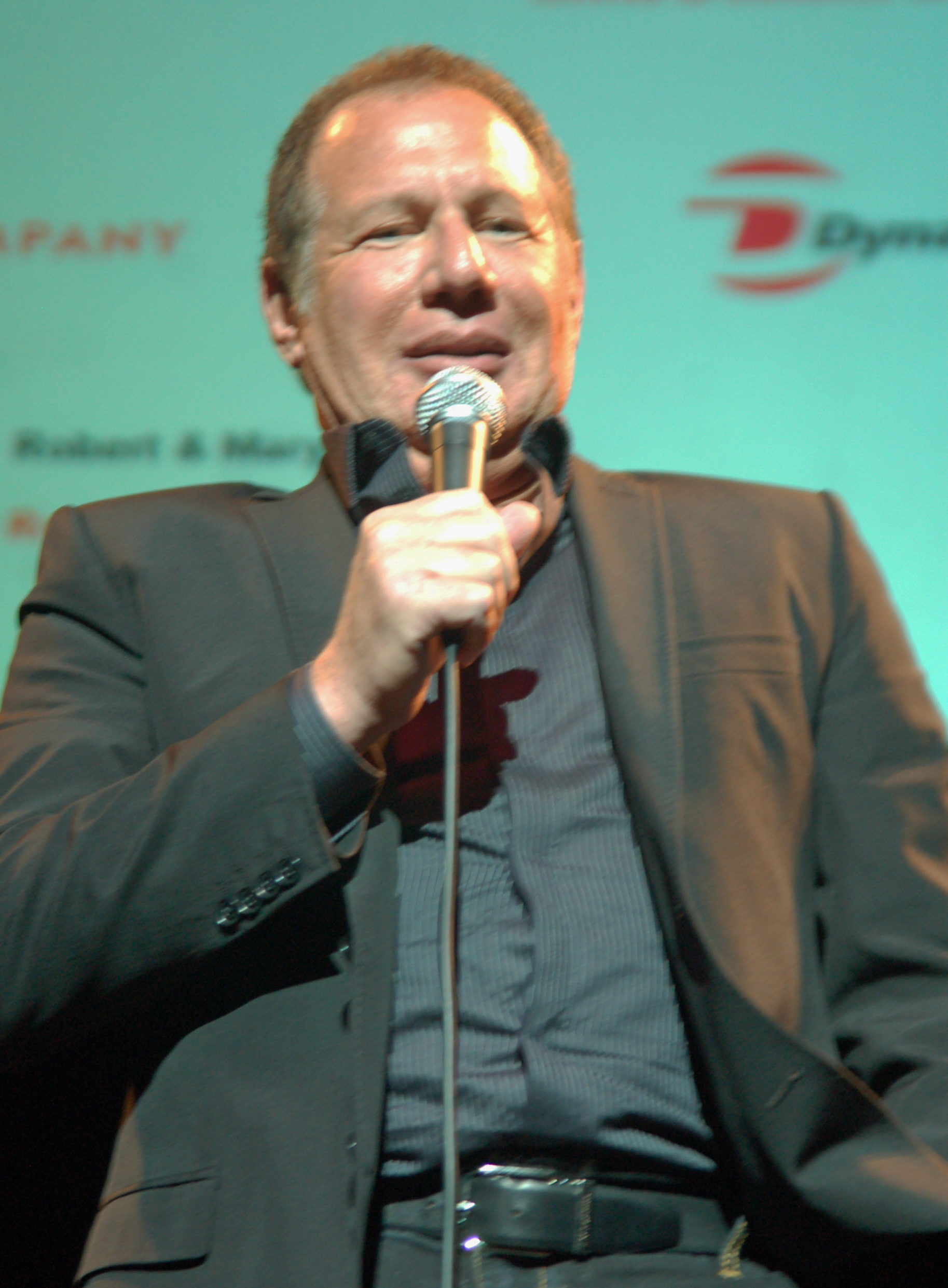
Shandling in April 2011

In 1976, Shandling was involved in a car crash in Encino that left him in critical condition for two days and hospitalized for two weeks with a crushed spleen. While in the hospital, he had a near-death experience and later said, "I had a vivid near-death experience that involved a voice asking, 'Do you want to continue leading Garry Shandling's life?' Without thinking, I said, 'Yes.' Since then, I've been stuck living in the physical world while knowing, without a doubt, that there's something much more meaningful within it all. That realization is what drives my life and work." The accident inspired him to pursue a career in comedy, and he later turned the accident into part of his routine.

Shandling never married and had no children. He shared an apartment with his fiancée, actress Linda Doucett, from 1987 until they split in 1994. He subsequently had her dismissed from The Larry Sanders Show, and she filed a lawsuit against his production company Brillstein Entertainment Partners for sexual discrimination and wrongful termination. The case was settled out of court in 1997 for $1 million.

Although Doucett sued him and the show's producer, when Shandling died Doucett shared some details of their time together, including that the only reason they split in 1994 was that he didn't want to enlarge his family. She was in her late 30s and early 40s during their relationship, she wanted children, and Shandling was afraid his children might be born with cystic fibrosis, the genetic problem that killed his brother Barry. However, he later stated in a 1998 interview by Charlie Rose that he was still contemplating the possibility of having children.

Shandling and Sharon Stone were students of acting coach Roy London and dated briefly, and she appeared on The Larry Sanders Show in the episode "The Mr. Sharon Stone Show." They remained close friends until Shandling's death in 2016. In the documentary Special Thanks to Roy London, interviews with Stone and Shandling discuss their relationship. A Los Angeles Times article reads:

His interest in Zen certainly must have primed him for Roy London, the acting teacher who received a "special thanks" credit on every episode of The Larry Sanders Show and whom Shandling calls "the most important man ever in my life". [Shandling said] "A lot of questions I had about life and about art and psychology he had answers to. And he was guiding people in that class to eliminate everything but their essence and just be, so you're working on life and acting at the same time."

Shandling preferred to reveal little about his personal life during interviews. He was a Buddhist who enjoyed meditating, playing basketball, and boxing four times per week. He co-owned a boxing gym in Santa Monica, TSB 44 (Tough Strong Bold No. 44), with actor and director Peter Berg. He was also a licensed amateur radio operator. Starting as a teenager, he held the callsigns WA7BKG, KD6OY, and KQ6KA. The latter he held with a pseudonym, Dave Waddell, to avoid undue attention when he operated.

== Death and aftermath ==
On March 24, 2016, Shandling died from pulmonary embolism, a blood clot that traveled from his leg to his lungs. He died at Saint John's Health Center in Santa Monica, California, at the age of 66. The LAPD reported that he had suddenly collapsed in his home and was rushed to the hospital, suffering from an apparent medical emergency. When paramedics arrived, he was unconscious. He had felt unwell during a trip to Hawaii and had complained to a doctor about shortness of breath and leg pain. Shandling had suffered from hyperparathyroidism, a disease that often goes undiagnosed or untreated.

Shandling left behind a liquid estate worth around $668,000, which was given to his lawyer and best friend Bill Isaacson, as Shandling had no family or relatives. However, the bulk of his wealth was held in a private trust he had created. On February 4, 2019, his estate bestowed $15.2 million to benefit medical research at the David Geffen School of Medicine at UCLA. His gift established and endowed the Garry Shandling Endocrine Surgery Research Fund, the Garry Shandling Infectious Diseases Innovation Fund, and the Garry Shandling Pancreatic Diseases Fund. The remainder of the bequest established the Garry Shandling Medical Research Fund, operated under the direction of the medical school's dean. In his memory, UCLA also named a 6,400 sq ft (590 m^{2}) multipurpose space in Geffen Hall, the school's medical education building, the Garry Shandling Learning Studio.

== Awards and nominations ==
During his four-decade career, Shandling was nominated for 19 Primetime Emmy Awards and two Golden Globe Awards.

Additionally, Shandling won two British Comedy Awards, 12 CableACE Awards (including 8 for The Larry Sanders Show and 4 for It's Garry Shandling's Show), a BAFTA Award and was nominated for 2 Writers Guild of America Awards for The Larry Sanders Show. He received three American Comedy Awards, two Satellite Award nominations, and in 2004, he was presented with the Austin Film Festival's Outstanding Television Writer Award.

== Filmography ==
Year	Title	Role	Notes
1990	Mother Goose Rock 'n' Rhyme	Jack	
1993	The Night We Never Met	Mr. Vertisey	Uncredited
1994	Love Affair	Kip DeMay	
1994	Mixed Nuts	Stanley	
1998	Dr. Dolittle	Male Pigeon (voice)	
1998	Hurlyburly	Artie	
2000	What Planet Are You From?	Harold Anderson	Also producer, writer
2001	Town & Country	Griffin Morris	
2001	Zoolander	Himself	Cameo
2002	Run Ronnie Run!	Himself	Cameo
2002	The Rutles 2: Can't Buy Me Lunch	Himself	
2005	Trust the Man	Dr. Beekman	
2006	Over the Hedge	Verne (voice)	
2006	Hammy's Boomerang Adventure	Verne (voice)	Short
2010	Iron Man 2	Senator Stern	
2011	The Brain Storm	Garry Shandling	Short
2012	The Dictator	Health Inspector	Uncredited cameo
2014	Captain America: The Winter Soldier	Senator Stern	
2016	The Jungle Book	Ikki (voice)	Posthumous release (final film role), dedicated in memory
2016	Dying Laughing	Himself	Posthumous release (final film appearance)
2018	The Zen Diaries of Garry Shandling	Himself	Posthumous release (documentary)

=== Television ===
Year	Title	Role	Notes
1979	Make Me Laugh	Himself	Comedy game show
1984	Garry Shandling: Alone in Vegas	Himself	Stand-up special
1985	Michael Nesmith in Television Parts	Himself	Skits in 2 episodes
1986	The Garry Shandling Show: 25th Anniversary Special	Garry Shandling	Parody of a The Tonight Show Starring Johnny Carson-type anniversary
1986–1987	The Tonight Show Starring Johnny Carson	Himself (guest host)	7 episodes; June and October 1986, January and September 1987
1986–1990	It's Garry Shandling's Show	Garry Shandling	72 episodes; also co-creator, executive producer, writer
1987	Saturday Night Live	Himself (host)	Episode: "Garry Shandling/Los Lobos"
1990	32nd Annual Grammy Awards	Himself (host)	Television special
1991	33rd Annual Grammy Awards	Himself (host)	Television special
1991	Garry Shandling: Stand-Up	Himself	Stand-up special
1992	The Ben Stiller Show	Garry Shandling	Episode: "With Garry Shandling"
1992–1998	The Larry Sanders Show	Larry Sanders	89 episodes; also co-creator, executive producer, writer, director
1993	35th Annual Grammy Awards	Himself (host)	Television special
1994	36th Annual Grammy Awards	Himself (host)	Television special
1996	Dr. Katz, Professional Therapist	Garry (voice)	Episode: "Sticky Notes"
1998	Caroline in the City	Steve	Episode: "Caroline and the Marriage Counselor: Part 2"
2000	The X-Files	Himself	Episode: "Hollywood A.D."
2000	52nd Primetime Emmy Awards	Himself (host)	Television special
2002	My Adventures in Television	Himself	Episode: "Death Be Not Pre-Empted"
2004	56th Primetime Emmy Awards	Himself (host)	Television special
2006	Tom Goes to the Mayor	Captain Pat Lewellen (voice)	Episode: "Couple's Therapy"
2007–2009	Real Time with Bill Maher	Himself	4 episodes; 101 (2007), 129, 135 (both 2008), and 172 (2009)
2016	Comedians in Cars Getting Coffee	Himself	Episode: "It's Great That Garry Shandling Is Still Alive"

=== As writer ===
Year	Title	Notes
1975–1976	Sanford and Son	4 episodes
1976	Welcome Back, Kotter	Episode: "Horshack vs. Carvelli"
1978	The Harvey Korman Show	Episode: "The One Where Harvey Won't Change"

== Books ==
- Confessions of a Late-Night Talk-show Host: The Autobiography of Larry Sanders was written in-character as Larry Sanders by Shandling with David Rensin. It was released on October 4, 1999, and was the topic of season five's episode "The Book".
- Apatow, Judd, ed. (2019). It's Garry Shandling's Book. New York: Random House. ISBN 978-0-5255-1084-0.
