= Summertime Switch =

- Genre: Comedy
- Written by: Patrick J. Clifton
- Directed by: Alan Metter
- Starring: Rider Strong; Jason Weaver; Richard Moll; Teresa Ganzel; Soleil Moon Frye; Barry Williams; Casey Sander
- Country of origin: United States
- Original language: English

Production
- Executive producer: Louis Rudolph
- Producer: S. Bryan Hickox
- Cinematography: Vincent Baldino
- Editor: Sharyn L. Ross
- Running time: 90 minutes
- Production companies: Louis Rudolph Family Films, Inc. Victor Television Productions, Inc.

Original release
- Network: ABC
- Release: October 7, 1994

Summertime Switch is a 1994 made-for-TV comedy film. It was directed by Alan Metter and starred Rider Strong and Jason Weaver.

== Plot ==
Two boys with the same last name—a street-smart delinquent and a spoiled rich kid—get mixed up at a bus terminal and end up in each other's summer programs.

== Cast ==
- Rider Strong as Frederick Egan III
- Jason Weaver as Fast Freddie Egan
- Richard Moll as Jimmy
- Teresa Ganzel as Victoria Sykes
- Soleil Moon Frye as Peggy Kennedy
- Barry Williams as Frederick Egan, Jr.
- Casey Sander as Sgt. William Waldren
- Nicole Leach as Christine Olsen
- John Steven Jones as Hacksaw
- Isaac Lidsky as Numbers
- Patrick Renna as Modem
- David Tom as Todd
- Tighe Swanson as Ferret

== Reception ==
Dove.org gave the film a negative rating of 7.
