= The Harvey Korman Show =

American sitcom television series

- Created by: Hal Dresner
- Written by: Mike Kagan; Harry Cauley; Carol Gary; Hal Dresner; Jim Parker; Burt Prelutsky; Garry Shandling
- Directed by: Harvey Korman; Howard Morris; Bill Persky; Alan Myerson; Jeff Bleckner
- Starring: Harvey Korman; Christine Lahti; Barry Van Dyke; Milton Selzer
- Theme music composer: Peter Matz
- Opening theme: "Living Life Today" by Harvey Korman
- Country of origin: United States
- Original language: English
- No. of seasons: 1
- No. of episodes: 6

Production
- Executive producer: Hal Dresner
- Producer: Don Van Atta
- Production locations: NBC Studios; Burbank, California
- Running time: 30 minutes
- Production company: Chrisma Productions

Original release
- Network: ABC
- Release: January 31 – August 3, 1978

The Harvey Korman Show is an American sitcom television series starring Harvey Korman, Christine Lahti, Barry Van Dyke and Milton Selzer that aired for five episodes on ABC from January 31 to August 3, 1978.

== Synopsis ==
Harvey A. Kavanaugh is an egotistical, self-centered, out-of-work actor who operates an acting class from his home (Harvey A. Kavanaugh Academy of Dramatic Arts) that he shares with his level-headed daughter Maggie, who works at the Friendly Community Bank.

== Cast ==
- Harvey Korman as Harvey A. Kavanaugh
- Christine Lahti as Maggie Kavanaugh
- Barry Van Dyke as Stuart Stafford
- Milton Selzer as Jake Winkleman

== Production ==
The Harvey Korman Show was created as a star vehicle for Harvey Korman when he was offered a contract by ABC to headline his own television series. Following his successful run as a supporting player on CBS's The Carol Burnett Show from 1967 to 1977, Korman by this time had grown restless of the variety-show routine and was keen to pursue lead-character roles.

The pilot episode was originally broadcast on May 19, 1977 and varied slightly from the 1978 series: Korman portrays Francis A. Kavanaugh, a flamboyant, old-school actor and dramatic coach of an acting class he operates from the home he shares with his 19-year-old daughter Maggie (played by Susan Lawrence in the pilot). In the actual series, Korman's character name was changed to Harvey A. Kavanaugh and the role of Maggie was recast with Christine Lahti in one of her early acting roles. The supporting cast includes Barry Van Dyke as Stuart Stafford, Maggie's boyfriend and co-worker (whom Harvey dislikes), and Milton Selzer as Jake Winkleman, Harvey's hard-working agent.

The Harvey Korman Show was broadcast Tuesday nights on ABC at 9:30 p.m. throughout its brief run. It was videotaped before a live audience at NBC Studios in Burbank, California. The theme song "Living Life Today", written by Ken Welch & Mitzi Welch, was performed by Korman in a Broadway-esque manner. Garry Shandling was one of the scriptwriters and story editor for the series.

== Episodes ==
No.	Title	Directed by	Written by	Original release date
1	"Pilot"	Alan Myerson	Hal Dresner	May 19, 1977
An egocentric actor asks his agent to find him an acting role so he can raise $1,000 to buy a used car for his daughter Maggie.
2	"The One Where Harvey Gets a Job as an Escort"	Alan Myerson	Harry Cauley, Mike Kagan	January 31, 1978
Harvey answers an advertisement for a leading man but ends up landing a job with an escort service.
3	"The One Where Stuart Moves In"	Unknown	Carol Gary	April 4, 1978
Harvey returns home early from an out-of-town acting job and is surprised to discover that Stuart and Maggie are living together in his house.
4	"The One Where Harvey Won't Change"	Alan Myerson	Garry Shandling, Hal Dresner	April 11, 1978
When Harvey refuses to learn how to drive a car, Maggie, Stuart, and his acting students conspire to teach him, but he ends up in court.
5	"The One Where There's a Hold-Up"	Jeff Bleckner	Jim Parker	April 18, 1978
Harvey becomes a hero when he helps foil a bank robbery attempt – by co-signing a bank loan for the bumbling hold-up man.
6	"The One Where Harvey Goes on a Kids Show"	Unknown	Burt Prelutsky	August 3, 1978
Harvey's bragging about his success as an actor leads him into a cameo appearance on a TV show for kids – as a carrot.

== Reception ==
The Harvey Korman Show drew low ratings and was cancelled after only five episodes aired. Korman himself expressed disappointment with the series and blamed its failure on the writing which he said "wasn't up to snuff" and also added that he was not happy with the casting either.
