= Laura Swisher =

American comedian (active 2002– )

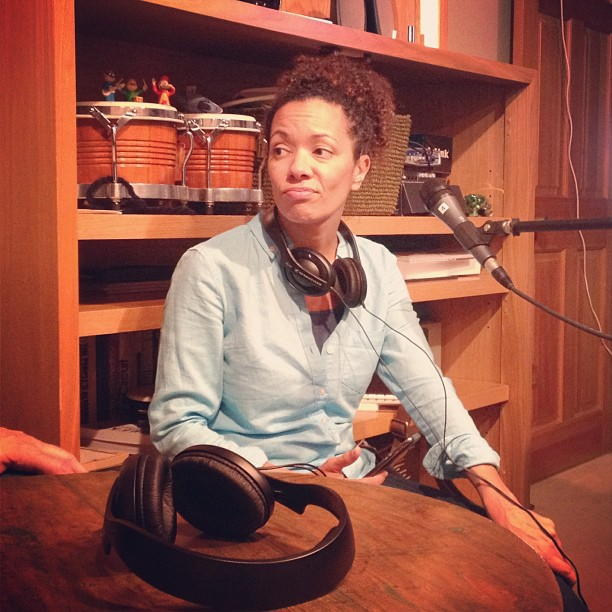
- Swisher on Our Place Out Loud by Louise Palanker in 2013
- Occupation: Stand-up comedian
- Years active: 2002–present
- Website: www.lauraswisher.com

Laura Swisher is a stand-up comedian based in Los Angeles, California, best known for her role as co-host of the former TechTV program Unscrewed with Martin Sargent from 2003 to 2004.

== Career ==
Swisher acted as the comedic sidekick to Martin Sargent on Unscrewed with Martin Sargent, which aired late-nights on TechTV from May 26, 2003, until its cancellation on November 11, 2004. The show was cancelled less than six months after G4 took over TechTV and eliminated much of that channel's programming.

Before moving to San Francisco and joining TechTV, Swisher worked in Los Angeles as a stand-up comedian. She earned TV appearances on Comedy Central's Premium Blend, as well as the first season of NBC's Last Comic Standing in 2003, in which she was a semi-finalist. In addition to her stand-up work, she appeared as a contestant on the Game Show Network program Russian Roulette in 2002.

Swisher also appeared in the music video "Strange New Element" by the band Low Water. Near the end of the video, she makes an appearance with fellow TechTV personalities, including Cat Schwartz, Morgan Webb, Sarah Lane, Chi-Lan Lieu and Sumi Das.

For two years, from 2005 to 2007, Swisher co-hosted a podcast with comedian Louise Palanker titled Weezy and the Swish, but that show ended in July 2007 due to Laura's increasing lack of involvement in the show after moving to San Francisco. In 2011, she relocated back to Los Angeles.

Swisher has also co-hosted Dailies on ReelzChannel, and has hosted a number of daily and weekly programs for TV.com.

Since 2016, she has been senior producer at Maximum Fun, the radio and podcast production house.
