= The Winds of Whoopee =

- Title screen
- Also known as: Steve Martin's The Winds of Whoopee
- Genre: Comedy
- Written by: Steve Martin
- Directed by: Alan Metter
- Starring: Steve Martin; David Brenner; Bill Cosby; Antonio Fargas; Ron Leibman; Meredith MacRae; Strother Martin; Ed McMahon; Gary Mule Deer; Gilda Radner; Burt Reynolds; Doc Severinsen
- Country of origin: United States
- Original language: English

Production
- Executive producers: Steve Martin; Ken Suddleston
- Producer: Alan Metter
- Running time: 60 minutes

Original release
- Network: NBC
- Release: February 6, 1983

Related
- Steve Martin's Best Show Ever (1981)

Steve Martin's The Winds of Whoopee (a.k.a. simply The Winds of Whoopee) is a 1983 American comedy television special on NBC, produced and written by Steve Martin. The title was a take-off of The Winds of War, which premiered as a TV miniseries on the same night on ABC. In a 30-second spot, Orson Welles says: "Why spend 18 hours watching someone else's war, when you know how it comes out? We win, and then have to buy all their cars. Watch Steve Martin's The Winds of Whoopee. See it all in one hour on Sunday."

The show is a combination of old and new material compiled from past Martin specials and his appearances on Saturday Night Live and The Tonight Show.
