= Alan Metter =

American film director (1942–2020)

- Born: December 19, 1942; Sharon, Massachusetts, U.S.
- Died: June 7, 2020 (aged 77); Fort Lauderdale, Florida, U.S.
- Occupations: Film director, television director, music video director
- Years active: 1978–2000

Alan Dennis Metter (December 19, 1942 – June 7, 2020) was an American film director whose most notable credits include Back to School starring Rodney Dangerfield, and Girls Just Want to Have Fun with Sarah Jessica Parker. He also produced and directed the 1983 television special The Winds of Whoopee for Steve Martin. In 1988, he was set to direct Atuk, based on the Mordecai Richler novel The Incomparable Atuk, with Sam Kinison as the title character. The production was shut down early into filming.

== Selected filmography ==
- The Winds of Whoopee (1983) (TV)
- Girls Just Want to Have Fun (1985)
- Back to School (1986)
- Moving (1988)
- Cold Dog Soup (1990)
- Working Tra$h (1990) (TV)
- Police Academy: Mission to Moscow (1994)
- Summertime Switch (1994) (TV)
- Billboard Dad (1998)
- The Jersey (1999) (TV)
- Passport to Paris (1999)
- The Growing Pains Movie (2000) (TV)
