= Corey Cerovsek =

Canadian musician and mathematician

- Born: 24 April 1972 (age 54); Vancouver, British Columbia, Canada
- Instrument: violin
- Years active: 1981–present
- Labels: Delos, Aguava, Black Box Classics, Claves, Milanollo
- Website: www.cerovsek.com

Corey Cerovsek (born 24 April 1972) is a Canadian violinist, pianist, and mathematician. At age 12, he was the youngest student to receive a gold medal from the Royal Conservatory of Music. In 1992, Cerovsek was the recipient of the Virginia-Parker Prize from the Canada Council for the Arts. In 2006, Cerovsek with Steven Heyman were nominated for a Grammy in the category Best Chamber Music Performance. In 2008, Cerovsek received the MIDEM Classical Music Award for the Best Chamber Music for his recording with Paavali Jumppanen of the complete violin sonatas by Beethoven.

== Biography ==
Cerovsek was born in Vancouver, British Columbia, Canada, the son of Austrian parents Sophia and Helmut Cerovsek who emigrated to Canada. His sister, Katja Cerovsek, is a pianist and a lawyer. He began learning to play the violin at age five. He studied with John Loban, Charmian Gadd, Richard Goldner, and Josef Gingold. In 1984 he began studying music at Indiana University in Bloomington. He was awarded a bachelor's degree in music and mathematics in 1987 (age 15), a master's degree in music in 1988, a master's degree in mathematics in 1990, and completed his doctoral coursework in music and mathematics in 1991 (age 18).

In 1981, Cerovsek had his debut with the Calgary Philharmonic Orchestra. He has played with major orchestras and in recital throughout the world. He records on the "Milanollo" Stradivarius violin, an instrument played, among others, by Christian Ferras, Giovanni Battista Viotti, and Nicolò Paganini.

== Discography ==
- 1987: with Katja Cerovsek, recorded works by Vitali, Hubay, Sarasate, Kreisler and several others on RCI 648
- 1998: with Katja Cerovsek, Corey Cerovsek Plays Wieniawski DE 3231
- 1999: with the Moscow Chamber Orchestra, Mozart Adagios, DE 3243
- 1999: with the Moscow Chamber Orchestra, Russian Soul, DE 3244
- 2006: with Paavali Jumppanen, complete violin sonatas by Beethoven, Claves CLV 50-2610/12
- 2006: Corigliano: Violin Sonata; Etude Fantasy; Fantasia on an Ostinato; Chiaroscuro
- 2008: with the Orchestre de Chambre de Lausanne, concertos by Vieuxtemps and Wienawski, Claves CLV CLV 50-2801
