= Rufus Hussey =

American marksman (1919–1994)

Rufus Taft Hussey (March 12, 1919 – February 24, 1994) was an American marksman. He grew up in Randolph County, North Carolina. He was known as an expert marksman with a slingshot (also referred to as a beanshooter). In 1952, Hussey began selling and giving away beanshooters to preserve the dying art of the beanshooter. His beanshooters were sequentially numbered by a serial number.

Hussey was well known in his home county and saw his big break on the national scene when he was invited to appear on The Tonight Show Starring Johnny Carson. Hussey appeared on the episode that aired on January 23, 1986. Hussey was on the air for almost 10 minutes with Carson, where he talked about beanshooters, displayed his considerable skill, and shot an object out of Carson's hand.

Hussey was also featured in the CBS Saturday Morning news segment "In the News" that aired in the Fall of 1986. This short segment showcased Hussey, his brother, and their homemade "beanshooters."

Hussey has been called a "Slingshot Expert" and "the World's Most Accurate Slingshot Assassin."
