= Louise Palanker =

American television producer

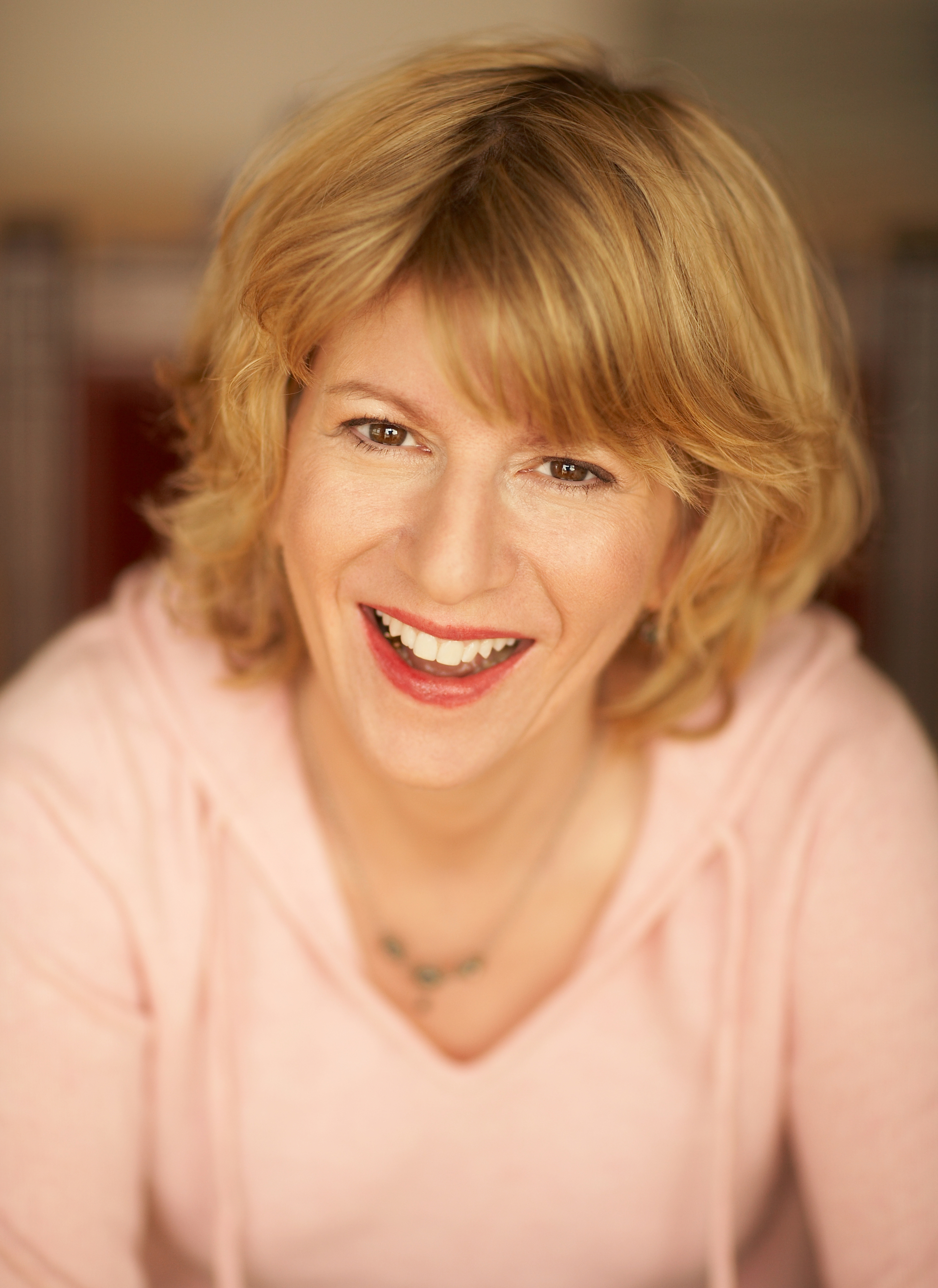
- Palanker in 2007
- Born: Louise Palanker; Buffalo, New York, United States
- Citizenship: United States
- Occupations: Media executive, podcast host, author, filmmaker, comedian
- Known for: Co-founding Premiere Networks; Media Path Podcast; documentary filmmaking
- Notable work: Journals: Middle School Love and War; Family Band: The Cowsills Story

Louise Palanker is a co-founder of Premiere Networks, now a division of iHeartMedia. She currently co-hosts Media Path Podcast with Fritz Coleman.

Palanker authored the semi-autobiographical coming-of-age story Journals: Middle School Love and War, which she developed into a podcast that was called Journals: Out Loud. Palanker founded an advice app for teens, originally called Journals and now called Ask Weezy.

Palanker produced and directed the documentary films: Family Band: The Cowsills Story (airing on Showtime in 2013–2014, now available on Amazon Prime), We Played Marbles: Remembering a Stolen Childhood (2007), about the lives of Holocaust survivors, and the short documentary, Margaret Singer: Seeking Light, which was selected by the Santa Barbara International Film Festival in 2020.

In 1999, she began a stand-up comedy program, Kid's Comedy Club, at two Los Angeles Boys and Girls Clubs and at the Santa Barbara Jewish Federation, where kids learn to write and perform their own stand-up comedy.

In March 2005, Palanker testified in the trial of Michael Jackson as a witness for the prosecution. The prosecution called Palanker to testify about a call she received from the accuser's mother, and to rebut defense suggestions that the family tried to dupe celebrities, including Palanker, George Lopez and Jay Leno, into giving them money. The trial ended in Jackson's acquittal on all charges.

Palanker grew up in Buffalo, New York. She lives in Los Angeles and Santa Barbara, California, with her husband.
