= Fritz Coleman =

American journalist

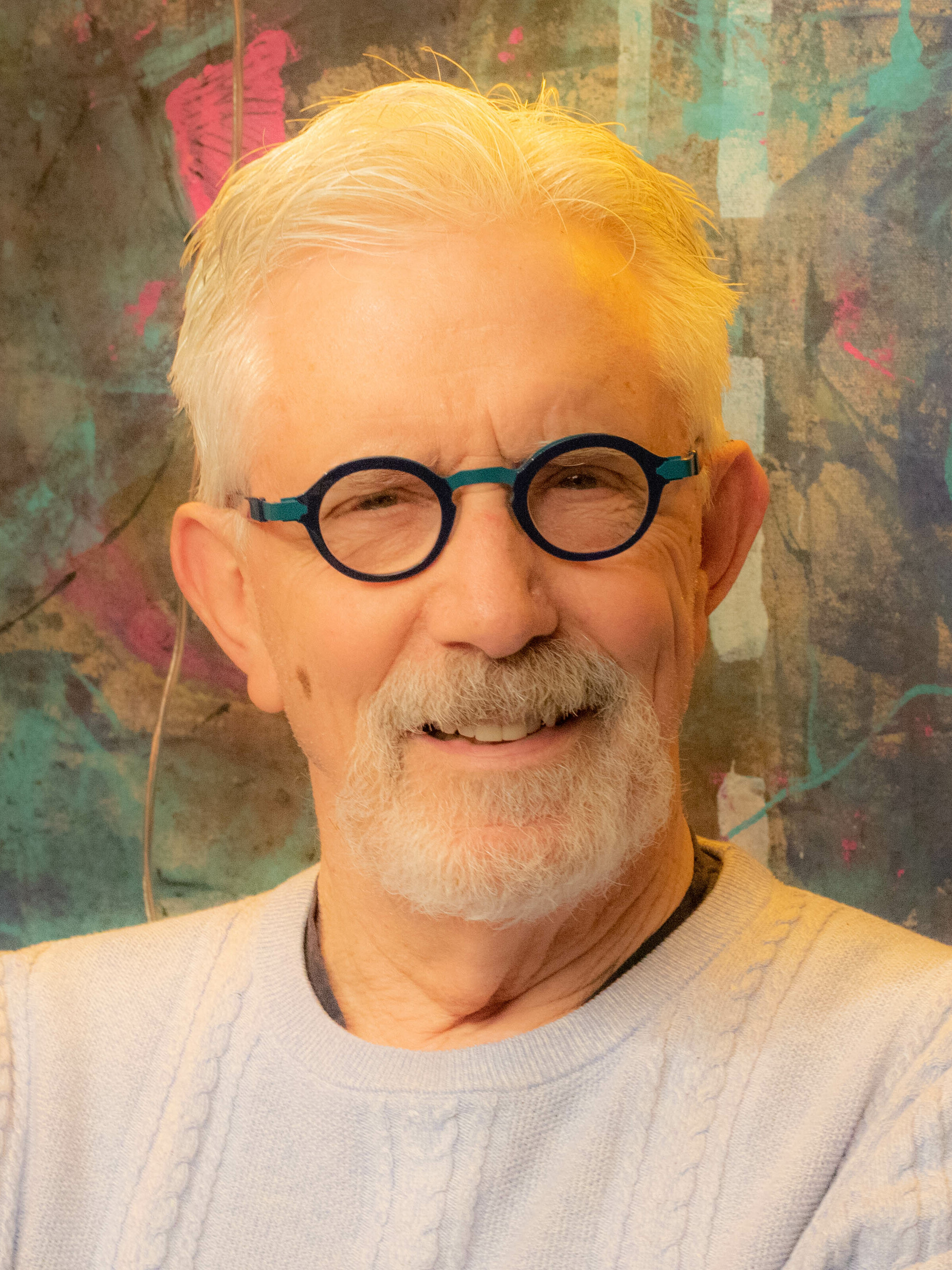
- Coleman in 2022
- Born: May 27, 1948 (age 78); Philadelphia, Pennsylvania, U.S.
- Education: Salem College; Temple University
- Occupation: Weathercaster
- Children: 2 sons and 1 daughter
- Website: www.fritzcolemancomedy.com

Fritz Coleman (born May 27, 1948) is a retired weathercaster, who worked for NBC Channel 4 (KNBC) in Los Angeles, California from 1983 until 2020. He began hosting Media Path Podcast with Louise Palanker in 2020.

== Early life and education ==
Coleman and was born in Philadelphia and grew up in Radnor, Pennsylvania. He attended Salem University in Salem, West Virginia and Temple University in Philadelphia, where he studied radio, television and film.

== Career ==
Coleman worked as a comedian and disc jockey for several years and as radio personality Jay Fredericks at WBEN and later WKBW in Buffalo, New York. In 1980, he left Buffalo for Los Angeles to work as a stand-up comic. In February of 1983, he began work as weekend weatherman at KNBC and became the weekday weatherman in June of 1985. He also hosted or appeared on a number of other KNBC shows, including It’s Fritz from 1988 to 1990 and What a Week from 1990 to 1991.

He has written and performed two one-man theater acts, titled The Reception and It's Me! Dad! He received the 2004 EMA Community Service Award for his involvement with KNBC's 4 Our Planet, a children's program. He appeared in a supporting role in one of Raymond Burr's last Perry Mason television films, The Case of the Telltale Talk Show Host in 1993.

He received a credit on the film Wake Up, Ron Burgundy: The Lost Movie, an alternate film companion to Anchorman: The Legend of Ron Burgundy.

From 2009 to 2011, Coleman also did the weekday weather for KNBC in Los Angeles and KNSD in San Diego.

In June 2020, Coleman announced that he would retire after almost 40 years at KNBC.
