= Teresa Ganzel =

American actress (born 1957)

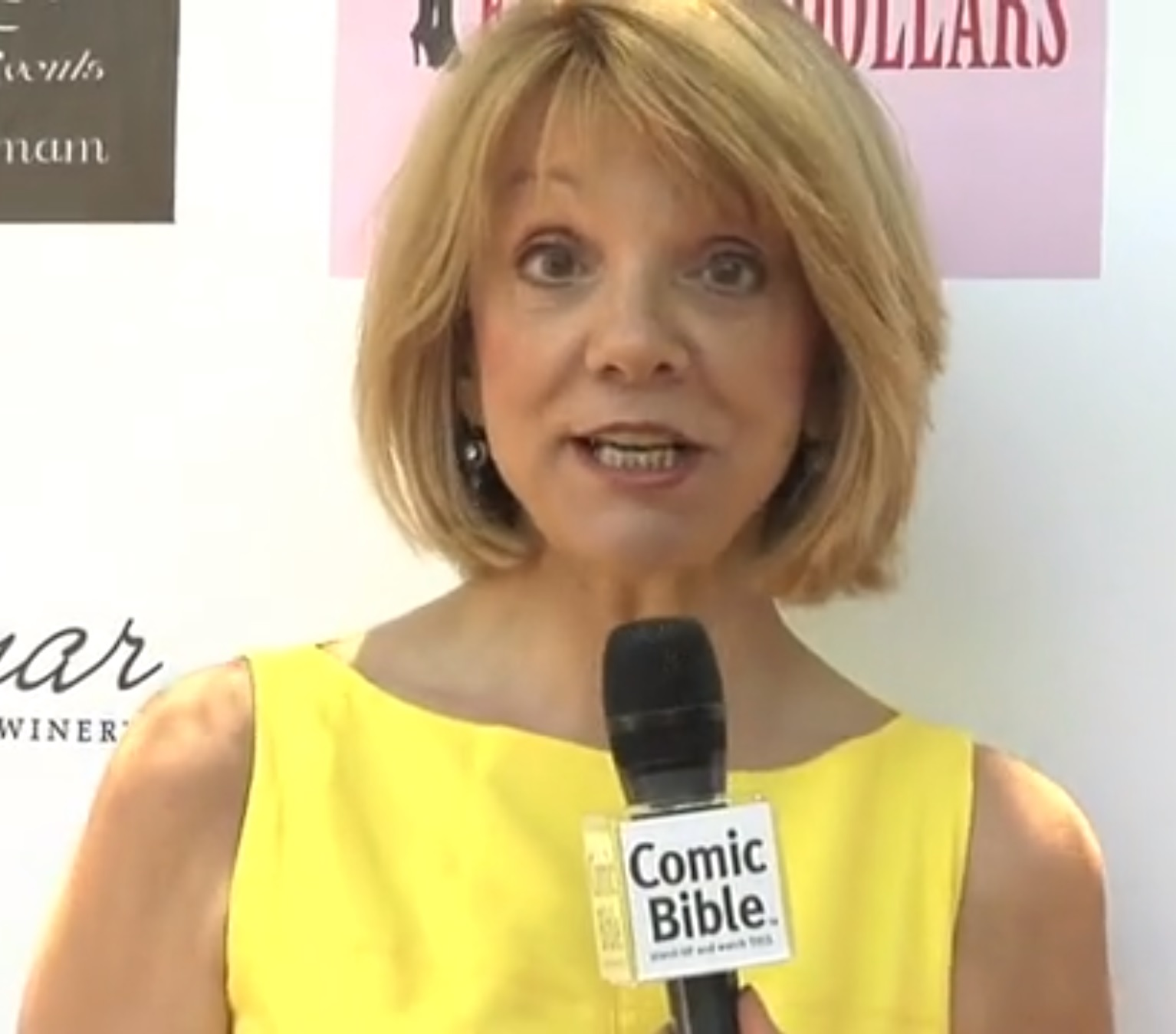
- Ganzel in 2012
- Born: March 23, 1957 (age 69); Toledo, Ohio, U.S.
- Occupations: Actress; comedian
- Years active: 1981–present
- Agent(s): Arlene Thornton and Associates
- Spouse: Billy Van Zandt (m. 2021)

Teresa Ganzel (born March 23, 1957 in Toledo, Ohio) is an American actress and comedian.

== Career ==
Ganzel was a recurring cast member in skits on The Tonight Show Starring Johnny Carson, where her roles included the Tea Time Lady in the "Tea Time Movie" sketches.

In 1984, Ganzel played Sheree Winkler, in the short-lived sitcom The Duck Factory.

In 2010, Ganzel played a principal role in the off-Broadway production of Viagara Falls (2010) after appearing in the same role, Jacqueline Tempest, in productions of the play staged in other cities.

== Reputation ==
TV writer Mark Evanier said:

"[Ganzel] took the Matinee Lady from being someone to be ogled and laughed-at because her I.Q. was lower than her bra-size to being a skilled comic actress playing that kind of character...This all may wind up to a tiny milestone in the evolution of women on TV but I think it's quite real and that Teresa deserves some real credit."

== Personal life ==
Ganzel had dated her Tom and Jerry Kids and Droopy, Master Detective co-star Frank Welker.

She is married to Billy Van Zandt, and they live in Los Angeles.

== Selected roles ==
- Three's Company (1981) (TV Series) ... Greedy Gretchen
- My Favorite Year (1982) ... Dumpling
- Teachers Only (1982) ... Sam
- The Toy (1982) ... Fancy Bates
- The Tonight Show Starring Johnny Carson ... Tea Time Movie Lady (1982–1991)
- National Lampoon's Movie Madness (1982) ... Diana
- The Duck Factory (1984) (TV series) ... Mrs. Sheree Winkler
- Three's a Crowd (1985) (TV series) ... Greedy Gretchen
- Transylvania 6-5000 (1985)... Elizabeth Ellison
- Newhart (1986) (TV series) ... Kathy Newman (episode: "Torn Between Three Brothers")
- Fresno (1986) (TV miniseries) ... Bobbi Jo Bobb
- Hardcastle and McCormick (1986) (TV series) ...Loni Summers
- Roxie (1987) (TV series) ... Marcie McKinley
- Top Cat and the Beverly Hills Cats (1987) (animated TV movie) ... Kitty Glitter
- The New Yogi Bear Show (1988) ... Additional voices
- Mama's Family (1989) ... Heather
- Married... with Children (1989) ... Heather (episode: "A Three Job, No Income Family")
- The Smurfs (1989) ... Additional voices
- The Dave Thomas Comedy Show (1990) ... Regular
- Columbo (1990) ... Dede Perkins (episode: "Rest in Peace, Mrs. Columbo")
- Monsters (American TV series) (1990)... Debbie (episode: "Murray's Monster")
- Tom & Jerry Kids (1990–93) ... Miss Vavoom and others
- Raw Toonage (1992) ... Additional voices
- Droopy, Master Detective (1993–94) ... Miss Vavoom
- Summertime Switch (1994) (TV) ... Victoria Sykes
- Mike Hammer, Private Eye (1998) ... Livia Sterling Randolph (episode: "A New Leaf: Part 2")
- I Am Weasel (1998) ... Loullabelle
- Rugrats (1998) ... Colleen McNulty (episode: "A Very McNulty Birthday")
- The New Woody Woodpecker Show (2000) ... Inga Smorgasbord (episode: "Frankenwoody")
- Monsters, Inc. (2001) ... Betty (voice)
- Clifford's Really Big Movie (2004) ... Liz
- EverQuest II (2004 computer game) ... 13 voice roles
- The Emperor's New School (2006) ... Princess Lalala
- Surf's Up (2007) ... Female Penguin #2s
- Horton Hears a Who! (2008) ... Female Who #2
- WALL-E (2008) ... Additional voices
- Up (2009) ... Additional voices
- Random! Cartoons (2009) ... Lulu
- Toy Story 3 (2010) ... Additional voices
- Monsters University (2013) ... Gladys
- Inside Out (2015) ... Additional voices
- Despicable Me 3 (2017) ... Additional voices
- Side Hustle (2022) (TV series) ... Gladys (episode: "We Have a Bingo!")
