= Harvey Korman =

American actor and comedian (1927–2008)

- Korman in 1969
- Born: Harvey Herschel Korman; February 15, 1927; Chicago, Illinois, U.S.
- Died: May 29, 2008 (aged 81); UCLA Medical Center, Los Angeles, California, U.S.
- Resting place: Woodlawn Memorial Cemetery in Santa Monica, California
- Occupations: Actor; comedian
- Years active: 1950–2008
- Spouses: Donna Ehlert (m. 1960; div. 1977) Deborah Fritz (m. 1982)
- Children: 4

Harvey Herschel Korman (February 15, 1927 – May 29, 2008) was an American actor and comedian who performed in television and film productions. He is most notable as a main cast member alongside Carol Burnett, Tim Conway and Vicki Lawrence on the CBS sketch comedy series The Carol Burnett Show (1967–1977) for which he won four Primetime Emmy Awards and a Golden Globe Award.

His early roles were on The Danny Kaye Show and The Lucy Show. Korman briefly starred in his own sitcom The Harvey Korman Show (1978) and continued to work with his The Carol Burnett Show cast mates in projects such as The Tim Conway Show (1980), and Mama's Family (1983–1984). He starred in several comedy films by Mel Brooks including Blazing Saddles (1974), High Anxiety (1977), History of the World, Part I (1981) and Dracula: Dead and Loving It (1995). His other notable films include Herbie Goes Bananas (1980), Trail of the Pink Panther (1982), and Curse of the Pink Panther (1983).

Korman is known for his voice work, taking on roles such as The Great Gazoo in The Flintstones (1965–1966). He is also known for voice roles in Garfield and Friends, Alice in Wonderland, Dumb and Dumber, Hey Arnold!, The Wild Thornberrys, and Buzz Lightyear of Star Command.

== Early life and education ==
Korman was born February 15, 1927 in Chicago, of Russian Jewish descent, the son of Ellen (née Blecher) and Cyril Raymond Korman, a salesman. He served in the United States Navy during World War II. After being discharged, he studied at the Goodman School of Drama at the Art Institute of Chicago (now at DePaul University) and at HB Studio. He was a member of the Peninsula Players summer theatre program during the 1950, 1957, and 1958 seasons.

== Career ==
=== 1959–1966: Early years ===
Korman's first television role was as a head waiter in "Decisions, Decisions, Decisions", an episode of The Donna Reed Show. He appeared as a comically exasperated public relations man in a January 1961 episode of the CBS drama Route 66. He was seen on numerous television programs afterwards including the role of Blake in the 1964 episode "Who Chopped Down the Cherry Tree?" on the NBC medical drama The Eleventh Hour and a bartender in the 1962 Perry Mason episode, "The Case of the Unsuitable Uncle". He frequently appeared as a supporting player in The Danny Kaye Show from 1963 through 1967. He was cast three times, including the role of Dr. Allison in "Who Needs Glasses?" (1962), in ABC's The Donna Reed Show. He also guest-starred in Dennis the Menace and in the NBC contemporary western series Empire.

From 1964 to 1966, he appeared three times in consecutive years in the CBS comedy The Munsters starring Fred Gwynne and Yvonne De Carlo. During the 1965–1966 season, Korman appeared regularly on ABC's The Flintstones, for 12 episodes, as the voice of The Great Gazoo in its final season on network television.

=== 1967–1977: The Carol Burnett Show ===
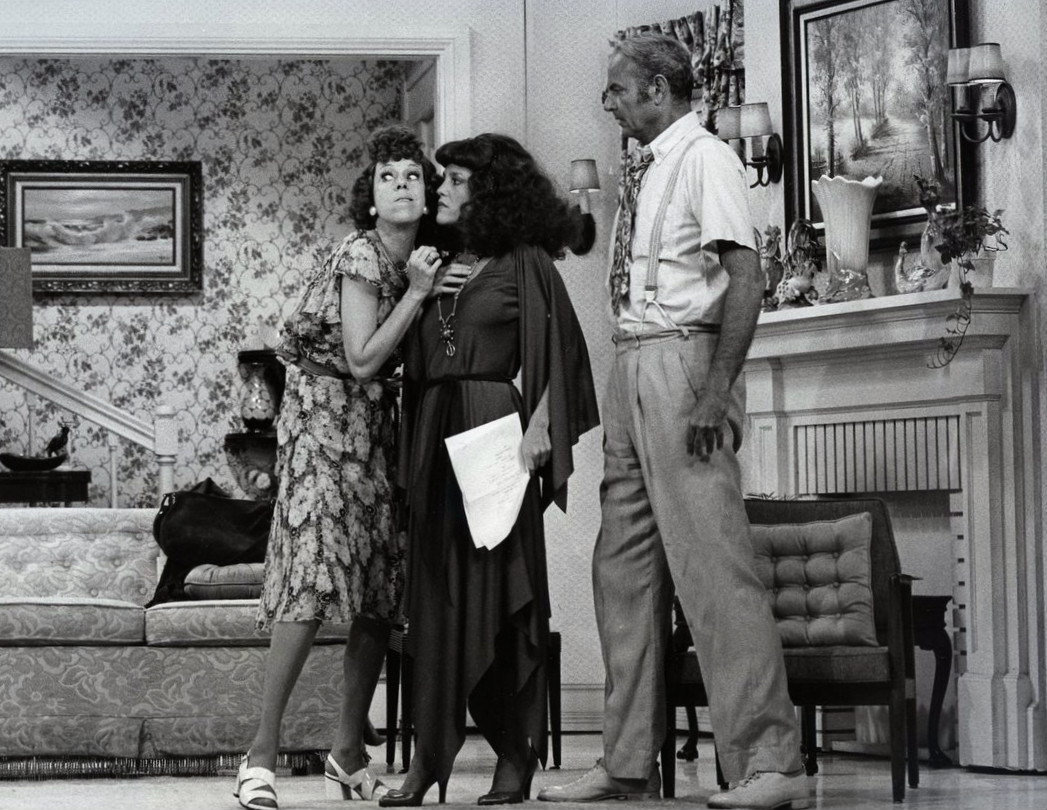
Carol Burnett, guest star Madeline Kahn, and Harvey Korman in one of a series of "The Family" sketches in The Carol Burnett Show, 1976

The 1967 debut of The Carol Burnett Show gave Korman his greatest recognition. Korman starred alongside Carol Burnett, Vicki Lawrence, and Tim Conway. During his ten-year run on the show, he received six Primetime Emmy Award nominations and won four, in 1969, 1971, 1972, and 1974. The exact name of the category changed slightly during the period, but the award was for "Outstanding Achievement by a Supporting Performer in Music or Variety show". He was also nominated for four Golden Globes for the series, winning that award in 1975. In 1977, he left The Carol Burnett Show to headline his own sitcom on ABC, The Harvey Korman Show, which lasted five episodes.

While appearing on The Carol Burnett Show, Korman gained further fame by appearing as the villainous Hedley Lamarr in the 1974 Mel Brooks film Blazing Saddles starring Cleavon Little, Gene Wilder, and Madeline Kahn. Ron Pennington of The Hollywood Reporter praised his performance writing, "The performances are all comedy gems, with Korman especially delightful as Hedley Lamarr, scheming and plotting with all the finesse of a precocious brat". He also starred in Brooks' High Anxiety (1977) as Dr. Charles Montague.

=== 1978–2006 ===
In 1978, he appeared in the CBS Star Wars Holiday Special providing levity in three of the special's variety segments: a cantina skit with Bea Arthur in which he plays a barfly who drinks through a hole in the top of his head, another as Chef Gormaanda, a four-armed parody of Julia Child, and one as a malfunctioning Amorphian android in an instruction video. In 1980, he played Captain Blythe in the Disney comedy, Herbie Goes Bananas. The following year, he portrayed Count de Monet in Brooks' History of the World, Part I. In later years, he did voice work for the live-action film The Flintstones as well as for the animated The Secret of NIMH 2: Timmy to the Rescue. He also starred in the short-lived Mel Brooks TV series The Nutt House, and in his final Mel Brooks film, as the zany Dr. Seward, in Dracula: Dead and Loving It. In 1986, he starred in the failed CBS comedy series Leo & Liz in Beverly Hills with Valerie Perrine.

In 1982, he reunited with Carol Burnett and Vicki Lawrence in the TV movie Eunice reprising his role of Ed Higgins from “The Family” sketches from The Carol Burnett Show. He continued the portrayal on the spin-off series, Mama's Family in addition to introducing each episode of the series during its initial two-season NBC network run, portraying fictional television host Alistair Quince as well as directing 31 episodes of the series.

He also reunited with fellow Carol Burnett Show alumnus Tim Conway, making a guest appearance on Conway's 1980–1981 comedy-variety series The Tim Conway Show. The two later toured the U.S., reprising skits from the show and performing new material. A DVD of new comedy sketches by Korman and Conway, Together Again, was released in 2006. Korman and Conway had been jointly inducted into the Television Hall of Fame in 2002.

== Personal life ==
=== Marriages ===
Korman was married to Donna Ehlert from 1960 to 1977 and they had two children, Maria and Christopher Korman. He married Deborah Korman (née Fritz) in 1982 and was married to her until he died in 2008. They had two daughters together, Kate and Laura Korman.

=== Death ===
Korman died at age 81 on May 29, 2008, at UCLA Medical Center as the result of complications from a ruptured abdominal aortic aneurysm he had suffered four months earlier. He is entombed in a crypt at Santa Monica's Woodlawn Cemetery within its Unity Corridor Mausoleum.

== Filmography ==
=== Film ===
Year	Project	Role	Notes
1959	Carving Magic	Al	Industrial short
1961	Living Venus	Ken Carter	
1962	Gypsy	Gypsy's press agent	
1966	Lord Love a Duck	Weldon Emmett	
1966	The Man Called Flintstone	Chief Boulder	voice
1968	Don't Just Stand There!	Merriman Dudley	
1969	The April Fools	Matt Benson	
1974	Blazing Saddles	Hedley Lamarr	
1974	Huckleberry Finn	The King	
1976	The Pink Panther Strikes Again	Prof. Auguste Balls	Scenes deleted but later retooled in Trail of the Pink Panther
1977	High Anxiety	Dr. Charles Montague	
1978	Bud and Lou	Bud Abbott	
1979	Americathon	Monty Rushmore	
1980	Herbie Goes Bananas	Captain Blythe	
1980	First Family	U.N. Ambassador Spender	
1981	History of the World, Part I	Count de Monet	
1982	Trail of the Pink Panther	Prof. Auguste Balls	Scenes incorporated from The Pink Panther Strikes Again
1983	Curse of the Pink Panther	Prof. Auguste Balls	
1984	Gone Are the Dayes	Charlie Mitchell	
1985	Alice in Wonderland	White King	
1986	The Longshot	Lou	
1987	Munchies	Cecil Watterman; Simon Watterman	
1994	The Flintstones	Dictabird	Voice
1994	Radioland Murders	Jules Cogley	
1995	Dracula: Dead and Loving It	Dr. Jack Seward	
1996	Jingle All the Way	President	
1998	The Secret of NIMH 2: Timmy to the Rescue	Floyd	Voice
1999	Baby Huey's Great Easter Adventure	Prof. von Klupp	Direct-to-video
2000	The Flintstones in Viva Rock Vegas	Col. Slaghoople	
2006	Together Again: Conway & Korman	Various	DVD release

=== Television ===
Year	Film	Role	Notes
1960	The Donna Reed Show	Head Waiter	Episode: "Decisions, Decisions, Decisions"
1961	Hennesey	Dr. Don Spright	Episode: "The Gossip Go-Round"
1961	The Red Skelton Hour	Artie	Episode: "Appleby's Office Party"
1961	Dennis the Menace	Realtor	Episode: "Haunted House"
1961–1963	Route 66	Len Statler	2 episodes
1962	Perry Mason	Bartender	Episode: "The Case of the Unsuitable Uncle"
1962	I'm Dickens, He's Fenster	Mr. Rembar	Episode: "The Acting Game"
1962	The Detectives Starring Robert Taylor	Gibson Holly	Episode: "The Jagged Edge"
1962	Empire	Bunce	Episode: "Pressure Lock"
1963	Dennis the Menace	Mr. Griffin	Episode: "My Four Boys"
1963	Sam Benedict	Reporter	Episode: "Of Rusted Cannons and Fallen Sparrows"
1963	Saints and Sinners	Jerry Grant	Episode: "The Year Joan Crawford Won the Oscar"
1963	Glynis	Ken Bradford	Episode: "Three Men in a Tub"
1964	The Munsters	Journalist Lennie Bates	Episode: "Family Portrait"
1964–1965	The Lucy Show	Various	3 episodes
1964	Hazel	Max Denton	Episode: "Maid for a Day"
1965	Gidget	Joe Hanley	Episode: "Daddy Come Home"
1965	The John Forsythe Show	H.H. Hopper	Episode: "Duty and the Beast"
1965	The Munsters	Dr. Leinbach	Episode: "Yes Galen, There Is a Herman"
1966	The Munsters	Professor Fagenspahen	Episode: "Prehistoric Munster"
1965–1966	The Flintstones	The Great Gazoo	Voice; 13 episodes
1966	Alice in Wonderland	Mad Hatter	Voice; Television movie
1966	F Troop	Col. Heindreich von Zeppel	Episode: "Bye, Bye, Balloon"
1967–1977	The Carol Burnett Show	Various roles	Main cast; 279 episodes
1968	The Wild Wild West	Baron Hinterstoisser	Episode: "The Night of the Big Blackmail"
1971	The Sonny & Cher Comedy Hour	Himself	Guest appearance
1976	The Muppet Show	Himself	Episode: Harvey Korman
1978	America 2-Night	Himself	Episode: Celebrity Night
1978	The Harvey Korman Show	Himself	Talk series
1978	Star Wars Holiday Special	Chef Gormaanda, Krelman, Toy Video Instructor	TV special
1980–1981	The Tim Conway Show	Himself	8 episodes
1982	Eunice	Ed	Television special
1983	The Invisible Woman	Carlisle Edwards	Television movie
1983	Carpool	Wendell Brooks	Television movie
1983–1984	Mama's Family	Eunice's husband / Various	26 episodes
1986	Leo & Liz in Beverly Hills	Leo Green	6 episodes
1989	Nutt House	Reginald Tarkington	10 episodes
1992	The Golden Palace	Bill	Episode: "Marriage on the Rocks with a Twist"
1994	Garfield and Friends	Professor Lamar	Voice; 2 episodes
1995	What a Cartoon!	O. Ratz	Voice; Episode: "Rat in a Hot Tin Can"
1995	Dumb and Dumber: The Animated Series	Officer Doohickey	Voice; 2 episodes
1996	Hey Arnold!	Don Reynolds	Voice; 2 episodes
1997	Diagnosis: Murder	Harvey Huckaby	Guest star; Episode: "Comedy Is Murder"
1999	The Wild Thornberrys	Earl	Voice; Episode: "No Laughing Matter"
1999	The Brothers Flub		Voice; 16 episodes
2000	Happily Ever After: Fairy Tales for Every Child	The Lion	Voice; Episode: "Aesop's Fables"
2000	Buzz Lightyear of Star Command	Gularis	Voice

Korman also appeared on multiple Carol Burnett reunion specials over the years.

=== Theatre ===
Year	Project	Role	Playwright	Notes
1950	The Tower Beyond Tragedy	The King's Guard	Robinson Jeffers	ANTA Playhouse, Broadway
1950	Captain Brassbound's Conversion	Ensemble	George Bernard Shaw	City Center, Broadway

=== Video games ===
- The Flintstones (1994) as the Dictabird (voice)
- The Flintstones: Bedrock Bowling (2000) as The Great Gazoo (voice)

== Awards and nominations ==
Year	Association	Category	Project	Result	Ref.
1969	Primetime Emmy Awards	Outstanding Individual Performance in a Variety or Music Program	The Carol Burnett Show	Won	
1971	Primetime Emmy Awards	Outstanding Individual Performance in a Variety or Music Program	The Carol Burnett Show	Won	
1972	Primetime Emmy Awards	Outstanding Individual Performance in a Variety or Music Program	The Carol Burnett Show	Won	
1973	Primetime Emmy Awards	Outstanding Individual Performance in a Variety or Music Program	The Carol Burnett Show	Nominated	
1974	Primetime Emmy Awards	Outstanding Individual Performance in a Variety or Music Program	The Carol Burnett Show	Won	
1976	Primetime Emmy Awards	Outstanding Individual Performance in a Variety or Music Program	The Carol Burnett Show	Nominated	
1977	Primetime Emmy Awards	Outstanding Individual Performance in a Variety or Music Program	The Carol Burnett Show	Nominated	
1972	Golden Globe Awards	Best Supporting Actor – Television	The Carol Burnett Show	Nominated	
1973	Golden Globe Awards	Best Supporting Actor – Television	The Carol Burnett Show	Nominated	
1974	Golden Globe Awards	Best Supporting Actor – Television	The Carol Burnett Show	Won	
1975	Golden Globe Awards	Best Supporting Actor – Television	The Carol Burnett Show	Nominated	
