= List of The Larry Sanders Show characters =

This is a list of The Larry Sanders Show characters. References below to a crew position are references to the occupation of these fictional characters on the show-within-a-show, which also is named The Larry Sanders Show.

== Show staff ==
=== Main characters ===
==== Larry Sanders ====
Lawrence "Larry" Sanders (all seasons) (born December 19, 1950, in Mound, Minnesota, and a graduate of the University of Minnesota), played by Garry Shandling, is the host of The Larry Sanders Show, a late-night talk show that has been on the air since 1987, airing at 11:30 PM, five days a week, on an unnamed network. He is 42 years old (as of the 1993 episode "The Breakdown (Part One)"), then 43 years old (as of the 1993 episode "Larry's Birthday"). His father is named Jerry and his brother is named Stan. His wives were Francine and Jeannie, from both of whom he is now divorced; he was briefly engaged to Roseanne Barr.

In the episode "The Garden Weasel", Larry shows his wife Jeannie a commercial that he did for Pan Am in 1979, in which he played a flight attendant. Also in the episode, Jeannie mentions that Larry once auditioned for the game show Make Me Laugh. In real life, Shandling appeared on the show as a celebrity guest.

In the episode "Larry's Partner", it is mentioned that Larry began his career as a standup comedian and as part of a double act with his friend Stan Paxton, played by Eric Bogosian. Larry and Stan recorded a comedy album together and had a bit called "The Man on the Street Meets the Man on the Moon". Larry broke up his act with Stan 15 years ago because Stan had a serious drinking problem and only joined the business to "get laid".

In the episode "The Promise", it is mentioned that Larry's first television appearance was on The Merv Griffin Show and that he later appeared on The Tonight Show Starring Johnny Carson.

Also in the episode, Larry mentions that he discovered comedian David Spade while he was performing at the Comedy Store and gave him his first television appearance on his show. Spade went on to appear on the show at least six more times. Larry feels betrayed by Spade when he learns that Spade had appeared on The Tonight Show recently, but he forgives him when he recalls that he did the same thing by appearing on The Tonight Show after The Merv Griffin Show.

In the episode "Out of the Loop", Larry says he was a writer on Norm Crosby's Comedy Shop.

Larry is neurotic and self-involved. He is uncomfortable with displays of emotion and dislikes confrontation, so much so that he often deploys Artie to fight his professional battles for him. He is also very insecure about his appearance: he is always concerned about the size of his "ass", which he thinks is too big, and he was unable to disguise his displeasure at Dana Carvey's impression of him in the show's fourth season. Larry enjoys watching his own show in bed every night, which is something that frustrates his second wife Jeannie. He is addicted to an unspecified type of painkiller (possibly multiple types of painkillers), and was previously addicted to marijuana. His personal life is often more dysfunctional than his professional life: he has been married and divorced twice, and he is shown to have trouble developing intimate bonds with other people and is estranged from his family. He dates many women, such as Mimi Rogers, Sharon Stone, Ellen DeGeneres, and Dana Delany, but these relationships never last and are often doomed by elements of Larry's celebrity or work life. The end of the series provided some hope for Larry; his decision to leave his show seemed to bring him a bit of perspective, and his relationship with Illeana Douglas appeared to be more substantial than his previous attempts at intimacy.

Larry really likes frozen yogurt and often sends his assistant Beverly to get it for him.

In the episode "The Breakdown (Part One)", it is mentioned that Larry and Hank first met in the spring of 1985. Larry does not respect Hank and thinks that Hank is not very bright. Larry constantly avoids Hank because he does not like dealing with him. However, Hank sometimes acts as a voice of reason for Larry and solves his problems for him, whether intentionally or not. Larry infrequently expresses an underlying affection for Hank, despite finding him intolerable (telling his wife-to-be that he "loves him" in the episode "Hank's Wedding"), and on occasion steps beyond his comfort zone for the sake of their friendship, for example cutting short his much needed vacation in order to attend the grand opening of Hank's 'Look Around Cafe' In the episode "The Grand Opening".

Larry depends almost entirely upon Artie to protect him from the network executives and the unpleasant realities of show business. Larry claims he can't do the show without Artie because Artie is so loyal to him. In practice, Artie says what Larry finds too awkward or uncomfortable to say. Artie often colludes with Larry to achieve a desired end, and is the only person in Larry's professional life that can understand and connect with him. Artie's last name is never mentioned in any episode. The characterization of Artie is heavily inspired by Fred DeCordova, Johnny Carson's longtime producer.

Francine is Larry's first wife, whom he begins dating again after Jeannie leaves him. Hank and Artie strongly dislike Francine. Larry's second wife, Jeannie, leaves him to go to Chicago because she thinks that he is too involved with the show. After she leaves him, Larry takes things very hard and has a minor heart episode.

In the episode "Larry's Birthday", it is mentioned that Larry discovered Jerry when Jerry was performing at the comedy club Catch a Rising Star and hired him as the head writer for his show. Jerry was doing poorly as a comedian and was just about to quit the business before being hired. Due to budgetary reasons, Larry has to fire Jerry and he is unhappy with how bitter Jerry becomes after being fired.

Larry becomes unhappy with his previous agent Leo, so he hires Stevie. Stevie is very obnoxious and Artie does not seem to like him very much. However, Stevie is good at what he does initially and he is able to negotiate Larry a very lucrative contract. Larry is impressed that Stevie represents many high-powered clients. In the episode "The Beginning of the End", Larry fires Stevie after finding out that he double-crossed him by becoming comedian Jon Stewart's agent. Stewart, at this point, is in a position to replace Larry on his talk show, and Stevie negotiates for Stewart rather than Larry before being fired. Grant is believed to be inspired by Ari Emanuel.

Larry feels contempt for Melanie because he tends to dislike network executives. In the episode "The Garden Weasel", she makes him do live commercials on the show against his will. Larry argues with her afterwards, and she ends up assaulting him. Eventually, Larry once again has to rely on Artie to bluntly tell Melanie that he doesn't want to do the commercials.

==== Hank Kingsley ====
Hank Kingsley (all seasons) (born Henry Joseph Lepstein Jr.), played by Jeffrey Tambor, is the announcer and sidekick on The Larry Sanders Show, known for his "Hey now!" catchphrase (a takeoff on Ed McMahon's "Hi-yoooo!"). His father was Henry Joseph Kingsley, Sr., and he was married to Margaret Dolan, whom he later divorced.

Hank worked as a cruise director on a luxury Greek liner named Andropolis for eight years when he met Larry, who befriended him and took him to the show. Hank is exceptionally fond of Larry, and it is implied on multiple occasions that Hank may harbor some form of romantic or physical attraction toward Larry. Though both Hank and Larry are narcissistic, they generally act as foils to one another. Larry is neurotic and evasive, while Hank is open and somewhat naive. Though frequently exasperated by Hank's narcissism and insecurities, Larry will occasionally step in to help his on-air colleague, such as intervening in Hank's contract renegotiations with the network once it became clear that the top executive Shel Davidoff is not willing to give the sidekick a requested raise. While Larry's narcissistic personality sometimes results in positive outcomes for other characters, Hank's narcissism almost exclusively manifests itself in bullying. Unlike Larry, Hank is more than willing to lend his name to commercial products and tries to cultivate a cult of personality through his little-read newsletters, fan club, and so on. Hank tends to be dense and is frequently the butt of jokes, often without realizing it. While McMahon built success beyond The Tonight Show as a commercial spokesman and TV host in his own right, Hank's desire to emulate McMahon was constantly foiled by his ego and bumbling attempts at self-aggrandizement.

He is generally disrespected among his co-workers because of his ego and dimness. Hank will often act humble and unassuming, especially on camera or in front of media executives and other influential persons, but would become condescending and often quite nasty to anyone whom he perceives to be of a lower status. Hank spends considerable time furthering his career, often endorsing questionable products and working behind Larry's back to ensure his enduring presence on the show, even when Larry is being scrutinized.

Hank is shown to be relatively untalented as an on-air personality. In the "Hank's Contract" episode from the first season, the network, represented by its president Shel Davidoff, is so convinced about Hank's lack of options elsewhere in show business that they completely ignore his walk-off threats during contract renegotiations and refuse any of his demands. His limited performing talents become especially apparent in season six, during which it is continuously implied that Hank has no other opportunities after the show's end, as well as the first episode of the third season, in which Hank is forced to take a job reading lottery numbers for the local news. Though it is never explicitly stated, Hank seems as though he might be subtly aware of his inadequacy, causing him to amplify his bullying of coworkers.

On the romantic front, during the second season episode "Hank's Wedding", Hank marries a woman named Margaret Dolan who's a regional sales manager for the Sandwich King fast food chain. Only two weeks after meeting her on a personal appearance tour he had been on, Hank proposes through television at the end of an episode of The Larry Sanders Show. As Larry was getting ready to end that day's show taping following an interview segment with Adam Sandler, Hank delivered the impromptu proposal into the camera without prior notifying Larry or the executive producer Artie to the latter's great displeasure. However, after Margaret says yes and Hank picks Larry to be his best man, Artie (inspired by Tiny Tim's 1969 wedding on Johnny Carson's Tonight Show that brought in huge ratings) recognizes the potential for increased viewership as a result of Hank doing the same and is now the first to offer to have the wedding on the show, which Hank ecstatically accepts. Following an alcohol-fuelled bachelor party at a strip club with Ed McMahon among the partiers, Hank and Margaret get married on the show with Alex Trebek officiating the ceremony.

The couple got divorced only a year later with Margaret initiating the split unable to deal with Hank's excessive personal and professional focus on Larry to the exclusion of everyone else in his life. Hank does not maintain any long term relationships after the divorce though is occasionally seen on dates while his interaction with strippers and female escorts is either shown or implied both before and after his marriage.

A running gag in the series involved Hank sending his assistant to tell Larry that he would like to speak with him, only to then approach Larry asking "You wanted to see me?"

Artie described him once as someone who means well, but "keeps his brain at home in a box".

In the final episode ("Flip," original airdate 5/31/98), it is revealed that Hank offered his assistant Brian a job paying $300 a week ($503.50 in 2021 dollars) with no benefits, and that Brian was thinking of taking it.

==== Artie ====
"Artie" (all seasons), played by Rip Torn, is the producer of The Larry Sanders Show. His last name is never mentioned during the run of the show, but his full first name is Arthur. He has three sons named Eddie, Steve, and Cully, a grandfather named Jacob, and a mother named Adel. He has been married four times; his most recent wife is named Elaine. Artie is often shown drinking (typically either following a show taping or during a stressful situation), with his beverages of choice including vodka Salty Dogs and Glenlivet scotch whisky.

Artie served in the Marine Corps during the Korean War. His first job in show business was as a bouncer. Artie's first job as a producer was on The Jackie Gleason Show, under producer Bob Sterling. He had replaced Sterling as producer after working on the show for six months. Artie also worked on The Jack Paar Show and The Dick Cavett Show during his career prior to becoming producer of The Larry Sanders Show.

Artie is tough and very loyal to Larry, essentially taking on a fatherlike mentor role to Larry. He has a special ability to manipulate people into doing exactly what is best for the show. According to several interviews with both Rip Torn and series creator Garry Shandling, the character of Artie is largely based on long-serving TV and Film producer Fred De Cordova who produced (and eventually executive-produced) The Tonight Show for over twenty years, encompassing almost all of Johnny Carson's run as host including his iconic final broadcast. De Cordova himself guest-starred as himself in episode "Eight" and "As My Career Lay Dying". De Cordova reportedly presented Torn with a copy of the former's memoir, Johnny Came Lately: An Autobiography, inscribed "To the other Fred".

Like most of the employees on the show, Artie has little respect for Hank and believes he makes a number of very poor decisions. However Artie is wise enough to understand the dynamic relationship between Larry and Hank, and is often looking out for him as a result (see Hank's Divorce Episode).

Along with Hank, Artie strongly dislikes Larry's ex-wife Francine and is very unhappy when she reunites with him; when Larry is with Francine, he does not put full effort into the show. Artie has never forgiven Francine for smashing Larry's People Choice Award.

Artie dislikes all agents but he especially dislikes Stevie, Larry's sleazy and obnoxious agent, whom he slams against a wall for backstabbing Larry. Artie is very proud of Larry after he fires Stevie In the episode "The Beginning of the End".

Artie, like Larry, dislikes most network executives; but unlike Larry, he is able to deal with them. Larry depends on Artie to deal with executive Melanie for him. Artie mentions several times that he thinks that he killed a man like Melanie in Korea.

=== Personal assistants ===
==== Beverly Barnes ====
Beverly Barnes, played by Penny Johnson (all seasons), is Larry Sanders' personal assistant. Larry depends upon Beverly to do many simple tasks for him and she is very loyal to him. In the episode "The Breakdown (Part Two)", Beverly sleeps with Larry. Afterward, they both agree that it was a mistake to sleep together; however, in the episode "Office Romance" there is an implication that she still might have tender feelings for Larry when she abruptly leaves the office one day out of anger at his brief sexual relationship with Hank's secretary Darlene, saying, "Twice in one day is two times too many."

While respecting Larry and her mostly white co-workers, she sometimes expresses concern over what she feels is a lack of African Americans booked on the show. In "Beverly and the Prop Job" she even goes so far as to almost quit and work as the personal assistant to Laurence Fishburne after her cousin (played by Paul Mooney) convinces her that Larry's pushing of menial tasks on her (such as lacing up—but not shining—his shoes) makes Larry little more than a thinly veiled slavemaster. But after talking with her father, she comes to the conclusion that Larry is "a wonderful guy", who also pays more money than Laurence Fishburne. Unrelated to her race, she also briefly resents Larry in the episode "Would You Do Me a Favor?" when she complains about him not appreciating all the work and help she provides for him.

Beverly reveals she is pregnant in the episode "Beverly’s Secret", and her co-workers all place bets on who the father is. It is revealed that Eriq La Salle, one of the guests appearing on the show in the episode, is the father, after Larry, out of respect for Beverly, berates and insults Michael Bolton as he believes Bolton is the one who impregnated her only to then abandon her.

==== Darlene Chapinni ====
Darlene Chapinni, played by Linda Doucett, (seasons 1–3) was employed as sidekick Hank Kingsley's personal assistant for the first three seasons of the program. She quit her job as assistant (in episode two of season four) via a FedEx letter, informing Hank that she had chosen to follow a "holy man" in India. She is last seen in the final episode "Flip". After Darlene leaves, the personal assistant position is filled by Brian (whose last name is never given), played by Scott Thompson of The Kids in the Hall.

==== Brian ====
Brian, played by Scott Thompson (seasons 4–6), replaced Darlene as Hank's assistant. Upon being introduced, Brian said he was a "big fan" and impressed him by quoting the introduction from a game show Hank once hosted. Brian is openly gay, and although Hank seems uncomfortable at first, he is okay with Brian's orientation. In one episode, Hank is mistaken for being gay after a night on the town with Brian. Like Darlene, Brian is loyal to Hank, and even offers Hank advice from time to time. In season 6, Brian threatens to sue the show for sexual harassment after getting tired of Phil's gay jokes, but the suit is apparently called off after a surprising turn of events. In the final episode ("Flip," original airdate 5/31/98), Brian tells Mary Lou that Hank offered him a job paying $300 a week ($503.50 in 2021 dollars) with no benefits, and he was thinking of taking it.

=== Writing staff ===
==== Jerry Capen ====
Jerry Capen, played by Jeremy Piven, (seasons 1–2) is the show's head writer, but is fired from the show by Artie due to his promiscuous and consistently unprofessional nature in the episode "Larry's Birthday". His mother is named Shirley. Capen is first seen in the episode "The Promise".

==== Phil ====
Phil, played by Wallace Langham, (all seasons) is the show's head writer after Capen's departure. Phil's surname is never mentioned in the run of the series. He is the only character outside the main three to appear in every episode.

The character Phil begins his career as a writer for The Larry Sanders Show under the then-head writer Jerry, played by Jeremy Piven. After Jerry was written off of the show, it went several episodes without having the head writer character. Phil then persuaded Artie to promote him to head writer and then wanted to demote himself because he felt that the work was not as enjoyable as it was before.

Although Phil is quite young, he displays levels of bitterness, cynicism, and jadedness rarely seen in young professionals. He further doesn't take well to Larry's and Artie's occasional criticism of his writing and often feels unappreciated. Based on working with and around him, the show staffers observed Phil's material to improve whenever he is emotionally unfulfilled as seen when his girlfriend dumps him and Larry describes the monologue as never having been that good before. He is a Buddhist. At one point he leaves the show to develop a pilot for the network about a band from Seattle only to have his writing criticized by the network executives and by the future star of the show, Dave Chappelle, who says that Phil shouldn't be writing a "black show" even though it was never Phil's intention to write one.

Phil frequently makes sexist and homophobic comments, and generally does not seem to like racial diversity on the show - mentioning that his Asian characters are often female because it is "killing two birds with one stone." In the season five episode "The New Writer," Phil uses his role as the head writer to intentionally suppress Wendy's jokes in order to make her seem untalented, claiming that "women aren't funny."

==== Wendy Traston ====
Wendy Traston, played by Sarah Silverman, (seasons 5–6) is brought on as a staff writer in the episode "The New Writer". However, her jokes are not used because of the chauvinism and bias of the head writer, Phil, who favors the jokes of his male co-writers. She appeared in several episodes during the last two seasons.

==== Mike Patterson ====
Michael "Mike" Patterson is a writer played by John Riggi (seasons 1–3) who is brought on as a staff writer on The Larry Sanders Show before Jerry is fired. Patterson is first seen in the episode "Larry's Birthday", and last seen in the episode "Headwriter". Patterson was created by Maya Forbes.

=== Talent bookers ===
==== Paula ====
Paula, played by Janeane Garofalo, (seasons 1–5) is the show's talent booker (although another character, Kiki, is shown as the talent booker in the season 2 episode "Performance Artist"). Throughout the run of the series, her last name is never mentioned. She has a very dry sense of humor and cringes at any display of sentimentality.

In the second-season episode "Artie's Gone", Arthur trusts her to produce the show on her own.

In the episode "Montana", as Larry is trying to assemble the show's former staffers after what turned out to be his short-lived retirement from show business, he approaches Paula to gauge her interest in continuing at her old job. She says that she has an offer to be the associate producer on the Conan O'Brien Show. Larry's response comes in the form of a question: "I can understand why you'd want to take the Conan O'Brien job over this one. It's a good sh... How long do you think that's going to stay on the air?", to which frightened Paula replies: "See you Monday".

However, Paula's second stint with the show is not without problems as Larry comes very close to firing her in the episode "The Gift Episode" after several high-profile guests pull out of the commitment despite already being booked. In a conversation with Artie, Larry expresses a personal opinion that Paula isn't right for the job "because she doesn't have the right personality". He goes on to state that "she's too....", but before Larry can finish, Artie interjects with three offerings "abrasive?", "brusque?", and "incapable of putting a performer at ease because she has a basic contempt for the business?". Larry's answer is a vehement "no" after each of the first two, and a strong "yes" after the third one.

In the episode "The Matchmaker", she gets an inexperienced assistant, Mary Lou Collins, who makes frequent mistakes in research notes for Larry's interviews leading to several on-air embarrassing situations during the Nicollette Sheridan segment.

Paula last appears in "Pain Equals Funny". After performing the booking job for five years, she gets an offer to be the producer on a daytime program Caryl & Marilyn: Real Friends. On one hand, she is not thrilled about going to daytime, but on the other, it's the realization of her dream to one day produce. Also, as she tells Larry about her present job while informing him that she's leaving: "I can only derive a limited amount of personal satisfaction from booking the parrot lady". Larry wants to keep her and immediately offers her a promotion to produce The Larry Sanders Show. According to how Larry envisioned her promotion right there on the spot, she'd be working under the show's longtime executive producer Artie, which she ecstatically accepts. However, the arrangement quickly turns sour as Artie, already feeling disrespected and threatened by the whole proceeding, walks off the show following a disagreement with Paula over a production issue of lighting during which Larry takes her side. Faced with a sudden crisis, Larry lets her produce that day's show by herself, before summoning her to his office to inform her that the arrangement won't work and ask her to see if the daytime job is still open. On the same occasion, he lets her know how much he's always liked her, basically coming on to her, and also expressing hope that once all has settled down they can maybe go out. Angry and flattered at the same time, perplexed Paula says that she's never been fired this way. As she's packing her stuff the next day, Artie approaches Paula at her desk and after imparting some words of wisdom from his long experience being a producer says that there are still some tricks that he could teach her, meaning that he had a change of heart and is now fine with her working alongside him. However, the very next day after seeing her in the office, Larry is now unhappy to learn about the new turn because as he says to Artie: "I never would've told her I liked her if I'd known she was staying". This was the last time the character of Paula appeared on the show. In the canon of the show, it is unclear whether the character of Paula remained employed or was later dismissed. The supporting cast in general is featured less in the sixth season, so it is conceivable that, in the show's universe, the character of Paula is still employed during this time but is simply never shown.

==== Mary Lou Collins ====
Mary Lou Collins, played by Mary Lynn Rajskub, (seasons 5–6) is an assistant talent booker. Working under Paula, she frequently makes mistakes in researching the celebrities, which led to Larry looking foolish on air. However, Mary Lou eventually became more competent in the position and fills Paula's shoes. Outside of her role as a talent booker, Mary Lou is frequently shown to be socially inept and have very low IQ.

In season 6's The Interview, Mary Lou accidentally hits Hank's car, but has difficulty confessing this to him. As a result, Hank misunderstands her confession attempts as her having a crush on him, and invites her to dinner. Mary Lou confides in Beverly that she's attracted to sensitive men (which Hank is far from), and later tries to subtly rebuff every move Hank makes on her. However, when Hank breaks down while watching Larry being interviewed on Extra (TV series), Mary Lou finds herself attracted to him.

==== Kiki Rosatti ====
Kiki Rosatti, played by Maureen Mueller, (season 2) is shown as head booker in the episode "Performance Artist".

=== Cue card ===
==== Sid ====
Sid, played by Sid Newman (all seasons), holds the cue cards for Larry during the show. He dies by suicide in the last season, with Hank blaming himself.

== Professional associates ==
=== Agents ===
==== Leo ====
Leo is Larry's longtime agent, played by John Pleshette (season 2). He is dumped by Larry in the middle of contract re-negotiations as Larry decides to pursue a big-money contract with the help of high-powered Hollywood agent Stevie Grant.

Leo is introduced as a good-natured, personable individual whom Larry socializes with outside of work. The agent always carries around a baggie of nuts that he fidgets with and chews on as a nervous tic of sorts. Although generally pleased with Leo's representation, Larry is sensing that, when it comes to the latest contract negotiations, his agent might not be up to the task of going after "Letterman money"—something that the late-night host feels he deserves having done the show for six years. He can hardly hide his disappointment with the latest offer Leo comes back with after lunch with the network's head of business affairs. Leo explains that Letterman had to leave a network in order to get the kind of money Larry wants, while Larry insists that "we can do better". Asked by Leo how much better, perplexed Larry says "I want you to tell me" before Leo whispers another figure into his ear to which Larry immediately starts shaking his head in disappointment followed by an instruction to Leo to pass on the network's latest official offer. As he departs, Leo sheepishly asks him "how much of a fight do you want to put up here", to which already somewhat irritated Larry responds "I don't want a fight, Leo, I want you to fight". The next day, Larry goes out to lunch with Stevie Grant and decides to sign with him, thus dumping Leo.

Leo is predictably devastated when broken the news at Larry's home during a dinner also attended by Artie and Francine, while Larry maintains this is strictly a business decision and doesn't want Leo to take it personally. Leo naturally does and their longtime friendship ends.

Leo's other clients aren't particularly effusive about his agent skills either. Soon after ending the business association with Leo, Larry bumps into musician Doc Severinsen, also represented by Leo; Doc mentions not being happy with what Leo has done for his career though still staying on due to Leo's willingness to travel with him on the road.

==== Stevie Grant ====
Steven "Stevie" Grant is Larry's obnoxious agent, played by Bob Odenkirk (seasons 2–6), whom Larry signs with during contract renegotiations with the network. High-strung and cajoling, Stevie often uses a combination of profane and ostentatious language to punctuate his points.

His appearances on the show generally take place amid great turmoil and tension, such as contract negotiations, network sale, walk-off threats, and hosting takeover attempts.

Unlike with his previous agent Leo, Larry maintains a strictly professional relationship with Stevie, without any socializing.

Stevie, a young aggressive hot-shot Hollywood agent on the way up, is introduced in the episode "Larry's Agent" as Larry's contract is being renegotiated by his longtime agent and friend—Leo. Seemingly unrelated to the ongoing renegotiation, Stevie stops by the show and greets Artie and Larry backstage following the director Barry Levinson's guest spot on the show. Stevie says he's only there to "hold Levinson's hand" because he had signed him the previous week, but doesn't miss an opportunity to inquire about the contract renegotiation while encouraging Larry to keep on by telling him he's "got the network by the balls". Stevie then suddenly leans in and says: "Hey, if Leo's having a hard time with this thing, I sure would like to take a shot", to which somewhat flattered Larry politely replies that Leo's got it covered. As Stevie leaves, Artie expresses displeasure at Stevie failing to shake his offered hand at the beginning of the brief encounter while slightly impressed Larry brings up the talk around the entertainment industry about Stevie being the "next Michael Ovitz". Despite Larry's denials, Artie is already sensing he wants to fire Leo and lets him know as much in front of his girlfriend Francine, who even frowns upon the very thought.

The very next day, however, Larry does precisely that, having lunch with Stevie Grant at Spago and informing him afterwards that he's signing with him. Stevie immediately goes in very aggressively at the network. While running into one another at the elevator, Larry is ostensibly casually informed by the network president Sheldon Davidoff that Stevie drives an extremely tough bargain. Sheldon further relays his surprise at Larry being willing to leave the network and move the show to New York City, all of which stunned Larry hears about for the first time but plays coy anyway despite just realizing Stevie threw that bluff without even consulting him. Sheldon concludes the brief conversation by saying: "That Stevie Grant has no fears", before trailing off: "Oh well, it isn't his career he's playing with". Furious Larry immediately confronts his new agent for performing such a stunt without keeping him in the loop, but Stevie reassures him it's all about the leverage, telling Larry he'd even be willing to take the syndication deal from King World if he doesn't get the money from the network. Rapidly cooling on Stevie's punch-in-the-gut style, scared Larry confides in Artie that "Stevie Grant is totally out of fucking control". The occurrence that makes Larry finally decide to dump Stevie is a conversation in which the agent pushes the New York move like a real possibility because his agency apparently has a good relationship with King World, and "King World is sweet on New York". Talking things over with Artie at the office again, Larry calls his new agent "a prick", "a liar", "two-faced", and "weird" just as Stevie is coming into the room with a new offer from the network written on a piece of paper. Artie excuses himself from the room, while Larry is so sick of everything that he's determined to break things off with Stevie right there before even hearing the offer. As he's delivering his "Listen, Stevie, I've been thinking about a lot of things...." spiel, Stevie hands him the piece of paper and Larry glances at it after a few moments but crucially before getting to the gist of his speech already in progress. Obviously ecstatic with the offered figure, Larry does a complete turnaround on the spot and decides not to get rid of Stevie.

Stevie's next appearance is in the episode "L.A. or N.Y.?", which was the second season's finale. After meeting Richard "Dick" Jermaine who represents the foreign beer producer that's about to buy the network, Larry is so displeased with the overall vibe he gets from the man—particularly with his idea to overhaul the show into a "late night news magazine wrap-up of the day's events with a hip MTV sensibility"—that he immediately contacts Stevie about his options to leave, citing his inability to work for "this fucking beer nut" as the reason. Stevie's immediate reaction is one of rehearsed loud jubilation: "Yesss, fuck that beer baron! We're fuckin' outta here!" Upon being told by Larry to keep it down, Stevie apologizes by saying "I live for this shit. It gets me all hot and wet." Stevie proceeds to inform Larry that he had already talked to Ted Harbert at ABC where according to Stevie "they'd kill their grandmothers" to have the New Larry Sanders Show After Nightline, which, as he adds, is "unfortunately the title they want to use". In addition to all of the above, Stevie tells Larry that the ABC people want him to do the show from New York City instead of L.A. Larry is receptive to all of it except for the move to NYC; the opposition to which at one point even prompts him to deliver his by now usual threat of moving to Montana, which Stevie takes half-jokingly by quipping it would make a great sitcom. Faced with a difficult decision under severe pressure from his girlfriend Francine as well as the show's staff who are scared for their jobs, Larry is soon informed by Stevie that the ABC deal is almost locked up and is shown a one-year contract figure. Unhappy with the lack of a long-term commitment on ABC's part, Larry wonders out loud to Stevie "if Harbert is such a big fan, how come the deal is only for a year". In his retort, Stevie flippantly points out that "these guys never last", adding: "he'll be out of a job within a year and we'll renegotiate". Larry doesn't like any of it, while Stevie attempts to reassure him: "Larry, don't micromanage, let me handle the details". Larry's response verges on anger: "You know what your problem is, Stevie? You're talking to me like you think I believe you" before he goes on stage to do a show at the end of which he announces his retirement and intention to spend the rest of his life in Montana.

In the episode "People's Choice" Stevie is livid after finding out Larry agreed to host the People's Choice Awards as a favor to Artie, who is producing this year. Stevie is beside himself that Larry made a decision without consulting him. Instead of hosting by himself, which is what he thought he was agreeing to, Larry is angrily informed by Stevie that he actually agreed to co-host with Rita Moreno and Dean Cain. To further drive his point home Stevie makes Larry repeat the following out loud: "Co-hosting detracts from my essential specialness in the marketplace".

When Larry becomes addicted to painkillers in the episode "End of the Season", thus missing a week of shows and forcing the staff to call Pat Sajak to guest-host the show, he's cared for at his home by old friend Roseanne Barr, and Stevie pays him a visit with a fruit basket in tow. However, while talking to Larry alone, Stevie's much more interested in Roseanne's agent situation at the rival William Morris Agency - at one point even asking Larry whether he knows if she's happy with the representation over there. As jittery and distracted Larry reaches for the wrapped-up fruit basket on the table, Stevie informs him that it's actually for Roseanne while also telling him that his basket won't be ready until tomorrow because "you like that sugar-free shit, right".

In the episode "Conflict of Interest", Stevie starts dating the Larry Sanders Show talent booker Paula, which soon raises suspicion among the staff that he's only doing it in order to use their relationship as a way to get his lesser-known clients such as Ed Begley, Jr., Sally Struthers, Jake Johansen, and Andy Kindler booked on the show.

He is first seen in the episode "Larry's Agent", and was created by Garry Shandling, Paul Simms, Maya Forbes, and Drake Sather.

==== Sid Bessel ====
Sid Bessel, played by Phil Leeds (seasons 3–4) is Hank's agent, an elderly Jewish American out of step with modern showbusiness. Hank seems to be aware of Sid's inadequacies and is excited to sign with another agent when he thinks Sid is dying. However Hank never fires Sid, which is one of the few instances in which Hank is implied to have any type of empathy.

=== Publicists ===
==== Norman Litkey ====
Norman Litkey is Larry's publicist throughout the series, played by David Paymer (seasons 1, 3, 5, 6).

He's a bald, slightly neurotic showbiz insider who seemingly derives enormous amounts of personal satisfaction from exploiting anything and everything for publicity purposes.

Norman makes his first appearance in the episode "A Brush with the Elbow of Greatness" in order to handle the fallout following an incident involving Larry that occurred at a supermarket in Larchmont Village. Local newscast runs a piece in which shopper named Carol Biederman accuses Larry of knocking her into a magazine rack by pushing in front of her in the checkout line. Larry doesn't remember doing any such thing and maintains his innocence saying he only recalls having a splitting headache that night and quickly running into the supermarket to get some Excedrin and artichokes. Naturally, due to Larry's celebrity, the story generates some media interest that quickly goes into overdrive once the supermarket's security camera footage suddenly surfaces. The tape is obtained by Entertainment Tonight, however, Artie gets a copy before it airs and watches it with Larry thus realizing that contrary to Larry's recollection, the late-night star clearly did bump this woman into a rack. Depressed about the tape airing in a few hours, they summon publicity man Norman Litkey who's surprisingly cheerful about what happened, referring to it as "publicity bonanza" and repeatedly exclaiming in delight: "Gentlemen, I'm wetting myself" (a phrase he says throughout the series, whenever he becomes excited). Norman mentions to Larry that instead of publicly apologizing to Ms. Biederman like she demanded, thereby immediately nipping the whole thing in the bud, he should ride the wave of publicity and enjoy the increased viewership this extra attention will surely bring. Or as Norman puts it: "let's not kill this cow before we've milked it", before drawing comparisons to the 1990 Roseanne Barr national anthem incident at a baseball game that projected her show from number twelve to number one in the viewership ratings. Reluctantly, Larry agrees to hold off the apology and see how the thing plays out over the next few days. Depressed from the relentless beating he's taking in the media for what he did, Larry spends most of his time locked in his office saying he wants to quit show business and move to Montana. He finally reaches a point where he can't take it any longer and decides to apologize. Norman supports his decision, seeing it now as "the right, human, and only thing to do", however, in order to maximize the publicity effect he suggests Larry do it by having the woman on the show, which Larry reluctantly agrees to again.

Norman makes a comeback when Larry and Sharon Stone begin to date, looking to exploit his client's relationship with a major Hollywood star for publicity. His advice to Larry is to "get his head right in close to Sharon" when the paparazzi are taking her photos outside of restaurants. As Larry is rolling his eyes at the suggestion, Norman proceeds to explain "the second law of thermodynamics" to his client: "heat always passes from a hotter body to a cooler body, and never the other way around — see, you're getting her heat, and that means the show is getting heat, and that means my kids will eat". Surprised Larry asks: "You have kids?", to which Norman has a ready retort: "There're some kids in my neighborhood, who gives a shit".

He is first seen in the episode "A Brush with the Elbow of Greatness", and was created by Maya Forbes & Peter Tolan.

=== Network executives ===
==== Dennis ====
Dennis (seasons 2–5) is a network executive in his forties played by Doug Ballard who favors the idea of cutting costs by replacing Larry with a new host, which would enable the network to dump Larry's huge salary.

Dennis's first appearance took place during "Life Behind Larry" where he was one of the two executives involved with filling the 12:35 am spot after Larry's show (the other one being Melanie Parrish). Two of them suggested Bob Saget and Dave Coulier while Larry pushed for Bobcat Goldthwait only to see the job eventually go to Tom Snyder.

In the episode "Larry's on Vacation" (season 4 finale) while he and a fellow executive Melanie Parish discuss guest host Sandra Bernhard's ratings vs. Larry's, Dennis is the first to put forth the idea of replacing their highly paid star. He reasons that since Sandra Bernhard is able to pull the same audience share as Larry and also get a younger demographic, the network would save a lot by bringing in a fresh face that would be willing to work for much less than Larry's current salary. Asked by somewhat surprised Melanie if he specifically wants Sandra to become the new host, Dennis says that it could be anybody (Jon Stewart, Rosie O'Donnell, etc.).

In the next episode, as Jon Stewart prepares to guest-host another week, Dennis, backed up by Melanie, says to Artie that they want to bring Jon in as the permanent guest host or as he puts it: "we want to make sure we have a backup quarterback".

Dennis is first seen in the episode "Life Behind Larry" and last seen in the episode "Everybody Loves Larry". He was created by Peter Tolan.

==== Kenny Mitchell ====
Kenny Mitchell (seasons 2 and 6) is a network executive in his thirties played by Joshua Malina who is brought in to administer major changes to the Larry Sanders Show in order to make it appeal to a younger demographic.

Kenny is first introduced tagging along with Roger Bingham, when they drop into Larry's office unannounced in order to talk to him about "doing a little fine-tuning to get the numbers up" since he's losing to Keenan in certain key cities. To that end, Kenny starts to inform Larry and Artie about the ideas/suggestions that the network's research department has come up with (a more enthusiastic Leno-type opening with running through the audience and shaking their hands, different hairstyle for Larry), but is repeatedly interrupted by an uninterested Larry. As the fifth and last suggestion/idea, Kenny lists a snappier theme song at which point he plays a tape with the funky number done by "the guy who did the Singled Out theme".

Very soon afterward, Kenny is assigned to the show as the creative consultant to oversee the implementation of the various changes. Not surprisingly, right from the start, he's despised by everyone, especially Artie who calls him a "pimple-faced chaperone". When Kenny crudely insults the show to Artie's face, Artie physically assaults Kenny. Mitchell is first seen in the episode "Another List" and last seen in the episode "Adolf Hankler".

==== Melanie Parrish ====
Melanie Parrish (all seasons), a woman in her forties, is the Vice President of Programming played by Deborah May who often has conflicts with Larry. In the episode "The Garden Weasel", it is mentioned that Melanie has recently been made the Vice President of Programming at the network, which means she is in charge of late night programming. Also in the episode, Melanie forces Larry to begin performing live commercials for products that sponsor the show. Larry tries to get out of it and ends up being hit in the face by Melanie.

Melanie is tough and often uses foul language to prove her point. Artie mentions that Melanie reminds him of a man that he killed in Korea.

She is last seen in the episode "Adolf Hankler". Parrish's character was created by Peter Tolan.

==== Roger Bingham ====
Roger Bingham (seasons 5–6) is a slick network executive in his mid-to-late thirties, played by Bruce Greenwood, who favours Jon Stewart to be the host over Larry.

Roger is first mentioned by another network executive, Dennis, during "Everybody Loves Larry" as being someone who "feels very strongly about Jon Stewart".

Roger's first actual appearance on the show is in the episode "Larry's New Love" when he steps in along with Kenny Mitchell to retool the Larry Sanders Show after it starts to slip in the ratings. Bingham is first seen in the episode "Larry's New Love", and last seen in the episode "The Beginning of the End".

==== Sheldon Davidoff ====
Sheldon "Shel" Davidoff (seasons 1–2) is the president of the network, played by James Karen. He is close friends with Artie and they associate together outside of work.

An old school executive, Sheldon carries himself in dignified manner, never swearing or raising his voice around the office. In stark contrast to other executives at "the network", he seems to display genuine care and compassion for the people he deals with at work.

Davidoff's character was created by Peter Tolan, and is last seen in the episode "Larry's Agent".

== Larry's wives ==
=== Jeannie Sanders ===
Jeannie Sanders, played by Megan Gallagher (seasons 1 and 4), is married to Larry in the first season. At the beginning of season 2 it is revealed they have started the process of divorce.

=== Francine Sanders ===
Francine Sanders, played by Kathryn Harrold (season 2), is a reporter. She was married to Larry prior to the events of The Larry Sanders Show; they briefly rekindle their relationship after he and Jeannie split up.
