= List of awards and nominations received by Judd Apatow =

Judd Apatow awards and nominations
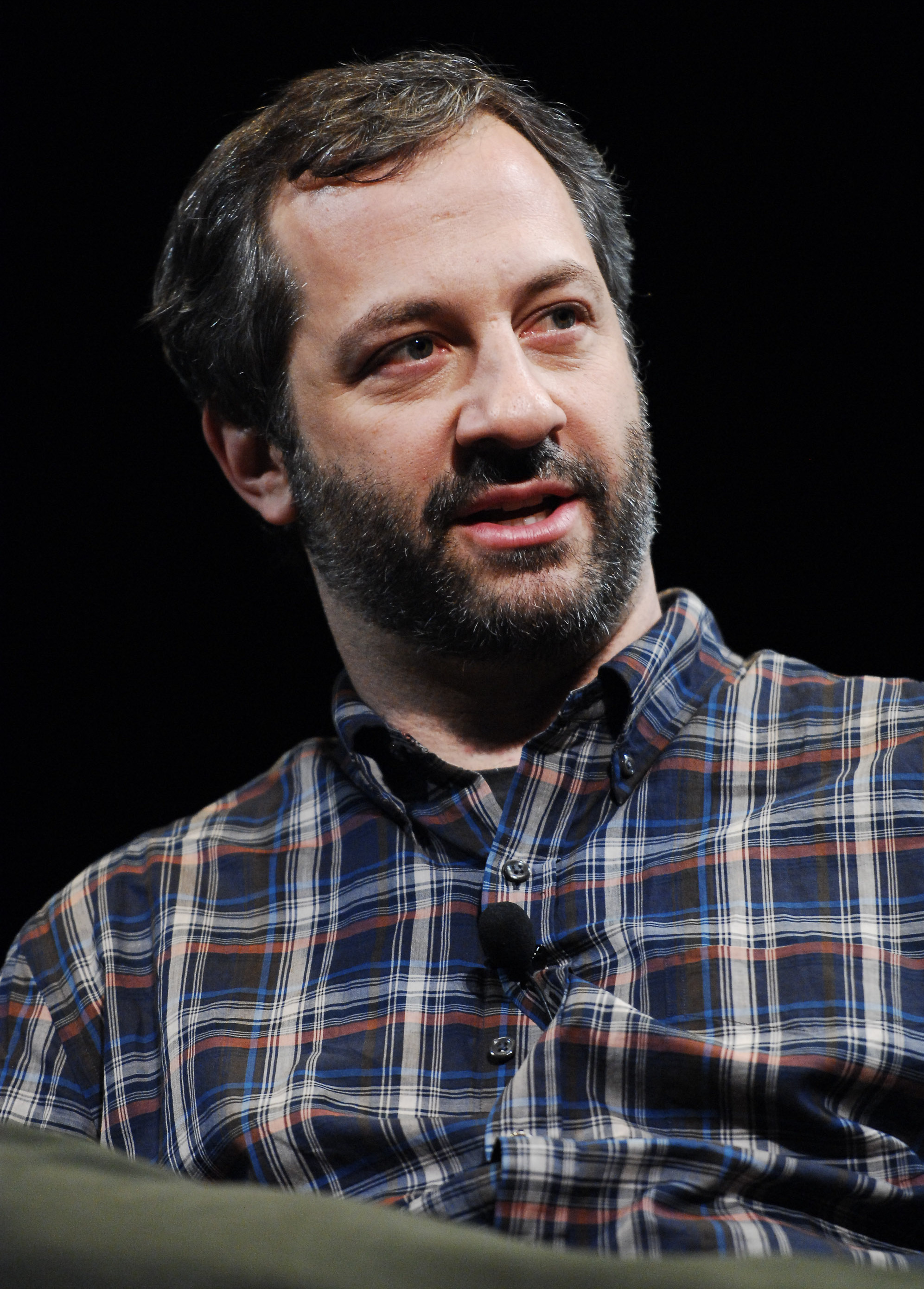
- Apatow in 2012
Award	Wins	Nominations
BAFTA Awards	1	1
Emmy Awards	3	13
Golden Globe Award	0	1
Grammy Award	0	1

This article is a list of awards and nominations received by the American film director, writer, and comedian Judd Apatow. He has received numerous accolades including three Primetime Emmy Awards and a BAFTA Award as well as nominations for a Golden Globe Award, and a Grammy Award.

== Major associations ==
=== BAFTA Awards ===
British Academy Television Award
Year	Category	Nominated work	Result	Ref.
2013	Best International Programme	Girls	Won	

=== Emmy Awards ===
Primetime Emmy Awards
Year	Category	Nominated work	Result	Ref.
1993	Outstanding Writing for a Variety Program	The Ben Stiller Show	Won	
1994	Outstanding Comedy Series	The Larry Sanders Show (season two)	Nominated	
1996	Outstanding Comedy Series	The Larry Sanders Show (season four)	Nominated	
1997	Outstanding Comedy Series	The Larry Sanders Show (season five)	Nominated	
1997	Outstanding Writing for a Comedy Series	The Larry Sanders Show (episode: "Ellen, or Isn't She?")	Nominated	
1998	Outstanding Comedy Series	The Larry Sanders Show (season six)	Nominated	
2012	Outstanding Comedy Series	Girls (season one)	Nominated	
2013	Outstanding Comedy Series	Girls (season two)	Nominated	
2017	Outstanding Documentary or Nonfiction Series	30 for 30	Nominated	
2018	Outstanding Documentary or Nonfiction Special	The Zen Diaries of Garry Shandling	Won	
2018	Outstanding Directing for a Documentary/Nonfiction Program	The Zen Diaries of Garry Shandling	Nominated	
2022	Outstanding Documentary or Nonfiction Special	George Carlin's American Dream	Won	
2022	Outstanding Directing for a Documentary/Nonfiction Program	George Carlin's American Dream	Nominated	

=== Golden Globe Awards ===
Year	Category	Nominated work	Result	Ref.
2007	Best Original Song	"Walk Hard", Walk Hard: The Dewey Cox Story	Nominated	

=== Grammy Awards ===
Year	Category	Nominated work	Result	Ref.
2009	Best Song Written for Visual Media	"Walk Hard", Walk Hard: The Dewey Cox Story	Nominated	

== Guild awards ==
=== Costume Designers Guild Awards ===
Year	Category	Nominated work	Result	Ref.
2014	Distinguished Collaborator Award		Received	

=== Producers Guild of America Awards ===
Year	Category	Nominated work	Result	Ref.
2011	Outstanding Producer of Theatrical Motion Picture	Bridesmaids	Nominated	
2017	Outstanding Producer of Theatrical Motion Picture	The Big Sick	Nominated	
2022	Outstanding Producer of Non-Fiction Television	George Carlin's American Dream	Nominated	

=== Writers Guild of America Awards ===
Year	Category	Nominated work	Result	Ref.
1997	Episodic Comedy	The Larry Sanders Show (Episode: ""Ellen, or Isn't She?")	Nominated	
2005	Best Original Screenplay	The 40 Year Old Virgin	Nominated	
2007	Best Original Screenplay	Knocked Up	Nominated	
2012	Best New Series	Girls (season one)	Won	
2012	Best Comedy Series	Girls (season one)	Nominated	

== Miscellaneous awards ==
=== CableACE Awards ===
Year	Category	Nominated work	Result	Ref.
1994	Best Comedy Series	The Larry Sanders Show	Won	
1995	Best Comedy Series	The Larry Sanders Show	Won	

=== Critics Choice Awards ===
Year	Category	Nominated work	Result	Ref.
Critics' Choice Movie Awards
2012	Louis XIII Genius Award		Received	
Critics' Choice Documentary Awards
2022	Best Director	George Carlin's American Dream	Nominated	

=== Gold Derby Awards ===
Year	Category	Nominated work	Result	Ref.
2005	Original Screenplay	The 40 Year Old Virgin	Nominated	
2007	Original Screenplay	Knocked Up	Nominated	
2013	Comedy Episode of the Year	Girls (episode: "Beach House")	Nominated	

=== Hollywood Film Awards ===
Year	Category	Nominated work	Result	Ref.
2012	Comedy of the Year	This is 40	Won	

=== Houston Film Critics Society ===
Year	Category	Nominated work	Result	Ref.
2007	Best Original Song	"Walk Hard", Walk Hard: The Dewey Cox Story	Nominated	

=== Las Vegas Film Critics Society ===
Year	Category	Nominated work	Result	Ref.
2007	Best Song	"Walk Hard", Walk Hard: The Dewey Cox Story	Nominated	

=== Locarno International Film Festival ===
Year	Category	Nominated work	Result	Ref.
2007	Audience Award	Knocked Up	Nominated	
2015	Variety Pizza Grande Award	Trainwreck	Nominated	

=== Razzie Awards ===
Year	Category	Nominated work	Result	Ref.
2022	Worst Director	The Bubble	Nominated	

=== The Stinkers Bad Movie Awards ===
Year	Category	Nominated work	Result	Ref.
2005	Worst Screenplay	Fun with Dick and Jane	Nominated	

=== Women Film Critics Circle ===
Year	Category	Nominated work	Result	Ref.
2009	Hall of Shame (Two words: Judd Apatow. Some more words: perfect, beautiful women exist to save overweight schlubby men from their otherwise inevitable fate as complete no-hopers")		Received	
