= Linda Doucett =

American actress and model

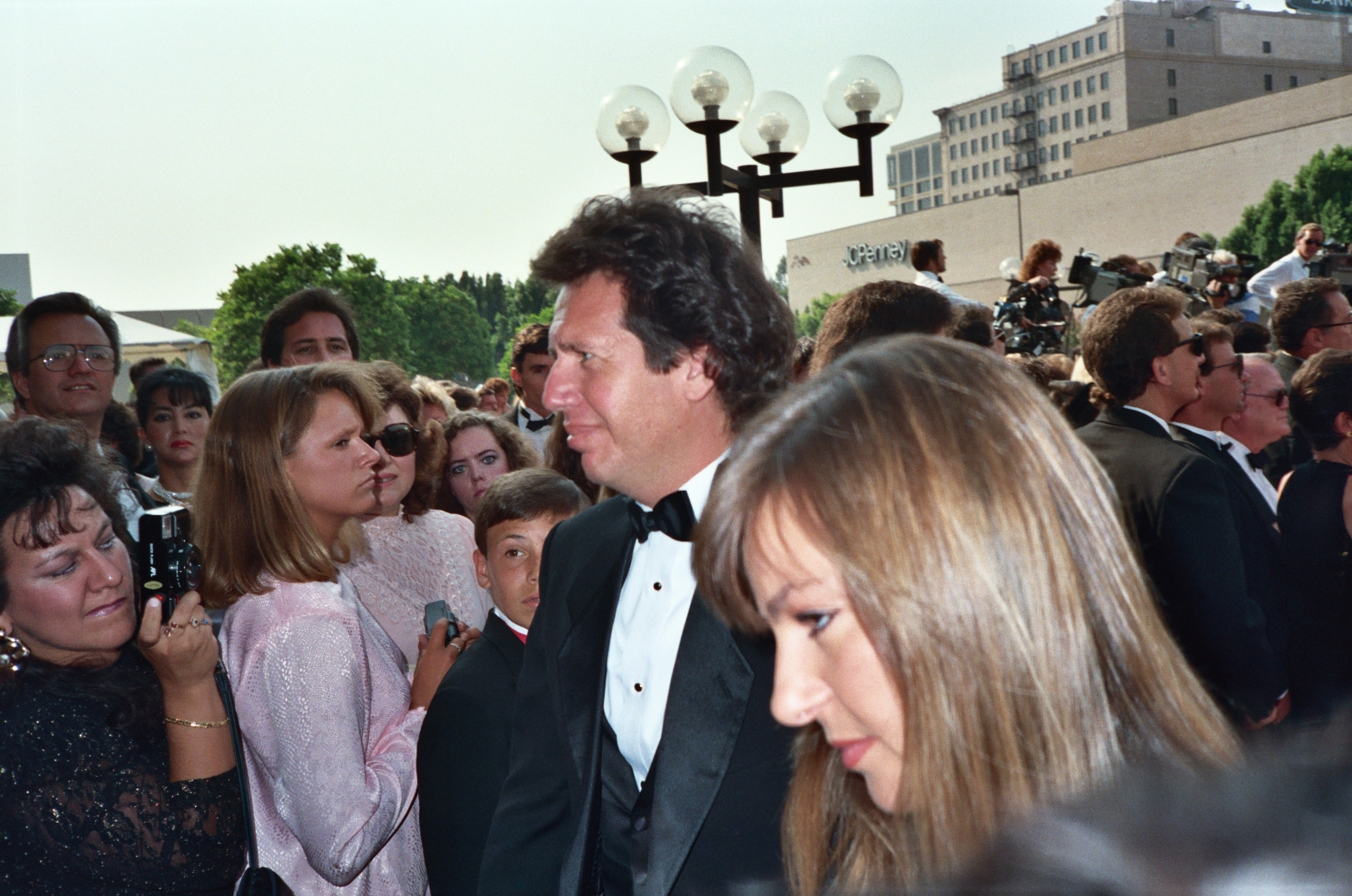
- Linda Doucett (front) in 1988
- Born: Linda L. Durst; July 2, 1954 (age 72); Pittsburgh, Pennsylvania, U.S.
- Other names: Linda L. Doucett; Linda Durst
- Occupations: Actress, model
- Years active: 1989–2000
- Known for: The Larry Sanders Show
- Partner(s): Garry Shandling (1987–1994)

Linda L. Doucett (born July 2, 1954) is an American actress and model. She had a supporting role on The Larry Sanders Show and appeared in Playboy magazine. She also appeared in Herman's Head, Tales from the Crypt, and the made-for-television film Badge of Betrayal.

== Career ==
Doucett began her modeling career in high school and got her start in acting by working as an extra in music videos for bands, such as Toto and the Beach Boys.

From 1992 to 1994, she played Darlene Chapinni, a devoted assistant to the titular host's sidekick Hank Kingsley, on The Larry Sanders Show. She was a regular for the first three seasons and replaced by Scott Thompson in 1994 after the first episode of the fourth season.

In 1993, Doucett posed in the September issue of Playboy. The release of that issue of Playboy coincided with the episode Broadcast Nudes of The Larry Sanders Show where her character is fictionally asked to pose for Playboy as well.

== Personal life ==
Doucett met Garry Shandling at a party and dated him from 1987 to 1994. In 1994, when their relationship ended, Shandling had her dismissed from The Larry Sanders Show. In turn, Doucett filed a lawsuit against Shandling and producer Brad Grey's company Brillstein-Grey Entertainment for sexual harassment and wrongful termination, which was settled out of court in 1997 for $1 million.

In 2008, Doucett testified along with Shandling, Sylvester Stallone, and others against Anthony Pellicano for illegal wiretapping and other crimes.

== Filmography ==
=== Film ===
Year	Title	Role
1989	Scenes from the Class Struggle in Beverly Hills	Woman in Window

=== Television ===
Year	Title	Role	Notes
1989	It's Garry Shandling's Show	Susan	Episode: "Take My Wife, for Example"
1991	The Young and the Restless	Karen Miller	Episode #1.4589
1991	Herman's Head	Woman	Episode: "Bracken's Daughter"
1992–1994, 1998	The Larry Sanders Show	Darlene Chapinni	45 episodes
1994	Tales from the Crypt	Valerie	Episode: "In the Groove"
1997	Badge of Betrayal	Patty Renault	Television film
2000	The Street	Busty Bartender	Episode: "Hostile Makeover"

=== Appearances ===
Year	Title	Role	Notes
2003	Bill Maher: Victory Begins at Home	Self	Stand-up special
2018	The Zen Diaries of Garry Shandling	Former Girlfriend	Documentary
