= Barbara Calvert =

British barrister

The Right Honourable The Lady Lowry QC
- Born: Barbara Adamson Parker; 30 April 1926; Leeds, Yorkshire, England
- Died: 22 July 2015 (aged 89)
- Other names: Barbara, Lady Lowry; Barbara Calvert, Lady Lowry
- Citizenship: United Kingdom
- Education: St Helen's School; London School of Economics
- Occupation: Barrister
- Spouses: John Thornton Calvert (m. 1948; died 1987) Robert Lowry, Baron Lowry (m. 1994; died 1999)
- Children: Two

Barbara Adamson Calvert, QC (née Parker; 30 April 1926 – 22 July 2015), known as The Lady Lowry after her second marriage, was a British barrister specialising in family law. She was the first woman to be a head of chambers when she founded 4 Brick Court in 1974.

== Early life ==
Calvert was born on 30 April 1926 in Leeds, Yorkshire, England. Her father was Albert Parker CBE, a chemist. She was educated at St. Helen's School, a private all-girls school in Northwood, London. She went on to study economics at the London School of Economics.

== Legal career ==
After her first marriage in 1948, Calvert was a housewife. At a New Year's Eve party in the late 1950s, she was encouraged by a friend of her husband to look at a career in law.

On 24 November 1959, she was called to the bar at Middle Temple; at that time, only 3% of barristers were women. She joined the chambers run by John Platts-Mills as a barrister.

In 1974, she set up her own chambers at 4 Brick Court. In doing so, she became the first female Head of Chambers. It had four women as founding members and the chambers was quickly nicknamed "the Monstrous Regimen of Women" (a play on The First Blast of the Trumpet Against the Monstruous Regiment of Women). In 2000, the chambers merged with another to form Coram Chambers.

On 6 April 1978, she was called to the Inner Bar of Northern Ireland; she therefore became a Queen's Counsel (QC). She was the first female QC to be called in Northern Ireland. She was appointed a Recorder, a part-time judge, on 7 November 1980 with effect from 10 November. On 15 March 1982, she was elected a Bencher of the Middle Temple; the first woman to receive that honour.

In 1986, she left her chambers and was appointed Chair of the Industrial Tribunals, the independent judicial bodies that deal with employment law matters in Northern Ireland. She was the first woman to be appointed to this post.

== Later life ==
Calvert was an honorary door tenant of 1 Pump Court Chambers. At the age of 75, she became chairwoman of the Grandparents' Federation (now the Grandparents' Association), a charity for grandparents' rights. She later stood down and was appointed a vice-president.

She died on 22 July 2015, aged 89. A memorial service was held on 13 November 2015 at the Temple Church, City of London.

== Personal life ==
In 1948, at the age of 21, she married John Thornton Calvert. They had two children. He was 20 years older than her and died in 1987.

In 1994, she married Lord Lowry, a former Lord Chief Justice of Northern Ireland. He died in January 1999.

== See also ==
- First women lawyers around the world
