= Paula Nickolds =

British businesswoman (born 1973)

- Born: Paula Margaret Nickolds; February 3, 1973 (age 53)
- Education: University of Southampton
- Occupation: Businesswoman
- Title: Former managing director, John Lewis
- Term: January 2017–January 2020
- Predecessor: Andy Street
- Successor: Pippa Wicks

Paula Margaret Nickolds (born 3 February 1973) is a British businesswoman who has been the chief executive of The White Company since March 2024. From January 2017 until January 2020, she was the managing director of the John Lewis department store chain.

== Early life ==
Nickolds was born on 3 February 1973. Her father, Clive Nickolds, was a senior director at Marks & Spencer, and head of its international operations. She earned a bachelor's degree in history from the University of Southampton, and attended St Helen's School where she spent hours in the pool as a keen member of the swimming team. While she was studying at Southampton, her father relocated to Canada for M&S, and she visited during breaks to work at Holt Renfrew.

== Career ==
In 1994, Nickolds joined John Lewis as a graduate trainee at their Oxford Street flagship store. In January 2017, she succeeded Andy Street as managing director of John Lewis; she thereby became the first woman to hold this position in the company's 153-year history.

She unexpectedly left the company in January 2020, along with two of John Lewis' most senior, long serving executives, just as it looked to navigate a radical overhaul to merge its grocery and department store businesses.

In May 2021, it was announced that she has been appointed by Sainsbury's to run its £7.8bn clothing and general merchandise arm, putting her head-to-head with her former employer John Lewis.

In January 2024, it was announced that she was leaving Sainsbury's to become chief executive at The White Company, starting at the end of March.

== Personal life ==
Nickolds is married to David Morley, a former John Lewis manager, whom she met while working there.
