= Pippa Wicks =

British businesswoman (born 1962)

- Born: 18 December 1962 (age 63)
- Education: University of Oxford
- Occupation: Businesswoman
- Title: Executive Director
- Term: August 2020 - 2023
- Predecessor: Paula Nickolds
- Successor: Peter Ruis

Pippa Wicks (born 18 December 1962) is a British businesswoman, and the former executive director of John Lewis & Partners.

== Personal life ==
Wicks was born on 18 December 1962 to a father employed in marketing at the chemicals company Imperial Chemical Industries, and a mother who was a justice of the peace. During her early teens, her family moved to Buckinghamshire. She attended Lady Verney High School in High Wycombe. She studied zoology at the University of Oxford, and later studied at the London Business School.

She is married and has a son and two stepdaughters.

== Career ==
Wicks has worked for Bain & Company. In 1993, she left Bain to become finance director at Courtaulds Textiles. Wicks later worked for a business education company, Pearson, before moving to consultancy firm AlixPartners. Wicks was later hired by The Co-operative Group as interim chief operating officer. When Wicks joined the Co-operative Group, the company's future was uncertain. At The Co-operative Group, Wicks earned over one million pounds a year. In 2017, Wicks was appointed deputy chief executive officer of The Co-operative Group in a restructure following Richard Pennycook's resignation as CEO. Wicks was an advocate of The Co-operative Group setting up a programme to employ victims of modern slavery, giving them a four-week paid work experience placement. In 2019, whilst Wicks was deputy CEO, Co-op Insurance was merged with Markerstudy Group at a cost of £185 million.

In June 2020, Wicks was announced as the new head of John Lewis & Partners, a British department store which is part of the John Lewis Partnership group. The role has been separated from the previous joint role of head of John Lewis and Waitrose. Wicks took up the position in August 2020, and succeeded Paula Nickolds as head of John Lewis & Partners. At the time of her appointment, she was one of five women on the board of the John Lewis Partnership. Wicks left John Lewis & Partners in February 2023. Wicks was instrumental in the 'ditching' of the organisation's century-old 'Never Knowingly Undersold' pledge. On 5 September 2024 it was announced that John Lewis were bringing back Never Knowingly Undersold.
