= St Helen's School =

Coordinates: 51°37′N 0°25′W

St Helen's School London
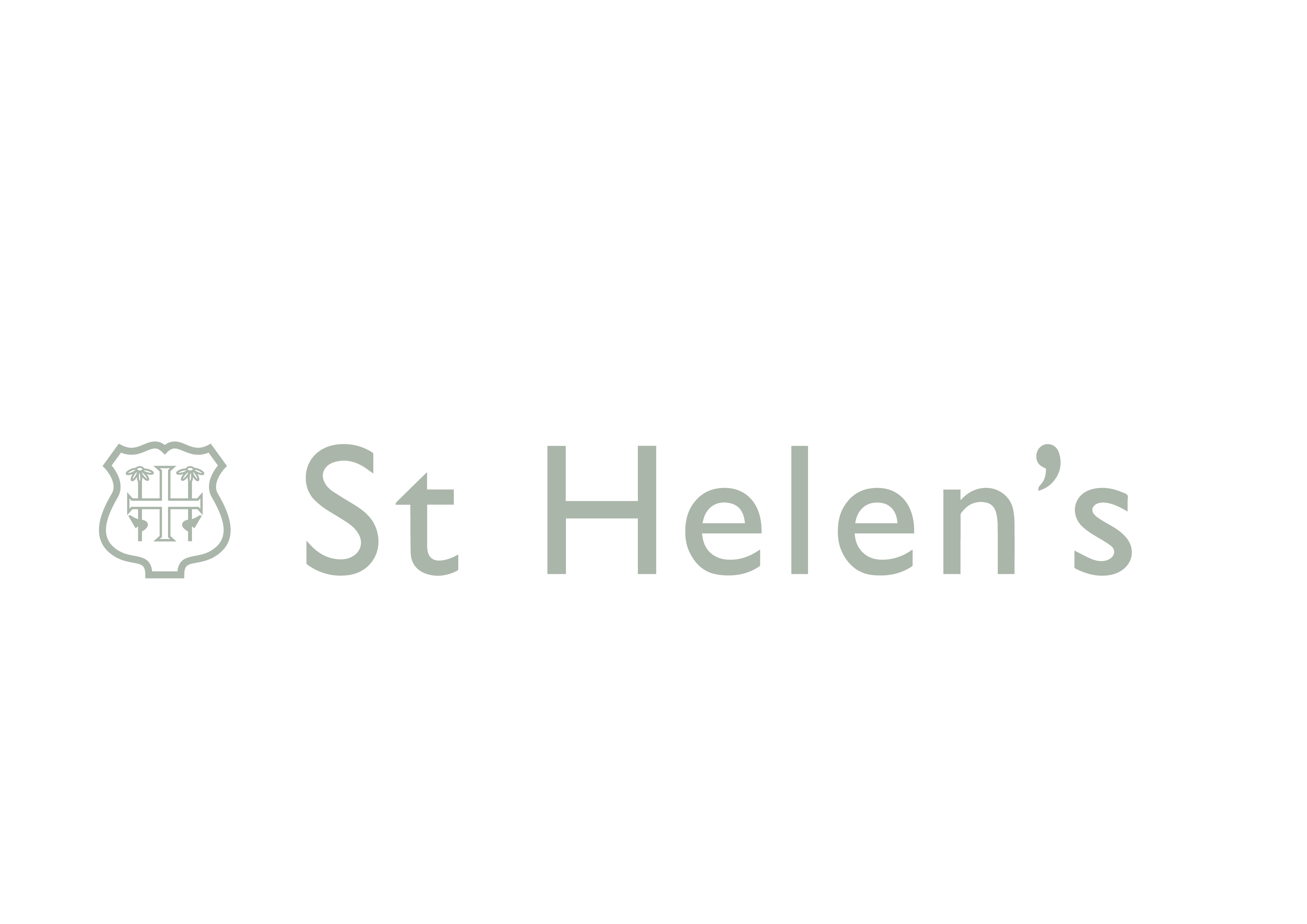

Location
- Eastbury Road; Northwood, HA6 3AS; England

Information
- Type: Private day school
- Motto: "In hoc vincite velut illi crescite" "Conquer by the cross and grow like the daisies" (Literal: "In this [cross] we conquer and in these [daisies] grow.")
- Religious affiliation: Church of England
- Established: 1899
- Founder: May Roland Brown
- Local authority: Hillingdon
- Department for Education URN: 102453 Tables
- Headmistress: Alice Lucas
- Gender: Girls
- Age: 3 to 18
- Houses: Seacole, Kahlo, Bronte, Franklin
- Colour: Green
- Website: http://www.sthelens.london

St Helen's School London is a private day school for girls aged three to eighteen in Northwood, North West London. It is associated with the Merchant Taylors' Company and works in close collaboration with the local Merchant Taylors' School in a range of areas.

== History ==
St Helen's School was founded by May Rowland Brown in 1899. Having been trained as a teacher at Cambridge Training College for Women, she began to teach at Northwood College, which at the time, refused to take in any students that were connected with trade. Whilst still at Northwood College, a group of local businessmen persuaded her to start another school, and at the age of 25, she founded Northwood High School, later named St Helen's School.

== House system ==
The house system was established in 1927 with three houses named Scott, Shackleton and Bruce. Two of the houses were named after Antarctic explorers – Captain Robert Falcon Scott and Sir Ernest Shackleton, with Bruce named after the Himalayan explorer Brig. Gen. Charles Bruce. A fourth house, Bonington, also named after a Himalayan explorer, has since been added.

The houses have now been changed to Seacole (Bruce), Kahlo (Scott), Brontë (Shackleton), and Franklin (Bonington).

Each year the House Cup is awarded to the house with the most points, which can be earned through commendations, Sports Day, House Arts and other achievements.

House	Name Origin	Motto	House Colour
Kahlo	Frieda Kahlo	"Ready Aye Ready"	Red
Bronte	Charlotte Brontë	"Endurance"	Blue
Seacole	Mary Seacole	"Altiora Peto"	Purple
Franklin	Rosalind Franklin	"Laboramus Ut Vincamus"	Yellow

In 1999, to mark the centenary, Junior School adopted a new house system consisting of 3 houses. The Houses, nominated by the Junior School students, were named after pioneering women in history. Later in 2012 the fourth house was added, named after the American female pilot Amelia Earhart.

House	Name Origin	House Colour
Curie	Marie Curie	Orange
Keller	Helen Keller	Turquoise
Nightingale	Florence Nightingale	Magenta
Earhart	Amelia Earhart	Purple

== Curriculum ==
Pupils in Middle School (Years 7–9) follow a broader version of the National Curriculum. Upper School pupils (Years 10–11) take English Language and Literature, Mathematics, the Sciences, and at least one Modern Foreign Language and one Humanity course. Students take both GCSE and IGCSE courses, with core subjects studied at IGCSE. Sixth Formers sit A Levels.

St Helen's has regularly performed well in GCSE and A Levels examination league tables. In 2009 candidates achieved a 100% pass rate, all A*-C grades. In 2010 they achieved a 99% pass rate with 96% receiving all A*-B grades. In 2015, the school achieved some of its best results to date with 53% of entries graded A* and 84% graded A*-A. The pass rate was 99%.

== Notable former pupils ==
Arts and entertainment

- Patricia Hodge, OBE, actress
- Penny Johnson, Director of the Government Art Collection
- Joan Eardley, painter
- Helen Grace, actress
- Rachel Petladwala, actress
- Dame Ingrid Roscoe, art historian

Business

- Paula Nickolds, former managing director of John Lewis

Sport

- Jessica Gordon Brown, Commonwealth Silver Medalist for Olympic Weightlifting

Journalism and media

- Penny Marshall, journalist
- Caroline Daniel, journalist
- Magenta Devine, journalist & TV presenter
- Luisa Baldini, former BBC News correspondent

Law

- Barbara Calvert, barrister and first woman to become a Head of Chambers
- Barbara Mills, former Director of Public Prosecutions

Military

- Daphne Blundell, former Director of the Women's Royal Naval Service
