= Luisa Baldini =

Anglo-Italian presenter

- Born: Luisa Baldini; Tanzania
- Education: St Helen's School, London; Haileybury College, Hertfordshire
- Alma mater: University of Exeter
- Occupations: Journalist, Presenter
- Notable credit(s): News Direct 97.3; EuroNews; Five News; BBC Breakfast; BBC News

Luisa Baldini (born in Tanzania) is an Anglo-Italian presentation and communication expert, previously having worked for BBC News as a deputy royal correspondent among many other assignments.

== Education ==
Baldini spent the first 10 years of her life in Africa, where her Italian father was posted as country manager for Alitalia Airlines. After attending The Banda School, Nairobi and British International School, Cairo she was sent to the UK to boarding schools St Helen's School in Northwood then Haileybury College coeducational in Hertfordshire, followed by the University of Exeter, where she studied modern languages. She gained a post-graduate diploma in broadcast journalism at Falmouth University.

== Life and career ==
Baldini worked as a reporter for London-based rolling news radio station News Direct 97.3FM. She then moved to a pan-European satellite channel in Lyon, France EuroNews, followed by ITN in London, where her first full-time television reporting role was at Five News.

In 2002, she moved to the BBC, first as a reporter to BBC Breakfast, then to the one o'clock news. She also became a dedicated late reporter for the 10 O'Clock News under the editorship of Sir Craig Oliver. Her work also appeared on the BBC News Channel and BBC World News.

Being trilingual (she speaks Italian, English and French), Baldini has been sent to Italy to report on major news stories for BBC News, including the death of the Pope John Paul II, the 2009 L'Aquila earthquake, the Amanda Knox trials concerning the Murder of Meredith Kercher, the resignation of Pope Benedict XVI and the Costa Concordia accident and many more.

In 2004, Otis Ferry contacted Baldini before he and his friends raided the House of Commons in support of the hunting debate. Although Baldini reported it to news editors, the BBC did not act or report it to the police in advance of the incident, causing a furore.

Baldini is married to a former television news executive of ITN, Sky and ITV whom she met at Five News. They have two children. She left the BBC in 2014, moving to New York when her husband joined NBC under Deborah Turness who had been appointed the first female and non-American President. They returned to the UK in 2017.

Baldini's British grandfather was the first career Jewish ambassador, Sir Horace Phillips KCMG. Born in Glasgow to a poor Jewish family with no university education, Phillips became HM ambassador to Indonesia, Saudi Arabia, Turkey, and High Commissioner to Tanzania.
