= Brad Grey =

American film and television producer (1957–2017)

- Born: Brad Alan Grey; December 29, 1957; New York City, U.S.
- Died: May 14, 2017 (aged 59); Los Angeles, California, U.S.
- Education: University at Buffalo
- Occupations: Former Chairman and CEO of Paramount Pictures
- Years active: 1984–2017
- Spouses: Jill Gutterson (m. 1982; div. 2007) Cassandra Huysentruyt (m. 2011)
- Children: 4

Brad Alan Grey (December 29, 1957 – May 14, 2017) was an American television and film producer. He co-founded Brillstein-Grey Entertainment (now Brillstein Entertainment Partners), and afterwards became the chairman and CEO of Paramount Pictures, a position he held from 2005 to 2017. Grey graduated from the University at Buffalo School of Management. Under Grey's leadership, Paramount finished No. 1 in global market share in 2011 and No. 2 domestically in 2008, 2009, and 2010, despite releasing significantly fewer films than its competitors. He also produced eight out of Paramount's 10 top-grossing films of all time after having succeeded Sherry Lansing in 2005.

== Early life ==
Grey was born to a Jewish family in the Bronx, the youngest child of a garment district salesman. He majored in business and communications at the University at Buffalo.

While attending the university, he became a gofer for a young Harvey Weinstein, who was then a concert promoter. The first show Grey produced (at age 20) was a concert by Frank Sinatra at Buffalo's Buffalo Memorial Auditorium in 1978. He traveled to Manhattan on weekends to look for young comics at The Improv. Grey brought comedian Bob Saget to New York, thus making Saget his first client.

== Career ==
=== Talent agent and producer ===
In 1984, Grey met talent manager Bernie Brillstein in San Francisco, California, at a television convention. Having convinced Brillstein that he could deliver fresh talent, he was taken on as a partner, and the Bernie Brillstein Company was rechristened Brillstein-Grey Entertainment. Grey began producing for television in 1986 with the Showtime hit, It's Garry Shandling's Show. In the late 1990s, Shandling sued Grey for breach of duties and related claims. Shandling complained that his TV show lost its best writers and producers when Brad Grey got them deals to do other projects, and that Grey commissioned these other deals, while Shandling did not benefit from them. Grey denied the allegations and countersued, saying the comedian breached his contract on The Larry Sanders Show by failing to produce some episodes and indiscriminately dismissing writers, among other actions. Both suits were settled, avoiding a trial. Shandling did testify about Grey during the 2008 trial of private investigator Anthony Pellicano, who worked on Grey's defense team. The value of the settlement to Shandling was later disputed by attorneys as being either $4 million or $10 million.

In 1996, Brillstein sold his shares of the Brillstein-Grey company to Grey, giving Grey full rein over operations; the company's television unit was subsequently rechristened "Brad Grey Television". Grey produced shows such as Emmy Award-winning The Sopranos and The Wayne Brady Show. Other shows developed in the 1990s under the Brillstein-Grey banner included Good Sports, The Larry Sanders Show, Mr. Show, Real Time with Bill Maher, NewsRadio, The Steve Harvey Show, and Just Shoot Me! Grey also ventured into film by producing the Adam Sandler hit Happy Gilmore.

In 1996, actress Linda Doucett alleged that Grey and Shandling fired her from The Larry Sanders Show after her personal relationship with Shandling ended. Doucett reportedly received a $1 million settlement in this matter in 1997.

In July 2000 - on the day of Scary Movie's opening - Grey and Brillstein-Grey were sued by Bo Zenga and his Boz Productions in what became known as the 'Scary' suit. Zenga, at the time an unknown bit-part actor, "claimed he had an oral agreement with Grey's management firm Brillstein-Grey Entertainment, giving him equal profits on the film". Scary Movie went on to make $278m worldwide.

The pre-trial discovery process "revealed that major parts of Zenga's resume were fabricated. Brillstein-Grey said in a court filing that Zenga presented himself as a successful investment banker who became a prize-winning screenwriter to satisfy his creative urges." "Far from being a successful investment banker, Zenga once filed for personal bankruptcy" and "according to court papers, the only writing award he won was in a phony contest he set up himself." After denying under oath that he knew who owned the company that ran the contest, Bo Zenga recanted a day later, admitting his ownership of the company and "saying he had been 'overmedicated.'" When questioned about "an accusation from his former business partner that he coerced her to lie for him," Zenga "in a highly unusual move for a plaintiff in a film-profits case — asserted his Fifth Amendment right not to answer hundreds of questions." Zenga's suit was thrown out of court for lack of evidence. L.A. Superior Court Judge Robert O'Brien "noted it was only the second time in all his years on the bench that he had granted a non-suit and taken a case away from a jury."

In 2002, Grey formed Plan B with Brad Pitt and Jennifer Aniston, with a first-look deal at Warner Bros. The company produced two films for Warner Bros: Tim Burton's Charlie and the Chocolate Factory with Johnny Depp, and Martin Scorsese's The Departed, starring Leonardo DiCaprio, Matt Damon, and Jack Nicholson. After Pitt and Aniston separated, Grey and Pitt moved the company to Paramount Pictures in 2005.

In May 2006, Zenga "filed a new suit against Grey personally," in which he charged Grey with using notorious private investigator Anthony Pellicano to illegally wiretap and conduct illegal background checks on Zenga during the original case. Grey denied any knowledge, testifying that "his dealings with Pellicano 'all came through Bert Fields' and that 'in every instance' Grey had never been given updates on the investigations by Pellicano." The suit was "dismissed, due to Zenga having lied and to statute of limitations issues." Zenga's appeal continued after Grey's death until being dismissed in December 2017.

=== Paramount Pictures CEO ===
Grey was named chief executive officer of Paramount Pictures Corporation in 2005. In his position, Grey was responsible for overseeing all feature film development and production for films distributed by Paramount Pictures Corporation, including Paramount Pictures, Paramount Vantage, Paramount Classics, Paramount Insurge, MTV Films, and Nickelodeon Movies. He was also responsible for the worldwide business operations for Paramount Pictures International, Paramount Famous Productions, Paramount Home Media Distribution, Paramount Animation, Studio Group and Worldwide Television Distribution.

Among the commercial and critical hit films Paramount produced and/or distributed during Grey's tenure were the Transformers, Paranormal Activity, and Iron Man franchises, Star Trek, How to Train Your Dragon, Shrek the Third, Mission: Impossible III, Mission: Impossible – Ghost Protocol, An Inconvenient Truth, There Will Be Blood, No Country for Old Men, The Curious Case of Benjamin Button, Babel, Shutter Island, Up in the Air, The Fighter, True Grit, The Adventures of Tintin: The Secret of the Unicorn, and Hugo.

During his time as chairman and CEO of Paramount, the studio's films were nominated for dozens of Academy Awards, including 20 in 2011 and 18 in 2012.

After arriving at Paramount in 2005, Chairman and CEO Grey was credited with leading a return to fortune at the box office. He oversaw the creation and revitalization of several major franchises, Transformers: Revenge of the Fallen, Star Trek, and Paranormal Activity, which was made for $15,000 and generated $192 million at the global box office. Paranormal Activity 2 grossed $177 million worldwide, and the third installment in the franchise collected $205.7 million worldwide in 2011. A fourth installment was released in October 2012. The studio's 2011 results included Transformers: Dark of the Moon, which grossed more than $1.1 billion worldwide, and Mission: Impossible – Ghost Protocol, whose $694 million global box office tally makes it the most successful entry in that franchise. Paramount's 2012 slate included The Dictator, which earned $179 million on a $65 million budget.

During this period, Paramount forged productive relationships with top-tier filmmakers and talent including J. J. Abrams, Michael Bay and Martin Scorsese.

In 2011, based on the success of Rango, the studio's first original, computer-animated release, Grey oversaw the launch of a new animation division, Paramount Animation.

The 2010 Paramount slate achieved much success with Shutter Island and True Grit reaching the biggest box office totals in the storied careers of Martin Scorsese and the Coen brothers, respectively. In addition, during Grey's tenure, Paramount launched its own worldwide releasing arm, Paramount Pictures International, and has released acclaimed films such as An Inconvenient Truth, Up in the Air, and There Will Be Blood. The success of Paranormal Activity also led to the creation of a low-budget releasing label, Insurge Pictures, which released Justin Bieber: Never Say Never, which collected nearly $100 million in worldwide box office revenue.

Grey was ousted from Paramount Pictures shortly before his death, a result of a power struggle between his backers and the family of majority owner Sumner Redstone, along with a series of flops that cost the studio $450 million in losses.

== Death ==
Grey died on May 14, 2017, from fourth-stage metastatic lung cancer at his Holmby Hills home in Los Angeles, California. He was 59.

== Philanthropy ==
Grey received an honorary Doctor of Humane Letters degree from SUNY during a visit to Buffalo and UB in 2003. Grey's Board appointments included:

- UCLA's Executive Board for the Medical Sciences
- USC School of Cinema-Television Board of Councilors
- Board of Directors for Project A.L.S.
- NYU's Tisch School of the Arts
- Los Angeles County Museum of Art

== Filmography ==
He was a producer in all films unless otherwise noted.

=== Film ===
Year	Film	Credit	Notes
1990	Opportunity Knocks	Executive producer	
1996	Happy Gilmore	Executive producer	
1996	The Cable Guy	Executive producer	
1996	Bulletproof	Executive producer	
1998	The Replacement Killers		
1998	The Wedding Singer	Executive producer	
1998	Dirty Work	Executive producer	
2000	What Planet Are You From?	Executive producer	
2000	Screwed	Executive producer	
2000	Scary Movie	Executive producer	
2002	City by the Sea		
2003	View from the Top		
2005	Charlie and the Chocolate Factory		
2006	The Departed		
2006	Running with Scissors		
2007	The Assassination of Jesse James by the Coward Robert Ford	Executive producer	Final film as a producer

As writer

Year	Film
1981	The Burning

Miscellaneous crew

Year	Film	Notes
1981	The Burning	Production consultant

Thanks

Year	Film	Role	Notes
2006	Babel	The director wishes to thank	
2008	Taste of Flesh	Very special thanks	Direct-to-video
2010	I'm Still Here	Special thanks	

=== Television ===
Year	Title	Credit	Notes
1984	Garry Shandling: Alone in Vegas		Television special
1986	The Garry Shandling Show: 25th Anniversary Special	Executive producer	Television special
1986−1990	It's Garry Shandling's Show	Executive producer	
1988	Mr. Miller Goes to Washington Starring Dennis Miller	Executive producer	Television special
1988	The Boys	Executive producer	
1989	The 13th Annual Young Comedians Special	Executive producer	Television special
1990	Normal Life	Executive producer	
1990	Don't Try This at Home!	Executive producer	Television film
1990	Dennis Miller: Black and White	Executive producer	Television special
1990	Bob Saget: In the Dream State	Executive producer	Television special
1991	Good Sports	Executive producer	
1992	The Please Watch the Jon Lovitz Special	Executive producer	Television special
1992	The 15th Annual Young Comedians Special	Executive producer	Television special
1992−1998	The Larry Sanders Show	Executive producer	
1993	Live from Washington D.C.: They Shoot HBO Specials, Don't They?	Executive producer	Television special
1995	Dana Carvey: Critics' Choice	Executive producer	Television special
1995−1997	The Jeff Foxworthy Show	Executive producer	
1995−1997	Mr. Show with Bob and David	Executive producer	
1995−1997	The Naked Truth	Executive producer	
1995−1999	NewsRadio	Executive producer	
1996	For Hope	Executive producer	Television film
1996	Mr. Show with Bob and David: Fantastic Newness	Executive producer	Television short
1996−2002	The Steve Harvey Show	Executive producer	
1996−2002	Politically Incorrect	Executive producer	
1997	C-16: FBI	Executive producer	
1997−1998	Alright Already	Executive producer	
1997−2003	Just Shoot Me!	Executive producer	
1998	Mr. Show and the Incredible, Fantastical News Report	Executive producer	Television short
1998	Applewood 911	Executive producer	Television film
1999−2007	The Sopranos	Executive producer	
2000	Sammy	Executive producer	
2001−2002	Pasadena	Executive producer	
2002	In Memoriam: New York City	Executive producer	Documentary
2002	Father Lefty	Executive producer	Television film
2003	My Big Fat Greek Life	Executive producer	
2003	Married to the Kellys	Executive producer	
2003	The Lyon's Den	Executive producer	
2003	Titletown	Executive producer	Television film
2004	Three Sisters: Searching for a Cure	Executive producer	Documentary
2004−2006	Cracking Up	Executive producer	
2005	Jake in Progress	Executive producer	
2005	East of Normal, West of Weird	Executive producer	Television film
2006−2019	Real Time with Bill Maher	Executive producer	

== Awards ==
Award	Year	Work	Category	Ref.
Emmy	2004	The Sopranos	Outstanding Drama Series	
Emmy	2007	The Sopranos	Outstanding Drama Series	
Peabody	1993	The Larry Sanders Show		
Peabody	1998	The Larry Sanders Show		
Peabody	1999	The Sopranos		
Peabody	2000	The Sopranos		
PGA	2000	The Sopranos		
PGA	2005	The Sopranos	Norman Felton Producer of the Year – Episodic	
PGA	2008	The Sopranos	Norman Felton Producer of the Year – Episodic	
