= The Larry Sanders Show =

American television sitcom (1992–1998)

- Genre: Sitcom; Satire
- Created by: Garry Shandling; Dennis Klein
- Starring: Garry Shandling; Jeffrey Tambor; Megan Gallagher; Wallace Langham; Jeremy Piven; Penny Johnson; Linda Doucett; Janeane Garofalo; Rip Torn; Kathryn Harrold; Scott Thompson; Mary Lynn Rajskub
- Music by: Frank Fitzpatrick
- Country of origin: United States
- Original language: English
- No. of seasons: 6
- No. of episodes: 90 (list of episodes)

Production
- Executive producers: Garry Shandling; Brad Grey; Paul Simms; Peter Tolan; Fred Barron
- Cinematography: Peter Smokler; Christian Santiago
- Camera setup: Single-camera
- Running time: 21–26 minutes
- Production companies: Partners with Boundaries Productions; Brillstein-Grey Entertainment; HBO (1992–1995) (seasons 1–4); HBO Original Programming (1996–1998) (seasons 5–6); Columbia Pictures Television

Original release
- Network: HBO
- Release: August 15, 1992 – May 31, 1998

The Larry Sanders Show is an American television sitcom set in the office and studio of a fictional late-night talk show. Created by Garry Shandling and Dennis Klein, the show ran for six seasons and 90 episodes on the HBO cable television network from August 15, 1992, to May 31, 1998.

The show stars Shandling as late night talk show host Larry Sanders, along with Jeffrey Tambor, and Rip Torn and features celebrities playing exaggerated, parodic versions of themselves. The show has its roots in Shandling's stand-up comedy background, his experience as a frequent guest host on The Tonight Show, and his earlier sitcom, It's Garry Shandling's Show. The program has had a marked and long-lasting influence on HBO as well as on television shows in the United States and United Kingdom, particularly shows like Curb Your Enthusiasm (which also aired on the same network), 30 Rock, and The Office. The supporting cast includes Janeane Garofalo, Wallace Langham, Penny Johnson, Linda Doucett, Scott Thompson, and Jeremy Piven.

The show received universal critical acclaim and is often regarded as an influential and landmark series. In 2010, it ranked 38 on TV Guide's 50 Greatest TV Shows of All Time, and was also included in Time magazine's 2007 list of the "100 Best TV Shows of All Time". The show won 24 major awards, including three Primetime Emmy Awards, five CableACE Awards, four American Comedy Awards, two British Comedy Awards, two Peabody Awards, a BAFTA Award and a Satellite Award. It also received 86 nominations, including 56 Primetime Emmy Awards nominations, five Directors Guild of America nominations, six Writers Guild of America nominations, six American Comedy Awards nominations, three Golden Globe nominations, three Satellite Awards nominations and a GLAAD Award nomination.

== Premise ==
=== Origins ===
From the mid-1980s to the late 1990s, a stream of American stand-up comedians found success in sitcoms on broadcast network television, including Bill Cosby, Roseanne Barr, Richard Lewis, Jerry Seinfeld, Tim Allen, Paul Reiser, Tom Arnold, Brett Butler, Ellen DeGeneres, Drew Carey, Kevin Brennan, and Ray Romano. Garry Shandling took a slightly different path with the cable network sitcoms The Larry Sanders Show and its forerunner It's Garry Shandling's Show.

In It's Garry Shandling's Show, Shandling makes use of the George Burns technique of directly addressing the audience. He speaks to the studio and home audiences as well as the other actors, often in quick succession. In both shows celebrity guests appear as themselves and Shandling essentially plays himself: a star of a television show and stand-up comedian with a distinctive "comic persona and rhythm". Shandling said, in an interview with Entertainment Weekly, "The idea for doing something about a talk show host actually came out of an It's Garry Shandling's Show episode in which I was the guest on an LA morning show ... I thought I could make the talk show look very real so the audience would buy that part and then slowly suck them into the realities of life once Larry goes behind the curtain."

In 1981, Shandling performed his first appearance doing a stand-up routine on The Tonight Show. He subsequently became a regular guest, particularly being able to appear on short notice to fill unexpected gaps in the Carson show's schedule. He also began appearing as a guest host and, in 1986, replaced Joan Rivers as the "permanent guest host" when Carson was away from the show for vacation or illness. Shandling was considered a possible, although unlikely, successor to Johnny Carson. After Jay Leno replaced Carson in 1992, Shandling was offered his own late-night (1 a.m.) talk show but preferred instead to create "a show about a talk-show", which became The Larry Sanders Show. The series has similarities to The Player, The King of Comedy and classic Hollywood back-stage musicals with their "let's put on a show" theme, but the links to The Tonight Show are so strong it verges on parody. Alex Pareene commented "Shandling turned down hosting a network late night show to do a brilliant cult hit sitcom about a version of himself who took the deal."

=== Plot ===
The show follows the production of a fictional late-night talk show The Larry Sanders Show. It chronicles the daily life of host Larry (Garry Shandling), producer Arthur "Artie" (Rip Torn), sidekick Hank Kingsley (Jeffrey Tambor) and their interaction with celebrity guests, the network and others. Episodes focus on the professional and personal lives of the principal characters, with most focusing on Larry. Ancillary characters are also featured, among them the writers Phil (Wallace Langham) and Jerry (Jeremy Piven), talent bookers Paula (Janeane Garofalo) and Mary Lou (Mary Lynn Rajskub) and the personal assistants Beverly, Darlene, and Brian. Larry's wife, ex-wife, and girlfriends are frequent sources of conflict, and his home is a secondary location for the show.

Episodes often focus on power dynamics. Supporting characters commonly struggle for status or power, both within the structure of the show's staff as well as within the broader Hollywood community. These struggles almost always end with the character receiving their comeuppance from Larry, Artie, or one of the episode's guest stars.

A typical early episode opens to the titles with the sound of Hank's audience warm-up routine in the background. This is followed by the talk show's titles and an excerpt from Larry's monologue. Episodes vary after this, sometimes continuing with the studio recording, but often cutting to a back-stage shot or to the production offices.

=== Writing and production ===
The Larry Sanders Show is a satire on show business that mixes fact with fiction. It featured real-life celebrity guests as they performed on the talk show and as they appeared behind the scenes. For example, in the final episode Larry interviews Sean Penn who, once they cut to a commercial break, gossips freely about Shandling's acting, insecurity, and behavior towards Penn's wife (Robin Wright) on the set of Hurlyburly, in which all three appear. The scripts often shocked by appearing to show the guests’ malice, or the difference between their public and private personas.

Profanities are used on the show, although not gratuitously, with the writers taking advantage of the freedom allowed by HBO as a subscription cable service. It paved the way for subsequent HBO shows such as Oz, The Sopranos, and Deadwood. According to Peter Tolan, early episodes were also recorded with language suitable for broadcast syndication until midway through the second season, when the actors resisted shooting the extra takes.

The show used both videotape and film. The behind the scenes footage was shot on film, often using hand-held cameras, in a documentary style. Four video cameras recorded the show-within-a-show which gives a brighter, less grainy picture and helps distinguish the talk show from the back-stage scenes. The talk show was staged with realistic music, lighting and set design. It was recorded in front of an actual live studio audience during the first season and then occasionally during later episodes.

The show had a few catchphrases used throughout its entire run. The most common was "Hey now," a phrase Hank repeats in the opening credits of the fictional talk show and whenever he greets someone (though it was intellectual property of the network; season 3, episode 1, "Montana"). It mirrors the "Hi-yo" catchphrase used by Ed McMahon (sidekick on The Tonight Show), upon whom Hank Kingsley was based. In season 1 episode 10, "The Party", Hank says: "No, no, no. You see, when I was a kid, I used to say 'hey,' and then later I said 'now,' but I never put them together until much later." Radio host Howard Stern later adopted “Hey now!” as his on-air greeting, stating that it was a deliberate homage to Hank Kingsley and the series. In 2007, Nickelodeon's TV Land ranked "Hey Now" as the 87th Best Television catchphrase. "No flipping" is a phrase Larry uses to go to commercial breaks, encouraging the viewer audience not to change to another channel (which was considered public domain; season 3, episode 1, "Montana"). At the end of the season 2, (episode 17, "New York or LA"): Larry says: "You may feel free to flip" upon deciding at the end of a talk show scene to retire and relocate to Montana. During the series finale, the last thing Larry says on his talk show is, "You may now flip."

== Episodes ==
Season	Episodes	Originally released	
Season	Episodes	First released	Last released
1	13	August 15, 1992	November 7, 1992
2	18	June 2, 1993	September 29, 1993
3	17	June 22, 1994	October 12, 1994
4	17	July 19, 1995	November 22, 1995
5	13	November 13, 1996	February 26, 1997
6	12	March 15, 1998	May 31, 1998

=== Season 1 ===
The first season premiered on August 15, 1992, and ended on November 7, 1992, and was an immediate success. Story arcs include the breakdown of Larry's relationship with his second wife Jeannie (Megan Gallagher) and his abuse of Excedrin tablets.

=== Season 2 ===
The second season premiered on June 2, 1993, and ended on September 29, 1993. The story arcs include Larry’s beginning a new relationship with his ex-wife Francine (Kathryn Harrold) and Hank’s investing all his money in a street-level revolving restaurant.

Jeremy Piven grew tired of playing the character Jerry, head writer of the fictional talk show, because his character was not given much of a background. He was written out during the episode "Larry's Birthday", where Artie fired Jerry because of his behavior. Eventually, Wallace Langham (Phil) replaced him as the talk show's head writer. Some popular episodes of the season were: "Larry's Agent", in which Larry tries to fire his agent; "Broadcast Nudes", in which Hank wants Darlene (Linda Doucett) to pose nude in Playboy magazine (Doucett actually appeared in the September 1993 edition of the magazine); "Larry's Birthday" in which Larry doesn't want anyone throwing a party for his birthday; "The Grand Opening", in which Hank tries to promote his new restaurant; "Off Camera", in which Larry has to deal with all the stress that Artie suffers every show and the season finale "L.A. or N.Y?", in which Larry leaves the talk show and moves to Montana, to protest the network's desire to shift the talk show's base from L.A. to New York.

=== Season 3 ===
The season premiered on July 22, 1994, and ended on October 12, 1994. Some of the most popular episodes of the season were: "Montana", in which the talk show gets back on the air after Larry discovers that life in Montana is not to his liking; "You're Having My Baby", in which a woman claims that she is having Larry's baby; "Hank's Night in the Sun", in which Hank fulfills his dream of becoming guest host; "The Mr. Sharon Stone Show", which Larry dates Sharon Stone and finds out what it means to be the less famous member of a show business couple; and the season finale "End of the Season" in which Larry gets engaged to Roseanne Barr.

=== Season 4 ===
The season premiered on July 19, 1995, and ended on November 22, 1995. Linda Doucett (Darlene) left the show at the end of season three. She had been in a six-year relationship with Shandling, but the couple became estranged between seasons and she was written out of the show. Doucett filed a lawsuit against Shandling and producer Brad Grey's company for sexual harassment and wrongful termination, which was settled out of court for $1 million. She was replaced as Hank's assistant by Scott Thompson (Brian). Some of the most popular episodes of the season included: "Roseanne's Return", in which Larry has to face Roseanne Barr after their engagement broke off; "Arthur After Hours", in which it is revealed what Artie does after an unsuccessful broadcast; "Jeannie's Visit", in which Larry's ex-wife visits the talk show; "Hank's Sex Tape", in which Hank becomes incensed when Phil circulates a tape of him having sex with two women; and the season finale "Larry's On Vacation", in which Sandra Bernhard tries to take over the talk show.

=== Season 5 ===
The season premiered November 13, 1996, and ended on February 26, 1997. Janeane Garofalo decided to leave due to decreasing screen time for her character Paula, the talk show's talent booker. Mary Lynn Rajskub (Mary Lou, Paula's assistant) replaced her as booker. Jon Stewart became a frequent guest who threatened to replace Larry on the talk show. Some of the most famous episodes of the series were made in this season: "Everybody Loves Larry", in which Larry starts suspecting that David Duchovny has sexual feelings for him; "My Name is Asher Kingsley", in which Hank explores his Jewish roots; "Ellen, or Isn't She?", in which Larry and Artie try to find out if Ellen DeGeneres is really a lesbian; "The New Writer", in which Wendy (Sarah Silverman) begins working as a writer, much to Phil's dismay; "The Book", in which Larry writes an autobiography; "Pain Equals Funny", in which Paula leaves the show; and the season finale, "Larry's New Love", in which Hank is afraid the network is trying to replace him.

=== Season 6 ===
The season premiered on March 15, 1998, and ended on May 31, 1998. Shandling decided to make this the final season in part because of his high workload on the show. The main story arc is the increasing pressure from the network to aim for a younger audience that results in Larry deciding to leave the talk show.

Most of the changes to the show occurred offscreen this season. All of the show's writers left except Shandling, Tolan, and Apatow, and a new writing staff was hired. Shandling's relationship with his manager, Brad Grey, had broken down and in January 1998, Shandling filed a lawsuit for $100 million against Grey. In an interview with The New York Times, Shandling said "We had a situation in which the writers were leaving the show for other Brillstein-Grey shows, which became part of the issue of a lawsuit". (The suit was settled out of court for $10 million.) Todd Holland, who directed more than 48 episodes of the show, only directed two of the sixth season. This season was also markedly less comedic than earlier ones. Sid, the cue card guy at the talk show, commits suicide in the episode "I Buried Sid".

Some of the most popular episodes of the season were: "Another List", in which the network threatens to replace Larry with Jon Stewart unless he makes some changes; "The Beginning of the End", in which the talk show gets a new creative consultant who wants to make big changes; "Adolf Hankler", in which Hank has to play Adolf Hitler, while Larry is on vacation and Jon Stewart guest hosts; "Beverly's Secret", in which Beverly (Penny Johnson) tries to tell the father that she's pregnant; "Putting the 'Gay' Back in Litigation", in which Brian sues Phil and the talk show for sexual harassment; and the series finale "Flip", in which the cast gets ready for their final broadcast and Larry and Artie deal with Hank and the emotions of the crew.

The finale was written by Shandling and Tolan. It was directed by Holland with a running time of 53 minutes. It aired on May 31, 16 days after the finale of Seinfeld, and was watched by 2.5 million viewers, which was a significant number for HBO. The finale got very positive reviews from critics, especially in comparison to Seinfeld's series finale. Coincidentally, Jerry Seinfeld appears as himself in the Larry Sanders finale. Other guests in the finale included Warren Beatty, Jim Carrey and Sean Penn.

== Cast and characters ==
=== Main characters ===
The following is a list of cast and characters who regularly appeared in one or more seasons of the show.

- Garry Shandling as Larry Sanders, the eponymous talk show host
- Rip Torn as Arthur ("Artie"), the talk show's producer
- Jeffrey Tambor as Hank Kingsley, Larry's sidekick
- Penny Johnson as Beverly, Larry's personal assistant
- Janeane Garofalo as Paula, talent booker (seasons 1–5)
- Mary Lynn Rajskub as Mary Lou, talent booker (seasons 5–6)
- Jeremy Piven as Jerry, head writer (seasons 1–2)
- Wallace Langham as Phil, writer/head writer
- Linda Doucett as Darlene, Hank's personal assistant (seasons 1–3)
- Scott Thompson as Brian, Hank's personal assistant (seasons 4–6)
- Megan Gallagher as Jeannie, Larry's wife (season 1)
- Kathryn Harrold as Francine, Larry's ex-wife (season 2)
- Deborah May as Melanie Parrish, network executive
- Bob Odenkirk as Stevie Grant, Larry's agent
- Sid Newman as Sid, Cue-card guy (various episodes)
- Phil Leeds as Sid, Hank's agent

=== Guests ===
The following is a list of some of the celebrity guests who appeared on the show.

- Kip Addotta
- Jason Alexander
- Tim Allen
- Jennifer Aniston
- Tom Arnold
- Elizabeth Ashley
- Alec Baldwin
- Daniel Baldwin
- Roseanne Barr
- Drew Barrymore
- Warren Beatty
- Beck
- Ed Begley Jr.
- James Belushi
- Richard Belzer
- Ben Folds Five
- Butthole Surfers
- Sandra Bernhard
- Corbin Bernsen
- Clint Black
- Eric Bogosian
- Michael Bolton
- Terry Bradshaw
- Dr. Joyce Brothers
- Carol Burnett
- T Bone Burnett
- Brett Butler
- Drew Carey
- Jim Carrey
- Carrot Top
- Dana Carvey
- Jeff Cesario
- Dave Chappelle
- Chevy Chase
- Shawn Colvin
- Ray Combs
- Tim Conway
- Bob Costas
- Elvis Costello
- Courteney Cox
- Norm Crosby
- Billy Crystal
- Fred de Cordova
- Ellen DeGeneres
- Dana Delany
- Danny DeVito
- Laura Dern
- Angie Dickinson
- Illeana Douglas
- David Duchovny
- Peter Falk
- Chris Farley
- Farrah Fawcett
- Wayne Federman
- Sally Field
- Harvey Fierstein
- Bridget Fonda
- George Foreman
- Jeff Foxworthy
- Al Franken
- Daisy Fuentes
- Jennie Garth
- Gina Gershon
- Jeff Goldblum
- Bobcat Goldthwait
- Jim Gray
- Rosey Grier
- Mary Gross
- Phil Hartman
- Colin Hay
- Robert Hays
- Hugh Hefner
- Earl Holliman
- Helen Hunt
- Kathy Ireland
- Chris Isaak
- Jake Johannsen
- Kristen Johnston
- Jonathan Katz
- Gary Kemp
- Andy Kindler
- Greg Kinnear
- Larry King
- Bruno Kirby
- Heidi Klum
- Kris Kristofferson
- k.d. lang
- Eriq La Salle
- Laura Leighton
- Jay Leno
- Sugar Ray Leonard
- David Letterman
- Barry Levinson
- Richard Lewis
- Wendy Liebman
- Warren Littlefield
- Los Lobos
- Lori Loughlin
- Jon Lovitz
- Rob Lowe
- Julianna Margulies
- Norm Macdonald
- Bill Maher
- Marlee Matlin
- Ed McMahon
- Larry Miller
- Rita Moreno
- Martin Mull
- Kevin Nealon
- Tommy Newsom
- Maureen O'Boyle
- Pat O'Brien
- Rosie O'Donnell
- Catherine O'Hara
- Ryan O'Neal
- Donny Osmond
- Sarah Jessica Parker
- Mandy Patinkin
- Tatjana Patitz
- David Paymer
- Sean Penn
- Bernadette Peters
- Tom Petty
- Regis Philbin
- Porno for Pyros
- Tom Poston
- Victoria Principal
- Charles Nelson Reilly
- Carl Reiner
- Rob Reiner
- Burt Reynolds
- Michael Richards
- Don Rickles
- John Ritter
- Colin Quinn
- Mimi Rogers
- Wayne Rogers
- Winona Ryder
- Bob Saget
- Pat Sajak
- Adam Sandler
- George Segal
- Jerry Seinfeld
- Doc Severinsen
- Tom Shales
- William Shatner
- Nicollette Sheridan
- Brooke Shields
- Sarah Silverman
- Pauly Shore
- Richard Simmons
- Gene Siskel
- Tom Snyder
- Suzanne Somers
- David Spade
- John Stamos
- Gloria Steinem
- Howard Stern
- Shadoe Stevens
- Jon Stewart
- Ben Stiller
- Jerry Stiller
- Sting
- Sharon Stone
- Dave Thomas
- Lea Thompson
- Alex Trebek
- Vince Vaughn
- Hervé Villechaize
- Jimmie Walker
- David Warner
- George Wendt
- Paul Westerberg
- Andy Williams
- Robin Williams
- Henry Winkler
- Steven Wright
- Wu-Tang Clan
- Noah Wyle
- Warren Zevon

In a commentary on the season one DVD, Shandling says the guests were invariably happy to parody their media images and generally shared the same sense of humor as himself and the other writers.

== Crew ==
=== Directors ===
The show had a total of thirteen directors. Ken Kwapis directed most of the first season, including the pilot, and contributed to the visual style of the show. (He later went on to direct episodes of The Office, also including the pilot, using a "mockumentary" approach.) Todd Holland directed 51 episodes spanning all six seasons. Shandling directed three episodes of the final season. Acting coach Roy London directed two episodes and received a "Special Thanks" credit at the end of every episode for his influence on the show. The show received one Emmy Award for directing. It went to Holland for the series finale "Flip".

=== Writers ===
More than 40 writers wrote episodes of the show. Shandling and Tolan were the head writers for the entire six-season run. Shandling and Dennis Klein wrote the pilot episode of the show. Shandling wrote 38, while Tolan wrote 23 episodes. Shandling and Tolan received an Emmy Award for writing the series finale "Flip". Other writers on the show were Maya Forbes, Paul Simms, Judd Apatow, John Markus, John Riggi, Jon Vitti, Chris Thompson, Drake Sather, Molly Newman, Lester Lewis, Steven Levitan, Becky Hartman Edwards and Jeff Cesario.

== Reception ==
=== Critical reaction ===
After the show ended, the New York Post called it "one of the greatest achievements in television." LA Weekly deemed it "very funny." Time said it was "the closest sitcom ever came to perfect pitch." The Washington Post called the show "brutally and blatantly hilarious" and USA Today gave it four stars.

Many critics called it one of the greatest television shows of all time. On the review aggregator website Rotten Tomatoes, the first season holds a score of 100% based on 23 critics' reviews. The consensus reads: "The genre-bending satire of The Larry Sanders Show gives viewers a surreal look at the inner workings of late night television." Metacritic, which uses a weighted average, gives the show a score of 95 out of 100 based on 69 critic reviews, indicating "universal acclaim". Doug Elfman from the Chicago Sun-Times said "It is simply one of the best sitcoms ever." Ivan Morales calls it "the greatest HBO sitcom of all time." Brooke Allen in the New York Times called it "a comedy series so funny and risque as to make Seinfeld look positively bland". Mark Monahan in The Telegraph called it "very close indeed to comic perfection."

=== Influence ===
The Larry Sanders Show has been influential. It helped establish HBO's reputation for quality shows, leading to Sex and the City, The Sopranos, The Wire and Deadwood. The show influenced subsequent series with satirical backstage show business and celebrity culture themes, such as 30 Rock, Kathy Griffin: My Life on the D-List, The Showbiz Show with David Spade, Extras, Action, and Studio 60 on the Sunset Strip.

The show's most significant innovation is in celebrities playing themselves. It was followed in its use of celebrity guests, its lack of laugh track, and its comedy of embarrassment by Curb Your Enthusiasm, The Office and Arrested Development. Shandling's performance is a precursor to Larry David's in Curb Your Enthusiasm and Ricky Gervais (The Office, Extras) as David Brent. Gervais said in Variety that he was heavily influenced by the show and that "It taught me that flawed characters can be compulsive viewing – seeing them squirm and get their comeuppance." Armando Iannucci said that his political satire The Thick of It strove to mix comedy and authenticity in a similar manner to The Larry Sanders Show.

Matt Zoller Seitz wrote in Time Out Los Angeles that it introduced to television the cinematic technique of "walk and talk" where the camera follows the actors as they move around the offices in conversation. This later became an important part of the style of The West Wing and ER. The show can also be seen as a distorted example of reality television because the portrayal of the talk show production is so convincing. According to Andrew Pulver in The Guardian, "This is where it all began. The whole postmodernist, self-reflexive fact-fiction sitcom thing."

=== Awards and honors ===
Award	Category	Recipient
American Comedy Awards 1994	Funniest Supporting Male in a TV Series	Rip Torn
American Comedy Awards 1998	Funniest Male Performance in a TV Series	Garry Shandling
American Comedy Awards 1999	Funniest Male Guest Appearance on a TV Series	David Duchovny
American Comedy Awards 1999	Funniest Female Guest Appearance on a TV Series	Ellen DeGeneres
British Comedy Awards 1997	Best International Comedy Show	
British Comedy Awards 1999	Best International Comedy Show	
BAFTA Awards 1999	Outstanding International Program	Garry Shandling
CableACE Awards 1993	Outstanding Comedy Series	
CableACE Awards 1994	Outstanding Comedy Series	
CableACE Awards 1995	Outstanding Comedy Series	
CableACE Awards 1996	Outstanding Comedy Series	
Emmy Awards 1998	Outstanding Writing in a Comedy Series	Peter Tolan & Garry Shandling (for "Flip")
Emmy Awards 1998	Outstanding Directing in a Comedy Series	Todd Holland (for "Flip")
Emmy Awards 1996	Outstanding Supporting Actor in a Comedy Series	Rip Torn
Peabody Awards 1998	Area of Excellence	"Flip"
Peabody Awards 1993	Area of Excellence	The Larry Sanders Show
Rose d'Or 1997	Sitcom	
Satellite Awards 1997	Best Television Series – Comedy or Musical	
Television Critics Association Awards 1997	Outstanding Achievement in Comedy	
Television Critics Association Awards 1998	Outstanding Achievement in Comedy	

==== BAFTA Television Awards ====
- 1998: Best International Programme or Series (won)

==== Directors Guild of America (DGA) ====
- 1994: Outstanding Directing – Comedy Series (Todd Holland for "The Mr. Sharon Stone Show", nominated)
- 1995: Outstanding Directing – Comedy Series (Holland for "Arthur After Hours", nominated)
- 1996: Outstanding Directing – Comedy Series (Holland for "Everybody Loves Larry", nominated)
- 1996: Outstanding Directing – Comedy Series (Alan Myerson for "Ellen, Or Isn't She", nominated)
- 1998: Outstanding Directing – Comedy Series (Holland for "Flip", nominated)

==== GLAAD Media Awards ====
- 1996: Outstanding Series – Comedy (nominated)

==== Golden Globe Awards ====
- 1994: Best Actor – Musical or Comedy Series (Garry Shandling for playing "Larry Sanders", nominated)
- 1995: Best Actor – Musical or Comedy Series (Shandling, nominated)
- 1996: Best Series – Musical or Comedy (nominated)

==== Image Awards ====
- 1997: Outstanding Supporting Actress – Comedy Series (Penny Johnson for playing "Beverly Barnes", nominated)

==== Satellite Awards ====
- 1996: Best Actor – Musical or Comedy Series (Garry Shandling for playing "Larry Sanders", nominated)
- 1996: Best Actor – Musical or Comedy Series (Rip Torn for playing "Arthur", nominated)
- 1996: Best Series – Musical or Comedy (won)
- 1997: Best Actor – Musical or Comedy Series (Shandling, nominated)
- 1997: Best Series – Musical or Comedy (nominated)

==== Writers Guild of America (WGA) ====
- 1995: Best Writing – Episodic Comedy (Garry Shandling for "Roseanne's Return", nominated)
- 1995: Best Writing – Episodic Comedy (John Riggi for "Hank's New Assistant", nominated)
- 1995: Best Writing – Episodic Comedy (Peter Tolan for "Arthur After Hours", nominated)
- 1996: Best Writing – Episodic Comedy (Tolan for "Eight", nominated)
- 1997: Best Writing – Episodic Comedy (Shandling for "Ellen, Or Isn't She?", nominated)
- 1997: Best Writing – Episodic Comedy (Maya Forbes for "The Book", nominated)

==== Other honors ====
After the show ended, it came to be considered one of the finest TV shows of all time. The biggest honor it received was a spot on Time magazine's 100 Greatest Shows of All Time. In 2008, Entertainment Weekly ranked The Larry Sanders Show the 28th Greatest Show of the past 25 years. Also, TV Guide named it the 38th Greatest Show of All Time, the only HBO comedy to make it to the list. During its six-year run, The Larry Sanders Show won 24 awards including three Emmy awards. In 1997, the episode "Everybody Loves Larry" was ranked 39 on TV Guide's 100 Greatest Episodes of All Time. In 2013, TV Guide ranked it No. 56 on its list of the 60 Best Series of All Time and the Writers Guild of America ranked it No. 20 on their list of the 101 Best Written TV Series.

== Home media ==
In 2000, The Larry Sanders Show: The Best Episodes was released by Sony Pictures UK in Region 2. The compilation contains the episodes: "Montana" (Robin Williams); "Hank's Sex Tape" (Henry Winkler, Norm Macdonald); "Larry's Big Idea" (Courteney Cox, David Letterman); "I Was a Teenage Lesbian" (Brett Butler). Also included are two first-season episodes, "The Guest Host" and "The Talk Show", as well as the second-season episode, "The List" which was left out of the American cable syndication package offered to Bravo.

On February 26, 2002, Sony Pictures Home Entertainment released the complete first season on DVD in Region 1.

On April 17, 2007, Sony Pictures Home Entertainment released a best-of compilation featuring episodes from all six seasons entitled Not Just the Best of the Larry Sanders Show. The 4-disc DVD set includes 23 episodes and eight hours of interviews with members of the cast and guests including Sharon Stone, Jon Stewart, Tom Petty, Judd Apatow, Alec Baldwin, and David Duchovny.

On November 2, 2010, Shout! Factory released The Larry Sanders Show: The Complete Series on DVD in Region 1 (USA). The 17-disc set features extensive bonus features including featurettes, commentaries & outtakes. Shout! Factory has also released separate releases for seasons 2 & 3.

On August 27, 2013, it was announced that Mill Creek Entertainment had acquired the rights to various television series from the Sony Pictures library including The Larry Sanders Show. They subsequently re-released the first two seasons on June 24, 2014.

On May 19, 2015, Mill Creek re-released The Larry Sanders Show: The Complete Series on DVD.

As of 2025, this show is currently available on HBO Max.

== Books ==
- Confessions of a Late-night Talk-show Host: The Autobiography of Larry Sanders was written in-character as Larry Sanders by Shandling with David Rensin. It was released October 4, 1999, and was the topic of season five's episode "The Book".
