= Grandparents' Association =

Charitable organization in the United Kingdom

- Founded: 1987
- Type: Family charity
- Purpose: Keeping grandparents connected with their grandchildren
- Region served: United Kingdom
- Website: www.grandparents-association.org.uk

The Grandparents' Association is a charitable organization in the United Kingdom that helps grandparents keep in touch with their grandchildren following divorce or separation of the grandchildren's parents. Grandparents in the United Kingdom have no inherent legal right to see their grandchildren. The association was launched in 1987 by a group of grandparents whose grandchildren had been put into foster care or adopted from foster care, or were not allowed any contact with their grandparents.

In contrast, a difficult or disrupted grandparent–parent relationship can threaten proximity of grandparents to grandchildren, contact, involvement and fulfilment of a satisfying grandparental role (Ferguson et al., 2004; Lavers & SonugaBarke, 1997). If (as is usually the case) the children reside with their mother, then paternal grandparents may have to ‘tread carefully’ in obtaining access to their grandchildren; and it can be denied. The consequences of unwanted loss of contact with grandchildren can be devastating. Drew and Smith (2002) sampled grandparents who were members of support groups such as the Grandparents Association; after loss of contact with their grandchildren due to parental divorce, grandparents reported symptoms of bereavement and negative effects on their physical and emotional health (more so than with separation just arising from geographical distance). The hope of reunion with their grandchildren, while not totally unrealistic, makes it difficult to work through the grief process.

== Sources ==
- Ferguson, N., Douglas, G., Lowe, N. et al. (2004). Grandparenting in divorced families. Bristol: Policy Press.
- Drew, Linda M., and Merril Silverstein. "Grandparents' psychological well-being after loss of contact with their grandchildren." Journal of family psychology 21.3 (2007): 372.
