= Penny Johnson =

Director of UK Government Art Collection

Penelope Jane Johnson CBE (born 23 June 1956) was Director of the Government Art Collection from 1997 to 2022. In 2023 she was a trustee of the Bridget Riley Art Foundation, and was a judge for the Rugby Open 23 exhibition.

She was educated at St. Helen's School, the University of East Anglia (BA, 1978) and the University of Manchester. She was made a CBE in the 2010 New Year Honours.

Before taking up the post at the Government Art Collection she had worked in museums and galleries including the Towner Art Gallery and Museum, Eastbourne and Stoke-on-Trent City Museum and Art Gallery,

== Selected publications ==
- Johnson, Penny (2011). Art, power, diplomacy: Government art collection the untold story. London: Scala publ. ISBN 978-1857596915.
