= List of The Larry Sanders Show episodes =

The American sitcom television series The Larry Sanders Show, starring Garry Shandling, premiered on HBO on August 15, 1992, and aired its series finale on May 31, 1998. Six seasons and 90 episodes were filmed in total. The complete series is available on Region 1 DVD, released by Shout Factory, and seasons 1 and 2 are available on Region 2, released by Sony/Mediumrare. Various compilations are also available worldwide.

Shortly after Garry Shandling's death, HBO announced it had earlier completed a deal with Shandling to make the series available on their streaming services.

This list is ordered by the episodes' original air dates.

== Series overview ==
Season	Episodes	Originally released	
Season	Episodes	First released	Last released
1	13	August 15, 1992	November 7, 1992
2	18	June 2, 1993	September 29, 1993
3	17	June 22, 1994	October 12, 1994
4	17	July 19, 1995	November 22, 1995
5	13	November 13, 1996	February 26, 1997
6	12	March 15, 1998	May 31, 1998

== Episodes ==
=== Season 1 (1992) ===
No. overall	No. in season	Title	Directed by	Written by	Original release date	Prod. code
1	1	"What Have You Done for Me Lately?" "The Garden Weasel"	Ken Kwapis	Peter Tolan	August 15, 1992	104
The network presses Larry to do commercials for the Garden Weasel during his show. He initially refuses but later relents when his budget is threatened. When he tries to inject humor into the spots or rope Hank into doing them together, the higher-ups are furious but Artie tells them that from now on, they won't be interacting with Larry but him instead. The show's guest is Robert Hays.
2	2	"The Promise"	Ken Kwapis	Joe Toplyn	August 22, 1992	105
Larry is unhappy that David Spade is appearing on The Tonight Show with Jay Leno after Larry has used his show to promote his career, plus he uses the same material that he told Larry he was going to use. Larry asks his colleagues if he did the right thing by kicking him off the show and goes back and forth depending on whose advice he hears, finally relenting and letting the comedian do his set after another guest cancels at the last minute. Guests include Dana Delany, William Shatner, and David Spade.
3	3	"The Spiders Episode"	Ken Kwapis	Garry Shandling & Rosie Shuster and Paul Simms & Peter Tolan	August 29, 1992	106
Larry has a "bug man" scheduled for his show but his arachnophobia makes it tense and this tension also plays out in his married life. He gets Artie to trick Hank into agreeing to it but both of them get cold feet on camera and end up ruining the sketch, embarrassing his guests, and killing $75,000 of spiders. Guests include Carol Burnett, Steve Duchesne, Steven R. Kutcher, and Jon Lovitz.
4	4	"Guest Host"	Todd Holland	Garry Shandling and Paul Simms	September 5, 1992	109
Larry takes a week-long vacation and taps Dana Carvey to guest host the show. Hank is upset and wants his own shot at guest hosting. Larry also gets jealous when his wife shows how much she admires Carvey. CBS offers Carvey his own late night show and this infuriates Larry who feels it's a betrayal of their friendship. Guests include Dana Carvey and Hervé Villechaize.
5	5	"The New Producer"	Todd Holland	Story by : Garry Shandling; Teleplay by : Dick Blasucci & Paul Simms and Howard Gewirtz & Chris Thompson	September 12, 1992	111
A substitute producer for Artie causes the staff of the show to panic.
6	6	"The Flirt Episode"	Ken Kwapis	Garry Shandling and Fred Barron	September 19, 1992	102
Jeannie becomes very jealous and accuses Larry of flirting with a playful Mimi Rogers on the show. Guests include Mimi Rogers and Michael Richards.
7	7	"Hank's Contract"	Roy London	Paul Simms	September 26, 1992	112
It's contract negotiation time for Hank and he's going for a raise ... and a golf cart. Guests include Robin Williams and George Foreman.
8	8	"Out of the Loop"	Ken Kwapis	Marjorie Gross	October 3, 1992	107
Larry feels out of touch when he's the last to know that his headwriter is having a torrid office affair. Guests include Peter Falk.
9	9	"The Talk Show Episode"	Todd Holland	Maya Forbes	October 10, 1992	113
An argument at home with Jeannie causes Larry to lose his concentration during the show that night. Guests include Billy Crystal and Catherine O'Hara.
10	10	"Party"	Todd Holland	Maya Forbes	October 17, 1992	108
A simple invitation to Arthur and his wife for dinner leads to a full-blown staff party. Guests include Martin Mull.
11	11	"The Warmth Episode"	Ken Kwapis	Paul Simms	October 24, 1992	103
Worried about his ratings, Larry hires a focus group to help him tighten up the show. Guests include Richard Simmons.
12	12	"A Brush With (the Elbow of) Greatness"	Ken Kwapis	Story by : Maya Forbes and Peter Tolan; Teleplay by : Peter Tolan	October 31, 1992	110
Larry makes the tabloids when a woman claims he knocked her into a magazine rack and neglected to apologize.
13	13	"The 'Hey Now' Episode"	Ken Kwapis	Garry Shandling and Dennis Klein	November 7, 1992	101
Hank falls asleep during the show, which is just the last straw for a fed-up Larry. Guests include Bob Saget.

=== Season 2 (1993) ===
No. overall	No. in season	Title	Directed by	Written by	Original release date	Prod. code
14	1	"The Breakdown"	Todd Holland	Garry Shandling & Chris Thompson and Paul Simms	June 2, 1993	201
15	2	"The Breakdown"	Todd Holland	Garry Shandling & Chris Thompson and Paul Simms	June 2, 1993	202
Larry struggles with the thought of another divorce, then Hank and Arthur try to help him when the divorce comes to pass.
16	3	"The List"	Roy London	Maya Forbes	June 9, 1993	203
Larry discovers some surprising secrets about his ex-wife Francine.
17	4	"The Stalker"	Todd Holland	Garry Shandling & Paul Simms	June 16, 1993	204
Larry worries over an obsessed fan stalking him.
18	5	"Larry's Agent"	Todd Holland	Story by : Victor Levin; Teleplay by : Garry Shandling & Paul Simms and Maya Forbes & Drake Sather	June 23, 1993	209
Larry decides to replace his agent with a new up-and-comer.
19	6	"The Hankerciser 200"	Dennis Erdman	John Riggi	June 30, 1993	207
Hank causes trouble with his endorsement of an exercise machine, while Arthur conducts a behind-the-scenes tour of the show for his television class.
20	7	"Life Behind Larry"	Todd Holland	Peter Tolan	July 7, 1993	210
Larry has to choose the host of a new late-night talk show, while Hank goes nuts trying to find the prankster who left a lewd remark on his fan newsletter. Guests include David Letterman.
21	8	"Artie's Gone"	Todd Holland	Paul Simms	July 14, 1993	206
Arthur gets himself stuck on the road and asks Paula to produce the show in his absence, but Larry isn't informed.
22	9	"Larry Loses Interest"	Todd Holland	Judd Apatow	July 21, 1993	205
Larry grows disillusioned with his job and ponders a career in the movies.
23	10	"Larry's Partner"	Todd Holland	Drake Sather	July 28, 1993	211
Larry receives an unexpected visit from his old stand-up partner, played by Eric Bogosian.
24	11	"Broadcast Nudes"	Todd Holland	Molly Newman	August 4, 1993	208
Playboy wants Darlene to pose for them.
25	12	"Larry's Birthday"	Todd Holland	Maya Forbes	August 11, 1993	212
A shake-up within the writing staff interrupts preparations for Larry's surprise birthday party, while Sugar Ray Leonard appears as a guest on the show.
26	13	"Being There"	Ken Kwapis	Emily Marshall	August 18, 1993	213
Larry tries to comprehend Francine's independence, while Hank feels threatened by the new bandleader. Gary Kemp (of Spandau Ballet) appears as the substitute bandleader, while Talia Balsam plays Francine’s sister.
27	14	"The Performance Artist"	Ken Kwapis	Chris Thompson and John Riggi & Drake Sather	August 25, 1993	215
The performance of an avant-garde artist causes trouble for Larry.
28	15	"Hank's Wedding"	Ken Kwapis	Molly Newman & Judd Apatow & Maya Forbes	September 8, 1993	214
Hank decides to get married on the show.
29	16	"Off Camera"	Ken Kwapis	Peter Tolan	September 15, 1993	216
A magazine writer gets a look behind the scenes of The Larry Sanders Show.
30	17	"The Grand Opening"	Paul Flaherty	Paul Simms	September 22, 1993	217
Hank struggles to open the Look-a-Round Café.
31	18	"New York or L.A."	Todd Holland	Garry Shandling & Peter Tolan & Paul Simms	September 29, 1993	218
Larry ponders his future when the network is sold.

=== Season 3 (1994) ===
No. overall	No. in season	Title	Directed by	Written by	Original release date	Prod. code
32	1	"Montana"	Todd Holland	Garry Shandling & Peter Tolan & Paul Simms	June 22, 1994	302
Arthur helps Larry plot his return to the show.
33	2	"You're Having My Baby"	Todd Holland	Mike Martineau	June 29, 1994	303
A woman from Montana claims that Larry got her pregnant.
34	3	"Would You Do Me a Favor?"	Todd Holland	Maya Forbes	July 6, 1994	304
Larry's father comes to visit, while Beverly doesn't feel appreciated.
35	4	"The Gift Episode"	Todd Holland	Garry Shandling & Paul Simms	July 13, 1994	301
Paula tries to keep Danny DeVito as a guest on the show.
36	5	"People's Choice"	Michael Lehmann	Molly Newman and Garry Shandling & Paul Simms	July 20, 1994	307
Larry is not happy that Arthur's been hired to produce the People's Choice Awards.
37	6	"Hank's Night in the Sun"	Todd Holland	Peter Tolan	July 27, 1994	309
Larry gets sick, so Hank is called on to host the show.
38	7	"Office Romance"	Alan Myerson	Maya Forbes	August 3, 1994	310
The staff of the show is at odds over the romance between Larry and Darlene.
39	8	"The Mr. Sharon Stone Show"	Todd Holland	Garry Shandling & Peter Tolan	August 10, 1994	308
Larry faces problems when he arranges a date with guest Sharon Stone.
40	9	"Headwriter Phil"	Todd Holland	Drake Sather	August 17, 1994	306
Phil is determined to be the show's head writer.
41	10	"Like No Business I Know"	Todd Holland	Mike Martineau and Peter Tolan	August 24, 1994	311
Tension mounts when Bobcat Goldthwait makes an appearance on the show, while Hank considers a job offer from Regis Philbin.
42	11	"Larry Loses a Friend"	Todd Holland	John Riggi	August 31, 1994	312
Guest Jon Lovitz attempts to take Darlene on a date.
43	12	"Doubt of the Benefit"	Todd Holland	Drake Sather and Garry Shandling & Peter Tolan	September 7, 1994	313
Larry thinks his refusal to host a charity benefit has cost him the chance of getting Rob Reiner on his show.
44	13	"Hank's Divorce"	Todd Holland	Paul Simms	September 14, 1994	314
Hank faces marital trouble on the first anniversary of his marriage.
45	14	"The Fourteenth Floor"	Todd Holland	Maya Forbes	September 21, 1994	305
Larry pays the price for making fun of the network on his show.
46	15	"Next Stop...Bottom"	Todd Holland	Story by : Garry Shandling & Paul Simms and Judd Apatow; Teleplay by : Judd Apatow	September 28, 1994	317
Hank hits the skids as a result of his divorce.
47	16	"Arthur's Crises"	Alan Myerson	John Riggi	October 5, 1994	315
Even though Arthur is having an affair, Larry suspects he's being lured into another job.
48	17	"End of the Season"	Todd Holland	Story by : Garry Shandling & Peter Tolan; Teleplay by : Maya Forbes & Paul Simms	October 12, 1994	316
Roseanne helps Larry with his addiction to painkillers.

=== Season 4 (1995) ===
No. overall	No. in season	Title	Directed by	Written by	Original release date	Prod. code
49	1	"Roseanne's Return"	Todd Holland	Story by : Garry Shandling; Teleplay by : Maya Forbes & Steve Levitan	July 19, 1995	401
Larry is anxious over an upcoming appearance by Roseanne.
50	2	"Hank's New Assistant"	Todd Holland	John Riggi	July 26, 1995	402
Hank discovers that his new assistant is homosexual, while Larry feels offended by a Dana Carvey impression of him.
51	3	"Arthur After Hours"	Todd Holland	Peter Tolan	August 2, 1995	405
Arthur thinks about quitting the show when he becomes fed up with Larry's power trips.
52	4	"The Bump"	Todd Holland	Story by : Jeff Cesario; Teleplay by : Judd Apatow & Garry Shandling	August 9, 1995	404
Larry tries desperately to schedule Jeff Cesario for an appearance on the show.
53	5	"Jeannie's Visit"	Todd Holland	Jon Vitti	August 16, 1995	406
Larry gets a surprise from his ex-wife Jeannie, which reignites old sparks.
54	6	"The P.A."	Alan Myerson	Maya Forbes	August 23, 1995	407
Artie hires his no-good son for a job on the show.
55	7	"Hank's Sex Tape"	Todd Holland	Jon Vitti	August 30, 1995	403
An embarrassing sex tape creates problems for Hank.
56	8	"Nothing Personal"	Todd Holland	Steve Levitan & Garry Shandling	September 13, 1995	409
While Larry is asked to get his friend Jeff Goldblum on the show, he asks his staff to help him get a date with a network publicist.
57	9	"Brother, Can You Spare 1.2 Million?"	Todd Holland	Peter Tolan	September 20, 1995	410
Larry discovers that his accountant (Paul Willson) has left him broke.
58	10	"Conflict of Interest"	Todd Holland	Story by : Judd Apatow & Garry Shandling; Teleplay by : Judd Apatow & Maya Forbes	September 27, 1995	411
Paula's romance with Larry's agent creates problems for the show.
59	11	"I Was a Teenage Lesbian"	Michael Lehmann	Peter Tolan	October 11, 1995	412
Paula deals with both a health problem and Brett Butler, with whom she once had an affair.
60	12	"Larry's Sitcom"	Todd Holland	Story by : Mark LaVine & Eddie Ring; Teleplay by : John Riggi & Jon Vitti	October 18, 1995	413
Larry battles the network over a new sitcom starring Chris Elliott
61	13	"Larry's Big Idea"	Todd Holland	Lester Lewis	October 25, 1995	408
Larry decides to feature the staff on the show.
62	14	"Beverly and the Prop Job"	Todd Holland	Maya Forbes & Garry Shandling	November 1, 1995	414
Beverly's brother's statements about racism on The Larry Sanders Show convince her to look for another job.
63	15	"0.409"	Alan Myerson	Peter Tolan	November 8, 1995	415
Larry's romance with a teenage intern leads to trouble at work.
64	16	"Eight"	Todd Holland	Peter Tolan	November 15, 1995	417
Larry struggles to go through the show's eighth anniversary special, despite several crises.
65	17	"Larry's on Vacation"	Todd Holland	Maya Forbes & John Riggi	November 22, 1995	416
With Larry off from work, Sandra Bernhard fills in as guest host - and her manager intends to take over the show.

=== Season 5 (1996–97) ===
No. overall	No. in season	Title	Directed by	Written by	Original release date	Prod. code
66	1	"Everybody Loves Larry"	Todd Holland	Jon Vitti	November 13, 1996	503
While Larry tries to stop guest host Jon Stewart from gaining a grip on the show, he wonders if David Duchovny is gay. In 1997, TV Guide ranked this episode #39 on its list of the 100 Greatest Episodes.
67	2	"My Name is Asher Kingsley"	Todd Holland	Peter Tolan	November 20, 1996	505
Hank's religious conversion does not sit well with Larry and the network.
68	3	"Where is the Love?"	Todd Holland	Story by : Garry Shandling and John Markus; Teleplay by : John Markus	November 27, 1996	501
Larry comes into conflict with Washington Post critic Tom Shales.
69	4	"Ellen, Or Isn't She?"	Alan Myerson	Story by : Garry Shandling and Judd Apatow & John Markus; Teleplay by : Judd Apatow & John Markus	December 11, 1996	508
Larry is pressured to get Ellen DeGeneres to come out on the show, while the confidential budget divides the staff.
70	5	"The New Writer"	Michael Lehmann	Story by : Becky Hartman Edwards and Garry Shandling; Teleplay by : Becky Hartman Edwards and John Riggi	December 18, 1996	507
Phil tries to stay on top of a new female writer, while Hank thinks Kevin Nealon is after his job.
71	6	"The Matchmaker"	Todd Holland	John Riggi	January 8, 1997	506
Hank tries to stop a rumor that he's gay, while Larry is reluctant to fire an incompetent staff member.
72	7	"Make a Wish"	Michael Lehmann	Jon Vitti	January 15, 1997	509
Larry is determined to make a popular magazine's sexiest men list, while customs exposes Hank's cigar smuggling operation.
73	8	"Artie, Angie, Hank and Hercules"	John Riggi	Peter Tolan	January 22, 1997	511
Arthur can't resist acting on his obsession with Angie Dickinson.
74	9	"The Prank"	Michael Lange	Carol Leifer & Lester Lewis	January 29, 1997	510
While Larry suspects Lori Loughlin of robbery, Hank woos a single mom and Phil concocts a plan to meet models.
75	10	"The Book"	Alan Myerson	Maya Forbes	February 5, 1997	512
Larry decides to write a memoir about his career.
76	11	"Pain Equals Funny"	Todd Holland	Jeff Cesario	February 12, 1997	504
Larry makes Paula a producer without asking Arthur, while Phil's girlfriend affects his work.
77	12	"The Roast"	Alan Myerson	Story by : Garry Shandling & Adam Resnick; Teleplay by : Adam Resnick	February 19, 1997	513
Arthur talks Larry into being the focus of a celebrity roast.
78	13	"Larry's New Love"	Todd Holland	John Riggi	February 26, 1997	502
Larry's co-workers suspect his new girlfriend may have an ulterior motive.

=== Season 6 (1998) ===
No. overall	No. in season	Title	Directed by	Written by	Original release date	Prod. code
79	1	"Another List"	Thomas Schlamme	Garry Shandling & Adam Resnick	March 15, 1998	603
The network presses Larry after a good show guest hosted by Jon Stewart, while Hank meets a fan who looks just like him.
80	2	"The Beginning of the End"	David Mirkin	Peter Tolan & Garry Shandling	March 22, 1998	604
Stalled contract negotiations could lead to the end of The Larry Sanders Show.
81	3	"As My Career Lay Dying"	Garry Shandling	Peter Tolan	March 29, 1998	606
With The Larry Sanders Show coming to an end, the whole staff looks to the future.
82	4	"Pilots and Pens Lost"	Alan Myerson	Peter Tolan	April 5, 1998	602
Arthur loses a special gift from Larry, while Phil quits to create his own show.
83	5	"The Interview"	Todd Holland	Story by : Kell Cahoon & Tom Saunders and Garry Shandling; Teleplay by : Kell Cahoon & Tom Saunders	April 12, 1998	607
Larry tries to edit out the revealing parts of an interview, while Mary Lou tries to tell Hank that she hit his car.
84	6	"Adolf Hankler"	Garry Shandling	Alex Gregory & Peter Huyck	April 19, 1998	605
Guest host Jon Stewart stumbles when he tries to refashion The Larry Sanders Show, while Larry's brother Stan (Wayne Federman) pays a visit.
85	7	"Beverly's Secret"	Michael Lehmann	Peter Tolan & Garry Shandling	April 26, 1998	601
Larry and the staff try to figure out the guest who got Beverly pregnant, while Hank spends a week with a Wisconsin family.
86	8	"I Buried Sid"	Garry Shandling	Story by : Garry Shandling and Judd Apatow & Adam Resnick; Teleplay by : Judd Apatow & Adam Resnick	May 3, 1998	608
Hank feels his jealous criticism led Larry's longtime cue card man to commit suicide.
87	9	"Just the Perfect Blendship"	Melanie Mayron	Peter Tolan and Kell Cahoon & Tom Saunders	May 10, 1998	610
Larry worries that dating Gina Gershon will ruin his friendship with Jeff Goldblum, while Mary Lou agrees to book Wendy as a comic on the show.
88	10	"Putting the "Gay" Back in Litigation"	Judd Apatow	Richard Day and Alex Gregory & Peter Huyck	May 17, 1998	609
Larry's last week on the show is affected by a sexual harassment suit issued by Brian against Phil for his gay jokes.
89	11	"Flip"	Todd Holland	Peter Tolan & Garry Shandling	May 31, 1998	611
90	12	"Flip"	Todd Holland	Peter Tolan & Garry Shandling	May 31, 1998	612
In the series finale, Larry Sanders tapes his last show over his '10-year run', headlined by guests Jim Carrey, Jerry Seinfeld, Tim Allen, Ellen DeGeneres, Carol Burnett, Sean Penn, Clint Black. This show was 1 hour long instead of the usual 30 minutes.
