= Maya Forbes =

American screenwriter and television producer

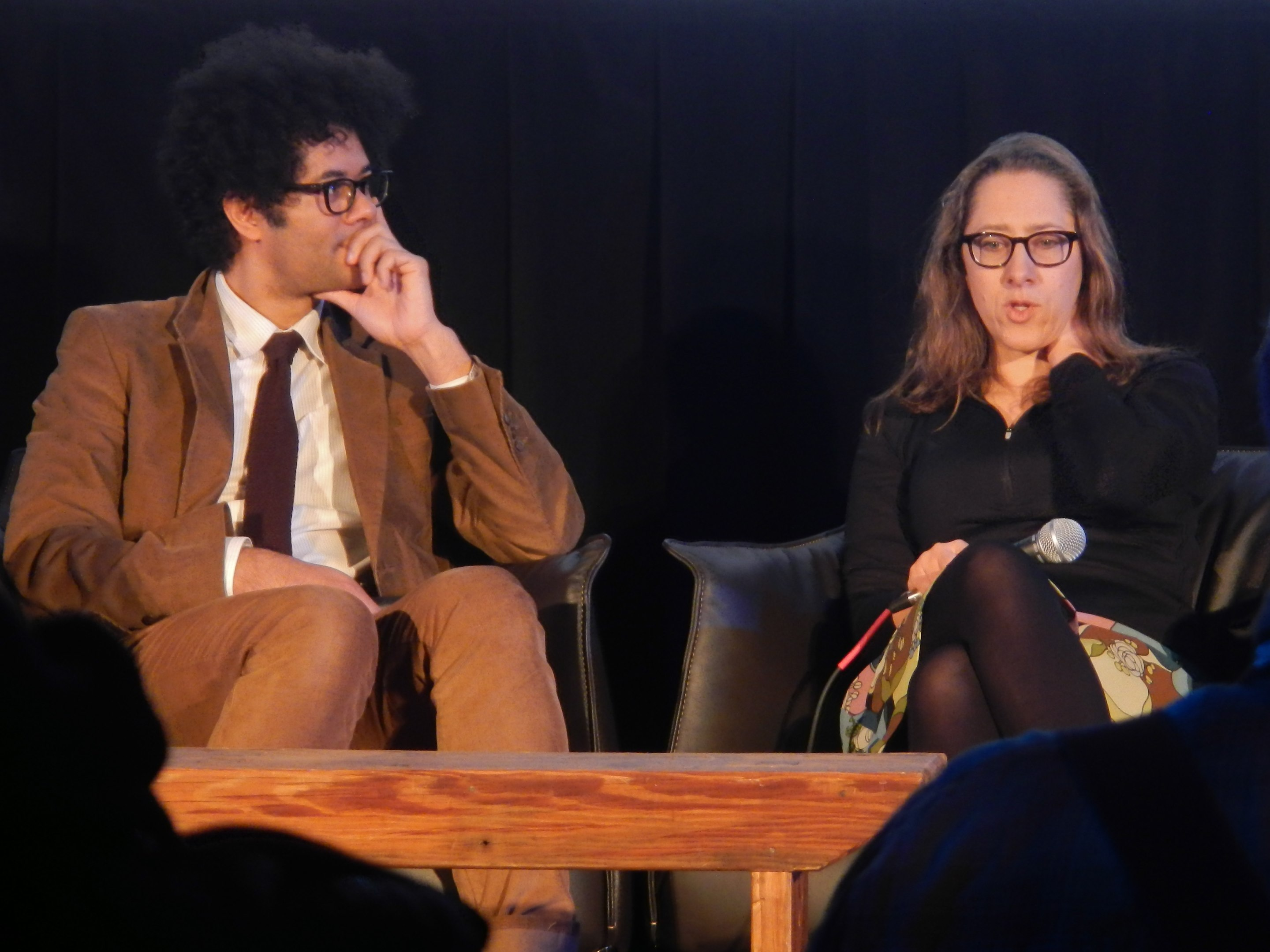
- Maya Forbes (right) at "Cinema Cafe" at the Sundance Festival, January 17, 2014
- Born: Maya C. Forbes; July 23, 1968 (age 58); Cambridge, Massachusetts, U.S.
- Education: Harvard University
- Occupations: Screenwriter, producer, director
- Years active: 1995–present
- Spouse: Wallace Wolodarsky (m. 2004)
- Relatives: China Forbes (sister)

Maya Forbes (born July 23, 1968) is an American screenwriter and television producer. She made her debut as a film director with Infinitely Polar Bear (2014). Her other writing credits include the screenplay of The Rocker (2008) and many episodes of The Larry Sanders Show. She was a co-executive producer of The Larry Sanders Show in its later seasons and executive producer of the sitcom The Naked Truth.

Forbes received Emmy and WGA Award nominations for her work on The Larry Sanders Show.

== Life and career ==
Forbes was born in Cambridge, Massachusetts, the daughter of Peggy (née Woodford) and Donald Cameron Forbes (1939–1998). Her father was of French/Scottish descent, and her mother is African American.

Forbes is married to Wally Wolodarsky, who was co-screenwriter of The Rocker and a producer of Infinitely Polar Bear. China Forbes (lead singer of Pink Martini) is Maya Forbes's sister. Both she and her sister attended Phillips Exeter Academy, as did their father, graduating in 1986, 1988, and 1957, respectively. She attended Harvard, where she wrote for the Harvard Lampoon, graduating in 1990. Both her sister and father also attended Harvard, graduating in 1992 and 1961, respectively. Part of the prominent Boston Brahmin elite Forbes family through her father's side, she is related to U.S. Secretary of State John Forbes Kerry and his brother acting U.S. Secretary of Commerce Cameron Forbes Kerry.

Forbes based Infinitely Polar Bear on her own experiences as a child in Cambridge, Massachusetts, when her father—who had bipolar disorder—was the primary caregiver for Forbes and her sister while their mother was studying for an MBA at Columbia Business School in New York City. Her mother, upon graduating, went to work for Wall Street, first in the futures market at E. F. Hutton, and then for Merrill Lynch, where she remained for nearly a decade. Her mother was the first African American woman to start an investment management firm in growth equity management in the United States.

Imogene Wolodarsky, Forbes's daughter, plays a fictionalized version of Forbes in Infinitely Polar Bear. (The character's name is Amelia Stuart, but the film is described as autobiographical.)
