= Pellicano =

Pellicano may refer to:

- Pellicano (surname)
- CVV-4 Pellicano, Italian glider designed for a competition to select an aircraft for the 1940 Olympic Games
- Italian ship Pellicano, multiple ships
- Anthony Pellicano an American private investigator and convicted felon, known as a high-profile fixer.
- Anthony Pellicano wiretapping scandal illegal surveillance of celebrities and litigants on behalf of entertainment industry clients
