= List of Welcome Back, Kotter episodes =

Welcome Back, Kotter is an American television comedy sitcom that originally aired on the ABC network from September 9, 1975 to June 8, 1979.

The show stars comedian Gabe Kaplan as the title character Gabe Kotter, a wise-cracking teacher who returns to his high school alma mater—the fictional James Buchanan High in Brooklyn, New York—to teach an often unruly group of remedial wiseguys known as the "Sweathogs" (the nickname reflecting the fact that the remedial classes were held on the very top floor of the high school). The school's principal was perpetually absent, while the uptight vice principal dismissed the Sweathogs as worthless hoodlums and only expected Kotter to attempt to control them until they inevitably dropped out.

Ninety-five episodes were produced during Welcome Back, Kotter's four-year run. The show's producers did not know for certain that the show would be cancelled after the 1978–79 season due to declining ratings. Kotter has no official finale with the long-awaited graduation for the Sweathogs. Instead, the last original episode dealt with a feud that ensues when Washington (Lawrence Hilton-Jacobs) gets an after-school job Epstein (Robert Hegyes) felt was rightly his.

== Series overview ==
Season	Episodes	Originally released	
Season	Episodes	First released	Last released
1	22	September 9, 1975	February 26, 1976
2	23	September 23, 1976	March 3, 1977
3	27	September 10, 1977	May 18, 1978
4	23	September 11, 1978	June 8, 1979

== Episodes ==
=== Season 1 (1975–76) ===
No. overall	No. in season	Title	Directed by	Written by	Original release date
1	1	"The Great Debate"	Bob LaHendro	Rick Mittleman	September 9, 1975
The Sweathogs debate Mr. Welles's (James Woods) class after continual putdowns, with the debate topic involving student aggression. Note: First appearances of Judy Borden (Helaine Lembeck), Todd Ludlow (Dennis Bowen), and Rosalie "Hotsy" Totsy (Debralee Scott).
2	2	"Basket Case"	Bob LaHendro	Jerry Ross	September 16, 1975
Freddie is certain he's a basketball star in the making, so he thinks he doesn't have to pass his classes.
3	3	"Welcome Back"	James Komack	Peter Meyerson	September 23, 1975
Pilot episode: Gabe is introduced to the Sweathogs on his first day as a teacher. In frustration, he quits, but the Sweathogs visit him at home and convince him to return.
4	4	"Whodunit?"	Bob LaHendro	Jewel Jaffe & Jerry Rannow	September 30, 1975
Rosalie Totsy claims one of the Sweathogs got her pregnant as an effort to change her reputation.
5	5	"The Election"	Bob LaHendro	Eric Cohen & Tiffany York	October 7, 1975
Vinnie runs for student body president, but his campaign is a disaster, despite Gabe's efforts.
6	6	"No More Mr. Nice Guy"	Bob LaHendro	George Yanok	October 14, 1975
Gabe convinces Mr. Woodman to teach war history for a day after being accused of stealing his favorite yellow chalk.
7	7	"Classroom Marriage"	Bob LaHendro	William Raynor & Myles Wilder	October 21, 1975
Vernajean and Freddie decide to get married so they can stay together, but the Sweathogs convince them otherwise.
8	8	"One of Our Sweathogs Is Missing"	Bob LaHendro	Marilyn Miller	October 28, 1975
Epstein gets in a fight with Todd Ludlow after insulting his date; Epstein loses and runs away for a couple of days.
9	9	"Mr. Kotter, Teacher"	Bob LaHendro	Jewel Jaffe & Jerry Rannow	November 4, 1975
Mr. Woodman accuses Gabe of not following standard teaching procedures because he isn't teaching from the standard textbook. The Sweathogs come to his defense in front of the school board.
10	10	"The Reunion"	Bob LaHendro	George Yanok	November 18, 1975
Gabe isn't happy about an old "perfect" schoolmate and his "perfect" wife visiting him.
11	11	"Barbarino's Girl"	Bob LaHendro	Eric Cohen	November 25, 1975
Judy tutors Vinnie, and they start liking each other. The Sweathogs start cracking jokes, but Vinnie stands up for her.
12	12	"California Dreamin'"	Bob LaHendro	Michael Weinberger	December 2, 1975
A new student (Bambi) pretends to be a surfer girl and distracts all the Sweathogs.
13	13	"Arrividerci, Arnold"	Bob LaHendro	Jewel Jaffe & Jerry Rannow	December 16, 1975
Woodman promotes Horshack out of the Sweathogs, but he gets let back in after Gabe and the class convince him otherwise.
14	14	"The Longest Weekend"	Bob LaHendro	Carl Kleinschmitt	January 6, 1976
Julie goes away on a ski trip to Vermont with a recently divorced friend. Gabe is lonely and prepares to visit her, but is interrupted when she comes home early.
15	15	"The Sit-In"	Bob LaHendro	William Bickley & Michael Warren	January 13, 1976
The Sweathogs protest the cafeteria's liver by planning a food fight, but Gabe convinces them to have a sit-in as an alternate method of protesting.
16	16	"Follow The Leader: Part 1"	Bob LaHendro	Jewel Jaffe & Jerry Rannow	January 20, 1976
The class votes to make Freddie the new Sweathog leader, which causes Vinnie to quit school. Julie is jealous of Gabe's attention to the Sweathogs, and goes to stay at a hotel.
17	17	"Follow The Leader: Part 2"	Bob LaHendro	Jewel Jaffe & Jerry Rannow	January 22, 1976
The Sweathogs tire of Freddie as their leader, and Gabe convinces Vinnie to return to school. Julie forgives Gabe and moves back home.
18	18	"Dr. Epstein, I Presume"	Bob LaHendro	George Yanok	January 29, 1976
Epstein wants to become a veterinarian, but is discouraged by his guidance counselor since his grades don't show that he can.
19	19	"One Flu Over The Cuckoo's Nest"	Bob LaHendro	Eric Cohen	February 5, 1976
After a flu epidemic hits, Gabe combines the few remaining healthy students into one class.
20	20	"The Telethon"	Bob LaHendro	Pat Proft & Bo Kaprall	February 12, 1976
The Sweathogs put on a telethon to raise $700 for new supplies so they can continue to have a class.
21	21	"Kotter Makes Good"	Bob LaHendro	George Yanok	February 19, 1976
Gabe volunteers to take tests with the Sweathogs after Mr. Woodman can't find his senior exams. The records are found, but Gabe takes the tests anyway.
22	22	"Father Vinnie"	Bob LaHendro	Eric Cohen	February 26, 1976
Vinnie's dying grandmother wants him to become a priest. Vinnie tries, but gives it up when he has to stop dating.

=== Season 2 (1976–77) ===
No. overall	No. in season	Title	Directed by	Written by	Original release date
23	1	"Career Day"	Bill Hobin	Eric Cohen	September 23, 1976
Gabe is offered a job by a wealthy Asian (Pat Morita), but decides teaching is more important than wealth.
24	2	"Inherit The Halibut"	Bill Hobin	Neil Rosen & George Tricker	September 30, 1976
The Sweathogs accuse Freddie (the class treasurer) of stealing some money to buy himself a new bike, and put him on trial.
25	3	"Sweatside Story"	Bill Persky	Eric Cohen	October 7, 1976
The Sweathogs try to form their own gang in response to a scare from another gang. Gabe, Arnold, and Mr. Woodman act tough enough to scare both gangs out of any violent activity. (The title is a takeoff on West Side Story.)
26	4	"The Fight"	Bob LaHendro	Jewel Jaffe & Jerry Rannow	October 21, 1976
Vinnie forgets to do Freddie's "show and tell" homework as promised, causing the Sweathogs to have a fight.
27	5	"The Museum"	Bill Davis	Bob Shayne	October 28, 1976
The Sweathogs go on a field trip to a museum and meet its mysterious, superstitious curator (John Astin). In the process, they all get locked in a tomb of a mummy which supposedly holds a curse.
28	6	"Gabe Under Pressure"	Jay Sandrich	George Yanok	November 4, 1976
Gabe has a stomach pain, but is afraid to get a physical at the free clinic.
29	7	"Sweathog, Nebraska Style"	Bob LaHendro	George Yanok	November 11, 1976
Julie's sister Jenny (Susan Pratt) from Nebraska makes a surprise visit. Much to Julie's dismay, Jenny goes out with Epstein, but dumps him after getting a call from her ex-boyfriend.
30	8	"Sadie Hawkins Day"	Bob LaHendro	Steve Clements & Joyce Gittlin	November 18, 1976
All of the Sweathogs have dates for the Sadie Hawkins dance except Vinnie, due to his insensitivity, so he attends alone. (Note: A then unknown Dinah Manoff guest stars on this episode. She would meet up with John Travolta again for 1978's Grease.)
31	9	"Hello, Ms. Chips"	Bob LaHendro	Royce D. Applegate & Ira Miller	December 2, 1976
A new student teacher, Ms. Wright (Valerie Curtin) tries to teach the Sweathogs, with some difficulty.
32	10	"Horshack vs. Carvelli"	Bob LaHendro	Garry Shandling	December 9, 1976
Horshack wants to fight Carvelli in the upcoming boxing match.
33	11	"Sweathog Clinic for the Cure of Smoking"	Bob LaHendro	Eric Cohen & Steve Hayden	December 16, 1976
Gabe and Mr. Woodman catch Epstein smoking; Gabe and the Sweathogs help him to quit.
34	12	"Hark, the Sweatkings"	Bob LaHendro	Nick Arnold & Peter Meyerson	December 23, 1976
The Sweathogs want to help a homeless man (Michael V. Gazzo) after hearing his life story.
35	13	"A Love Story"	James Komack & Gary Shimokawa	Jewel Jaffe & Jerry Rannow	December 30, 1976
Epstein's sister Carmen (Lisa Mordente) joins the Sweathogs, but he threatens to kill anyone who lays a hand on her.
36	14	"Caruso's Way"	Bob LaHendro	Jim Parker	January 6, 1977
Mr. Caruso (Scott Brady) slaps Vinnie during gym class, and is late for his next class. Caruso refuses to apologize, despite Vinnie's apology, and challenges him to an arm-wrestling match.
37	15	"Sweatgate Scandal"	Bob LaHendro	Eric Cohen	January 13, 1977
After a break-in at Principal Lazarus' office, the Sweathogs decide to investigate while working on the school newspaper.
38	16	"Kotter and Son"	Bob LaHendro	Nick Arnold & Peter Meyerson	January 20, 1977
Gabe's father (Harold J. Stone), convinced that Gabe is in the wrong career, comes for a visit and observes him with the Sweathogs.
39	17	"Chicken à la Kotter"	Bob LaHendro	Raymond Siller	January 27, 1977
Gabe cannot afford a root canal, so he works a night job as Captain Chicken to pay for it; Julie thinks he's having an affair.
40	18	"Has Anyone Seen Arnold?"	Bob LaHendro	Nick Arnold & Peter Meyerson	February 3, 1977
Horshack goes missing, and Vinnie takes his place as the lead in the school play, Cyrano de Bergerac. Part 1 of 2.
41	19	"There Goes Number 5"	James Komack & Bob LaHendro	Jewel Jaffe & Jerry Rannow	February 3, 1977
The reason for Horshack's absence turns out to be the death of his fifth father. Horshack takes on the responsibility of providing for his mother and siblings, and gets a part-time job with his uncle. Conclusion.
42	20	"The Littlest Sweathog"	Bob LaHendro	Eric Cohen	February 10, 1977
Gabe and Julie find out that she's pregnant.
43	21	"Radio Free Freddie"	Bob LaHendro	Peter Meyerson, Neil Rosen & George Yanok	February 17, 1977
The Sweathogs are invited to go on the air at a local radio station. Freddie goes on after the other three decline, and becomes an instant success, but risks losing his friends. George Carlin and Fred Grandy guest star.
44	22	"I'm Having Their Baby"	Bob LaHendro	Neil Rosen & George Tricker	February 24, 1977
While Gabe is away at a teacher's convention, the Sweathogs try to help Julie with her pregnancy, but make her even more uncomfortable in the process.
45	23	"I Wonder Who's Kissing Gabe Now"	Bob LaHendro	Nick Arnold & Peter Meyerson	March 3, 1977
The art teacher tells Gabe she is in love with him and kisses him, despite his resistance. Gabe tells Julie but forgets to mention the kiss. Epstein backs up Gabe's story.

=== Season 3 (1977–78) ===
No. overall	No. in season	Title	Directed by	Written by	Original release date
46	1	"Sweathog Back to School Special"	Bob Claver	Nick Arnold & Peter Meyerson	September 10, 1977
The Sweathogs reminisce about the last two years as they start a new semester.
47	2	"And Baby Makes Four"	Bob Claver	Eric Cohen	September 15, 1977
48	3	"And Baby Makes Four"	Bob Claver	Eric Cohen	September 15, 1977
The Sweathogs return to school as 11th graders, except for Vinnie. Julie goes into labor, and Woodman has to announce it over the school loudspeakers after Gabe threw him out of his classroom. Part 1 of 3. While Julie is giving birth to twins, Vinnie tries to get Gabe to talk to Woodman about letting him back into the 11th grade. Part 2 of 3.
49	4	"The Visit"	Bob Claver	Gabriel Kaplan	September 22, 1977
Julie's parents come for an unexpected visit to see the twins, and Gabe has to sleep on the fire escape. The Sweathogs help Gabe get up the courage to ask them to leave. Conclusion
50	5	"Buddy, Can You Spare a Million?"	Bob Claver	Nick Arnold & Peter Meyerson	September 29, 1977
Gabe and Vinnie fight over prize money from a lottery ticket.
51	6	"Just Testing"	Bob Claver	Mike Barrie & Jim Mulholland	October 6, 1977
Gabe refuses to help Vinnie cram for the 12th grade entrance test, so he gets help from the Sweathogs.
52	7	"The Deprogramming of Arnold Horshack"	Bob Claver	Mike Barrie & Jim Mulholland	October 13, 1977
Horshack drops out of school to join a religious cult, and the others try to get him out of it.
53	8	"What a Move"	Nick Havinga	George Bloom & Beverly Bloomberg	October 20, 1977
Epstein finds a new apartment for the Kotters, but their stay is short-lived. Herb Edelman guest stars as Moe Epstein.
54	9	"A Novel Idea"	Bob Claver	Nick Arnold & Peter Meyerson	October 27, 1977
The characters in Mr. Woodman's new novel seem to be very similar to the Sweathogs.
55	10	"Barbarino in Love: Part 1"	Bob Claver	Nick Arnold & Peter Meyerson	November 3, 1977
Vinnie is supposed to be rehearsing for a talent show with the Sweathogs, but instead spends time with a girl who they are competing against.
56	11	"Barbarino in Love: Part 2"	Bob Claver	Steve Clements & Joyce Gittlin	November 10, 1977
Vinnie isn't sure if he wants to try to win the talent competition, or whether he should let his new girlfriend win.
57	12	"Kotter for Vice-Principal"	Bob Claver	Steve Clements & Joyce Gittlin	November 17, 1977
The Sweathogs try to get Gabe to become vice-principal. Gabe tells Woodman that he isn't interested, and later has a dream set in the year 2050.
58	13	"Swine and Punishment"	Bob Claver	Eric Cohen	November 24, 1977
Mr. Woodman suspects Freddie of cheating on a test.
59	14	"Epstein's Madonna"	Bob Claver	George Bloom & Beverly Bloomberg	December 8, 1977
Epstein creates a nude painting on the school wall... of Mrs. Kotter.
60	15	"A Sweathog Christmas Special"	Mel Stuart	Eric Cohen & Mel Stuart	December 15, 1977
The Sweathogs share Christmas memories as they help the Kotters trim their tree.
61	16	"Sweatwork"	Bob Claver	Eric Cohen	December 22, 1977
Horshack pushes for change to the school radio station, and gets some support along the way. Parody of Network.
62	17	"Meet Your New Teacher"	Bob Claver	Garry Ferrier & Aubrey Tadman	January 5, 1978
The Sweathogs' grades rise when they get tutored by a computer, but Gabe is afraid it will replace him.
63	18	"Angie"	Alan Myerson	Eric Cohen	January 12, 1978
A new student named Angie (Melonie Haller) wants to join the Sweathogs, but is denied membership because she is a girl.
64	19	"Epstein's Term Paper"	Bob Claver	Eric Cohen	January 19, 1978
Epstein buys four term papers from Carvelli (Charles Fleischer) and the Sweathogs turn them in as their own, only to discover that Gabe wrote one of them 11 years earlier.
65	20	"There's No Business: Part 1"	Bob Claver	Gabriel Kaplan	January 26, 1978
The Sweathogs convince Gabe to pursue his dream as a stand-up comic. His imitations of them are a success, and he gives up teaching for a job at a nightclub.
66	21	"There's No Business: Part 2"	Bob Claver	George Bloom & Beverly Bloomberg	February 2, 1978
The Sweathogs and Mr. Woodman want Gabe to come back to teaching.
67	22	"What Goes Up"	Jeff Bleckner	Nick Arnold	February 9, 1978
Freddie becomes hooked on prescription painkillers, but the only thing that saves him is Epstein's "vitamin pills."
68	23	"Goodbye, Mr. Kripps"	Bob Claver	Garry Ferrier & Aubrey Tadman	February 16, 1978
Vinnie blames himself for his shop teacher's fatal heart attack, which came on while Mr. Kripps was yelling at him.
69	24	"Horshack and Madame X"	Al Schwartz	Peter Meyerson	February 23, 1978
Horshack keeps getting rejected by girls, and falls in love with Julie after she gave him comfort and advice.
70	25	"The Kiss"	Bob Claver	Max Wynne Goldenson & Peter Meyerson	March 9, 1978
Gabe's job is at risk after he is accused of kissing a girl who fainted, though he actually performed mouth-to-mouth resuscitation.
71	26	"The Return of Hotsy Totsy"	Bob Claver	Gabriel Kaplan	May 11, 1978
The Sweathogs find former classmate Hotsy working at a strip club, and try to help her finish high school and get a better job.
72	27	"Class Encounters of the Carvelli Kind"	Robert Hegyes	George Bloom & Beverly Bloomberg	May 18, 1978
Carvelli and Murray are exchange students; Carvelli tells stories about aliens.

=== Season 4 (1978–79) ===
No. overall	No. in season	Title	Directed by	Written by	Original release date
73	1	"The Drop-Ins"	Norman Abbott	George Bloom	September 11, 1978
74	2	"The Drop-Ins"	Norman Abbott	George Bloom	September 11, 1978
The Sweathogs are upset when Gabe becomes vice-principal (therefore not spending enough time with them), and decide to drop out. The Sweathogs decide to come back to school, after trying to get jobs at a hospital.
75	3	"Don't Come Up and See Me Sometime"	Norman Abbott	Gene Perret & Bill Richmond	September 25, 1978
Vinnie throws the Sweathogs out of his new apartment in order to get some privacy.
76	4	"Once Upon a Ledge"	Norman Abbott	Richard Hawkins & Liz Sage	October 2, 1978
New student Mary Johnson (Irene Arranga) contemplates suicide after having a hard time making friends.
77	5	"The Sweatmobile"	Norman Abbott	Gene Perret & Bill Richmond	October 9, 1978
The Sweathogs' new car is wrecked during delivery.
78	6	"Beau's Jest"	Norman Abbott	Earl Barret, Richard Hawkins & Liz Sage	October 16, 1978 (Note: This episode was originally scheduled to air on September 18, 1978, but was preempted due to news coverage of Camp David Accords.)
A new student, Beau De Labarre (Stephen Shortridge), is trying to take attention away from the Sweathogs.
79	7	"Barbarino's Boo-Boo"	Norman Abbott	Linda Morris & Vic Rauseo	October 21, 1978
Mr. Woodman goes to the hospital for surgery, and Vinnie, an orderly there, misplaces him while distracted in front of a bank of elevators. The Sweathogs make an exhaustive search over the massive 700-room facility.
80	8	"X-Rated Education"	Norman Abbott	Bill Greer & Kathy Greer	October 28, 1978
The Sweathogs try to watch an X-rated film after it is accidentally switched with a sex education film intended to show to placate a group of disapproving conservative parents.
81	9	"The Barbarino Blues"	Norman Abbott	Linda Morris & Vic Rauseo	November 4, 1978
Vinnie is depressed when the girl he wanted to break up with dumped him first.
82	10	"Washington's Clone"	Norman Abbott	Dinah Kirgo & Julie Kirgo	November 11, 1978
A younger student tries to impress the Sweathogs by imitating Freddie.
83	11	"Frog Day Afternoon"	Norman Abbott	Earl Barret, Richard Hawkins & Liz Sage	November 25, 1978
Horshack refuses to dissect a frog in biology class, which jeopardizes his grade.
84	12	"A Little Fright Music"	Norman Abbott	Earl Barret & George Bloom	December 2, 1978
The Sweathogs try to change Mr. Woodman's school song to a disco version.
85	13	"A Winter's Coat Tale"	Norman Abbott	Earl Barret & George Bloom	December 16, 1978
Vinnie's new coat is stolen by muggers.
86	14	"Bride and Gloom"	Norman Abbott	Earl Barret & George Bloom	January 13, 1979
Epstein asks Vinnie to marry his immigrant cousin so she can get citizenship.
87	15	"Barbarino's Baby"	Norman Abbott	Linda Morris & Vic Rauseo	February 3, 1979
Barbarino delivers a baby in an elevator. (This episode was the final appearance of John Travolta on the series.)
88	16	"The Goodbye Guy"	Norman Abbott	Suzanne Gayle Harris, Rick Hawkins & Liz Sage	February 10, 1979
Epstein almost moves in with Mr. Woodman's niece (Georganne LaPiere) after falling in love with her, but the relationship falls apart.
89	17	"Come Back, Little Arnold"	Norman Abbott	Rick Hawkins & Liz Sage	February 24, 1979
Horshack develops a drinking problem, after drinking liquor to get up his nerve with Mary. However, his altered personality only drives her away. Della Reese guest stars.
90	18	"The Sweat Smell of Success"	Norman Abbott	Earl Barret & George Bloom	March 3, 1979
Epstein turns the school newspaper into a tabloid, and endangers his friendships in the process.
91	19	"The Gang Show"	Norman Abbott	Gene Perret & Bill Richmond	March 17, 1979
Epstein and Freddie enter a talent show. Carvelli has bribed some judges, but Horshack and Beau take over. (Episode title is a takeoff on The Gong Show.)
92	20	"Oo-Oo, I Do"	Norman Abbott	Gene Perret & Bill Richmond	May 25, 1979
93	21	"Oo-Oo, I Do"	Norman Abbott	Gene Perret & Bill Richmond	May 25, 1979
Horshack proposes marriage to Mary after learning he has to move. Horshack and Mary get married, despite the Sweathogs' teasing.
94	22	"I'm Okay, But You're Not"	Norman Abbott	Richard Hawkins & Liz Sage	June 1, 1979
Beau plays pranks on Mr. Woodman in order to redeem himself to the Sweathogs.
95	23	"The Breadwinners"	Norman Abbott	Linda Morris & Vic Rauseo	June 8, 1979
While Horshack adjusts to married life, Freddie gets the job that Epstein was going to interview for, resulting in a fight.
