= Hollywood Wiretap =

Hollywood Wiretap is an entertainment news website founded by former Variety editor Thomas Tapp and established in 2006. Hollywood Wiretap is a news portal, similar in a style to the Drudge Report, that consists of headline text links to breaking news stories as well as site-only exclusives. The site is focused solely on stories about film, television, celebrities, and the media. Original analysis and color pieces and "mash-ups" of varying takes on big news stories also regularly appear on the site.

== Origins ==
Hollywood Wiretap was launched on May 1, 2006. Tapp coined the site's name in homage to the indictment of Anthony Pellicano, who is alleged to have participated in illegal wiretapping activities involving Hollywood celebrities.

In October 2006, Tapp handed over the editorial reins to Paris-based Nancy Tartaglione, a former Variety colleague. Tartaglione's perch in Paris, 9 hours ahead of Los Angeles, enabled Wiretap to get a jump on the day's news so that subscribers would receive their newsletters as they awoke.

In early 2008, Tapp sold Wiretap to Hollywood.com, Inc. Tapp remained with the new company for several months before segueing to Tina Brown's The Daily Beast and ultimately Yahoo, where he is a front page senior entertainment programmer.

Tartaglione continued as Managing Editor at Wiretap where she implemented a second daily newsletter in 2009 which reaches subscribers in their afternoon. She also installed former Variety and Los Angeles Times editor Kinsey Lowe as a back-up. Under Tartaglione's guidance, Lowe, along with his sometime fill-in Gary North (also a former Variety editor), have also added a third newsletter during the Cannes Film Festival which is targeted to traveling subscribers.
