= Kevin Nealon =

American comedian (born 1953)

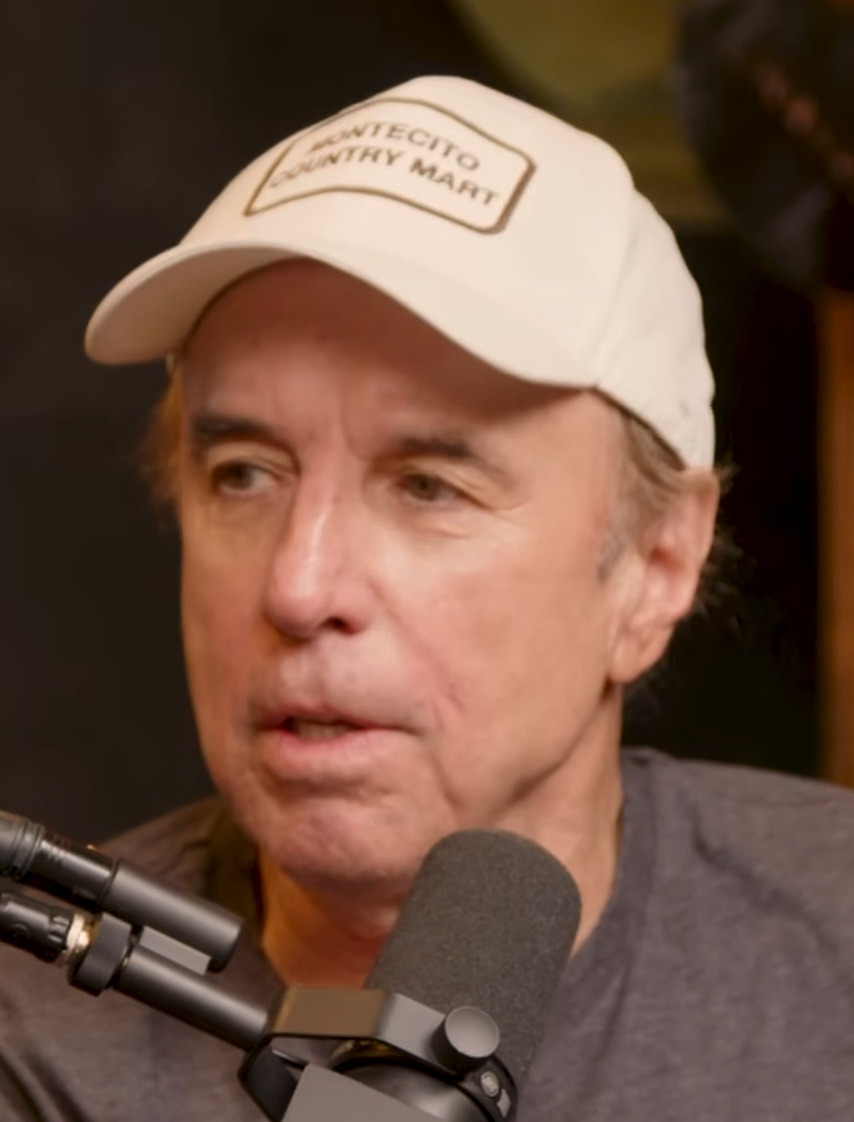
- Nealon in 2026
- Born: November 18, 1953 (age 73); St. Louis, Missouri, U.S.
- Education: Sacred Heart University (BA)
- Occupations: Actor; comedian
- Notable work: Weekend Update anchor on Saturday Night Live; Gary Potter in Happy Gilmore; Doug Wilson on Weeds; Glenn Martin on Glenn Martin, DDS
- Spouses: Linda Dupree (m. 1989; div. 2002) Susan Yeagley (m. 2005)
- Children: 1

Comedy career
- Years active: 1978–present
- Medium: Stand-up; television; film
- Genres: Satire; political satire; news satire; observational comedy
- Subjects: American politics; American culture; current events; pop culture; mass media; news media; everyday life; marriage

Kevin Nealon (/ˈniːlən/ NEE-lən; born November 18, 1953) is an American comedian and actor. He has earned a Primetime Emmy Award nomination and two Screen Actors Guild Award nominations.

He first gained widespread attention during his tenure as a cast member on the NBC sketch comedy series Saturday Night Live from 1986 to 1995, where he anchored the show's news parody segment Weekend Update. After leaving SNL, he acted in several of the Happy Madison films, played Doug Wilson on the Showtime series Weeds, and provided the voice of the title character on Glenn Martin, DDS.

== Early life and education ==
Nealon was born on November 18, 1953, in St. Louis, Missouri, to Kathleen M. (née Kimball) and Emmett F. Nealon, an aircraft company executive. He has four siblings. A few months after he was born, the family moved to Bridgeport, Connecticut; when he was six, they moved to Heidelberg, West Germany for four years. He is of Irish descent and was raised Catholic. He graduated from St. Joseph High School in Trumbull, Connecticut, in 1971 and earned a bachelor's degree in marketing from Sacred Heart University. He then took night courses at Fairfield University, where he played quarterback on the club football team.

== Career ==
Nealon played guitar in bands during high school and gravitated to comedy in college. In 1977, he moved to San Diego and then to Los Angeles where he learned his craft at the Improv while tending bar there for a living. He had been doing stand-up for six years when he made his network television debut on The Tonight Show Starring Johnny Carson in 1984. He later became a regular there and on Late Night with David Letterman. He appeared on stage, alongside Jan Hooks, both relatively unknown at the time, celebrating Tim Holleran's big $90,000 cash win on Sale of the Century in 1985 (Holleran would win over $166,000 in cash and prizes). Holleran was a fellow comedian and a good friend of both Nealon and Hooks.

In 1986, Saturday Night Live recruited his friend Dana Carvey, and Carvey, in turn, recommended Nealon. Both joined the cast that year, and Nealon became a full-time performer in the 1987–1988 season. Nealon's SNL characters include Mr. Subliminal (which also became known as the "Subliminal Editorial" when Nealon was promoted to Weekend Update anchorman), Frank Gannon, P.I.P.I. (for Politically Incorrect Private Investigator), Bob Waltman (a male Barbara Walters), and Franz (of Hans and Franz) along with Carvey. He also parodied sportscaster Brent Musburger. From 1991 to 1994, Nealon anchored Weekend Update. By the time he departed in 1995, he held the record for longest-tenured cast member at nine seasons, which has since been surpassed.

In 1991, he had his first major film role, as boyfriend Tony Boer in All I Want for Christmas. Other films in which he has since appeared include Happy Gilmore, The Wedding Singer, Anger Management, Little Nicky, Just Go with It, Daddy Day Care, Good Boy!, and Aliens in the Attic (2009). He has a part in many of Adam Sandler's Happy Madison films, including Grandma's Boy (2006), You Don't Mess with the Zohan (2008), and Father of the Year (2018), and made a cameo appearance in the 2008 film Get Smart.

In the mid-1990s, Nealon played himself in three episodes of The Larry Sanders Show. The most popular episode was titled "The New Writer" when he starts hanging around the office so much that Hank (played by actor Jeffrey Tambor) is worried Nealon is trying to steal his job. Garry Shandling and Nealon had a close relationship. In 1994, Nealon hosted the 13-part series Amazing America on the Discovery Channel.

Nealon had a recurring television role on the 2002–06 CBS comedy Still Standing playing Ted Halverson, the Millers' competitive and religious neighbor. He also appeared as a patient in a mental institution on the first season of Monk. Nealon played Dr. Mark Crest in "Deja Vu", an episode of The Outer Limits television show. It first aired on July 9, 1999, during the fifth season. From 2005 to 2012, Nealon had an ongoing supporting role as Doug Wilson on the show Weeds on Showtime. In 2009–2011 he voiced the title character in Nick at Nite's animated series Glenn Martin, DDS.

In 2002, he hosted The Conspiracy Zone on The New TNN for 26 episodes plus an unaired pilot. In 2004, he hosted the first season of Poker Royale on the Game Show Network. Nealon also hosted several years of World's Funniest Commercials specials on TBS in the 2000s.

In 2008, he published a book chronicling his experiences during his wife's pregnancy, Yes, You're Pregnant, But What About Me?

Starting in 2015, Nealon portrayed Captain Telstar in commercials for Charter Spectrum. From 2016 to 2020, he was a regular on the TV sitcom Man with a Plan.

Since 2017 he has also hosted a YouTube talk show called Hiking with Kevin where he hikes a trail with various celebrity guests; the idea came about when during a hike with Matthew Modine the two of them ran out of breath, and Nealon thought it'd be funny to record their inability to talk. As of 2022, the show is on its fourth season with over 100 episodes. Nealon produces and edits the entire show by himself, recording simply using a selfie stick and a camera drone. In January 2025, Fox News Media announced that they had reached a deal with Nealon to stream episodes on Fox Nation.

In 2022, Nealon published his memoir I Exaggerate: My Brushes with Fame through Abrams Books. He preivously published a memoir called Yes, You're Pregnant, But What About Me? regarding fatherhood.

== Personal life ==
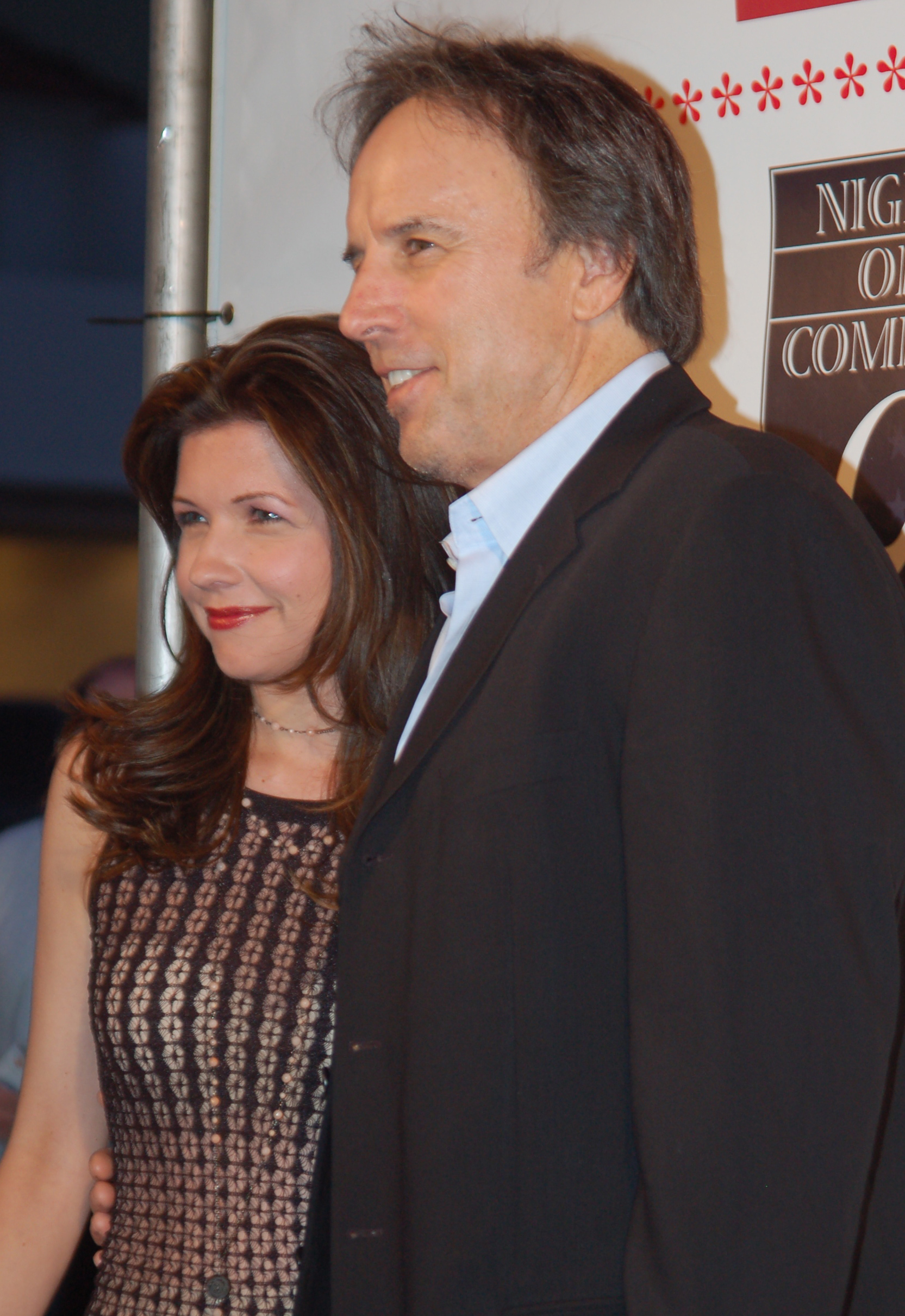
Nealon with wife Susan Yeagley in April 2011

Nealon was dating Jan Hooks when they were both hired by Saturday Night Live. In 1989 he married Linda Dupree, a model and stuntwoman; they divorced in 2002. During this time, Nealon, who has been a vegetarian since 1989, became active in the animal rights movement; he has supported PETA, the Amanda Foundation, Farm Sanctuary, the Washington Wildlife Alliance, The Ark Trust's Genesis Awards, and also Meat Out.

On September 3, 2005, he married Susan Yeagley in Bellagio, Lombardy, Italy. They have a son, Gable, born in 2007. They reside in Pacific Palisades, Los Angeles.

He is distantly related to Daniel Webster.

Nealon played rugby for Fairfield Yankees RFC.

On February 22, 2006, Nealon contributed an opinion article to The New York Times about having his phone tapped and his police records searched by Hollywood private investigator Anthony Pellicano, who was later convicted of crimes including racketeering and illegal wiretapping. It was also revealed in a separate court case later the same month that investigators working for the Ringling Bros. and Barnum & Bailey Circus may also have targeted Nealon for wiretapping in connection with his work for PETA. Nealon holds dual Irish and American citizenship.

Nealon is a fixture on the European melodic rock scene both as a fan, and as a benefactor; in 2019 he used his fame to organize a benefit for close friend and ailing rocker Tony Mills. All proceeds from the festival went towards Mills's medical expenses.

On May 15, 2022, Nealon was awarded a Doctorate of Humane Letters, Honoris Causa, by his alma mater, Sacred Heart University. Nealon also served as the convocation speaker for the graduating class of 2022.

== Filmography ==
=== Film ===
List of films
Year	Title	Role	Director	Notes
1987	Roxanne	Drunk #2	Fred Schepisi	
1989	Cranium Command	Left Ventricle	Jerry Rees; Gary Trousdale & Kirk Wise (opening sequence)	Short film
1991	All I Want for Christmas	Tony Boer	Robert Lieberman	
1993	Coneheads	Senator	Steve Barron	
1994	Felidae	Kong (voice)	Michael Schaack	Uncredited
1995	Jeffrey	TV Reporter	Christopher Ashley	Cameo appearance; uncredited
1996	Happy Gilmore	Gary Potter	Dennis Dugan	
1998	The Wedding Singer	Mr. Simms	Frank Coraci	
1999	Kill the Man	Albino Advocate	Tom Booker & Jon Kea	
2000	Cecil B. Demented	Himself	John Waters	Cameo appearance
2000	Little Nicky	Stanley the Gatekeeper	Steven Brill	
2001	Heartbreakers	Man at the Bar	David Mirkin	
2001	Joe Dirt	Greasy Mechanic	Dennie Gordon	Uncredited
2002	The Master of Disguise	White Collar Executive	Perry Andelin Blake	Uncredited
2002	Eight Crazy Nights	Mayor Dewey (voice)	Seth Kearsley	Animated film
2003	Anger Management	Sam	Peter Segal	
2003	Daddy Day Care	Bruce	Steve Carr	
2003	Good Boy!	Mr. Baker	John Hoffman	
2006	Grandma's Boy	Mr. Cheezle	Nicholaus Goossen	
2008	Remarkable Power	Jack West	Brandon Beckner	
2008	You Don't Mess with the Zohan	Kevin	Dennis Dugan	Cameo appearance
2008	Get Smart	CIA Agent	Peter Segal	
2009	Aliens in the Attic	Stuart Pearson	John Schultz	
2011	Just Go with It	Adon	Dennis Dugan	Cameo appearance
2011	Bucky Larson: Born to Be a Star	Gary	Tom Brady	
2014	Small Time	Irv	Joel Surnow	
2014	Walk of Shame	Chopper Steve	Steven Brill	
2014	Blended	Eddy Warnick	Frank Coraci	
2015	Ghost Squad	Russ	Joel Souza	
2016	Popstar: Never Stop Never Stopping	Gary Sikes	Akiva Schaffer & Jorma Taccone	Cameo appearance
2017	Sandy Wexler	Testimonial	Steven Brill	Cameo appearance
2018	Father of the Year	Peter Francis	Tyler Spindel	
2019	International Falls	Earl	Amber McGinnis	
2023	Late Bloomers	Al	Lisa Steen	
2025	Happy Gilmore 2	Gary Potter	Kyle Newacheck	
2025	Mermaid	Keith	Tyler Cornack	
2025	Inhabitants	Denny	Matt McClung	
2026	Same Same but Different	Siddhartha	Lauren Noll	

=== Television ===
List of television programs
Year	Title	Role	Notes
1985	The Tonight Show Starring Johnny Carson	Kevin Nealon / Guest Comic	Episode: "Charles Grodin/Kevin Nealon/Linda Thorson"
1985	Scarecrow and Mrs. King	Lester Essex	Episode: "Tail of the Dancing Weasel"
1986–1995	Saturday Night Live	Various characters	169 episodes
1990	Monsters	Louis	Episode: "Small Blessings"
1992	The Edge	Greg Williams / Greg / Mr. Williams	4 episodes
1993	Partners	Kevin Nealon	Television film
1993–1996	The Larry Sanders Show	Kevin Nealon	3 episodes
1996	Champs	Marty Heslov	12 episodes
1996	Dr. Katz, Professional Therapist	Kevin (voice)	Episode: "Earring"
1997	Something So Right	Joel	Episode: "Something About Two April Fools"
1997–1998	Hiller and Diller	Ted Hiller	13 episodes
1998	The Wonderful World of Disney	Franklin Fitz	Episode: "Principal Takes a Holiday"
1998–1999	Dharma & Greg	Mr. Clayborn	2 episodes
1999	3rd Rock from the Sun	Dennis Caslow	Episode: "Dick 'The Mouth' Solomon"
1999	The Outer Limits	Dr. Mark Crest	Episode: "Deja Vu "
2000	Bar Hopping	Cuckie	Television film
2000	The Norm Show	Smith	Episode: "Norm vs. Fear"
2001	These Old Broads	Roger	Television film; uncredited
2001	Three Sisters	Terry	Episode: "The Manny"
2002	Monk	John Wurster	Episode: "Mr. Monk Goes to the Asylum"
2003	The Rutles 2: Can't Buy Me Lunch	Kevin Wongle	Television film
2003, 2021	Crank Yankers	OCD Ken / Jack Gravat (voice) Man Ordering Food	2 episodes
2003; 2006	Still Standing	Ted Halverson	5 episodes
2005	Fat Actress	Johnny Knightley	Episode: "Holy Lesbo Batman"
2005	Curb Your Enthusiasm	Kevin Nealon	Episode: "Kamikaze Bingo"
2005–2012	Weeds	Doug Wilson	102 episodes
2006	Campus Ladies	Kevin	Episode: "Pilot"; scenes deleted
2009	University of Andy	Doug Wilson	2 episodes
2009	The Goode Family	Irwin Winslow (voice)	Episode: "Public Disturbance"
2009–2011	Glenn Martin, DDS	Glenn Martin (voice)	39 episodes
2010	American Dad!	I.O.C. Member (voice)	Episode: "Return of the Bling"
2010	'Til Death	I. Stephen Redford	6 episodes
2010	Glory Daze	Marcus	Episode: "Fake Me Home Tonight"
2011	Jimmy Kimmel Live!	Arnold Schwarzenegger	Episode: "Game Night 5"
2012	Hot in Cleveland	George	2 episodes
2012	Franklin & Bash	Lawrence Reynolds	Episode: "Strange Brew"
2012	Isabel	Louis Lorenz	Television film
2013	Drunk History	The Grand Dragon	Episode: "Atlanta"
2013	The League	Chuck Falcon	Episode: "Rafi and Dirty Randy"
2014	Comedy Bang! Bang!	Milton the Milkman	Episode: "Amber Tamblyn Wears a Leather Jacket & Black Booties"
2016	The Soul Man	Ron Saxby	2 episodes
2017	@midnight	Himself	Episode: "January 23, 2017"
2016–2020	Man with a Plan	Don Burns	Series regular; 68 episodes
2017	Idiots	Kevin Nealon	Episode: "Billy Hates PDA"
2017–present	Hiking with Kevin	Himself	Web series
2018	SuperMansion	Helicopter Pilot (voice)	Episode: "Jungle All the Way"
2019	Liza on Demand	Jim	Episode: "Sorry, Not Sorry"
2020	Mike Tyson Mysteries	Gary Stein (voice)	Episode: "The Stein Way"
2020	Family Guy	Kevin Nealon (voice)	Episode: "The Movement"
2020	Room 104	Chris Carrington / Harry	Episode: "Oh, Harry!"
2021	Celebrity Wheel of Fortune	Himself	Episode: "Rachel Leigh Cook, Sherri Shepherd and Kevin Nealon"
2021	Sister Swap: A Hometown Holiday	Uncle Dave	Television film
2021	Sister Swap: Christmas in the City	Uncle Dave	Television film
2026	Bad Thoughts	Dr. Futtrell	Episode: "Bad Impulses"

== Books ==
- I Exaggerate: My Brushes with Fame. New York: Harry N. Abrams, 2022.
- Yes, You're Pregnant, But What About Me? New York: It Books, 2008.

== Awards and nominations ==
Year	Award	Category	Nominated work	Result
1987	Primetime Emmy Awards	Outstanding Writing in a Variety or Music Program	Saturday Night Live	Nominated
2007	Monte-Carlo Television Festival Awards	Outstanding Actor – Comedy Series	Weeds	Nominated
2007	Screen Actors Guild Awards	Outstanding Performance by an Ensemble in a Comedy Series (shared with the cast)	Weeds	Nominated
2009	Screen Actors Guild Awards	Outstanding Performance by an Ensemble in a Comedy Series (shared with the cast)	Weeds	Nominated

Media offices
Preceded by Dennis Miller	Weekend Update anchor 1991–1994	Succeeded by Norm Macdonald
