= Neville L. Johnson =

American attorney

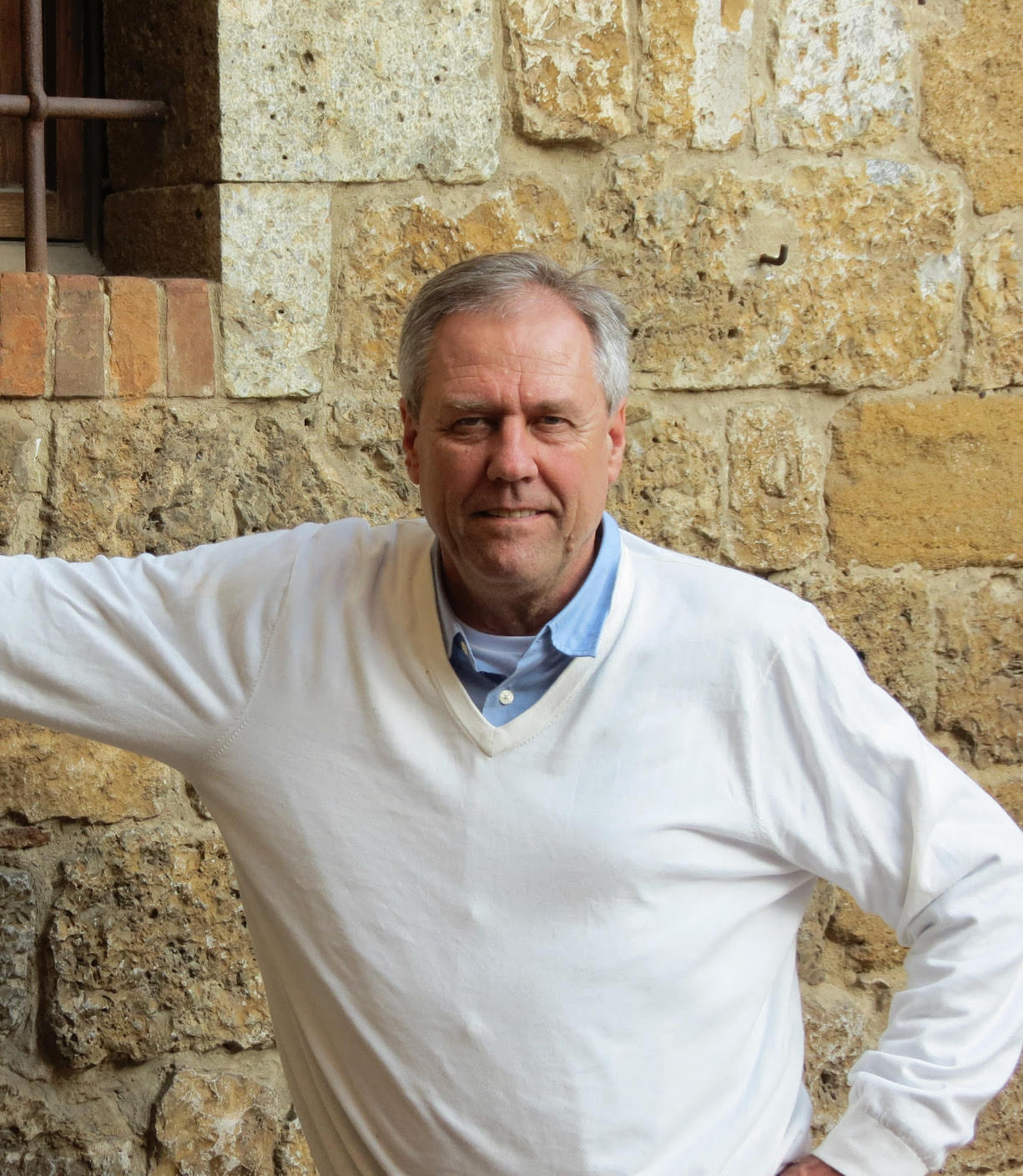
- Born: 1949 (age 76–77)
- Education: University of California, Berkeley (BA); Southwestern Law School (JD)
- Occupations: Attorney; author
- Employer(s): Jonhson & Johnson LLP

Neville L. Johnson (born 1949) is an American attorney specializing in entertainment and media law. He is the senior partner and co-founder of Johnson & Johnson LLP, a boutique law firm based in Beverly Hills, California. Johnson is recognized for his expertise in handling high-profile cases, including the landmark privacy ruling in Sanders v. ABC. His achievements include recovering substantial amounts for artists and contributing to the development of privacy law in California.

== Early life and education ==
Johnson graduated Phi Beta Kappa from the University of California, Berkeley, in 1971 with a Bachelor of Arts degree. He went on to earn his Juris Doctor degree from Southwestern Law School in 1975.

== Career ==
=== Early career ===
Johnson started his legal career handling matters related to The Beatles' catalog for Yoko Ono. The Los Angeles Times referred to him as "one of the most feared litigators in Hollywood" who "secured more than $350 million for actors, writers, and other clients he claims were deprived of their rightful share of royalties and profits."

=== Johnson & Johnson LLP ===
In 2007, Johnson co-founded Johnson & Johnson LLP with managing partner Doug Johnson. The firm has since grown to include partner Dan Lifschitz, senior counsel Melissa Eubanks and Jeff Miles, and Of Counsel Aleeza Marashlian and Aleksandra Hilvert. Johnson & Johnson LLP is known for its litigation support in the entertainment industry.

=== Notable cases ===
==== Sanders v. ABC ====
Johnson obtained a unanimous landmark privacy ruling from the California Supreme Court in Sanders v. ABC.

==== Anthony Pellicano case ====
He represented numerous victims of wiretapper Anthony Pellicano and obtained sanctions against a law firm that utilized Pellicano's services, affirmed in Gerbosi v. Gaims.

==== Class action lawsuits ====
Johnson has filed successful class action lawsuits against studios, record labels, and unions, resulting in the return of millions of dollars to artists. They include $15 million from the SAG-AFTRA Health Fund, $12.7 million from Sony Music, and $8 million from the AFM & SAG-AFTRA IPRD Fund.

=== Representative clients ===
Johnson has represented high-profile clients such as Bad Bunny, Sylvester Stallone, John Lennon, Buddy Holly, Michelle Phillips, Richard Dreyfuss, Mike Connors, Rick Nelson, P.F. Sloan, members of Earth, Wind & Fire, Mitch Ryder, Lloyd Price and others.

=== Teaching ===
Johnson is also an adjunct professor of entertainment and media litigation at Southwestern Law School with his litigation partner Douglas L. Johnson. He has also moderated and taught panels and courses for legal associations, such as the Beverly Hills Bar Association and the Los Angeles County Bar Association.

=== Admissions ===
- California Bar
- United States Supreme Court Bar

== Personal life ==
Johnson is also a writer and musician.

== Publications ==
His publications include:

- “Defamation and Invasion of Privacy in the Internet Age," Southwestern Journal of International Law (2019)
- “Trouble in Tinseltown," Los Angeles Daily Journal (April 23, 2019)
- “My Big Mouth," Los Angeles Daily Journal (March 29, 2019)
- “Entertainment Contracts with Minors in New York and California," NYSBA EASL Journal (2019)
- "The Musician's Business & Legal Guide" (5th Edition, 2017)
