= Killing Hollywood: The Cotton Club Murder =

American true crime podcast

- Genre: True crime
- Format: Audio
- Language: English

Creative team
- Written by: Daniel T. Thomsen and Jeffrey Baker
- Directed by: Nick Hoffa

Cast and voices
- Starring: Juliette Lewis, Christian Slater, and Rainn Wilson

Technical specifications
- Audio format: Podcast (via streaming or downloadable MP3)

Publication
- No. of seasons: 1
- No. of episodes: 8
- Provider: Treefort Media

Related
- Website: www.audible.com/pd/Killing-Hollywood-The-Cotton-Club-Murder-Podcast/B0932P1ZZV

Killing Hollywood: The Cotton Club Murder is an eight-part crime drama podcast starring Juliette Lewis, Rainn Wilson, and Christian Slater. The series is based on the murder of Roy Radin, and was released in May, 2021.

== History ==
The podcast is based on the true story of the murder of theatrical impresario Roy Radin, who was trying to break into the film industry with a movie, titled The Cotton Club, about the New York nightclub of the same name. The film, a 1984 American crime drama, was co-written and directed by Francis Ford Coppola and produced by Robert Evans.

== Production ==
The podcast is produced by Audible and independent podcast company Treefort Media, and was written by Daniel T. Thomsen and Jeffrey Baker. The podcast was recorded during the COVID-19 pandemic. The story was developed by Treefort Media. Treefort Media Founder and CEO Kelly Garner and Treefort Partner Lisa Ammerman are executive producers. The podcast stars Juliette Lewis, Rainn Wilson, and Christian Slater, who are also executive producers.

=== Cast ===
- Juliette Lewis as Lanie Jacobs (8 episodes)
- Christian Slater as Bob Evans (8 episodes)
- Rainn Wilson as Roy Radin (8 episodes)
- Bruce Wexler as Jonathan Lawson (7 episodes)
- Adriana Ducassi as Myriam (6 episodes)
- Alex Quijano as Milan Bellechasses (5 episodes)
- Armand Vasquez as Juan Garcia (5 episodes)
- Robert Maffia as Bill Mentzer (5 episodes)
- Graham Sibley as Tally Rogers (4 episodes)
- Kaytlin Borgen as Betty Rogers (4 episodes)
- Kevin Daniels as Demond Wilson (4 episodes)
- Alex Fazeli as Ed Doumani (4 episodes)
- Reece Rios as Detective Avila (3 episodes)
- Corinne Reilly as Dispatch Operator (3 episodes)
- Lindsay Jean Michelle as Ali (3 episodes)
- Nick Ducassi as Joe Amer (3 episodes)
- Brian Scolaro as Detective Sousa (3 episodes)
- Daniel V. Graulau as Alex Marti (3 episodes)

== Awards ==
Award	Date	Category	Result	Ref.
Webbies	2022	Best Limited Series	Nominated	
Webbies	2022	Best Scripted (fiction)	Won	

== See also ==
- List of American crime podcasts
