= The Conspiracy Zone =

- Also known as: TNN's Conspiracy Zone with Kevin Nealon
- Genre: Comedy
- Created by: Scott Carter
- Written by: Joe Bolster; Tony DeSena
- Directed by: Kelly D. Hommon
- Starring: Kevin Nealon
- Country of origin: United States
- Original language: English
- No. of seasons: 2
- No. of episodes: 26

Production
- Executive producer: Scott Carter
- Production locations: Hollywood, Los Angeles, California, United States
- Running time: 30 minutes
- Production companies: Efficiency Studios; TNN Originals

Original release
- Network: The New TNN
- Release: January 6 – November 10, 2002

The Conspiracy Zone is an American discussion television program about conspiracy theories with a group of panelists, a mix of experts and celebrities. It was a half hour in length and ran for 26 episodes, though there was also an unaired pilot episode.

The show was created by Politically Incorrect producer Scott Carter and hosted by former Saturday Night Live player and comedian Kevin Nealon. The show aired on The New TNN, debuting January 2002, and was described by Carter as "a light-hearted yet open-eyed look into the world of the unexplained". The show was publicized as staying away from serious topics in favor of alien abduction and other more entertaining conspiracies. Celebrity panelists included Ann Coulter, Harlan Ellison, Kathy Griffin, Cathy Scott and French Stewart, among others. Panelists would discuss each conspiracy followed by a vote by the live audience.
