= Carl LaBove =

American stand-up comedian

- Born: July 16, 1958; Fort Worth, Texas, U.S.
- Died: April 23, 2021 (aged 62); Las Vegas, Nevada, U.S.

Comedy career
- Medium: Stand-up comedy, film, television
- Genre: Observational comedy
- Subjects: Current events, human sexuality, satire

Carl LaBove was an American stand-up comedian.

== Life and career ==
LaBove was known performing in such films and television series as Night Patrol, Jumpin' Jack Flash, Roseanne, Seinfeld, Bar Hopping, Hi-Riders, Pauly Shore Is Dead, The Parent 'Hood, The Comedy Store and The Tonight Show with Jay Leno.

LaBove was one of the original "Outlaws of Comedy" and known for being the opening act for his best friend comedian Sam Kinison.

On April 10, 1992, LaBove was traveling in a vehicle behind Kinison when Kinison was fatally injured in a car crash while traveling to a comedy appearance in Laughlin, Nevada.

== Paternity scandal ==
In February 2011, the Toronto Sun reported that Kinison had fathered a female child with LaBove's ex-wife. LaBove had been paying child support for close to 13 years and filed legal papers claiming the child, now a 21 year-old woman, was Kinison's. DNA tests taken from Kinison's brother Bill showed a 99.8% likelihood that Kinison was the father of the unnamed woman. LaBove later stated publicly that he had learned to forgive Kinison for his actions.

LaBove claimed he had a good relationship with the young woman that was, in all likelihood, the daughter of Sam Kinison. LaBove said she showed up at one of his stand-up performances years ago, and he was able to clarify who her biological father really was. LaBove reported losing his driver's license and passport because of not paying in excess of $187,000 in back child support. Learning that Kinison was the child's father and Kinison's death affected LaBove for several years, during which he abused alcohol, saying it was the only way to get through his stand-up comedy appearances, and attempted to commit suicide.

== Death and legacy ==
On April 23, 2021, LaBove died from cancer at his home in Las Vegas.

After learning of LaBove's death, fellow Las Vegas comedian Carrot Top posted on his official Instagram account, "We lost one of the best today. Carl LaBove was not only one of the funniest, talented people but one of the sweetest."
