= Bar Hopping =

2000 film by Steve Cohen

- DVD cover
- Written by: Linda Favila; Anson Downes
- Directed by: Steve Cohen
- Starring: Tom Arnold; Nicole Sullivan; Scott Baio; John Henson; Robert Hegyes; Carl LaBove
- Music by: Steve Gurevitch
- Country of origin: United States
- Original language: English

Production
- Producers: Linda Favila; Anson Downes; Jonathan D. Krane; Kimberlyn Lucken; Edward Oleschak
- Production location: Los Angeles
- Cinematography: Joseph Montgomery
- Editor: Christian Guevarra
- Running time: 89 minutes
- Production companies: J&J Film Company

Original release
- Release: 2000

Bar Hopping is a 2000 American made-for-television comedy film directed by Steve Cohen starring Robert Hegyes, Tom Arnold, Linda Favila, Nicole Sullivan, John Henson, Anson Downes, Romy Windsor, Carl LaBove, Scott Baio and Kevin Nealon.

== Synopsis ==
A myriad of couples try to comprehend love in the bar scene.
