= Pellicano (surname) =

Pellicano is an Italian-language surname. Notable people with the surname include:

- Anthony Pellicano (born 1944), American private investigator and convicted criminal
- Julian Pellicano (born 1980), American conductor
- Helene Pellicano (born 2002), Maltese tennis player
- Henrique Pellicano (born 1974), Brazilian sailor
