= Welcome Back, Kotter =

American sitcom (1975–1979)

- The box set cover for the Warner Bros. Television Favorites DVD release of the series
- Genre: Sitcom
- Created by: Gabe Kaplan; Alan Sacks
- Developed by: Peter Meyerson
- Starring: Gabe Kaplan; Marcia Strassman; John Sylvester White; Robert Hegyes; Lawrence Hilton Jacobs; Ron Palillo; John Travolta
- Opening theme: "Welcome Back" performed by John Sebastian
- Country of origin: United States
- Original language: English
- No. of seasons: 4
- No. of episodes: 95 (list of episodes)

Production
- Running time: 24–25 minutes
- Production companies: The Komack Company; Wolper Productions; Warner Bros. Television

Original release
- Network: ABC
- Release: September 9, 1975 – June 8, 1979

Related
- Mr. T and Tina

Welcome Back, Kotter is an American sitcom starring Gabe Kaplan as a high-school teacher in charge of an ethnically diverse remedial education class. Several students in the class have nicknamed themselves the Sweathogs. Recorded in front of a live studio audience, the series aired on ABC from September 9, 1975, through June 8, 1979. It provided John Travolta his breakthrough role.

== Premise ==
Stand-up comedian and actor Gabriel "Gabe" Kaplan stars as the main character, Gabe Kotter, a wise-cracking teacher who returns to his alma mater—James Buchanan High School in Bensonhurst, Brooklyn, New York City—10 years after graduating, to teach a remedial class of loafers known as the Sweathogs. The rigid vice principal, Michael Woodman (John Sylvester White), who was formerly Kotter's social studies teacher, dismisses the Sweathogs as witless hoodlums. Woodman only expects Kotter to contain them until they drop out or are expelled or arrested. Kotter had been a remedial student and a founding member of the original class of Sweathogs. He befriends the current class and stimulates their potential. Kotter forms a rapport with his students. They begin visiting his Bensonhurst apartment, sometimes via the fire escape window, often to the chagrin of his wife Julie (Marcia Strassman).

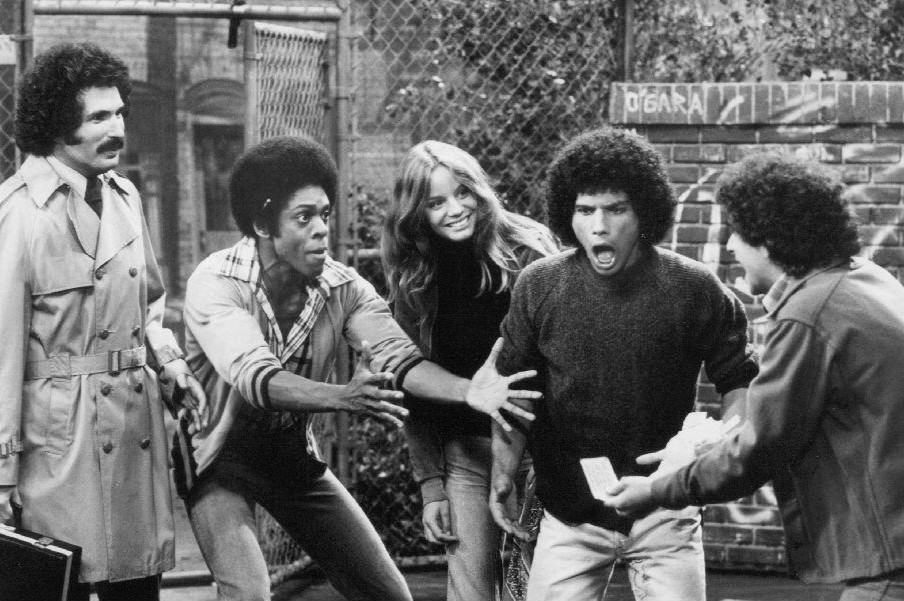
The Sweathogs celebrate a winning lottery ticket as Mr. Kotter looks on.

The fictional James Buchanan High is based on the Brooklyn high school that Kaplan attended in real life, New Utrecht High School, which is shown in the opening credits. Many of the show's characters were based on people Kaplan knew during his teen years as a remedial student, several of whom were described in one of Kaplan's stand-up comic routines "Holes and Mellow Rolls". The character Vinnie Barbarino was inspired by Eddie Lecarri and Ray Barbarino, the character Freddie "Boom Boom" Washington was inspired by Freddie "Furdy" Peyton, the character Juan Epstein was partially inspired by Epstein "The Animal", and the character Arnold Horshack was inspired by someone of the same name.

== Characters ==
=== Gabe Kotter ===
- Played by Gabe Kaplan

Gabe Kotter is a flippant but empathetic teacher who returns to teach at the high school he attended as a student. He is assigned to a class of remedial students known as the Sweathogs. Kotter has a unique insight into the potential of these purportedly "unteachable" pupils, as well as the difficulties and scrutiny they encounter on a daily basis, as he was a "founder member" of the original Sweathogs.

Kotter is married to Julie throughout the series; they eventually have twin girls, Robin and Rachel. Julie, in the episode "Follow the Leader (part 1)", confirms that Gabe is Jewish.

During season four, Gabe Kaplan had contract issues with the executive producer, which resulted in Kotter's character appearing in only a handful of episodes. In season four, the invisible principal John Lazarus retires, and Kotter becomes the vice principal. Though he is said to maintain some social studies training duties, most of that season's shows are filmed outside his classroom, or if inside it, Mr. Woodman is teaching. To minimize Kotter's absence, scenes were shot in either the school's hallway, the schoolyard, or the principal's waiting area. Season four ended the series.

=== Julie Kotter ===
- Played by Marcia Strassman

Julie Kotter is Gabe Kotter's wife and closest friend. Julie's maiden name is Hansen. Though she has a sense of humor, she often wishes Gabe would take matters more seriously. She is occasionally upset with the amount of time he devotes to his students (inside and outside of the school), and she is troubled that he allows them to visit their apartment regularly. In the two-part story "Follow the Leader", the Sweathogs' constant intrusions lead Julie to separate briefly from Gabe and even seriously consider divorce. Mrs. Kotter is originally from Nebraska and holds a college degree in anthropology. She eventually becomes a secretary at Buchanan High School, and later a substitute teacher after Gabe's promotion to vice principal. She makes several references to her "world-famous tuna casserole", a common meal at the Kotter dinner table, which Gabe and the Sweathogs deem inedible.

=== Michael Woodman ===
- Played by John Sylvester White

Michael Woodman is the curmudgeonly vice principal (and later principal) of Buchanan High. He makes no secret of his dislike for the Sweathogs, whom he considers the bottom of the social stratum at his school. He refers to non-Sweathogs as "real" students. When Kotter was a student at Buchanan High, Woodman taught social studies, the same class Kotter returns to teach. The students regularly joke about Woodman's advanced age, and sometimes his diminutive height. Woodman opposes Kotter's unorthodox teaching methods. At one point, he even puts Kotter in front of the school's review board in an unsuccessful attempt to have him fired. As the series progresses, Woodman begins to tolerate Kotter and the Sweathogs marginally. In a season-one episode, Woodman is shown to be a gifted teacher, willing to wear historic costumes and role play in front of the class during his lessons.

=== Vincent "Vinnie" Barbarino ===
- Played by John Travolta

Vinnie Barbarino is a cocky Italian American, the "unofficial official" leader and resident heartthrob of the Sweathogs. He has a need to be the center of attention, as seen when he admits to making it rain in the school gymnasium. In the two-episode "Follow the Leader", Barbarino quits the Sweathogs and drops out of school in anger when Freddy Washington is chosen as the "leader" of the group, though he returns as leader at the conclusion of the episode. Barbarino's prowess with women is sometimes a source of envy and more often amusement, among his classmates. On occasion, he breaks out in a song about his last name sung to the tune of the Beach Boys song "Barbara Ann". He was the first of the Sweathogs to move out on his own, when he got a job as a hospital orderly. In the first episode of the series' fourth season, he has a girlfriend, Sally. Vinnie is Catholic and often describes his mother Margie as a saint. He is a Star Trek fan. Little is known about Vinnie's home life, other than that his parents frequently argue and take turns beating him when in a mutual rage. He shares a bed with his younger brother. The character is seen less frequently in season four, appearing in only 10 of the first 15 episodes of the season; he then exits the series entirely.

=== Arnold Dingfelder Horshack ===
- Played by Ron Palillo

The class clown of the Sweathogs, Horshack is completely comfortable with his oddball, if naïve, personality. Horshack was known for his unique observations and his wheezing laugh, similar to that of a hyena. (Note: Palillo revealed on a 1995 episode of The Jenny Jones Show that it originated from the way his father breathed during the last two weeks of his life as he lay dying from lung cancer.)Academically, he possibly is the smartest Sweathog. He is the only central Sweathog character to be promoted out of a remedial academics class, but he soon returns after feeling out of place. He has an affection for acting and enjoys old movies, particularly 1930s musicals. He eventually marries Mary Johnson, a co-worker and fellow Sweathog. Although his surname sounds like a term for a brothel, he claims it is a "very old and respected name", meaning "the cattle are dying." His middle name (and his mother's maiden name) is Dingfelder.

=== Freddie Percy "Boom Boom" Washington ===
- Played by Lawrence Hilton Jacobs

Freddie Washington is the hip student known as the athletic Sweathog for his skills on the basketball court (although in the episode "Basket Case", Mr. Kotter almost beats Freddie in a one-on-one game). Washington claimed his nickname came from his habit of "pretending to play the bass" and singing "Boom-boom-boom-boom!". His trademark phrase is, "Hi, there" (spoken with a deep voice and a broad smile), and he calls Mr. Kotter "Mister Kot-TAIR". Though often the voice of reason among his classmates, Washington nonetheless is a willing participant in the Sweathogs' various antics and pranks. He also finds success as a radio disc jockey along with another former Sweathog, Wally "The Wow" Wexler (played by George Carlin). At one point, Washington challenges Barbarino for leadership of the Sweathogs and even replaces him for a time until the group grows tired of his dictatorial style.

Washington has an older sister, who got divorced twice while living in Vermont and a brother, Leroy. He has another brother, Douglas, and his father's name is Lincoln, portrayed by rhythm and blues singer Carlton "King" Coleman. Kotter reveals details of his own past to bond with Washington, because, in addition to being a former Sweathog, he was also a former star of Buchanan's basketball team.

=== Juan Luis Pedro Felipo de Huevos Epstein ===
- Played by Robert Hegyes

Epstein was proud of his Puerto Rican and Jewish ancestry. When asked if his mother was Puerto Rican, Juan replies that his mother's maiden name was Bibbermann and that his grandfather "saw Puerto Rico from the ship as he was making his way to America and decided to settle there instead of Miami", making him one of the earliest Puerto Rican Jews. Juan is thus Puerto Rican on his father's side and Jewish on both parents' sides.

He is one of the toughest students at Buchanan High, despite his short stature. He normally walks with a tough-man strut and was voted "Most Likely to Take a Life" by his peers. In season one of the series, Epstein is said to be the sixth of 10 children (when speaking on the phone to his mother, who had failed to notice that he had been missing for three days, she apparently failed to recognize his name and he had to further identify himself as "Number Six"), although in a later episode, he mentions that his mother only gave birth eight times, implying two of them were twin births. Only four of his siblings are mentioned by name, his brothers Pedro, Irving, and Sanchez (establishing that some of his siblings had Jewish names and others Puerto Rican names) and a younger sister, Carmen. Epstein's toughness is downplayed in later episodes, and he became more of a wise guy. He was also known to have a "buddy" relationship with Principal Lazarus, as he often referred to him by his first name, Jack. On a few occasions, when Kotter performs his Groucho Marx impersonation, Epstein would jump in and impersonate Chico Marx or Harpo Marx. Epstein's diminutive height, large hair, and fake excuse notes (always signed "Epstein's Mother") were running gags.

=== Recurring characters ===
==== Rosalie "Hotsie" Totsie ====
- Played by Debralee Scott

Rosie Totsie is the femme fatale purported to have put the "sweat" in Sweathog, though her reputation is largely exaggerated by the Sweathogs' word of mouth. Her promiscuity is at least in part a reaction to the strict discipline enforced by her father, the Reverend Totsie. To restore her good name, and to prove a point, she fabricates a story about one of the Sweathogs getting her pregnant. The character was a favorite among male viewers, but was phased out of the series at the end of the first season when Scott was picked to co-star in the syndicated Norman Lear comedy Mary Hartman, Mary Hartman. She reprised the role in its third season in a 1978 episode, "The Return of Hotsie Totsie", which revealed that she dropped out of school because she became pregnant and had to become a stripper to support her infant child.

==== Judy Borden ====
- Played by Helaine Lembeck

A recurring non-Sweathog character in the earlier seasons, Borden is a straight-A student and editor of the Buchanan Bugle, the school newspaper. She was Barbarino's tutor, and even dated him at one time. Despite her academic superiority, she can easily hold her own in a Dozens contest against any Sweathog.

==== Beauregarde "Beau" De LaBarre ====
- Played by Stephen Shortridge

Introduced as a regular character in the fourth and final season, Beau is a handsome, friendly, blond, silver-tongued southerner who transfers from New Orleans after being kicked out of several other schools. He ends up in Kotter's class. The producers sought a heartthrob who was not a direct knock-off of the "Italian Stallion" trend that was permeating Hollywood in the mid-1970s, and who would improve ratings in the South, where the show's New York City setting was seen as unrelatable. They wanted to retain female viewers, but avoid a Travolta clone. Beau's first reaction to the term "Sweathog" was "That sounds gross." He seems to have a way with women, as shown in later episodes. One of his running jokes involves imparting esoteric and nonsensical sayings, such as "a real man never steps on a pregnant alligator".

== Other recurring characters ==
- Vernee Watson as Verna Jean Williams, Freddie's girlfriend
- Susan Lanier as Bambi, a female addition to the Sweathogs
- Charles Fleischer as Carvelli, introduced as a student foil to the Sweathogs in season two
- Bob Harcum as Murray, Carvelli's loyal and extremely dim sidekick
- Dennis Bowen as Todd Ludlow, a nerdy academic high achiever
- Irene Arranga as Mary Johnson, later became Arnold Horshack's wife
- Melonie Haller as Angie Grabowski, introduced in season three as the only official female Sweathog, but was gone by the end of the season

== Show history ==
Welcome Back, Kotter's first season was controversial. In Boston, the local ABC affiliate (WCVB-TV) initially refused to air the show. The city was going through a tumultuous school busing program that involved widespread protests and riots, and the local affiliate felt Kotter's fictional integrated classroom would exacerbate the situation. The show became an early ratings success, though, and the affiliate relented, picking it up from its fifth episode.

Despite airing on ABC, some earlier episodes were shot at NBC Burbank.

Teachers in other cities had concerns about how Kotter would be portrayed, so producers allowed a union representative on the set to ensure the show protected the image of those in the profession. Kaplan opposed the idea, at one point asking a reporter if a junkman was on the set of Sanford and Son to protect the reputation of junkmen.

Censor concerns about depiction of juvenile delinquency faded after the Sweathogs' antics proved to be silly rather than criminal. Like Kaplan, Hegyes was a fan of the Marx Brothers. Hegyes claimed that he suggested that the Sweathogs be modeled after the Marx Brothers to reduce tension.

Ratings slipped greatly in the third season. Kaplan later attributed the decline to the age of the actors playing the Sweathogs, all then in their mid- to late 20s, claiming that they were no longer believable as high school students. As the series entered its fourth and final season, Travolta, the youngest Sweathog, was 25, while Palillo, the oldest, would turn 30 before season's end.

Kaplan's idea to bring the show in line with the age of its cast was to have Kotter join the faculty of a community college attended by the Sweathogs, but this storyline never materialized. To increase viewership, the Kotters had twin girls, but this did not prove to be enough to regain the show's earlier momentum. The show introduced a female Sweathog, Angie Grabowski, played by Melonie Haller.

Major changes took place in the fourth and final season. Shortly before the season began, the series was moved from its successful Thursday 8:00 pm time slot to Monday 8:00 pm to make way for the impending hit series Mork & Mindy. Much of the writing staff turned over after season three, and Travolta, who had already starred in box-office hits such as Carrie, Saturday Night Fever, and Grease, began to focus more time on his film career. He appeared in 10 episodes, earning $2,000 for each one, and he was billed as a "special guest star". Vinnie got a job as a hospital orderly and his own apartment, and the Murphy bed that came up and down at inopportune times became a running gag. Mr. Woodman was promoted to principal of the school (Principal Lazarus quit to take a "less stressful" job at a high-security prison), and Kotter was promoted to vice principal, purposely moving the show's focus away from Kotter's class. Major off-screen disputes led Kaplan to break his contract and reduce his appearances. To help fill the voids, Stephen Shortridge joined the cast as smooth-talking Southerner Beau De LaBarre, and Kotter's wife, Julie, became a school secretary and occasional fill-in teacher, despite having one-year-old twin daughters. Also in season four, Della Reese was introduced as English teacher and Buchanan High talent-show coordinator Mrs. Jean Tremaine.

Knowing the series was in a nosedive, producer James Komack attempted to spin off a newly married Arnold Horshack into a new sitcom.

== Popularity ==
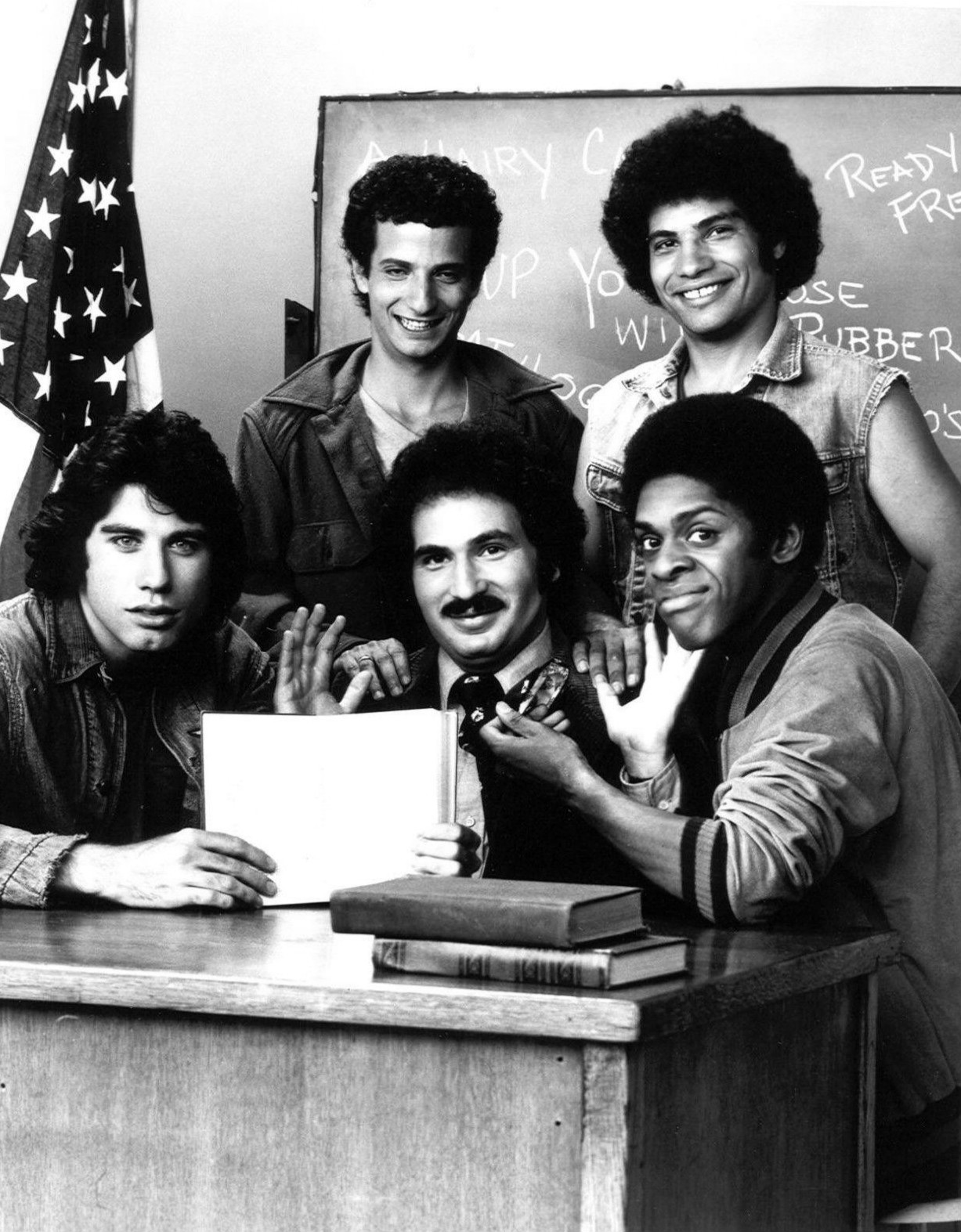
The Cast

The show enjoyed ratings success during its first two seasons, spawning a host of merchandising tie-ins, including lunchboxes, dolls, trading cards, comic books, novels, and even a board game, advertised as "The 'Up Your Nose With a Rubber Hose' Game" in a commercial with a class full of Sweathog look-alikes featuring Steve Guttenberg as Barbarino and Thomas Carter as Boom Boom Washington. The Sweathogs — or at least an impressionist's version of them — even made a crossover appearance with characters from the Happy Days universe on one track (the disco-themed "Fonzarelli Slide") of a 1976 TV-promoted oldies compilation album.

In 2010, the cast, including Gabe Kaplan, Marcia Strassman, John Travolta, Robert Hegyes, Lawrence Hilton-Jacobs, and Ellen Travolta, were honored at the TV Land Award ceremonies. Co-star Ron Palillo was not in attendance, nor were fellow co-stars John Sylvester White (who died in 1988) and Debralee Scott (who died in 2005).

== Theme song ==
The popular theme song, "Welcome Back", written and recorded by John Sebastian, former front-man for the Lovin' Spoonful, became a No. 1 hit in the spring of 1976. The show was originally going to be called Kotter, but that was changed because of the theme song lyrics. Sebastian has said he tried to find a more general theme for the song after being unable to find any reasonable rhymes for "Kotter".

== Merchandising ==
=== Comic books ===
DC Comics published 10 issues of a Welcome Back, Kotter comic book starting in 1976. After its cancellation in 1978, a Limited Collectors' Edition was issued, incorporating a four-page "On the Set" section and photographs from the show.

=== Novels ===
A series of novels based on characters and dialog of the series was written by William Johnston and published by Tempo Books in the 1970s.

=== Action figures ===
Mattel produced a series of 9-inch Welcome Back, Kotter action figures in 1977. Figures produced included Barbarino, Horshack, Epstein, Washington, and Mr. Kotter.

== Episodes ==
Season	Episodes	Originally released	
Season	Episodes	First released	Last released
1	22	September 9, 1975	February 26, 1976
2	23	September 23, 1976	March 3, 1977
3	27	September 10, 1977	May 18, 1978
4	23	September 11, 1978	June 8, 1979

== Home media ==
Warner Home Video released a six-episode Television Favorites collection on February 28, 2006. Due to the success of this release, Warner released the complete first season on DVD in Region 1 on June 12, 2007.

On May 7, 2014, Shout! Factory announced it had acquired the rights to the series. Ultimately, it released Welcome Back, Kotter: The Complete Series on DVD in Region 1 on August 26, 2014, and has since released the second, third, and fourth seasons as individual sets.

As of April 2023, the entire series is available to stream on Tubi.

DVD name	Episode	Release date
The Complete First Season	22	June 12, 2007
The Complete Second Season	23	January 20, 2015
The Complete Third Season	27	May 26, 2015
The Complete Fourth Season	23	August 18, 2015
The Complete Series	95	August 26, 2014

== Nominations ==
Kotter failed to win any major awards, though it was nominated for an Emmy Award for Outstanding Comedy Series in 1976 after its first season; it lost to The Mary Tyler Moore Show. The series was also nominated for three technical Emmy Awards: Outstanding Achievement in Videotape Editing for a Series (to Editors Susan Jenkins and Manuel Martinez) in 1976, Outstanding Art Direction for a Comedy Series (to Art Directors Roy Christopher and James Shanahan) in 1978, and Outstanding Individual Achievement — Creative Technical Crafts (to Dick Wilson for sound effects) in 1979.

== Guest stars ==
Several noteworthy performers enjoyed guest stints on Kotter either during or prior to their widespread fame. James Woods guest-starred in the first episode of season one ("The Great Debate") as Alex Welles, a drama teacher who leads the school debate team ("the Turkeys") in a competition against the Sweathogs. Pat Morita appears in the 1976 episode "Career Day" as Mr. Takahashi. Comedian George Carlin was featured, as was John Astin. Other guest stars included Scott Brady, Ellen Travolta, Richard Moll, Della Reese, and Dinah Manoff, who would work with John Travolta again in Grease.

Groucho Marx was set to have a brief walk-on role in one episode. He arrived on-set, but was deemed to be too sick to appear. Pictures of Marx with the cast were taken, but not released. However, the photographs did appear on the Internet decades later.

== Spin-offs ==
At least three spin-offs of Kotter were seriously considered, but only one ever became a series. The short-lived Mr. T and Tina starred Pat Morita as Taro Takahashi (Mr. T for short), a brilliant Japanese inventor whom he portrayed in one episode of Kotter. The show was not received well by critics and lasted for five episodes on ABC. Talk arose of developing a spin-off built around the Horshack character and his family, Rich Man, Poor Man; Horshack!, but it never went beyond the backdoor pilot stage, shown as an episode of Kotter. In the mid-1990s, Hegyes announced on The Jenny Jones Show that plans were in the works to create a spin-off featuring the Sweathogs, all grown up, minus Travolta's Barbarino, but the project never got off the ground and little information about it was ever made public.

== Broadcast history and Nielsen ratings ==
Season	Time slot (ET)	Rank	Rating
1975–1976	Tuesday at 8:30–9:00 p.m. (Episodes 1-16); Thursday at 8:00–8:30 p.m. (Episodes 17-22)	18	22.1
1976–1977	Thursday at 8:00–8:30 p.m. (Episodes 1-18, 20-23); Thursday at 8:30–9:00 p.m. (Episode 19)	13	22.7
1977–1978	Saturday at 8:00–8:30 p.m. (Episode 1); Thursday at 8:00–8:30 p.m. (Episodes 2, 4-27); Thursday at 8:30–9:00 p.m. (Episode 3)	26	19.9 (Tied with The Incredible Hulk and Family)
1978–1979	Monday at 8:00–8:30 p.m. (Episodes 1, 3-6); Monday at 8:30–9:00 p.m. (Episode 2); Saturday at 8:00–8:30 p.m. (Episodes 7-14); Saturday at 8:30–9:00 p.m. (Episodes 15-19); Friday at 8:00–8:30 p.m. (Episode 20); Friday at 8:30–9:00 p.m. (Episodes 21-23)	78	14.8

== International airing ==
- In Germany, 23 episodes of Welcome Back, Kotter were shown dubbed, but under its original title – first from September 1979 until May 1980 by the ZDF, then again from April to July 1985 by Sat.1.
- In the United Kingdom, 26 episodes were shown from December 1981 until July 1983 on ITV.
- In Australia, the show was broadcast on The Seven Network from June 1976 and rated very well for the first two seasons.
- In New Zealand, the show was screened on Television New Zealand's TV ONE. As in Australia, the first two seasons rated highly.
- In Italy, the show was aired by the Italian TV second channel Rai 2 in the spring of 1980. Since at the time there were only two national TV networks, the rating was high. The show was dubbed, and the title was translated in Italian into I Ragazzi del Sabato sera (Saturday Night Guys), clearly aiming to build on the success of Saturday Night Fever by presenting the show as some sort of prequel.
- In Greece, the show was screened on ANT1 in the summer of 1992, on a morning slot (07:30).

== After the show ==
Kaplan welcomed back Hegyes and Jacobs on his short-lived 1981 sitcom Lewis & Clark. Their characters joked that Kaplan seemed familiar and, being a smart guy, "should become a teacher."

In 1997, Ron Palillo, Robert Hegyes, and Lawrence Hilton-Jacobs reprised their respective roles in a dream sequence in the Mr. Rhodes episode "The Welcome Back Show".

In 2012, both Ron Palillo and Robert Hegyes died. Other members of the cast who have died include Marcia Strassman in 2014, John Sylvester White in 1988, and Debralee Scott in 2005. As of 2026, Gabe Kaplan, Lawrence Hilton-Jacobs, and John Travolta are the only main actors still living.

== See also ==
- Head of the Class (1986–1991)
