= Melonie Haller =

American actress

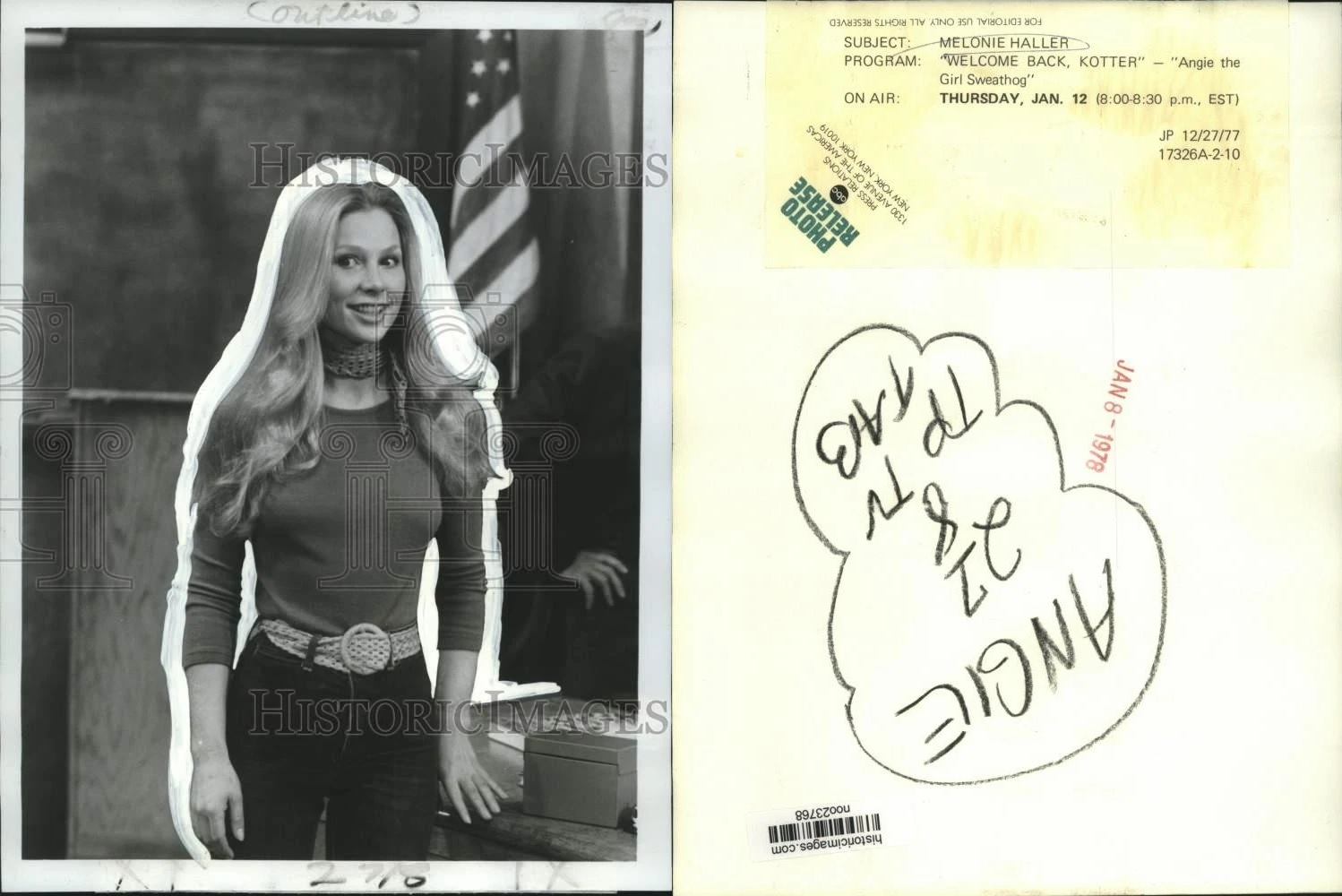
- Haller in Welcome Back, Kotter (1977)
- Born: 1958 or 1959; New Orleans, Louisiana, U.S.
- Occupation: Actress
- Years active: 1971–1980
- Spouse: Karl Ferris (divorced)
- Children: 1

Melonie Haller (born 1958 or 1959) is an American actress known for her role as Angie Grabowski on the television comedy series Welcome Back, Kotter during its third season (1977–78). Before Kotter, Haller had small uncredited roles in The Love Machine and The French Connection, both 1971. Haller appeared in the March 1980 issue of Playboy magazine.

== Early years ==
Haller was born in New Orleans and grew up in Ridgefield, Connecticut.

== Career ==
Haller's portrayal of Angie on Welcome Back, Kotter began on January 12, 1978. She was selected for the part, her first acting role, from more than 100 young women who were tested for it.

== Crime victim ==
On April 12–13, 1980, Haller attended a dinner party at the Southampton, Long Island home of film producer Roy Radin. Haller had been introduced to Radin by photographer Ronald Sisman, and visited his home hoping to revive her stalled acting career. The day after the party, Haller was discovered on a commuter train to Manhattan, unconscious and bloodied. She claimed to have been beaten and raped during the party at Radin's home, and further alleged that the crimes had been filmed by Radin and/or others in attendance. Radin claimed that Haller had consented to sexual games during the party.

The Haller case was widely covered by the New York City press. In 1981, businessman Robert McKeage pleaded guilty to assaulting Haller, and was sentenced to 30 days imprisonment.
