= Robert Hegyes =

American actor (1951–2012)

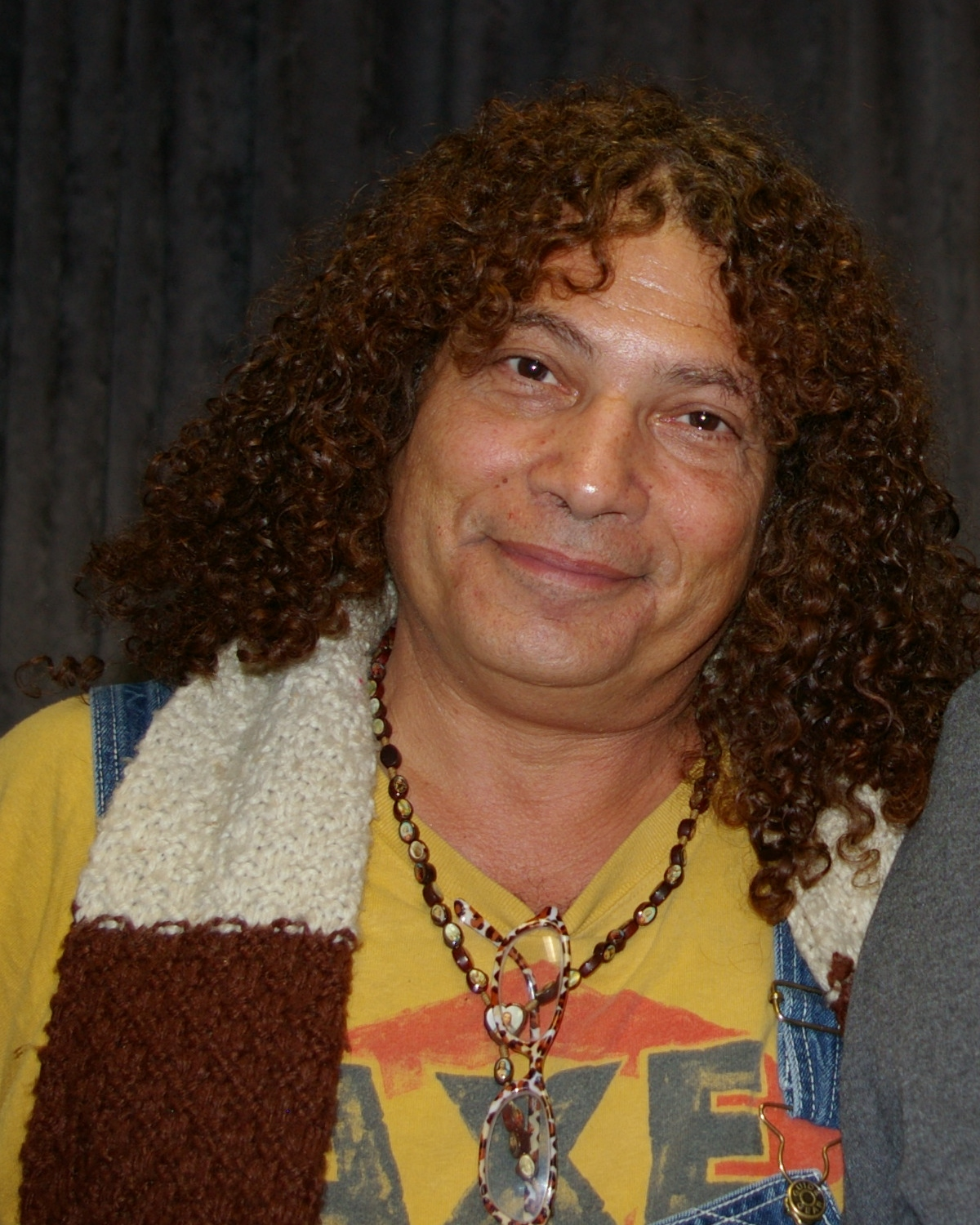
- Robert Hegyes in October 2008
- Born: Robert Bruce Hegyes; May 7, 1951; Perth Amboy, New Jersey, U.S.
- Died: January 26, 2012 (aged 60); Edison, New Jersey, U.S.
- Occupation: Actor
- Years active: 1975–2012
- Spouses: Mary Kunes (m. 1973; div. 1977) Kyle Drummer (m. 1979; div. 1984) Lynn O'Hare (m. 1987; div. 1993)
- Partner: Cynthia Wylie (1994–2007)
- Children: 4

Robert Bruce Hegyes (pronounced Hedges; May 7, 1951 – January 26, 2012) was an American actor best known for his portrayal of high school student Juan Epstein on the 1970s American sitcom Welcome Back, Kotter and as detective Manny Esposito on the 1980s American crime drama Cagney & Lacey.

== Early life ==
Hegyes was born in Perth Amboy, New Jersey in 1951, to a Hungarian-American father, Stephen, and an Italian-American mother, Marie Dominica Cocozza. Hegyes was the eldest of four children (Mark, Stephanie, and Elizabeth).

He grew up in Metuchen, New Jersey, and began acting in high school in the mid-1960s under the guidance of Metuchen High School theater teacher, Barton Shepard. Hegyes attended Glassboro State College (now Rowan University) after graduating from high school. While there, he worked part-time at the Hardee's fast food restaurant in town. After completing his student teaching requirement at Haddon Township High School, he graduated from Glassboro State College with a Bachelor of Arts degree in Speech/Theater and Secondary Education. Hegyes ventured to New York City to pursue a career in acting and soon became a member of a Greenwich Village children's theater group called "Theater in a Trunk". He performed educational theater at U.S. President Theodore Roosevelt's birthplace on East 20th Street, and continued in this vein as a puppeteer with an arm and rod puppet company, playing Mr. Toad in The Wind in the Willows. Robert managed to work a third performing job in Washington Square Park and at the Provincetown Playhouse as a member of the political improvisational guerrilla troupe, "Jack LaRumpa's Flying Drum & Kazoo Band".

== Career ==
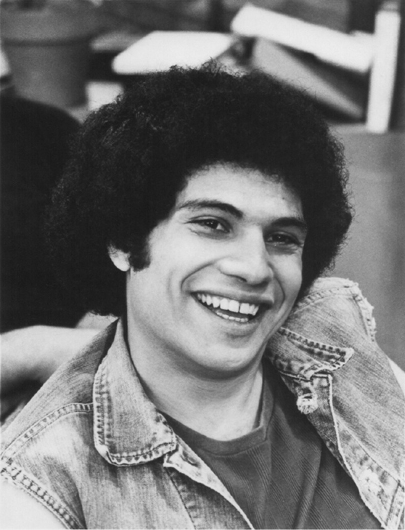
Hegyes in Welcome Back, Kotter, 1976

Within a year of graduating from college, Hegyes was cast to co-star in the highly acclaimed Off Broadway drama Naomi Court, starring actor Brad Davis (star of Midnight Express). After completing the successful Manhattan Theater Club engagement, Hegyes was cast by Tony Award–winning actor Len Cariou (making his directing debut) to co-star in the Broadway drama, Don't Call Back, starring Arlene Francis and Dorian Harewood. While performing on Broadway, Hegyes auditioned for television producer James Komack and was cast to star in what was to become the award-winning ABC comedy, Welcome Back, Kotter. Hegyes portrayed the character of Juan Luis Pedro Felipo de Huevos Epstein (typically referred to as simply "Epstein"). The show lasted four seasons, from 1975 to 1979. Hegyes became one of the show's directors at age 25.

Hegyes guest starred in more than thirty television shows, including Saturday Night Live, NewsRadio, Diagnosis: Murder, The Drew Carey Show, and The Streets of San Francisco. He also appeared in the award-winning Volkswagen Passat commercial "The Chase" for director Kinka Usher. Hegyes appeared in Honeymoon Hotel, Underground Aces, Bob Roberts, The Purpose, and Bar Hopping.

Hegyes made his Los Angeles stage debut as "Chico Marx" in the Westwood and national touring company engagements of An Evening with Groucho. Upon returning from the tour, Hegyes was cast by producer Barney Rosenzweig to star as a series regular portraying undercover detective "Manny Esposito" in Cagney & Lacey. During this time he also appeared on the game show Pyramid from time to time, and on Match Game.

Hegyes became "Artist-in-Residence" at his alma mater, Rowan University, teaching screenplay writing, acting for camera and public speaking, and was a guest lecturer in the Radio/Television/Film & Theater Departments. He was an adjunct instructor at Brooks College in Long Beach, California, where he taught essay writing and public speaking. Hegyes was a California Certified Secondary Education teacher, but had worked infrequently in recent years.

Having returned to live in his hometown of Metuchen, New Jersey in 2009, Hegyes made his last public appearance in early January 2012, performing as "Chico Marx", in three performances of "The Marx Brothers: Flywheel, Shyster and Flywheel," a staged radio play re-creating several episodes of the early-1930s broadcasts.

== Personal life ==
Hegyes was married to Mary Kunes (1973–1977). He then married Kyle Drummer (1979–1984). With his third wife Lynn O'Hare (1987–1993), he had two children, Cassondra (Cassie) (b. 1987) and Mack (b. 1991). Hegyes was in a long-term relationship with Cynthia Wylie (1994–2007), who brought two children to the relationship, Alex (b. 1988) and Sophia (b. 1991) He was the cousin of opera singer Mario Lanza.

=== Death ===
On January 26, 2012, after suffering from chest pains at his home in Metuchen, New Jersey, Hegyes died from an apparent heart attack at John F. Kennedy Medical Center in Edison, New Jersey, at age 60.

== Filmography ==
=== Film ===
Year	Title	Role	Notes	Ref
1978	Just Tell Me You Love Me	Ricky	aka Hawaii Heat / Maui	
1981	Underground Aces	Tico	Directed by Robert Butler	
1992	Bob Roberts	Ernesto Galleano	Directed by Tim Robbins	

=== Television ===
Year	Title	Role	Notes	Ref
1975–1979	Welcome Back, Kotter	Juan Luis Pedro Phillipo de Huevos Epstein	Contract role	
1975	The Streets of San Francisco	Richard "Richie" Martino	Episode: "School of Fear" (S 4:Ep 5)	
1976	Tattletales	Himself	Episode: "March 15, 1976" (S 3:Ep 29)	
1976	Match Game '76	Himself	Episode: "MG76-31" (S 4:Ep 31)	
1976	Cos	Himself	Episode: "Night Club/Bay City Rollers" (S 1:Ep 5)	
1976	The $20,000 Pyramid	Himself	Episodes: "Rita Moreno & Robert Hegyes" (S 4:Ep 39–44); "Anita Gillette & Robert Hegyes" S 4:Ep 50–55)	
1977	The Brady Bunch Hour	Himself	Episode: "Episode 6" (S 1:Ep 7)	
1977	The $20,000 Pyramid	Himself	Episodes: "Kate Jackson & Robert Hegyes" (S 5:Ep 39–44); "Loretta Swit & Robert Hegyes" (S 5:Ep 48–53)	
1977	Dick Clark's New Years Rockin' Eve, 1978	Himself	The taped Hollywood portions with co-host, Suzanne Somers.	
1977	The Love Boat	Danny	Episode: "The Joker is Mild/First Time Out/Take My Granddaughter, Please: (S 1:Ep 6)	
1978	Chico and the Man	Zoltan	Episode: "Raul Runs Away, part 2" (S 4:Ep 14)	
1981	Lewis & Clark	Georgie	Episode: "The Uptight End" (S 1:Ep 5)	
1983	CHiPs	Sweets	Episode: "Fox Trap" {S 6:Ep 16)	
1986–1988	Cagney & Lacey	Detective Manny Esposito	Contract role	
1988	The $25,000 Pyramid	Himself	Episode: "Anne-Marie Johnson & Robert Hegyes"	
1992	Phil Donahue Show	Himself	Episode: "Famous Past Celebrities"	
1995	Saturday Night Live	Himself	Episode: "Spade in America" (S 21:Ep 05)	
1997	Mr. Rhodes	Juan Luis Pedro Phillipo de Huevos Epstein	Episode: "The Welcome Back Show" (S 1:Ep15)	
1998	The Drew Carey Show	Himself	Episode: "What's Wrong with This Episode?" (S 3:Ep 22)	
1998	Diagnosis Murder	Mr. Wolf	Episode: "Murder x 4" (S 6"Ep 10)	
1998	Newsradio	Sal (Credited as Al)	Episode: "Who's the Boss? Pt 2" (S 4:Ep13)	
1999	L.A. Heat	Joe Goldfield	Episode: "Rap Sheet" (S 1:Ep 10)	
2000	Bar Hopping		Television movie	
2001	Black Scorpion	Speedbump	Episode: "Home Sweet Homeless" (S 1:Ep 4)	
2004	Living in TV Land	Himself	Episode: "Dick Van Patten" (S 1:Ep 1)	
2007	TV Land Confidential	Himself	Episode: "Oddballs and Original Characters" (S 2:Ep 1)	
2007	The Singing Bee	Himself	Episode: "Episode 117" (S 1:Ep 17)	
