= Anthony Pellicano wiretapping scandal =

Hollywood wiretapping and racketeering scandal (2002–2019)

The Anthony Pellicano wiretapping scandal was a wide-ranging criminal investigation into the illegal activities of Anthony Pellicano, a prominent Hollywood fixer and private investigator. Beginning with an FBI raid in November 2002, the investigation ultimately resulted in the conviction of Pellicano and numerous associates including law enforcement officers, attorneys, a film director, a software developer, and an FBI special agent. The scandal exposed a network of illegal wiretapping, racketeering, bribery, and witness tampering operating at the heart of the entertainment industry for over a decade.

== Background ==
Anthony Pellicano had built a reputation over many years as a discreet fixer for Hollywood celebrities and entertainment industry power brokers, charging large retainers to solve their legal and personal problems. His clients included prominent figures such as Tom Cruise, Chris Rock, Michael Ovitz, Kevin Costner, and Courtney Love, as well as entertainment attorneys including Bert Fields and Terry Christensen.

Unknown to most of his clients, Pellicano operated a criminal enterprise that included wiretapping the phones of adversaries in legal disputes, bribing members of the Los Angeles Police Department and Beverly Hills Police Department to access confidential law enforcement databases, and intimidating journalists and witnesses.

== Discovery and initial investigation ==
=== The Anita Busch incident ===
The investigation began in June 2002, after journalist Anita Busch, then a reporter for the Los Angeles Times who had been writing about Steven Seagal and Michael Ovitz — both Pellicano clients — discovered her car had been vandalized. Her windshield had been smashed and a dead fish, a red rose, and a sign reading "Stop" had been placed on the car, constituting an apparent death threat.

=== The FBI raid ===
On November 21, 2002, FBI agents raided Pellicano's offices in connection with a separate matter: a threat made against film producer Julius R. Nasso, who was suing Steven Seagal. During the raid, agents discovered two practice grenades modified to function as homemade bombs, military-grade C-4 plastic explosives, firearms, and approximately $200,000 in cash.

Pellicano pleaded guilty to illegal possession of dangerous materials and served thirty months in federal prison. While he was incarcerated, federal investigators continued building the broader wiretapping case.

=== Formal indictment ===
On February 4, 2006, Pellicano was formally arrested on additional charges. On February 6, 2006, in the United States District Court for the Central District of California, he was indicted on 110 counts including racketeering, conspiracy, wiretapping, witness tampering, identity theft, and destruction of evidence. The indictment was amended on February 15, 2006 to include further charges of wiretapping and extortion. Pellicano was denied bail.

In June 2006, the Los Angeles Times reported that Pellicano had performed an illegal background check on a law enforcement official investigating a fake passport scheme involving Pellicano's client, Christophe Rocancourt.

== The wiretapping operation ==
Prosecutors alleged that Pellicano ran a sophisticated illegal wiretapping enterprise on behalf of paying clients, supported by corrupted law enforcement contacts and custom software. Among those whose phones were alleged to have been tapped were Sylvester Stallone and Keith Carradine, while confidential police records were accessed on Garry Shandling and Kevin Nealon.

=== Kirk Kerkorian / Lisa Bonder ===
Attorney Terry Christensen retained Pellicano to wiretap the phone of Lisa Bonder (formerly Kerkorian) during her divorce and paternity dispute with billionaire Kirk Kerkorian, in an effort to disprove her claims regarding the paternity of her daughter. In 2006, Bonder sued her own attorneys, alleging they had been working for Kerkorian and had retained Pellicano to wiretap her phone during the proceedings.

=== Tom Cruise / Nicole Kidman ===
Cruise's divorce attorney Dennis Wasser retained Pellicano during the Tom Cruise–Nicole Kidman divorce proceedings. Tapes of telephone conversations from 2001, made shortly after the announcement of the divorce, were found in Pellicano's offices during the 2002 FBI raid. Wasser was named a person of interest but was not charged. In July 2012, Cruise was separately accused of conspiring with Pellicano to create a wiretap during the divorce proceedings.

=== Steve Bing / Elizabeth Hurley ===
In 2002, billionaire Steve Bing retained Pellicano to investigate his former girlfriend, actress Elizabeth Hurley, in connection with her pregnancy. Separately, Pellicano had obtained a strand of Bing's used dental floss to conduct DNA analysis in the Bonder–Kerkorian paternity dispute, proving Bing was the father of Bonder's daughter. Between June 2000 and August 2002, Bing paid Pellicano $335,000.

=== Extortion of Ron Burkle ===
Pellicano threatened financier Ron Burkle with extortion of between $100,000 and $250,000 to avoid an investigation by Michael Ovitz, another of his clients.

== Convictions ==
=== Anthony Pellicano ===
The jury trial commenced in early 2008, having been delayed three times due to a lengthy discovery process and issues retaining defense counsel. On May 15, 2008, Pellicano and four co-defendants were found guilty of charges including wiretapping, racketeering, wire fraud, and computer fraud. In December 2008, the court denied Pellicano's request for concurrent sentencing. Federal Judge Dale S. Fischer sentenced him to 15 years in federal prison and fined him $2,000,000.

The U.S. 9th Circuit Court of Appeals upheld the majority of his convictions, overturning only two counts for aiding and abetting computer fraud and unauthorized computer access. The most serious convictions, for running a criminal enterprise, remained intact. Pellicano was incarcerated at FCI Big Spring in Texas and later at Terminal Island in California. He was released on March 22, 2019.

=== Law enforcement ===
- Mark Arneson: Los Angeles police sergeant convicted of racketeering for providing Pellicano with access to confidential law enforcement databases in exchange for bribes. Arneson, Pellicano, and Turner were ordered to repay more than $2 million obtained from the racketeering.
- Craig Stevens: Beverly Hills police officer who pleaded guilty on January 11, 2006 to lying about Pellicano's crimes.

=== Legal and business associates ===
- Terry Christensen: Entertainment attorney convicted of racketeering for hiring Pellicano to wiretap Lisa Bonder's phone during the Kerkorian divorce proceedings. Sentenced to three years in federal prison.
- Sandra Will Carradine: Pellicano's girlfriend and ex-wife of actor Keith Carradine, who had originally hired Pellicano in preparation for the divorce, resulting in Pellicano wiretapping Keith Carradine's phone line. She pleaded guilty on January 11, 2006 to lying about Pellicano's crimes.
- Daniel Nicherie: Israeli businessman and previously convicted swindler, sentenced to four years in prison in 2007 after pleading guilty to hiring Pellicano to wiretap a Hollywood businessman. He was the seventh person to plead guilty in the investigation and the fifth to confirm Pellicano's wiretapping activities.
- Abner Nicherie: Brother of Daniel Nicherie, initially convicted for aiding and abetting wiretapping of his business rival's phone, but his conviction was vacated in 2015.

=== Technical associates ===
- Rayford Turner: Phone company technician convicted of racketeering for providing Pellicano with technical expertise to set up wiretaps.
- Kevin Kachikian: Software developer convicted for creating the software used to record wiretapped phone conversations.

=== John McTiernan ===
Film director John McTiernan was convicted and sentenced to prison for lying to the FBI about his dealings with Pellicano.

=== Mark Rossini and Linda Fiorentino ===
Actress Linda Fiorentino, developed a relationship with Pellicano prior to his imprisonment, began dating FBI special agent Mark Rossini in 2006 after Pellicano was charged with new crimes. Fiorentino told Rossini she was researching a screenplay based on the Pellicano case and persuaded him to illegally access FBI computers to obtain classified case files, which she then delivered to Pellicano's defense lawyers. Rossini resigned from the FBI after 17 years as a special agent. He pleaded guilty in 2009 and received a sentence of 12 months' probation and a $5,000 fine.

=== Robert Pfeifer ===
Robert Joseph Pfeifer, at the time an executive at Hollywood Records and a friend of Pellicano, was arrested on February 3, 2006 and charged with unlawful wiretapping and conspiracy. Pfeifer's then-girlfriend, Erin Finn, assisted FBI lead agent Stanley Ornellas in the investigation of Pfeifer and Pellicano.

== Civil litigation ==
=== Anita Busch ===
On May 28, 2004, journalist Anita Busch commenced a civil action against Pellicano alleging harassment, including the 2002 death threat involving the vandalized car.

=== Class action: Kasper v. Pacific Bell ===
A class action lawsuit, Alexander Kasper v. Pacific Bell Telephone Company, was filed in 2006 in the Los Angeles County Superior Court on behalf of people whose telephone conversations were allegedly intercepted when they spoke with individuals whose lines were monitored by Anthony Pellicano and his associates.

The suit targeted Pacific Bell, an AT&T company, over allegations that rogue employees helped facilitate the illegal wiretaps. The settlement class included people whose calls with monitored individuals were allegedly intercepted.

Eligible class members included people who had spoken by telephone with monitored individuals such as journalist Anita Busch, Monika Zsibrita, Michael Davis Sapir, Bo Zenga, Keith Carradine, and others during specified periods between 1999 and 2002.

The case was settled in 2014. Under the final settlement, AT&T and Pacific Bell agreed to pay approximately $1.5 million, with eligible class members receiving checks of more than $4,000 each. Five law firms representing the class received approximately $660,000 in attorney fees. Unused cy-près funds originally earmarked for the Berkeley Center for Law and Technology were redirected back to class members, increasing individual payouts.

=== Subjects of investigation not charged ===
- Bert Fields: The prominent entertainment attorney who regularly retained Pellicano was the subject of a federal grand jury investigation but was not charged. Fields denied any knowledge of Pellicano's crimes, stating he had "never in any case had anything to do with illegal wiretapping."
- Dennis Wasser: Tom Cruise's divorce attorney, who retained Pellicano during the Cruise–Kidman proceedings, was named a person of interest but was not charged.

== Legacy ==
The scandal exposed systematic corruption at the intersection of law enforcement and the entertainment industry, demonstrating how wealthy clients could pay to have the legal system weaponized against adversaries through illegal surveillance. The case prompted significant discussion about the culture of secrecy endemic to Hollywood power structures and the use of private investigators to conduct illegal surveillance on behalf of celebrities and corporations.

Following his release in 2019 and the conclusion of his probation in 2022, Pellicano returned to work as a self-described "negotiator" handling corporate disputes, including work for billionaire Daryl Katz.

== See also ==
- Anthony Pellicano
- News International phone hacking scandal
- John McTiernan
- Linda Fiorentino
- Mark Rossini
