= Roy Radin =

American promoter (1949–1983)

- Born: November 13, 1949; New York City, New York, U.S.
- Disappeared: May 13, 1983 (aged 33)
- Body discovered: Gorman, California, U.S.
- Occupation: show business promoter

Roy Radin (November 13, 1949 – last seen May 13, 1983, remains found June 10, 1983) was an American show business promoter who packaged vaudeville shows and oldies music nostalgia tours in the 1970s and early 1980s. He was probably best known for his attempts to help finance the film The Cotton Club (1984), and as the subsequent victim of a murder-for-hire at age 33. The trial in which four people were sentenced related to Radin's killing became known as "The Cotton Club Murder." The story of Radin's murder became the subject of a book, Bad Company: Drugs, Hollywood and the Cotton Club Murder.

== Career ==
Radin was the son of Broadway promoter Al Radin, who owned a speakeasy and promoted Broadway shows in the 1920s and 1930s. His mother was a showgirl. Roy Radin was a high-school dropout who joined the Clyde Beatty Circus at the age of 16 doing publicity work. A year later, Radin signed George Jessel and J. Fred Muggs as part of his first traveling show. Radin continued to put together vaudeville shows and became a millionaire before the age of 20. Shows were packaged with Roy Radin's name getting first billing (e.g., The Roy Radin Vaudeville Revue, The Roy Radin Variety Show, Roy Radin's Vaudeville '77). The shows featured comedy acts including George Gobel, Frank Gorshin, Jack Carter, Jackie Vernon, Henny Youngman, Joey Bishop, Red Buttons, Godfrey Cambridge, Shecky Greene, Milton Berle, Jo Anne Worley, Jessel, and The Roy Radin Orchestra. Berle and Jessel were among the regular masters of ceremonies. Comedians had a love-hate relationship with the tours, with Radin routinely becoming the butt of jokes. Reflecting on one tour, George Gobel told Johnny Carson on The Tonight Show, "Roy Radin knows as much about show business as a pig knows about church on Sunday."

Throughout the 1970s, Radin's company Roy Radin Enterprises had multiple shows running at the same time. The tours were creatively financed, always showing as sold out but sometimes sparsely attended. Tickets were often sold as benefits for handicapped children, police officers, fire fighters or local causes. Advertisements by local communities were purchased in the souvenir magazine distributed at the venue. The financing was investigated by New York state Attorney General Louis Lefkowitz in 1975 after he found that only 27% of the funds were going to one of the attributed charities. The investigations were dropped, after Radin had made charitable payments to the New York Police Department.

Radin expanded his shows to concentrate not only on comedy revues but also musical acts largely consisting of fading 1950s and 1960s performers. The performances were often in poorly equipped high school auditoriums and gymnasiums requiring lengthy bus rides. Musical performers included The Ink Spots, The Drifters, Eddie Fisher, Johnnie Ray, The Ronettes, Dick Haymes, Jaye P. Morgan, Barbara McNair, Tiny Tim, The Serendipity Singers, The Shirelles, The Marvelettes and Danny & the Juniors.

In April 1980, actress Melonie Haller claimed that she had been beaten and raped during a party hosted by Radin at his Southampton, New York home, and that the events had been filmed. Radin countered that Haller had willingly taken part in sadomasochistic sex games. He was charged with menacing Haller, criminal possession of LSD and cocaine, and illegal possession of a handgun. Radin pleaded guilty to the weapon possession and the other charges were dropped. He was fined $1,000 and given three years' probation on the weapons charge. Businessman Robert McKeage IV, also in attendance at the party, plead guilty to assaulting Haller and was sentenced to 30 days in jail. The cameraman of the alleged sex tape was later found shot dead with his girlfriend.

In October 1980, Radin was questioned by the police about the murder of his acquaintance Ronald Sisman, a drug dealer. Shortly thereafter, Radin came into contact with law enforcement again when, on the day of his second wedding in 1981 (which was also attended by the notorious sadomasochistic art dealer Andrew Crispo), he was accused of sexually assaulting a woman in his luxury villa, Ocean Castle. During a search of his home, the police seized drugs, but due to a lack of witnesses, he was not convicted of the alleged sexual assault. The following year, Radin, who was heavily addicted to drugs, was facing financial ruin and his marriage had fallen apart. In February 1983, he was questioned again by the police about a possible connection to the alleged cult of serial killer David Berkowitz.

According to rumors, Radin was involved in the production of snuff films and cocaine trafficking, but this could not be proven.

=== Cotton Club movie ===
Hoping to diversify his company, Radin worked to establish contacts in the television and movie industry. According to associates, Radin became "obsessed" with the film and Broadway business and began to neglect the vaudeville and music revues. One of Radin's film contacts at this time was film producer Robert Evans, who was introduced to Radin by one-time drug dealer Karen Greenberger (aka Lanie Jacobs). Radin was trying to break into the film industry with a movie about the legendary New York nightclub, the Cotton Club. Radin's financial situation was reportedly quite challenged due both to neglecting his live tours and reported drug-related situations.

The deal being arranged on the film The Cotton Club would have Evans and Radin establishing a production company in which Radin and Evans would each own 45% of the film with the remaining 10% split between two other parties. Radin offered Greenberger (aka Jacobs) a $50,000 finders fee for her efforts which she found unsatisfactory.

== Death ==
As The Cotton Club film financing was being arranged, the 33-year-old Radin was murdered. He vanished en route to a scheduled Beverly Hills conference on May 13, 1983, and was reported missing days later by his personal assistant. His remains were found a few weeks later by a beekeeper and a forest ranger near Gorman, California, about 65 miles (105 km) north of Los Angeles. A King James Bible was found near his body, open to a passage from the Book of Isaiah that reads: “let us eat and drink, for tomorrow we die.”

Several years later, contract killer William Mentzer was among four people sentenced for shooting Radin multiple times in the head and using dynamite to make identification by authorities more challenging. At the trial, Karen Greenberger was convicted of second-degree murder and kidnapping. Her involvement was said to be motivated by anger about being cut out of a producer's role and potential profiting in the Cotton Club movie. As a result, the case was dubbed “The Cotton Club Murder.” Film producer Robert Evans was a person of interest in the Radin investigation. Two witnesses told police that Evans was involved in the murder and when asked under oath if he knew Radin, Evans invoked his Fifth Amendment right against self-incrimination. However, Greenberger later testified that Evans had no involvement in the crime.

Radin's murder became the subject of speculation, as the killer, Mentzer, is said to have had connections to both the Manson Family and the alleged satanic cult of David Berkowitz, and Radin himself may have been involved in such activities. Author Maury Terry suspected Radin of being the possible leader of this cult, operating in the New York metropolitan area.

== In popular culture ==
- The Law & Order episode "His Hour Upon the Stage" is based on the Roy Radin case.
- The Netflix docuseries The Sons of Sam: A Descent Into Darkness explores a speculative connection between Roy Radin and the Son of Sam murders in Episode 3.
