= Stephen Shortridge =

American actor (born 1951)

- Born: October 23, 1951 (age 74); Red Oak, Iowa
- Occupation: Actor
- Years active: 1977–1989
- Spouse: Cathy Shortridge (m. 1976; died 2017)
- Children: 4

Stephen Shortridge (born October 23, 1951, in Red Oak, Iowa) is an American actor.

Shortridge appeared in more than 20 film and television projects throughout the 1970s and 1980s, most recognizably from his role as a Southern high school student named Beau De LaBarre on the television sitcom Welcome Back, Kotter. He has also done over 50 commercials for such products as Mennen, Coca-Cola, and Head & Shoulders. In 1987, he spent one year as a regular cast member on the soap opera The Bold and the Beautiful.

In the late 1980s, Shortridge quit the acting business to concentrate on painting. He presented gallery showings across the United States. He currently makes his home in Idaho with his children. His second wife, Cathy, whom he had married in 1976, died in 2017, leaving him a widower.

Shortridge is also an author. He published his first book in 2011 titled Deepest Thanks, Deeper Apologies.

== Filmography ==
Film and Television
Year	Title	Role	Notes
1977	Fraternity Row	Mel Armstrong	Feature film
1978–79	Welcome Back, Kotter	Beau De LaBarre	Main cast (19 episodes)
1979	The Love Boat	Mark Scott	Episodes: "The Man in Her Life" (Parts 1 & 2)
1979	Marie	Detective Driscoll	Episode: "Pilot"
1980	Charlie's Angels	Cotton Harper	Episode: "Toni's Boys"
1980	Vega$	Henderson	Episode: "Deadly Blessings"
1981	Aloha Paradise	Richard Bean	Main cast (7 episodes)
1981	The Love Boat	Rudy	Episode: "The Girl Next Door"
1981	Fantasy Island	Hadley Boggs	Episode: "High Off the Hog"
1981	Fantasy Island	Jason Martinique	Episode: "Night of the Tormented Soul"
1982	Bosom Buddies	Tim	Episode: "The Slightly Illustrated Man"
1982	The Fall Guy	Dotson	Episode: "Scavenger Hunt"
1982	The Greatest American Hero	Price Cobb	Episode: "The Price Is Right"
1982	Fantasy Island	Mark Twain	Episode: "Natchez Bound"
1983	Lottery!	Richard Stanford	Episode: "New York: Winning Can Be Murder"
1983	Matt Houston	Scott Townsend	Episode: "Target: Miss World"
1983	The Love Boat	Robert Wallingford	Episode: "Here Comes the Bride - Maybe"
1985	Hardcastle and McCormick	Sandy Knight	Episode: "The Birthday Present"
1985	Hunter	J.J. Hendrix	Episode: "Killer in a Halloween Mask"
1985	Murder, She Wrote	Steve Gamble	Episode: "Murder Digs Deep"
1986	New Love, American Style		Episode: " Love-a-Gram/Love and the Apartment"
1986	Airwolf	Greg Stewart	Episode: "Little Wolf"
1986	St. Elsewhere	ER Patient	Episode: "A Room with a View"
1987	The Bold and the Beautiful	Dave Reed	Series regular (50 episodes)
1988	Houston Knights	Elliot Wilde	Episode: "There's One Born Every Minute"
1989	Say Anything...	Ray	Feature film

== Bibliography ==
- Deepest Thanks, Deeper Apologies, Worthy Publishing, 2011, ISBN 978-1-936034-574
