= Italian ship Pellicano =

Pellicano was the name of at least two ships of the Italian Navy and may refer to:

- Italian torpedo boat Pellicano, a torpedo boat launched in 1899 and discarded in 1920.
- Italian corvette Pellicano, a Gabbiano-class corvette launched in 1943 and decommissioned in 1969.
