= Anthony Pellicano =

American private investigator and criminal (born 1944)

- Born: Anthony J. Pellicano; March 22, 1944 (age 82); Chicago, Illinois, U.S.
- Occupation: Private investigator
- Known for: Working as a Hollywood fixer
- Partner: Sandra Will Carradine
- Criminal charges: Illegal possession of dangerous materials (2002); Racketeering, conspiracy, wiretapping, witness tampering, extortion, wire fraud, computer fraud (2008)
- Penalty: 30 months in federal prison (2002); 15 years in federal prison (2008)

Anthony J. Pellicano (born March 22, 1944) is an American private investigator, known as a high-profile fixer.

== Early life and career ==
Pellicano was born and grew up in Chicago, Illinois. After serving in the military, he moved to Los Angeles. Pellicano gained recognition for his work on a John DeLorean case defense.

Pellicano became a private investigator who was often retained by Hollywood celebrities, for a large retainer, because of his reputation as a fixer adept at solving their problems. His clients included Chris Rock, Courtney Love, Tom Cruise, Kevin Costner, Michael Ovitz, and numerous others.

In 1992, Pellicano was hired by Bill Clinton's 1992 presidential campaign to discredit Gennifer Flowers after she claimed to have had an affair with Clinton; he would later be hired to investigate Monica Lewinsky after her affair with Clinton.

In 1993, he was hired by Michael Jackson to investigate the family who accused Jackson of child molestation. Despite being paid a $2 million fee and a Mercedes for his work, he later dropped Jackson as a client.

Pellicano also worked in an advisory capacity on several high-profile criminal matters. He represented Chicago mobster Anthony "the Ant" Spilotro, charged with monitoring Las Vegas casinos and skimming for the Chicago mob. In 1999, Pellicano served as an FBI wiretap consultant in the investigation of Steven and Marlene Aisenberg, whose infant daughter had disappeared in 1997; the charges against the Aisenbergs were later dismissed.

== Criminal convictions ==
In November 2002, an FBI raid on Pellicano's offices uncovered military-grade C-4 plastic explosives and modified grenades. Pellicano pleaded guilty to illegal possession of dangerous materials and served thirty months in federal prison.

Following a broader investigation into his activities as a Hollywood fixer, Pellicano was indicted in 2006 on 110 counts including racketeering, wiretapping, witness tampering, and wire fraud. On May 15, 2008, he was found guilty on multiple counts. Federal Judge Dale S. Fischer sentenced him to 15 years in federal prison and fined him $2,000,000. The U.S. 9th Circuit Court of Appeals upheld the majority of his convictions.

Pellicano was incarcerated at FCI Big Spring in Texas and later at Terminal Island in California. He was released on March 22, 2019.

== Later life ==
Following the conclusion of his probation in 2022, Pellicano returned to work as a self-described "negotiator" handling corporate disputes, including work for billionaire Daryl Katz and producer Joel Silver.

== See also ==
- Anthony Pellicano wiretapping scandal
- Fixer (person)
