= List of The Tonight Show Starring Jimmy Fallon episodes (2015) =

- No. of episodes: 205 (and 1 special)

Release
- Original network: NBC
- Original release: January 5 – December 18, 2015

Season chronology
- ← Previous; 2014 episodes Next → 2016 episodes

This is the list of episodes for The Tonight Show Starring Jimmy Fallon in 2015.

== 2015 ==
=== January ===
No.	Original release date	Guest(s)	Musical/entertainment guest(s)
187	January 5, 2015	Bradley Cooper, Harry Connick Jr.	Big K.R.I.T. featuring Raphael Saadiq
Politicians' New Years Resolutions; Tonight Show Do Not Read; Bradley Cooper's birthday; Jimmy gives Bradley Cooper a present; Bradley Cooper plays air guitar version of "Down by the River"; Harry Connick Jr. brings Jimmy a present; Harry Connick Jr. and Jimmy recreate puppeteering scene; Big K.R.I.T. featuring Raphael Saadiq performed "Soul Food"
188	January 6, 2015	Nicole Kidman, Patton Oswalt	The War on Drugs
Athlete Quotes; Rejected Girl Scouts Cookies; Tonight Show Pros & Cons: Making a New Year's Resolution; Box of Lies (Nicole Kidman); The War on Drugs performed "An Ocean in Between the Waves"
189	January 7, 2015	Liam Neeson, Fred Armisen & Carrie Brownstein	Simon Amstell
People who have never been on online dating; Tonight Show Puppy Predictors: 2015 College Football National Championship; Liam Neeson and Jimmy arm wrestle
190	January 8, 2015	Lena Dunham, J. K. Simmons	Ghostface Killah with The Revelations featuring Kandace Springs
Erotic novels by athletes; Hashtag the Panda rolls down the stairs; Tonight Show #hashtags: #AwkwardDate; Pictionary (Jimmy Fallon & J. K. Simmons Vs. Lena Dunham & Steve Higgins); J. K. Simmons' birthday; J. K. Simmons takes a selfie with Jimmy; J. K. Simmons and Jimmy sing with low voices; Ghostface Killah with The Revelations featuring Kandace Springs performed "Love Don't Live Here No More"
191	January 9, 2015	Don Cheadle, Kate Bosworth	Lecrae
Politician Comments; Hillary Rodham Clinton Quote; Boston Time Capsule; Tonight Show Superlatives; Thank You Notes; Pleather & Jerry; Lecrae performed "Welcome to America"
192	January 12, 2015	Charlie Day, Jeff Musial	Darius Rucker
Audience members on an online date; Tonight Show In Reply To; Tonight Show 5–Second Summaries (Charlie Day); Darius Rucker performed "Homegrown Honey"
193	January 13, 2015	Chris Hemsworth, Sienna Miller	Joey Bada$$
Tonight Show Pros & Cons: Having a Self-Driving Car; Water War (Chris Hemsworth); Joey Bada$$ performed "Like Me"
194	January 14, 2015	Gwyneth Paltrow, Josh Gad	Panda Bear
Mitch McConnell Quotes; Tonight Show Audience Suggestion Box (including Roy Bongo and Black Simon & Garfunkel); Gwyneth Paltrow sings Broadway versions of hip-hop songs; Panda Bear performed "Boys Latin"
195	January 15, 2015	Kevin Hart, Jay Baruchel	Meghan Trainor
Fake IMDB Page; Space and Science Subcommittee Agenda; Tonight Show #hashtags: #WorstCarIEverHad; Slapjack (Kevin Hart); Meghan Trainor performed "Lips Are Movin"
196	January 16, 2015	Brian Williams, Victoria Justice, Joshua Topolsky	N/A
Cuba Tourism Slogans; Tonight Show Superlatives; Thank You Notes; Jimmy gives Brian Williams a present; Jimmy, Victoria Justice, and Steve Higgins do a shot-ski; Joshua Topolsky shows Jimmy tech items
197	January 19, 2015	Jennifer Lopez, Anthony Mackie	Iliza Shlesinger
Rob Gronkowski Quote; The Smurfs dubbed with Homeland; Jimmy counts down top/bottom songs in the country; Catchphrase (Jimmy Fallon & Jennifer Lopez Vs. Anthony Mackie & Steve Higgins)
198	January 20, 2015	Jude Law, Keri Russell	Fall Out Boy
Hard GED Questions; Questlove's birthday; Tonight Show Pros & Cons: Obama's State of the Union Address; Jimmy promotes MasterCard Priceless Surprises; Inflatable Flip Cup (Keri Russell); Fall Out Boy performed "Centuries"
199	January 21, 2015	Jennifer Aniston, Bill Gates, Mario Batali	N/A
Millennial Changes; Tonight Show Lip Flip (Jennifer Aniston); Bill Gates brings Jimmy a cap and bumper sticker; Bill Gates and Jimmy drink water made from sewage
200	January 22, 2015	Blake Shelton, Bob Costas	Mötley Crüe
Hot Sax; Roger Wicker Quotes; Tonight Show Splittin' the Diff; Tonight Show #hashtags: #MyTouchdownDance; Tonight Show Whisper Challenge (Blake Shelton); Mötley Crüe performed "Girls, Girls, Girls"
201	January 23, 2015	Ryan Seacrest, Taraji P. Henson	Maddie & Tae
Joe Biden Faces; Putin voice-over; Thank You Notes; Charades (Jimmy Fallon & Ryan Seacrest Vs. Tariq & Taraji P. Henson); Maddie & Tae performed "Fly"

=== February ===
No.	Original release date	Guest(s)	Musical/entertainment guest(s)
Special	February 1, 2015	Will Ferrell, Kevin Hart, Super Bowl Champion New England Patriots	Ariana Grande
From the Orpheum Theatre in Phoenix, Arizona: Tonight Show The Scooter Pole; Tonight Show Superlatives; Jimmy Fallon, The Roots, and various musical acts performed "We Are the Champions"; Steve Higgins sends out to first commercial with Arnold Schwarzenegger; Lip Sync Battle (Will Ferrell, Kevin Hart, appearance by Drew Barrymore); The New England Patriots improve Will Ferrell's sweatshirt; Ariana Grande performed "One Last Time"; Note: This episode counted as a special and not a regular episode.
202	February 2, 2015	Michael Keaton, Gwen Stefani	Gwen Stefani
From Universal Studios Hollywood: The Fresh Host of Tonight cold open (appearances by Alfonso Ribeiro and DJ Jazzy Jeff); Lesser-Known LA Attractions; Brian Williams raps "Who Am I (What's My Name)?"; Tonight Show Celebrity Photobomb (at Super Bowl XLIX, with Chris Pratt and Chris Evans); Tonight Show Kid Theater (Michael Keaton); Gwen Stefani performed a medley of songs
203	February 3, 2015	Ellen DeGeneres, Neil Young	Neil Young
From Universal Studios Hollywood: Tonight Show Mom & Pop Quiz: Grammy Edition; Doc Severinsen sits in with The Roots; Tonight Show Pros & Cons: Doing The Tonight Show in Los Angeles; Jimmy performs as Neil Young (appearance by Neil Young); Ellen DeGeneres gives audience a $100 Visa gift card; Password (Jimmy Fallon & Ellen DeGeneres Vs. Reese Witherspoon & Steve Carell); Neil Young promotes Pono music player; Neil Young performed "Who's Gonna Stand Up?"
204	February 4, 2015	Vin Diesel, Carl Reiner, Kobe Bryant	Iggy Azalea and Jennifer Hudson
From Universal Studios Hollywood: Hillary Rodham Clinton Tweets; debut of Sports Illustrated Swimsuit Issue cover (appearance by Hannah Davis); Saved by the Bell segment (appearance by Saved by the Bell cast); exclusive trailer for Furious 7; Carl Reiner gives Jimmy a space pen; Iggy Azalea and Jennifer Hudson performed "Trouble"
205	February 5, 2015	Will Smith, Rosamund Pike	Jack White
From Universal Studios Hollywood: Universal Studios Hollywood Backlot; Tonight Show I've Got Good News and Good News; school mascots have dance-off with Hashtag the Panda; Jimmy jumps through the Randy's Donuts sign; Albert Brooks makes a surprise appearance; Thank You Notes; Will Smith and Jimmy performed an original song; Rosamund Pike brings Jimmy a present; Jack White performed "That Black Bat Licorice"
206	February 9, 2015	Jamie Dornan, Hannah Davis	Sheppard
Senior Citizen Quotes; Freestylin' with The Roots; Tonight Show Fifty Accents of Grey; Sheppard performed "Geronimo"
207	February 10, 2015	Dakota Johnson, Anthony Anderson	Mark Ronson featuring Mystikal
2 Chainz Campaign Slogans; Fish Quotes; Tonight Show Pros & Cons: Seeing the Movie Fifty Shades of Grey; Jimmy gives Dakota Johnson a trophy; Anything Can Be Sexy; Mark Ronson featuring Mystikal performed "Feel Right"
208	February 11, 2015	Hugh Grant, Charles Barkley	Kyle Kinane
Delayed Films; Fifty Shades of Grey Products; Tonight Show Superlatives; Hallway Golf (Hugh Grant, Charles Barkley)
209	February 12, 2015	Colin Firth, Jack McBrayer & Triumph the Insult Comic Dog	The Weeknd
Jeb Bush E-mails; Presidential Lie Detector; Chris Christie Quotes; Tonight Show Superlatives (appearance by various sports players); Tonight Show #hashtags: #WhyImSingle; Catchphrase (Jimmy Fallon & Triumph the Insult Comic Dog Vs. Colin Firth & Jack McBrayer); The Weeknd performed "Earned It"
210	February 13, 2015	Samuel L. Jackson, Norman Reedus	Jessie J
Jimmy wishes everyone Happy Holidays; Yelp Lowest-Rated Restaurants; Jimmy gives away two tickets to Paul McCartney concert; Thank You Notes; Face Breakers (Norman Reedus); Jessie J performed "Masterpiece"
211	February 16, 2015	Edward Norton, Craig Robinson	Chris Brown and Tyga
Snowstorm Reactions; "Love Is Like a Basketball" song; Jimmy reminisces about the Saturday Night Live 40th anniversary special and after party; Edward Norton comes out early; Tonight Show Do Not Play; Chris Brown and Tyga performed "Ayo"
212	February 17, 2015	Taylor Swift, John Oliver	Imagine Dragons
Republican Quotes; Tonight Show Pros & Cons: Watching the Academy Awards; Jimmy debuts Ben & Jerry's The Tonight Show Starring Jimmy Fallon ice cream (appearance by Ben & Jerry); Taylor Swift and Jimmy do sketches of each other; NYC Fan Dance Cam; Imagine Dragons performed "Shots"
213	February 18, 2015	Sigourney Weaver, Andy Cohen	Ella Henderson
What owners and their dogs are thinking; Tonight Show Dictionary; People try The Tonight Show Starring Jimmy Fallon ice cream; Andy Cohen brings Jimmy taglines; Ella Henderson performed "Ghost"
214	February 19, 2015	Martin Short, Ruth Wilson	Walk the Moon
Tonight Show #hashtags: #AwwHellSnow; Tonight Show Word Sneak (Martin Short); Ruth Wilson reenacts Platoon scene; Walk the Moon performed "Shut Up and Dance"
215	February 20, 2015	Kevin Bacon, Amy Sedaris	Nick Jonas
Tonight Show Who You Textin'?; Thank You Notes; Pictionary (Jimmy Fallon & Nick Jonas Vs. Kevin Bacon & Don Cheadle); Amy Sedaris returns item she stole from dressing room; Nick Jonas performed "Chains"
216	February 23, 2015	Christina Aguilera, Jeff Probst	Kid Rock
Jimmy calls his parents; Oscars given after the show; Tonight Show Screengrabs; Tonight Show Wheel of Musical Impressions (Christina Aguilera); Kid Rock performed "First Kiss"
217	February 24, 2015	Josh Duhamel, Gabrielle Union	Charlie Wilson
Questlove and Tariq re-enact a scene from The Bachelor; Tonight Show Pros & Cons: The Deep Freeze; Gabrielle Union and Josh Duhamel sing various songs; Random Object Shootout (Gabrielle Union); Charlie Wilson performed "Touched by an Angel"
218	February 25, 2015	Ice-T, Andrew Rannells	Lupe Fiasco
Homeland Security Shutdown; Mark Kelley is a cool babysitter; Tonight Show Celebrity Whispers...; Sound-off (Ice-T); Ice-T does voice-overs; Sound-off (Andrew Rannells); Andrew Rannells and Jimmy performed "True"; Lupe Fiasco performed "Little Death"
219	February 26, 2015	James Spader, Margot Robbie	Tobias Jesso Jr.
C-SPAN Promo; Public Confessions; Tonight Show #hashtags: #EmailFail; Flip Cup (Margot Robbie); Tobias Jesso Jr. performed "How Could You Babe"
220	February 27, 2015	Josh Hutcherson, Abbi Jacobson & Ilana Glazer, Chef Michael Schlow	N/A
Tariq and Jimmy's Inner Thoughts; Couples' Quotes; Weekly Snapshot; Thank You Notes; Josh Hutcherson and Jimmy performed "Boot Scootin' Boogie"; Bubble Hockey (Josh Hutcherson); Abbi Jacobson does impression of SNL character; Tonight Show Truth or Truth (Abbi Jacobson & Ilana Glazer)

=== March ===
No.	Original release date	Guest(s)	Musical/entertainment guest(s)
221	March 2, 2015	Ryan Reynolds, Terrence Howard	Kelly Clarkson
Tourism Slogans; Tim Cook Fun Time; Jimmy announces Hashtag the Panda stuffed animal, and Hashtag gives audience stuffed animals; Kelly Clarkson and Jimmy performed a medley of songs; Egg Russian Roulette (Ryan Reynolds); Kelly Clarkson performed "Heartbeat Song"
222	March 3, 2015	Judi Dench, Ansel Elgort	Gza with Tom Morello
Sylvester Stallone Phone Call; Kamal Gray advertises social faux pas; Jimmy advertises writers' book; Tonight Show Pros & Cons: Watching Empire; Tonight Show Kids Letters; Jimmy reads Oscar cue cards; Gza with Tom Morello performed "The Mexican"
223	March 4, 2015	Danny DeVito, Zoë Kravitz	Artie Lange
Rabbit Quotes; Tonight Show Audience Suggestion Box (appearance by Elwood Edwards, saying phrases; Two Really Fun Men help audience member have fun; Robin Braun administers oath to United States Navy Reserve, and makes Jimmy an honorary member of the Reserve); Danny DeVito and Jimmy eat cookies; Danny DeVito and Jimmy shoot troll foot video; Giant Beer Pong (Zoë Kravitz)
224	March 5, 2015	Hugh Jackman, Tiffani Thiessen	Hozier
People Articles; Scott Seymour; Tonight Show #hashtags: #SpringBreakRaps; Hugh Jackman and Jimmy try on mullets; Musical Beers (Jimmy Fallon, Bobby Moynihan, Kate McKinnon, Colin Jost, Chris Hemsworth, Hugh Jackman); Tiffani Thiessen brings Jimmy chocolate peanut butter bites; Hozier performed "Work Song"
225	March 16, 2015	Jim Parsons, Miles Teller	Wiz Khalifa featuring Charlie Puth
Jimmy talks to aliens; Tonight Show Do Not Read; Catchphrase (Jimmy Fallon & Jim Parsons Vs. Miles Teller & Wiz Khalifa); Wiz Khalifa featuring Charlie Puth performed "See You Again"
226	March 17, 2015	Jennifer Garner, Eugene Levy	Modest Mouse
Wrestling Match Nicknames; Jimmy sorts out Dancing with the Stars confusion; Jimmy shows video of his daughter; Tonight Show Pros & Cons: Celebrating St. Patrick's Day; Jennifer Garner brings green beer; Tonight Show Rock, Paper, Scissors, Pie! (Jennifer Garner); Modest Mouse performed "Lampshades on Fire"
227	March 18, 2015	Will Ferrell, Chelsea Peretti	Boots
Playboy Cover Stories; Tonight Show The Big Question; Jimmy counts down top/bottom songs in the country; Will Ferrell is the new face of Little Debbie snack cakes; Will Ferrell knows difference between baked potato and zebra cake; Jimmy promotes Little Debbie snack cakes; Will Ferrell performed Little Debbie jingle; Chelsea Peretti shows Jimmy how to deal with a pat-down; Boots performed "I Run Roulette"
228	March 19, 2015	Ben Stiller, Tim Gunn	Rixton
Writer upset about Internet Explorer; Tonight Show #hashtags: #IOnceOverheard; Jimmy announces Lexus contest; Tonight Show Emotional Interview (Ben Stiller); Rixton performed "Hotel Ceiling"
229	March 20, 2015	Jeremy Piven, Ariana Grande, Joshua Topolsky	N/A
Aaron Schock Statistics; Keys to the Game: Kentucky Vs. Hampton; Andy Summers sits in with The Roots; Thank You Notes; Ew! sketch (Ariana Grande); Piven or Pivout (Jeremy Piven); Ariana Grande and Jimmy performed "Beauty and the Beast"; Ariana Grande teaches Jimmy Japanese
230	March 23, 2015	January Jones, Bubba Watson	Brandon Flowers
Roxanne Chalifoux sits in with The Roots; Jimmy gives Roxanne Chalifoux a gift basket and Taylor Swift tickets; Tonight Show In Reply To; Pie Golf (Jimmy Fallon Vs. Bubba Watson, January Jones throws pies); Jimmy brings Bubba Watson burritos; Brandon Flowers performed "Can't Deny My Love"
231	March 24, 2015	Elizabeth Banks, Ronda Rousey	Little Big Town
Tonight Show Pros & Cons: March Madness; Freestylin' with The Roots; Ronda Rousey shows Jimmy a wrestling move; Little Big Town performed "Girl Crush"
232	March 25, 2015	Mitt Romney, Grace Helbig	G-Unit
Fictional characters people like more than politicians; Coloring Book for Adults; Tonight Show Screengrabs; Mitt Romney talks to himself in dressing room mirror; Mitt Romney and Jimmy bet on wrestling match; G-Unit performed "I'm Grown"
233	March 26, 2015	Alan Cumming, Carey Mulligan	Ludacris
Tonight Show Just the Facts; Jimmy announces his Madam Tussauds wax figure; Jimmy performed "Barbara Ann" with five wax figures; Tonight Show #hashtags: #HowIQuit; Jimmy gives Carey Mulligan a Hooters shirt and fleece cap; Ludacris performed "Grass Is Always Greener"
234	March 27, 2015	Will Forte, Adam Horovitz, Jeremy Wade	N/A
Celebrities who have released weed; Jimmy Fallon wax figure sits in with The Roots; Thank You Notes; Jimmy promotes Samsung SUHD television; Will Forte performed an original song
235	March 30, 2015	Helen Mirren, Oscar Isaac	Wale
BuzzFeed News Stories; Lin-Manuel Miranda freestyle raps Jimmy's outgoing message; Tonight Show Popular Mathematics; exclusive first look at the film Spy; Jimmy gives Helen Mirren crocks; Helen Mirren and Jimmy suck helium balloons; Wale performed "Girls on Drugs"
236	March 31, 2015	Ethan Hawke, Willie & Korie Robertson	alt-J
Jimmy tells story about his father-in-law; Tonight Show Puppy Predictors: 2015 Final Four Edition; Ethan Hawke and Jimmy performed bedtime songs as Bob Dylan; alt-J performed "Every Other Freckle"

=== April ===
No.	Original release date	Guest(s)	Musical/entertainment guest(s)
237	April 1, 2015	Pharrell Williams, Roma Downey & Mark Burnett	Milky Chance
Hillary Rodham Clinton Headlines; Scott Walker Campaign Ad; Tonight Show Audience Suggestion Box (Where My Peeps At?, Tariq does Game of Thrones rap); Afro & Deziak (Pharrell Williams); Jimmy tries on a beard; Milky Chance performed "Flashed Junk Mind"
238	April 2, 2015	First Lady Michelle Obama, Matthew Morrison	The Smashing Pumpkins
Bob Menendez Quotes; Hootie & the Blowfish Quotes; Tonight Show #hashtags: #BestPrankEver; The Evolution of Mom Dancing Part 2 with First Lady Michelle Obama; The Smashing Pumpkins performed "Drum + Fife"
239	April 3, 2015	Ricky Gervais, Jordana Brewster	Elle King
Fans of Full House Quotes; Tonight Show Local News Roulette; Boz Scaggs sits in with The Roots; Thank You Notes; Tonight Show Funny Face Off (Ricky Gervais, Jordana Brewster); Jordana Brewster brings Jimmy giant chocolate eggs; Elle King performed "Ex's and Oh's"
240	April 6, 2015	Michael Douglas, Kat Dennings	St. Vincent
Jimmy offers congrats and condolences to Wisconsin Badgers and Duke Blue Devils; Tonight Show Picture This; Charades (Jimmy Fallon & Kat Dennings Vs. Michael Douglas & Jon Cryer); St. Vincent performed "Teenage Talk"
241	April 7, 2015	Louis C.K., Sophia Bush	Who Is Fancy
CIA opinions on television series; The Fan and the Furious; Tonight Show Pros & Cons: Being in Space for a Year; Who Is Fancy performed "Goodbye"
242	April 8, 2015	Julia Louis-Dreyfus, Scott Eastwood	Flo Rida
Jimmy and Steve Higgins try Carey Mulligan's spaghetti bolongnese; Tonight Show Superlatives; Tonight Show Whisper Challenge (Julia Louis-Dreyfus); Flo Rida performed "GDFR"
243	April 9, 2015	Madonna, Nikolaj Coster-Waldau	Madonna
Tonight Show What's the Beef?; Game of Thrones footage edited to "I'm So Excited"; Tonight Show #hashtags: #MyCrazyFamily; Jimmy Fallon, Madonna & The Roots sing "Holiday" with classroom instruments; Madonna did a stand-up comedy bit; Madonna performed "##### I'm Madonna"
244	April 10, 2015	Kevin James, Vanessa Hudgens	Dan White
Rand Paul Quotes; Star Wars Changes; Jimmy talks about an experience at a New York Yankees game; Thank You Notes; Tonight Show Lexus Vine Challenge; Last Call Saloon (Kevin James)
245	April 20, 2015	LL Cool J, Rose Byrne	Big Sean
Tonight Show Do Not Play; Pictionary (Jimmy Fallon & Big Sean Vs. LL Cool J & Rose Byrne); Big Sean performed "One Man Can Change the World"
246	April 21, 2015	Blake Lively, Brian Grazer	Nate Bargatze
Kamal Gray advertises Earth Day faux pas; "Weird Al" Yankovic sits in with The Roots; Jimmy announces mobile game Tedzy; Tonight Show Pros & Cons: Using a Pot Delivery Service; Say Anything (Blake Lively); Jimmy hides heart photos of himself in Brian Grazer's house
247	April 22, 2015	Russell Crowe, Governor Chris Christie	Kenny Chesney
Where The Roots' first dates were; Tonight Show Obama Expressions; Russell Crowe brings Jimmy, The Roots, Jimmy's family, and the audience hats; Russell Crowe and Jimmy performed "Balls in Your Mouth"; Chris Christie tries The Tonight Show Starring Jimmy Fallon ice cream; Kenny Chesney performed "Wild Child"
248	April 23, 2015	Chris Evans, Monty Python	LunchMoney Lewis
Hillary Clinton Vs. Bill de Blasio; Tonight Show #hashtags: #MyWeirdWaiter; Tonight Show Shaggy Off (appearance by Shaggy); Team Flip Cup (Chris Evans, Scott Evans, Gloria Fallon); Monty Python brings Jimmy a coconut; Monty Python invites audience to film screening; LunchMoney Lewis performed "Bills"
249	April 24, 2015	Chris Pratt, Elizabeth Olsen	N/A
Hillary Rodham Clinton Reviews; Thank You Notes; Tonight Show Nonsense Karaoke (Chris Pratt); GE Tonight Show Fallonventions: Kid's Inventions
250	April 27, 2015	Robert Downey Jr., Fran Lebowitz	Zac Brown Band
Obama Sitcom Titles; Jimmy and The Roots act out as a soap opera; Jimmy acknowledges tragedy in Nepal; Freestylin' with The Roots; Tonight Show Emotional Interview (Robert Downey Jr.); Fran Lebowitz autographs book for Jimmy's daughter; Zac Brown Band performed "Tomorrow Never Comes"
251	April 28, 2015	Jeremy Renner, Edie Falco	Tori Kelly
Ambercrombie and Fitch Employee; Jimmy acknowledges tragedy in Nepal; Tonight Show Pros & Cons: Buying the Apple Watch; Hawkeye performed song to tune of "Thinking Out Loud"; Edie Falco throws pitch to Jeremy Renner; Tori Kelly performed "Nobody Love"
252	April 29, 2015	Kristen Wiig, Thomas Middleditch	Josh Groban
Hillary Rodham Clinton Slogan; Font Messages; Jimmy acknowledges tragedy in Nepal; Jimmy counts down top/bottom songs in the country; Tonight Show Audience Suggestion Box (Tonight Show Puppy Predictors: 2015 Kentucky Derby Edition); Kristen Wiig appeared as Khaleesi (Rapid Fire Round, Khaleesi performed "Wonderful, Wonderful, Wonderful"); Josh Groban performed "Anthem"
253	April 30, 2015	Scarlett Johansson, David Steinberg	Blur
Bernie Sanders Quotes; Ted Cruz Campaign Ad; David Schwimmer Phone Call; Julia Louis-Dreyfus takes Steve Higgins' place for monologue joke; Jimmy acknowledges tragedy in Nepal; Tonight Show #hashtags: #MyDumbFight; Box of Lies (Scarlett Johansson); Blur performed "Ong Ong"

=== May ===
No.	Original release date	Guest(s)	Musical/entertainment guest(s)
254	May 1, 2015	Helen Hunt, Jesse Eisenberg	My Morning Jacket
ESPN Packages; Adventure: Cage of Boron; Jimmy acknowledges tragedy in Nepal; Thank You Notes; Beer Pong (Helen Hunt); My Morning Jacket performed "Compound Fracture"
255	May 4, 2015	Jack Black, Melissa Rivers	Jeff Garlin
Nigel Duffy; Tonight Show Screengrabs; Jimmy and Jack Black recreate "More Than Words" music video; Jimmy shows excerpts from Joan Rivers' report cards; Melissa Rivers brings Jimmy Joan Rivers' Tony Danza joke
256	May 5, 2015	Sofía Vergara, James Marsden	Fetty Wap
NBC uses Netflix format; Jimmy promotes Josh Lieb's new book; Tonight Show Pros & Cons: "Mother's Day"; Catchphrase (Jimmy Fallon & Sofía Vergara Vs. Steve Higgins & James Marsden); James Marsden's first Instagram photo; Fetty Wap performed "Trap Queen"
257	May 6, 2015	Kerry Washington, Jesse Tyler Ferguson	Noel Gallagher's High Flying Birds
YouTube Film Announcement; Tonight Show The Big Question; Tonight Show Superlatives; Tonight Show Lip Flip (Kerry Washington); Noel Gallagher's High Flying Birds performed "Lock All the Doors"
258	May 7, 2015	Jane Fonda, Sean "Diddy" Combs	The Vaccines
Football #6 Interview; Tonight Show Just the Facts; Jeff Bradshaw sits in with The Roots; Steve Higgins and Jimmy try Sean "Diddy" Combs' fragrance; Tonight Show #hashtags: #MomQuotes; Tonight Show True Facts of Truth (Jane Fonda); Sean "Diddy" Combs and Jimmy have cocktails; The Vaccines performed "Dream Lover"
259	May 8, 2015	U2	U2
Tonight Show Meme the News; Tariq's favorite guacamole; Thank You Notes; Bono gets on a bicycle for the first time since his injury; U2 busks in subway in disguise; U2 performed "Beautiful Day/Song for Someone"
260	May 11, 2015	Charlize Theron, Tom Brokaw	Death Cab for Cutie
Barack Obama Phone Calls; The Roots tell Chris Christie jokes; Tonight Show Kid Letters (Steve Higgins and Jimmy try Vegemite, Jimmy dances with audience member); Charlize Theron tries Vegemite; Charlize Theron and Jimmy slip into something more comfortable; Charlize Theron does a bass riff; Death Cab for Cutie performed "The Ghosts of Beverly Drive"
261	May 12, 2015	Anna Kendrick, Terry Crews	Nate Ruess
Deflategate Beat; Olive Garden Ad; Unlocking the Truth sits in with The Roots; Tonight Show Pros & Cons: Having a "Dad Bod"; Jimmy promotes Snapple; Egg Russian Roulette (Anna Kendrick); Jimmy gives Terry Crews a USB drive with his Lip Sync Battle performance; Nate Ruess performed "Nothing Without Love"
262	May 13, 2015	Rebel Wilson, Rosie Huntington-Whiteley	Faith No More
Time to Rhyme; Places where Willie Nelson got stoned; Tonight Show Dictionary; Jimmy tries koala chocolate; Tonight Show Whisper Challenge (Rebel Wilson); Faith No More performed "Superhero"
263	May 14, 2015	Bill O'Reilly, Snoop Dogg	Snoop Dogg
First Family Matters; Police Statement; Bear Statement; Tonight Show #hashtags: #IGotBusted; Jacob's Patience (Snoop Dogg); Snoop Dogg performed "So Many Pros"
264	May 15, 2015	Queen Latifah, Sam Rockwell	The cast of Something Rotten!
Where in the World Is Hillary Clinton?; Secret Service Agent Quote; Hashtag the Panda delivers pizza; Jeopardy! Categories; Facebook Headlines; Thank You Notes; Queen Latifah and Jimmy performed "Bust a Move"; Gene Gene the Dancing Machine (Sam Rockwell); the cast of Something Rotten! performed a medley of songs
265	May 18, 2015	Hugh Jackman, Nick Offerman	Janelle Monáe
Republican Music Video; Reviews for Legoland Hotel Resort; Jimmy acknowledges David Letterman; Hugh Jackman shows Jimmy how to eat Vegemite; debut of first Pan; Password (Hugh Jackman & Nick Offerman Vs. Jimmy Fallon & Susan Sarandon); Janelle Monáe performed "Yoga"
266	May 19, 2015	Jamie Foxx, Carla Gugino	Jamie Foxx featuring Kid Ink
Service men and women sit in the audience; 24 Hours At Disney; Tonight Show Pros & Cons: Graduating College; Jimmy rides a phunky duck; Tonight Show Wheel of Musical Impressions (Jamie Foxx); Jamie Foxx performed "I'm Supposed to Be in Love By Now"; Carla Gugino and Jimmy do a military-style push-up; Jamie Foxx featuring Kid Ink performed "Baby's in Love"
267	May 20, 2015	David Duchovny, Jeff Foxworthy	Pitbull
Bernie Sanders Questions; Norwegian Dawn Spokesperson Quote; Solitaire Ad; Kevin Eubanks sits in with The Roots; Tonight Show Popular Mathematics; Tonight Show Are You Smarter than a 5th Grader? (Jimmy Fallon Vs. Pitbull); Pitbull performed "Fun/Time of Our Lives"
268	May 21, 2015	Dwayne Johnson, Meghan Trainor	Meghan Trainor featuring John Legend
Shoppers' Opinion Quotes; Tonight Show #hashtags: #MisheardLyrics; Bobby Restick & Logan Duffy's 1989 commencement speech (Jimmy Fallon, Dwayne Johnson); Meghan Trainor played "All About That Bass" on a Stradivarius; Meghan Trainor featuring John Legend performed "Like I'm Gonna Lose You"
269	May 22, 2015	Sting, Kevin Connolly, Kevin Delaney	N/A
News Drop; Ben & Jerry's Politician Flavors; Jimmy promotes his new book; Thank You Notes; The Ragtime Gals performed "Roxanne" by Sting (with Sting); Sting and Jimmy have Sting's wine; Sting played a song from The Last Ship on guitar

=== June ===
No.	Original release date	Guest(s)	Musical/entertainment guest(s)
270	June 1, 2015	Melissa McCarthy, Ed Sheeran	Ed Sheeran
Ted Cruz Video Game; Terence Blanchard sits in with The Roots; Tonight Show Do Not Read; Steve Joshua promotes Ed Sheeran album (Ed Sheeran performed heavy metal songs); Tonight Show Random Picture Word Association (Melissa McCarthy); Ed Sheeran performed "Photograph"
271	June 2, 2015	Jude Law, Bryce Dallas Howard	Florence and the Machine
Melvin Carraway Statement; Fifty Shades of Grey from male perspective; Jimmy promotes his new book; Tonight Show Pros & Cons: Donald Trump Running for President; Jude Law and Jimmy have beer; Pool Bowling (Jude Law); Florence and the Machine performed "Ship to Wreck"
272	June 3, 2015	Jason Statham, Adrian Grenier	Elayne Boosler
Changed Titles; Time Warner Representative Alan Brint; Tonight Show Superlatives; Slapjack (Jason Statham)
273	June 4, 2015	John Cusack, Chita Rivera	Ricky Martin
Rick Perry Quotes; Jimmy promotes his new book; Tonight Show #hashtags: #WeddingFail; Tonight Show Wonder Window; Jimmy says "Happy Graduation" to John Cusack's nephew, signs a card, and gives him a present; Chita Rivera teaches Jimmy dance moves; Ricky Martin performed "Mr. Put It Down"
274	June 5, 2015	Amanda Seyfried, Marlon Wayans	Jason Derulo
Thank You Notes; Catchphrase (Jimmy Fallon & Amanda Seyfried Vs. Marlon Wayans & Jason Derulo); Jason Derulo performed "Want to Want Me"
275	June 8, 2015	Larry David & Jason Alexander, Natasha Leggero, Victor Espinoza	Alabama Shakes
NBA Personnel Quotes; Tennis grunts set to music; Music Search Results; Apple Expert; Jimmy promotes his new book; Tonight Show Screengrabs; Quadruple Crown (Victor Espinoza); Alabama Shakes performed "Over My Head"
276	June 9, 2015	Denis Leary, Molly Shannon	Kacey Musgraves
Kamal Gray advertises airplane faux pas; Keys To Happiness; Jimmy promotes his new book; Tonight Show Pros & Cons: Female Viagra; Jimmy promotes Dairy Queen Jurassic Smash Blizzard; Tonight Show Nonsense Karaoke (Molly Shannon, Denis Leary); Kacey Musgraves performed "Biscuits"
277	June 10, 2015	Whoopi Goldberg, Christian Slater	Of Monsters and Men
Tonight Show Up for Debate; Jimmy promotes his new book; Tonight Show Celebrity Whispers...; Tonight Show Audience Suggestion Box (Hashtag the Panda plays the drums, The Page Persons performed the "Remember Your Stuff Before You Leave the House" song, Black Simon & Garfunkel); Whoopi Goldberg brings Jimmy cheesecake; Jimmy signs his book for Whoopi Goldberg's great granddaughter; Of Monsters and Men performed "Crystals"
278	June 11, 2015	David Spade, Jennette McCurdy	A$AP Rocky
Tonight Show Superlatives; Tonight Show #hashtags: #DinoRaps; Tonight Show Q.A.Q.; A$AP Rocky performed "LSD/Jukebox Joints"
279	June 12, 2015	Lena Dunham, Colin Quinn	Colin Quinn
The Roots correct Jimmy's monologue joke; Thank You Notes; Lip Sync Battle (Lena Dunham); Colin Quinn did a stand-up comedy bit
280	June 15, 2015	Aziz Ansari, Taylor Schilling	Adam Lambert
Republican Candidate Letters; Larry Campbell sits in with The Roots; Freestylin' with The Roots; Tonight Show First Textual Experience (Aziz Ansari); Adam Lambert performed "Ghost Town"
281	June 16, 2015	Billy Crystal, Jeb Bush	Courtney Barnett
Jurassic World Sequel Titles; Slow Jam the News (Jeb Bush); Tonight Show Pros & Cons: The New Fifty Shades of Grey Book; Jeb Bush and Jimmy have a drink; Courtney Barnett performed "Pedestrian at Best"
282	June 17, 2015	Mark Ruffalo, Alan Rickman	James Taylor
Jimmy explains monologue joke in Spanish; Tonight Show Picture This; Two James Taylors on a Seesaw (with James Taylor); Alan Rickman and Jimmy suck on helium balloons; James Taylor performed "Stretch of the Highway"
283	June 18, 2015	Colin Farrell, Jason Schwartzman, Elmo	N/A
Elmo announces the opening; Tonight Show #hashtags: #DadQuotes; Tonight Show True Confessions (Colin Farrell, Vince Vaughn); Jason Schwartzman and Jimmy get a couples massage
284	June 19, 2015	Vince Vaughn, Jim Gaffigan	Ryn Weaver
Regis Philbin announces the opening; Do You Smoke Marijuana?; Tonight Show Pop Quiz: Father's Day Edition; Jimmy promotes his new book and gives audience the book; Thank You Notes (Regis Philbin does Thank You Notes); Tonight Show 5–Second Summaries (Vince Vaughn); Ryn Weaver performed "Promises"
285	June 22, 2015	Seth MacFarlane, Amber Heard	Leon Bridges
Mets Bucket Hat Guy; Tonight Show Wheel of Impressions (Seth MacFarlane); Leon Bridges performed "Coming Home"
286	June 23, 2015	Channing Tatum, Mo Rocca	X Ambassadors
Questlove and Tariq re-enact a scene from The Bachelorette (appearance by Kaitlyn Bristowe); Tonight Show Pros & Cons: Going to Marijuana Camp; Tonight Show Kid Theater (Channing Tatum); X Ambassadors performed "Renegades"
287	June 24, 2015	Arnold Schwarzenegger, Mike Birbiglia	Major Lazer featuring MØ
Jimmy counts down top/bottom songs in the country; Jimmy calls winner of contest; Brainstorm (Arnold Schwarzenegger); Major Lazer featuring MØ performed "Lean On"
288	June 25, 2015	Mark Wahlberg, Chris Colfer	Morrissey
Bobby Jindal Poll Numbers; Jimmy and The Roots tell monologue joke; Hoverboard Tryout Quotes; Cat videos edited with Mitch McConnell hearing; Tonight Show #hashtags: #EmailFail; Tonight Show Head Shots (Mark Wahlberg); Morrissey performed "Kiss Me a Lot"

=== July ===
No.	Original release date	Guest(s)	Musical/entertainment guest(s)
289	July 13, 2015	Paul Rudd, Jon Glaser	Echosmith
Teachers Union Announcement; Jimmy addresses his hand injury; Drinko (Paul Rudd); Echosmith performed "Let's Love"
290	July 14, 2015	LeBron James, Tina Fey & Amy Poehler	OMI
Mark Rivera sits in with The Roots; Tonight Show Pros & Cons: Going to a Donald Trump Campaign Rally; LeBron James brings Jimmy shoes; Faceketballs (LeBron James); Tonight Show True Confessions (Tina Fey & Amy Poehler); debut of first trailer for Sisters; OMI performed "Cheerleader"
291	July 15, 2015	Amy Schumer, Ian McKellen	Alan Jackson
Audience at home is high; Podcast Interview; Tonight Show Do Not Play; Tonight Show Emotional Interview (Amy Schumer); Alan Jackson performed "Angels and Alcohol"
292	July 16, 2015	Bill Hader, Cara Delevingne	Years & Years
Tonight Show #hashtags: #MyDumbInjury (appearance by Judd Apatow); Point Pleasant Police Department (Bill Hader); Cara Delevingne beat-boxes; Years & Years performed "King"
293	July 17, 2015	Ryan Seacrest, Trevor Noah	Tig Notaro
Thank You Notes
294	July 20, 2015	Adam Sandler, Judd Apatow	N/A
Giorgio Moroder sits in with The Roots; Tonight Show Screengrabs; Tonight Show Lip Flip (Adam Sandler); Judd Apatow did a stand-up comedy bit
295	July 21, 2015	Jake Gyllenhaal, Josh Gad	James Bay
Tonight Show Pros & Cons: Going to Disneyland in China; Jimmy gives Jake Gyllenhaal a fork; Slapjack (Jake Gyllenhaal); Josh Gad brings Jimmy a tooth; James Bay performed "Let It Go"
296	July 22, 2015	Norm Macdonald, JoAnna Garcia Swisher	Jeremih featuring Flo Rida
Politicians Try to Speak Spanish; Celebrity Tweets; Tonight Show Audience Suggestion Box (Chevy Chase and Jimmy play piano); Steve Higgins plays Charades; Norm Macdonald does impression of Johnny Carson; Jeremih featuring Flo Rida performed "Tonight Belongs to U!"
297	July 23, 2015	Katie Holmes, David Wain & Michael Showalter	Sage the Gemini featuring Nick Jonas
Donald Trump Book Titles; Emoji Film Test Scenes; Tonight Show #hashtags: #ThereISaidIt; Katie Holmes and Jimmy have spaghetti and meatballs; Say Anything (Katie Holmes); Lip Sing Battle (David Wain & Michael Showalter); Sage the Gemini featuring Nick Jonas performed "Good Thing"
298	July 24, 2015	Rachel McAdams, Michael Peña	Robert Klein
Other Things Trump Does For Fun; Tonight Show Top Searches; Thank You Notes; The Tonight Show Starring Jimmy Fallon ice cream song
299	July 27, 2015	Tom Cruise, Dick Cavett	Ashley Monroe
One Direction Hotness Poll; Buddy Guy sits in with The Roots; Tonight Show In Reply To; Lip Sync Battle (Tom Cruise); Ashley Monroe performed "Winning Streak"
300	July 28, 2015	Danny DeVito, Simon Pegg	George Ezra
Donald Trump Book Chapters; Drunk Ron Weasley (Simon Pegg); Donn T. sits in with The Roots; Tonight Show Pros & Cons: Going on a Family Vacation; Inflatable Flip Cup (Danny DeVito); George Ezra performed "Budapest"
301	July 29, 2015	Jason Segel, Amy Sedaris	Alessia Cara
Clippy; Tonight Show Obama Expressions; Tonight Show Word Sneak (Jason Segel); Amy Sedaris takes Jimmy through a day with her; Alessia Cara performed "Here"
302	July 30, 2015	Ice-T, Bella Thorne	Lauryn Hill
Hashtag the Panda brings out jokes; LaGuardia Improvements; Tonight Show #hashtags: #AirportFail; Ice-T voice-overs; Lauryn Hill performed "Feeling Good"
303	July 31, 2015	Kevin Bacon, Mel B	Russell Howard
Hank Phillips; Jimmy announces Mix Tape Month; Thank You Notes; First Drafts of Rock (Kevin Bacon)

=== August ===
No.	Original release date	Guest(s)	Musical/entertainment guest(s)
304	August 3, 2015	Meryl Streep, Jerrod Carmichael	Albert Hammond Jr.
Lincoln Chafee Campaign Ad; Barack Obama calls Donald Trump; Albert Hammond Jr. performed "Losing Touch"
305	August 4, 2015	Don Rickles, Kate Mara	Penn & Teller
Joe Satriani sits in with The Roots; Tonight Show Pros & Cons: Watching the Republican Debates
306	August 5, 2015	Ice Cube, Mamie Gummer	Nathaniel Rateliff & The Night Sweats
Kraft Official Statement; Tonight Show Dictionary; Things N.W.A Does Not Stand For; Nathaniel Rateliff & The Night Sweats performed "S.O.B."
307	August 6, 2015	Salma Hayek, Tim Gunn	Christopher Cross
Jimmy congratulates The Daily Show; Tonight Show #hashtags: #WorstSummerJob; Tonight Show Pup Quiz (Salma Hayek); Christopher Cross performed "Sailing"
308	August 7, 2015	Steve Buscemi, Taylor Kitsch	Jon Rineman
Barack Obama Audio; Shaquille O'Neal Podcast; Thank You Notes; Beer Hockey (Taylor Kitsch)
309	August 10, 2015	Christopher Meloni, Luke Bryan	Luke Bryan
Boney James sits in with The Roots; Donald Trump Press Conference; Catchphrase (Jimmy Fallon & Luke Bryan Vs. Christopher Meloni & Steve Higgins); Luke Bryan performed "Strip It Down"
310	August 11, 2015	Kristen Stewart, Jim Belushi	Yolanda Adams
Phil Walzak; Tonight Show Pros & Cons: Going to a Nude Beach; Jimmy promotes Sprint; Tonight Show Word Blurt (Kristen Stewart); Yolanda Adams performed "Victory"
311	August 12, 2015	Ben Kingsley, Henry Cavill	Reba McEntire
Bernie Sanders Campaign Slogans; Leonardo DiCaprio Quote; David Schwimmer Phone Call; Jimmy counts down top/bottom songs in the country; Tonight Show Audience Suggestion Box (Tariq raps about the Republican candidates, Reba McEntire and Jimmy serenade audience member); Sir Ben Kingsley takes audience member's cell phone; Reba McEntire performed "Until They Don't Love You"
312	August 13, 2015	Paul Giamatti, Alicia Vikander	Robin Thicke
Crew Sketches; Steve Higgins' birthday; Freestylin' with The Roots; Alicia Vikander teaches Jimmy a dance; Jimmy gives Alicia Vikander IKEA party package; Robin Thicke performed "Back Together"
313	August 14, 2015	Kevin Spacey, Keegan-Michael Key	Monroe Martin
Scott Walker Can't Say "Volume"; Thank You Notes; Kevin Spacey plays harmonica; Phone Booth (Kevin Spacey)
314	August 17, 2015	Zac Efron, Fran Lebowitz	The cast of Amazing Grace
Pony Statements; Tonight Show Screengrabs; Egg Russian Roulette (Zac Efron); the cast of Amazing Grace performed "Amazing Grace"
315	August 18, 2015	Taraji P. Henson, Edward Burns	Sam Hunt
Sharon Jones sits in with The Roots; Tonight Show Pros & Cons: Sesame Street Moving to HBO; Jimmy promotes Ford Focus ST (appearance by Brad Keselowski); Tonight Show Fast Family Feud (Taraji P. Henson); Sam Hunt performed "House Party"
316	August 19, 2015	Heidi Klum, David Oyelowo	Carly Rae Jepsen
TJ Evans; Frozen Fan Reactions; Bernard Fowler sits in with The Roots; Tonight Show Popular Mathematics; Box of Lies (Heidi Klum); Carly Rae Jepsen performed "Run Away with Me"
317	August 20, 2015	Rachel Maddow, Artie Lange	The Doobie Brothers with Michael McDonald
Tonight Show What's the Beef?; Tonight Show #hashtags: #WorstRoadTripEver; Rachel Maddow makes a cocktail; The Doobie Brothers with Michael McDonald performed a medley of songs
318	August 21, 2015	Jason Schwartzman, Tatiana Maslany	Dan White
Facebook Headlines; Thank You Notes; Tux; Jason Schwartzman gives Jimmy Tux album
319	August 31, 2015	Governor Chris Christie, Victoria Justice	Gary Clark Jr.
Kanye West Presidential Slogans; Trump Newspaper Headlines; Tariq became a father; Tonight Show Do Not Read; Urban Dictionary (Victoria Justice); Gary Clark Jr. performed "The Healing"

=== September ===
No.	Original release date	Guest(s)	Musical/entertainment guest(s)
320	September 1, 2015	Liev Schreiber, Elle Fanning, Anthony Sadler	Vince Staples
Wedding Guest Book Writings; Tonight Show Pros & Cons: Going to Burning Man; Vince Staples performed "Let Me Know"
321	September 2, 2015	Justin Bieber, Salman Rushdie	Justin Bieber
Hillary Rodham Clinton E-mail Subject Lines; Apple Inc. Original Programming; Freestylin' with The Roots (appearance by Justin Bieber); Justin Bieber reveals album release date; Justin Bieber performed country version of "Where Are You Now?"; Justin Bieber and Questlove have a drum-off; Justin Bieber performed "What Do You Mean?"
322	September 3, 2015	Jason Sudeikis, Bel Powley	Brad Paisley
Tom Brady & Tom Brady Courtroom Sketch Quotes; Joe Bonamassa sits in with The Roots; Tonight Show #hashtags: #MyRoommateIsWeird; Drinko (Jason Sudeikis); Brad Paisley performed "Country Nation"
323	September 4, 2015	Steve Harvey, Alison Brie	Florida Georgia Line
Tariq shows the audience how to make meat sticks; Thank You Notes; Tonight Show Family Feud (Fallons Vs. The Roots); Florida Georgia Line performed "Anything Goes"
324	September 8, 2015	Richard Gere, Jessica Simpson	Keith Urban
Presidential Candidates' Body Language; Jimmy congratulates The Late Show with Stephen Colbert; Tonight Show Pros & Cons: The New Season of NFL Football; Tonight Show Kid Letters; Keith Urban performed "John Cougar, John Deere, John 3:16"
325	September 9, 2015	Justin Timberlake, Ellen DeGeneres	Macklemore & Ryan Lewis
Justin Timberlake and Jimmy performed a medley of songs to open the show (History of Hip-Hop 6); Queen Elizabeth II Quote; Justin Timberlake and Jimmy give each other mugs; Justin Timberlake and a friend show Jimmy how to make a cocktail; Lip Sync Battle (Ellen DeGeneres); Macklemore & Ryan Lewis performed "Downtown"
326	September 10, 2015	Andy Samberg, Carrie Underwood	Carrie Underwood
Presidential Candidates' First Grade Teacher Comments; Tonight Show Superlatives; Andy Samberg and Jimmy demonstrate planking; Face Kickers (Andy Samberg, Carrie Underwood); Carrie Underwood performed "Smoke Break"
327	September 11, 2015	Donald Trump, Terrence Howard	Pharrell Williams
Tonight Show Fashion Week: Dad Edition; Thank You Notes; Donald Trump (Jimmy Fallon) interviews Donald Trump in dressing room mirror; Jimmy gives Terrence Howard a championship belt; Pharrell Williams performed "Freedom"
328	September 14, 2015	Benicio del Toro, Jessica Alba	Miguel
Justin Timberlake and Jimmy have a telepathic conversation (appearance by Will Ferrell); Tonight Show Long Story Short (Benicio del Toro & Miguel Vs. Jimmy Fallon & Jessica Alba); Jessica Alba brings Jimmy beauty products for his wife; Miguel performed "Simple Things"
329	September 15, 2015	Robert De Niro, Ariana Grande	Duran Duran
The Weather Channel Commercial; The Debating Game; Robert De Niro and Jimmy do impressions; Ariana Grande brings Jimmy a large bottle of her perfume; Ariana Grande announces her new singles release date; Tonight Show Wheel of Musical Impressions (Ariana Grande); Duran Duran performed "Pressure Off"
330	September 16, 2015	Hillary Clinton, Dakota Johnson	Fetty Wap
Facebook Buttons; Tonight Show Superlatives; Donald Trump's phone call with Hillary Clinton; Dakota Johnson does different accents; Fetty Wap performed "679"
331	September 17, 2015	Kaley Cuoco-Sweeting, Wesley Snipes	Chris Cornell
Bush Family Tweets; Tonight Show The Gist; Tonight Show #hashtags: #OneTimeInClass; Kaley Cuoco-Sweeting takes Polaroid pictures; Tonight Show Pup Quiz (Kaley Cuoco-Sweeting); Chris Cornell performed "Nearly Forgot My Broken Heart"
332	September 18, 2015	Keith Richards, Emma Roberts	Nate Bargatze
Facebook Presidential Candidate Birthday Wishes; The Roots are not Sex and the City fans; Jimmy's birthday is tomorrow; Thank You Notes; Jimmy daydreams of Lionel Richie (appearance by Lionel Richie); Keith Richards brings Jimmy a birthday card; Emma Roberts teaches Jimmy the ##### face; Emma Roberts and Jimmy do a fake scream
333	September 21, 2015	Ryan Reynolds, Carly Fiorina	Shawn Mendes
Tonight Show Tale of the Tape: Pope Vs. Putin; Jimmy announces Joke with the Pope program; Freestylin' with The Roots; Jimmy gives Ryan Reynolds his book; Slapjack (Ryan Reynolds); Carly Fiorina performed song about her dogs; Shawn Mendes performed "Stitches"
334	September 22, 2015	Anne Hathaway, Anthony Anderson	A Great Big World
Rules For Meeting The Pope; People in favor of Bernie Sanders; Tonight Show Digital Original: Jimpire (appearance by Terrence Howard, Taraji P. Henson, Donald Trump); Anthony Anderson performed "The Greatest Love of All"; A Great Big World performed "Hold Each Other"
335	September 23, 2015	James Spader, Andrew Rannells	Brian Regan
Tonight Show Superlatives; Jimmy remembers his first job at a fast food restaurant (appearance by cast of Good Burger); Jimmy gives James Spader album for his collection
336	September 24, 2015	Joseph Gordon-Levitt, Chris Hardwick	Big Grams
Putting The Roots on the Spot with a Question; Micky Dolenz sits in with The Roots; Tonight Show #hashtags: #FallSongs; The Ragtime Gals performed "##### Better Have My Money" by Rihanna (with Joseph Gordon-Levitt); Big Grams performed "Fell in the Sun"
337	September 25, 2015	Olivia Wilde, Fred Savage	Walk the Moon
Jimmy announces Tonight Show stamp app; Thank You Notes; Watermelon Time Bomb (Olivia Wilde); Walk the Moon performed "Different Colors"
338	September 28, 2015	Rob Lowe, Kat Dennings & Beth Behrs	Hozier
Tonight Show Screengrabs; Jimmy shows Rob Lowe's skin care products; Password (Kat Dennings & Beth Behrs Vs. Jimmy Fallon & Rob Lowe); Kat Dennings & Beth Behrs do a cheer; Hozier performed "Jackie and Wilson"
339	September 29, 2015	Julianne Moore, Mark-Paul Gosselaar	DNCE
Pope Francis' New Album; Tonight Show Pros & Cons: UN Week in New York; Box of Lies (Julianne Moore); DNCE performed "Cake by the Ocean"
340	September 30, 2015	Julianna Margulies, Andy Cohen, Ask This Old House	N/A
Rand Paul Campaign Ad; Democratic Candidate RSVPs; John Scofield sits in with The Roots; Tonight Show Audience Suggestion Box (The Wolf Waker wakes audience members' wolves, Shaq's podcast, Black Simon & Garfunkel (appearance by Art Garfunkel)

=== October ===
No.	Original release date	Guest(s)	Musical/entertainment guest(s)
341	October 1, 2015	Miley Cyrus, Sam Rockwell, Chef Danny Bowien	N/A
Tonight Show Superlatives; Tonight Show #hashtags: #MyFirstApartment; Tonight Show Emotional Interview (Miley Cyrus); Gene Gene the Dancing Machine (Sam Rockwell)
342	October 2, 2015	Seth Rogen, Victor Cruz	Chvrches
Happy/Sad Slogans; Thank You Notes; Tonight Show True Confessions (Seth Rogen, Steve Wozniak); Victor Cruz brings Jimmy sneakers; Chvrches performed "Leave a Trace"
343	October 5, 2015	Hugh Jackman, Shaquille O'Neal	Talib Kweli
Warren Haynes sits in with The Roots; Tonight Show Popular Mathematics; Phone Booth (Hugh Jackman, Shaquille O'Neal); Shaqsticles; Talib Kweli performed "Every Ghetto"
344	October 6, 2015	Lady Gaga, Ronda Rousey	Hailee Steinfeld
Tonight Show Street Search; Jay Leno subs in for Jimmy's monologue; Tonight Show Pros & Cons: Living on Mars; Jimmy gives Ronda Rousey chicken wings; Hailee Steinfeld performed "Love Myself"
345	October 7, 2015	Kate Winslet, Norman Reedus	N/A
Mark Kelley starts a pledge drive; Tonight Show Superlatives; Tonight Show Photo Booth (Kate Winslet); GE Tonight Show Fallonventions: Kid's Inventions
346	October 8, 2015	Michael Fassbender, Brie Larson	CeeLo Green
Airplane Seating Designs; Harvard Debate Quotes; Tonight Show #hashtags: #WorstCollegeParty; Tonight Show Whisper Challenge (Brie Larson); CeeLo Green performed "Music to My Soul"
347	October 9, 2015	Jeff Daniels, Whoopi Goldberg	Nelly
C-SPAN Quotes; Presidential Candidate Quotes; Tonight Show Pop Quiz: Comic Con Edition; Thank You Notes; Pictionary (Jeff Daniels & Nelly Vs. Whoopi Goldberg & Jimmy Fallon); Whoopi Goldberg brings Jimmy cookie dough; Nelly performed "The Fix"
348	October 12, 2015	Clive Owen, Gabrielle Union	Neon Indian
Bill Clinton Titles; Jazmine Sullivan sits in with The Roots; Tonight Show Do Not Play; Morning Announcements (Gabrielle Union); Neon Indian performed "Annie"
349	October 13, 2015	Michael Strahan, Eve Hewson	Charles Kelley featuring Dierks Bentley & Eric Paslay
Debate Prop Bets; Tonight Show Pros & Cons: Watching the First Democratic Debate; Four-way Air Hockey (Michael Strahan & Tony Gonzales Vs. Jimmy Fallon & Eve Hewson); Charles Kelley, Dierks Bentley, & Eric Paslay performed "The Driver"
350	October 14, 2015	Vin Diesel, Selena Gomez	Selena Gomez
Jimmy announces his invention Hands High; Donald Trump's phone call with Ben Carson (appearance by David Alan Grier); Selena Gomez uses her ghost app; Tonight Show Dubsmash (Selena Gomez); Selena Gomez performed "Same Old Love"
351	October 15, 2015	Tom Hanks, Jessica Chastain	Pentatonix
Pentatonix performed the opening theme; Tonight Show Superlatives; Tonight Show #hashtags: #WhyDidISayThat; Tonight Show Kid Theater (Tom Hanks); Pentatonix performed "Can't Sleep Love"
352	October 16, 2015	Bruce Willis, Sienna Miller	BØRNS
Thank You Notes; Bruce Willis comes out dressed as Donald Trump; Egg Russian Roulette (Sienna Miller); BØRNS performed "Electric Love"
353	October 26, 2015	David Spade, Mike Tyson	Blake Shelton
Jimmy discusses his new hand injury; Tonight Show Spin the Microphone (Adam Levine, Gwen Stefani, Pharrell Williams, Blake Shelton); Blake Shelton performed "Gonna"
354	October 27, 2015	Drew Barrymore, Stephen Moyer	5 Seconds of Summer
Steve Turre sits in with The Roots; Jimmy announces Race Through New York Starring Jimmy Fallon; Tonight Show Pros & Cons: Going to the World Series on Halloween Night; Tonight Show Pup Quiz (Drew Barrymore); 5 Seconds of Summer performed "Hey Everybody!"
355	October 28, 2015	Sandra Bullock, Rod Stewart	Rod Stewart
1986 Bret Saberhagen raps; Least Favorite Halloween Candies List; Tonight Show Superlatives; Jacob's Patience (Sandra Bullock); Rod Stewart performed "Please"
356	October 29, 2015	Will Forte, Kate Upton, Alex Rodriguez	Steve Martin & Edie Brickell
Hashtag the Panda brings out a joke; Tonight Show #hashtags: #HalloweenFail; Will Forte gets his beard test results (appearance by Rachel Dratch, Jon Hamm); Alex Rodriguez gives fan game tickets; Steve Martin & Edie Brickell performed "Won't Go Back"
357	October 30, 2015	Dana Carvey, Demi Lovato	Demi Lovato
Charley Kline Audio Recording; Tonight Show Questions & Danswers; Thank You Notes; Tonight Show Wheel of Impressions (Dana Carvey); Demi Lovato brings Jimmy a jacket and pumpkin; Demi Lovato performed "Confident"

=== November ===
No.	Original release date	Guest(s)	Musical/entertainment guest(s)
358	November 2, 2015	Bryan Cranston, Rachel Maddow	Andrea Bocelli
Shaquille O'Neal Podcast; Tonight Show Screengrabs; Suspended Suspense (Bryan Cranston); Andrea Bocelli performed "Moon River"
359	November 3, 2015	Bill O'Reilly, Paul Bettany	Alanis Morissette
Bill O'Reilly gives demands for next Republican debate; In the Heart of the Sea trailer; Tonight Show Pros & Cons: The New, Sensitive James Bond; The Jagged Little Chicks performed "Ironic" by Alanis Morissette (with Alanis Morissette, Meghan Trainor); Alanis Morissette performed "Hand in My Pocket"
360	November 4, 2015	Aziz Ansari, Christie Brinkley, Eric Hosmer & Salvador Pérez	Wayne Federman
Bobby Jindal Interview (Aziz Ansari); Tonight Show Superlatives; 1986 Bret Saberhagen raps (appearance by Bret Saberhagen)
361	November 5, 2015	Martin Short, Saoirse Ronan	Harry Connick Jr.
Stanley Jordan sits in with The Roots; Tonight Show #hashtags: #IllegalizeIt; Steve Martin crashes Martin Short's interview; Tensions (Martin Short, Steve Martin); Harry Connick Jr. performed "(I Do) Like We Do"
362	November 6, 2015	Christoph Waltz, Lin-Manuel Miranda	Meghan Trainor
Bernie Sanders Rap Campaign Ad; Thank You Notes; Christoph Waltz and Jimmy wear mustaches; Tonight Show Wheel of Freestyle (Lin-Manuel Miranda); Meghan Trainor performed "Better When I'm Dancin'"
363	November 9, 2015	Michael Keaton, Nick Offerman	Chris Janson
Nick Offerman shares his favorite things from Oprah Winfrey's list; Freestylin' with The Roots; Chris Janson performed "Buy Me a Boat"
364	November 10, 2015	Daniel Radcliffe, Chris Packham	Ellie Goulding
Donald Trump Quote; Jimmy does "Gangnam Style" dance (appearance by Daniel Radcliffe); Christian McBride sits in with The Roots; Tonight Show Pros & Cons: The Fourth Republican Debate; Water War (Daniel Radcliffe); Ellie Goulding performed "On My Mind"
365	November 11, 2015	James McAvoy, Sam Smith	Kurt Braunohler
Billy Crystal subs in for Jimmy's monologue joke; Jimmy thanks service men and women; Tonight Show Audience Suggestion Box (appearance by Henrik Lundqvist, Two Really Fun Men performed "Thanksgiving's Coming Up", appearance by The Undertaker); James McAvoy gives Jimmy a ride on his shoulders; Different hairstyles on James McAvoy
366	November 12, 2015	Elizabeth Banks, Jon Glaser	Tim McGraw
Tonight Show Superlatives; Tonight Show #hashtags: #StopItDad; Catchphrase (Jon Glaser & Tim McGraw Vs. Elizabeth Banks & Jimmy Fallon); Tim McGraw performed "Here Tonight"
367	November 13, 2015	Ethan Hawke, Paul Dano	A Tribe Called Quest
Notice about episode filming prior to November 2015 Paris attacks; Seahawk Superlatives; Thank You Notes; Paul Dano and Jimmy performed "Barbara Ann"; A Tribe Called Quest performed "Can I Kick It?"
368	November 16, 2015	Cate Blanchett, Anthony Mackie	Tinashe
John Pizzarelli sits in with The Roots; Jimmy acknowledges the November 2015 Paris attacks; Tonight Show In Reply To; Tonight Show Lip Flip (Cate Blanchett); Jimmy gives Anthony Mackie a sweatshirt; Anthony Mackie performed "Caribbean Queen"; Tinashe performed "Player"
369	November 17, 2015	Rooney Mara, Jesse Tyler Ferguson	Justin Bieber
Jimmy announces his cover story in Esquire; Tonight Show Pros & Cons: Obama Joining Facebook; Tonight Show 500 (Jeff Gordon & Jimmy Fallon, Martin Truex Jr. & Jesse Tyler Ferguson Vs. Kyle Busch & Tariq, Kevin Harvick & Justin Bieber); Justin Bieber performed "Sorry"
370	November 18, 2015	Jennifer Lawrence, Michael B. Jordan	Jeff Lynne's ELO
The Bachelor Trailer; Tonight Show Superlatives; Jimmy announces his iPhone case (appearance by Santa Claus); Come Dance with Us! (Jennifer Lawrence); Jeff Lynne's ELO performed "When I Was a Boy"
371	November 19, 2015	Rachel Weisz, Spike Lee	R. Kelly
Bobby Jindal Interview (Aziz Ansari); David Beckham Statement; Tonight Show #hashtags: #MyFamilyIsWeird; Justin Bieber and Jimmy's secret handshake (appearance by Justin Bieber); Tonight Show Kid Letters; R. Kelly performed a medley of songs
372	November 20, 2015	Gordon Ramsay, Billie Lourd	Randy Syphax
Erykah Badu sits in with The Roots; Thank You Notes; Tonight Show MasterChef Junior Cook-Off; Billie Lourd and Jimmy performed "With Arms Wide Open"
373	November 23, 2015	Kelly Ripa, Adele	Adele
Tonight Show Dictionary; Box of Lies (Adele); Adele performed "Water Under the Bridge"
374	November 24, 2015	Tim Allen, Danai Gurira	Jennifer Nettles
Bernie Sanders Rapper Names; Thanksgiving Dinner Guests List; Tonight Show Pros & Cons: Thanksgiving; Jimmy Fallon, Adele & The Roots sing "Hello" with classroom instruments; Jennifer Nettles performed "Unlove You"
375	November 25, 2015	Nathan Lane, Steven Yeun	Chris Brown
Clintons' Speaking Engagements; Tonight Show Superlatives; Jimmy promotes State Farm Insurance Discount Double Check; Jimmy gives Nathan Lane a blanket; Tonight Show Kid Dictionary (Nathan Lane); Chris Brown performed "Zero"
376	November 26, 2015	Queen Latifah, Rashida Jones, Chef Daniel Humm	Pentatonix
More Accurate Instagram Captions; Kool Keith sits in with The Roots; Bird Flu (appearance by Larry Bird); Thank You Notes; Rashida Jones and Jimmy sing holiday versions of songs (appearance by Queen Latifah, Eric Nally); Pentatonix performed "Joy to the World"
377	November 30, 2015	J. J. Abrams, Pink	The Flaming Lips
Black Friday Poll; Black Friday Deals; The Roots do jokes about the Philadelphia 76ers; Obama Poem; Mindi Abair sits in with The Roots; Tonight Show Do Not Read; The Flaming Lips performed "Bad Days"

=== December ===
No.	Original release date	Guest(s)	Musical/entertainment guest(s)
378	December 1, 2015	Harrison Ford, Seth MacFarlane	JoJo
Marco Rubio Comedy Special Advertisement; Tonight Show Pros & Cons: Holiday Season in NYC; The Yahoo! Answers Lounge Singers (Seth MacFarlane); Harrison Ford and Jimmy have a drink; Jimmy shows Harrison Ford a spit take; JoJo performed "When Love Hurts"
379	December 2, 2015	Adam Driver, Brett Favre	Lenny Clarke
Tonight Show Superlatives; GE Tonight Show Fallonventions: Kid's Inventions; Brett Favre brings Jimmy a jersey; Tonight Show Throwdown (Brett Favre)
380	December 3, 2015	Mindy Kaling, Daisy Ridley	Gwen Stefani
Tonight Show 12 Days of Christmas Sweaters; Tonight Show #hashtags: #WorstGiftEver; Star Wars Flip Cup (Daisy Ridley); Gwen Stefani performed "Used to Love You"
381	December 4, 2015	Sting & Mylène Farmer, Eva Longoria	Sting & Mylène Farmer
Tonight Show 12 Days of Christmas Sweaters; Thank You Notes (appearance by Sting); Eva Longoria and Jimmy do a telenovela moment; Tonight Show Fast Family Feud (Eva Longoria); Sting & Mylène Farmer performed "Stolen Car"
382	December 7, 2015	Claire Danes, Ron Howard	Logic
Republican Quotes; Jimmy explains his current situation with his injury; Jimmy congratulates Questlove and Tariq on their Grammy Award nomination; Tonight Show 12 Days of Christmas Sweaters; Pictionary (Jimmy Fallon & Claire Danes Vs. Steve Higgins & Ron Howard); Logic performed "Fade Away"
383	December 8, 2015	Senator Bernie Sanders, John Cena	Troye Sivan
Tonight Show Pros & Cons: The Elf on the Shelf; Tonight Show 12 Days of Christmas Sweaters; Tonight Show Whisper Challenge (Senator Bernie Sanders); John Cena recalls his childhood (appearance by Troye Sivan); Troye Sivan performed "Youth"
384	December 9, 2015	Amy Poehler, Kevin Nealon	Kevin Nealon
Pet Quotes; Lalah Hathaway sits in with The Roots; Tonight Show 12 Days of Christmas Sweaters; Tonight Show Truth or Truth (Amy Poehler); Kevin Nealon did a stand-up comedy bit
385	December 10, 2015	Chris Hemsworth, Jim Gaffigan	Jamie Lawson
Tonight Show 12 Days of Christmas Sweaters; Tonight Show #hashtags: #UpdatedXmasCarols; Sleigh Scooter Race (Chris Hemsworth); Jamie Lawson performed "Wasn't Expecting That"
386	December 11, 2015	Will Smith, Kirsten Dunst	Calvin Harris
Republican Candidates' Favorite Foods; Donald Trump Medical Results; Tonight Show 12 Days of Christmas Sweaters; Thank You Notes; Catchphrase (Jimmy Fallon & Kirsten Dunst Vs. Will Smith & Tariq); Calvin Harris performed "How Deep Is Your Love"
387	December 14, 2015	Tina Fey, Dane DeHaan	Kenny Rogers
How Republican Presidential Candidates Will Spend Their Time in Vegas; Tonight Show 12 Days of Christmas Sweaters; Tonight Show First Impressions (Tina Fey); Kenny Rogers performed "I'll Be Home for Christmas"
388	December 15, 2015	Mark Wahlberg, Bill Burr	Sheryl Crow
2014 Christmas Vs. 2015 Christmas; Jimmy and The Roots pay tribute to the music of Star Wars medley (appearance by Star Wars: The Force Awakens cast); Tonight Show 12 Days of Christmas Sweaters; Random Object Football Toss (Mark Wahlberg); Sheryl Crow performed "Revolution"; Star Wars opening crawl end credits
389	December 16, 2015	Will Ferrell, Alicia Vikander	Twenty One Pilots
Star Wars: The Floor Is Shakin'; Tonight Show 12 Days of Christmas Sweaters; Will Ferrell comes out dressed as a hipster Santa Claus; Will Ferrell and Jimmy performed a song parody; Will Ferrell brings Jimmy gifts for his daughters; Will Ferrell and Jimmy have a drink; Alicia Vikander has a drink; Jimmy brings out food; Twenty One Pilots performed "Heavydirtysoul"
390	December 17, 2015	Bruce Springsteen, Jeffrey Tambor	Chris Stapleton
Tonight Show 12 Days of Christmas Sweaters; Tonight Show #hashtags: #StarWarsRaps; Chris Stapleton performed "Sometimes I Cry"
391	December 18, 2015	Channing Tatum, John Boyega	Young People's Chorus of New York City
List of Anti-Viral Hits; Star Wars footage edited to "Stayin' Alive"; Tonight Show 12 Days of Christmas Sweaters; Egg Russian Roulette (Channing Tatum); Young People's Chorus of New York City performed "Christmas Time Is Here"
