= List of The Tonight Show Starring Jimmy Fallon episodes (2016) =

- No. of episodes: 207 (and 1 special)

Release
- Original network: NBC
- Original release: January 4 – December 23, 2016

Season chronology
- ← Previous; 2015 episodes Next → 2017 episodes

This is the list of episodes for The Tonight Show Starring Jimmy Fallon in 2016.

== 2016 ==
=== January ===
No.	Original release date	Guest(s)	Musical/entertainment guest(s)
392	January 4, 2016	Sylvester Stallone, John Stamos	Shawn Mendes & Camila Cabello
Presidential Candidate Quotes; Tonight Show Screengrabs; Tonight Show Kid Dictionary (John Stamos); John Stamos and Jimmy do a fishhook; Shawn Mendes & Camila Cabello performed "I Know What You Did Last Summer"
393	January 5, 2016	Kristen Stewart, Michael Shannon	Cage the Elephant
Russian Netflix Series; Tonight Show Pros & Cons: Making a New Year's Resolution; Tonight Show Whisper Challenge (Kristen Stewart); Cage the Elephant performed "Mess Around"
394	January 6, 2016	Billy Joel, J. K. Simmons	Billy Joel
Longer Tweets; Tonight Show Superlatives; Billy Joel and Jimmy performed "Beast of Burden"; Billy Joel performed "Scenes from an Italian Restaurant"
395	January 7, 2016	Mark Ruffalo, Kendrick Lamar	Kendrick Lamar
Michael Bolton Quotes; Mark Kelley's Memory Loss; Jimmy accuses David Bowie of stealing his Thank You Notes gesture for "Lazarus" music video; Tonight Show #hashtags: #WorstFirstDate; Kendrick Lamar performed "Untitled 2"
396	January 8, 2016	Tyler Perry, Wagner Moura	Iliza Shlesinger
Thank You Notes (appearance by Scott Kelly); Tonight Show Spin the Microphone (Tyler Perry, Ilana Glazer, Abbi Jacobson)
397	January 11, 2016	Donald Trump, Ken Jeong	Cam
Jimmy acknowledges death of David Bowie; Tonight Show Picture This; Jimmy gives Donald Trump a mock job interview; Cam performed "Burning House"
398	January 12, 2016	Kevin Hart, Noel Fielding, Joshua Topolsky	N/A
NFL Quarterback Quotes; Dr. Lonnie Smith sits in with The Roots; Tonight Show Pros & Cons: Obama's Final State of the Union Address; debut of Kevin Hart's cross-training shoe; Drinko (Kevin Hart); Noel Fielding brings Jimmy a painted ten-dollar bill
399	January 13, 2016	Danny DeVito, Khloé Kardashian	Colin Hay
State of the Union Address Epilogues; Tonight Show Obama Expressions; Jimmy performed "Hotline Bling" as Bob Dylan; Charades (Danny DeVito & Khloé Kardashian Vs. Jimmy Fallon & Norman Reedus); Colin Hay performed "Overkill"
400	January 14, 2016	Hillary Clinton, Lucy Liu	Flo Rida
Tonight Show Celebrity Photobomb (with Sesame Street characters); Tonight Show #hashtags: #IfIWonPowerball; Hillary Clinton and Jimmy do a Snapchat video; Jimmy gives Hillary Clinton a mock job interview; Flo Rida performed "My House"
401	January 15, 2016	Ray Romano, Lucy Hale	Brandi Carlile
El Chapo Text Messages; Thank You Notes; Tonight Show Explain This Photo (Ray Romano); Ray Romano shows his muscle condition; Brandi Carlile performed "The Things I Regret"
402	January 18, 2016	Tracy Morgan, Julianne Hough	Hank Williams, Jr.
Freestylin' with The Roots; Tonight Show Pup Quiz (Tracy Morgan); Hank Williams, Jr. performed "Are You Ready for the Country"
403	January 19, 2016	Chelsea Handler, Fred Armisen, Mario Batali	N/A
Tonight Show Pros & Cons: Buying the Playboy Mansion; Fred Armisen does Southern accents; Tonight Show Instant Song Analysis (Fred Armisen)
404	January 20, 2016	Dakota Johnson, Marlon Wayans	Stephen Bishop
Donald Trump's Inner Thoughts; Bill Clinton's Odds of Helping Hillary; Tonight Show Audience Suggestion Box (Questlove's birthday, appearance by David Kirsch, NFL players re-enact a scene from Pretty Little Liars) The Acting Game (Dakota Johnson); Jimmy gives Marlon Wayans a Tonight Show Hairstyles sign; Stephen Bishop performed "It Might Be You"
405	January 21, 2016	Sarah Silverman, Marco Rubio	wet
Tonight Show #hashtags: #AwwHellSnow; Tonight Show Word Sneak (Sarah Silverman); wet performed "Weak"
406	January 22, 2016	Jeff Daniels, Lilly Singh	St. Lucia
Presidential Candidates' Marriage Proposal Quotes; Thank You Notes; Jimmy gives Jeff Daniels a hat; Tonight Show Fast Family Feud (Lilly Singh); St. Lucia performed "Dancing on Glass"
407	January 25, 2016	Kate Hudson, Dan Patrick	G-Eazy
Tonight Show Do Not Play; Kate Hudson holds Hashtag the Panda; Tonight Show Dubsmash (Kate Hudson); G-Eazy performed "Me, Myself & I"
408	January 26, 2016	Josh Brolin, Kate McKinnon	Billy Ocean
Presidential Candidate Poetry; Tariq challenges Jimmy to count out mathematical number; Jimmy announces week of shows in Los Angeles; Tonight Show Pros & Cons: Going to the Super Bowl; Jimmy shaves off Josh Brolin's mustache; Kate McKinnon comes out wearing a fake mustache; Tonight Show First Impressions (Josh Brolin, Kate McKinnon); Billy Ocean performed "Suddenly/Caribbean Queen"
409	January 27, 2016	Natalie Portman, John Oliver	Sia
Presidential Candidates' Opinions on Absence of Donald Trump at Debate; Fox News Debate Commercial; Tonight Show Ice–skiing Questions; Jimmy mentions American Masters installment; Tonight Show Popular Mathematics; Jimmy, Sia, Natalie Portman and The Roots performed "Iko Iko"; Sia performed "Cheap Thrills"

=== February ===
No.	Original release date	Guest(s)	Musical/entertainment guest(s)
410	February 3, 2016	Martin Scorsese, Gillian Jacobs	The Chainsmokers
Donald Trump gives speech; Tonight Show Superlatives; Tonight Show 5–Second Summaries (Martin Scorsese); The Chainsmokers performed "Roses"
411	February 4, 2016	Jonah Hill, Megyn Kelly	Wiz Khalifa
Jimmy announces The Tonight Show second anniversary special; Tonight Show Puppy Predictors: Super Bowl 50 Edition; Tonight Show #hashtags: #SuperBowlRaps; Tonight Show Emotional Interview (Jonah Hill); Wiz Khalifa performed "Bake Sale"
412	February 5, 2016	Rebel Wilson, Jack Huston	Nathaniel Rateliff & The Night Sweats
Thank You Notes; Chubby Bunny (Rebel Wilson); "Single Life" music video (Rebel Wilson); Chubby Zombie (Jack Huston); Nathaniel Rateliff & The Night Sweats performed "I Need Never Get Old"
413	February 8, 2016	Ben Stiller, Morena Baccarin	Dan White
Presidential Candidate Super Bowl 50 Quotes; Jimmy congratulates Dave Diomedi on his DGA Award win; Tonight Show Screengrabs; Ben Stiller's Super Bowl 50 commercial
414	February 9, 2016	Ryan Reynolds, Katie Holmes	Thomas Rhett
Questlove and Tariq re-enact a scene from The Bachelor; Tonight Show Pros & Cons: Valentine's Day; Musical Beers (Jimmy Fallon, Katie Holmes, Ryan Reynolds, The Roots); Thomas Rhett performed "Die a Happy Man"
415	February 10, 2016	Penélope Cruz, Peyton Manning, Magic Johnson	Halsey
Terminator Vs. Presidential Candidates; Bernie Sanders gives speech; Penélope Cruz and Jimmy use Dubsmash; Peyton Manning reads Tonight Show Superlatives for Jimmy; Egg Russian Roulette (Peyton Manning, Magic Johnson); Halsey performed "Colors"
416	February 11, 2016	Kristen Wiig, Bob Odenkirk	Elle King
Posts on Jeb Bush's Facebook Wall; Freestylin' with The Roots; Kristen Wiig appeared as Peyton Manning; Rapid Fire Round (Kristen Wiig); Kristen Wiig throws golden football; Bob Odenkirk introduces his entourage; Bob Odenkirk catches everyone up on Better Call Saul; Elle King performed "America's Sweetheart"
Special	February 14, 2016	Review of two years' worth of guests, sketches, and musical performances	N/A
The show's two-hour, second anniversary special. Note: This episode counted as a special and not a regular episode.
417	February 15, 2016	Will Ferrell, Christina Aguilera	2 Chainz & Lil Wayne
From Universal Studios Hollywood: "Going Back to Cali" cold open (appearance by LL Cool J); Jimmy jumps through Randy's Donuts sign; Tight Pants (Will Ferrell, Christina Aguilera); 2 Chainz & Lil Wayne performed "Rolls Royce Weather Every Day"
418	February 16, 2016	Zach Galifianakis, Ronda Rousey	Pitbull featuring Robin Thicke, Joe Perry & Travis Barker
From Universal Studios Hollywood: Donald Trump visits his family (appearance by Fuller House cast); Tonight Show True Confessions (Zach Galifianakis, Bill Maher); Pitbull featuring Robin Thicke, Joe Perry & Travis Barker performed "Bad Man"
419	February 17, 2016	Jennifer Lopez, Jay Leno	ZAYN
From Universal Studios Hollywood: Jay Leno subs in for Jimmy's monologue; Ew! sketch (Jennifer Lopez); Password (Jimmy Fallon & Jennifer Lopez Vs. Questlove & Khloé Kardashian); ZAYN performed "It's You"; Note: Snoop Dogg was scheduled; however due to traffic he was unable to make it on time and Leno was interviewed.
420	February 18, 2016	Vince Vaughn, Ryan Seacrest	Dead & Company
From Universal Studios Hollywood: Tonight Show Audience Suggestion Box (audience member hugs Drew Carey, Jimmy shoots hoops against Kareem Abdul-Jabbar, Tariq raps about Oscar nominees, USC Trojans Drumline plays with Questlove); Box of Lies (Vince Vaughn); Dead & Company performed "Shakedown Street"
421	February 19, 2016	Bryan Cranston, Demi Lovato	The Weeknd
From Universal Studios Hollywood: Jimmy sings goodbye to Los Angeles (appearance by Carol Burnett); Thank You Notes; Bryan Cranston gives mock Oscar acceptance speech; Bathtub Interview (Bryan Cranston); Tonight Show Wheel of Musical Impressions (Demi Lovato); The Weeknd performed "In the Night" with Ms. Lauryn Hill
422	February 22, 2016	Taron Egerton & Hugh Jackman, Audra McDonald	Daryl Hall & John Oates
How Jeb Bush's Campaign Money Was Actually Spent; Friends reboot video; The Yahoo! Answers Lounge Singers (Audra McDonald); Catchphrase (Jimmy Fallon & Steve Higgins Vs. Hugh Jackman & Taron Egerton); Daryl Hall & John Oates performed "I Can't Go for That (No Can Do)"
423	February 23, 2016	Kevin Spacey, Bill & Melinda Gates	Kygo
Tonight Show Pros & Cons: The Academy Awards; Kevin Spacey and Jimmy take an Instagram photo; Masterclass Junior (Kevin Spacey); Bill & Melinda Gates dance video; Kygo performed "Stole the Show"
424	February 24, 2016	Taraji P. Henson, Mike Birbiglia	FKA twigs
Jimmy announces ten million YouTube channel subscribers; Tonight Show In Reply To; The Acting Game (Taraji P. Henson); FKA twigs performed "Good to Love"
425	February 25, 2016	Gerard Butler, Jenny Slate	The 1975
Facebook Reactions Suggestions; Life on the Line Trailer Mistakes; Tonight Show #hashtags: #MyHometownIsWeird; Slapjack (Gerard Butler); The 1975 performed "The Sound"
426	February 26, 2016	Nathan Lane, Keri Russell	Mary Lynn Rajskub
Thank You Notes; Pyramid (Jimmy Fallon & Nathan Lane Vs. Tariq & Keri Russell)
427	February 29, 2016	Steve Martin & Edie Brickell, Martin Freeman	Cast of Bright Star
Tonight Show Do Not Read; Steve Martin's musical number; cast of Bright Star performed "Sun's Gonna Shine"

=== March ===
No.	Original release date	Guest(s)	Musical/entertainment guest(s)
428	March 1, 2016	Margot Robbie, Michael McKean, Kevin Delaney	N/A
Poll Stickers; Donald Trump Audio Tape; Celebrity Quotes; Jimmy Greene sits in with The Roots; Tonight Show Pros & Cons: Facebook's New Emojis; Tonight Show Whisper Challenge (Margot Robbie)
429	March 2, 2016	Tina Fey, Rachel Maddow	Santigold
Donald Trump gives speech; Tonight Show Know It All (Tina Fey Vs. Rachel Maddow); Santigold performed "Can't Get Enough of Myself"
430	March 3, 2016	Pharrell Williams, Priyanka Chopra	Loretta Lynn
Airline Basic Economy Features; Jesse Frederick's Tonight Show theme song; Tonight Show #hashtags: #MySiblingIsWeird; Priyanka Chopra and Jimmy have a wing-eating contest; Loretta Lynn performed "Everything It Takes"
431	March 4, 2016	Gwyneth Paltrow, Tyler Oakley	The Who
Thank You Notes; Gwyneth Paltrow and Jimmy eat french fries with Goop skin care products; Tonight Show First Textual Experience (Gwyneth Paltrow); Face Swap (Tyler Oakley); The Who performed "Who Are You"
432	March 14, 2016	Shailene Woodley, Eugene Levy & Catherine O'Hara	Aurora
Freestylin' with The Roots; Pictionary (Shailene Woodley & Catherine O'Hara Vs. Jimmy Fallon & Eugene Levy); Aurora performed "Conqueror"
433	March 15, 2016	Jesse Eisenberg, Zoë Kravitz, Chris Martin	Coldplay
Tonight Show Pros & Cons: Going to Trump University; Zoë Kravitz brings Dark 'N' Stormys; Inflatable Flip Cup (Zoë Kravitz); Coldplay performed "Up&Up"
434	March 16, 2016	Jennifer Garner, Cuba Gooding Jr.	Pete Yorn
Tonight Show Picture This; Tonight Show Truth or Door (Jennifer Garner, Cuba Gooding Jr.); Pete Yorn performed "Lost Weekend"
435	March 17, 2016	Clive Owen, Nia Vardalos	Jimmy Carr
The Roots wish viewers Happy St. Patrick's Day; Us Weekly 25 Things You Didn't Know About Me: Ted Cruz; Tonight Show #hashtags: #DontJudgeMe; Tonight Show Kid Letters; Clive Owen and Jimmy have Guinness
436	March 18, 2016	John Krasinski, Melissa Benoist	Mike Posner
Safe Plastics Day; Easter Vs. Nor'easter; Bumble Bee Foods Statement; Thank You Notes; Tonight Show Word Sneak (John Krasinski); Melissa Benoist teaches Jimmy how to stack cups; Mike Posner performed "I Took a Pill in Ibiza"
437	March 21, 2016	Jake Gyllenhaal, Paul Reubens	Rita Wilson
Different hairstyles on Jimmy Fallon; Point Pleasant Police Department (Jake Gyllenhaal); Paul Reubens hides something on the set for Joe Manganiello; Paul Reubens plays the balloon; Rita Wilson performed "Along for the Ride"
438	March 22, 2016	Don Cheadle, Saoirse Ronan	Iggy Azalea
Carnival Cruise Line Slogans; Tonight Show Pros & Cons: Going on Spring Break; Catchphrase (Don Cheadle & Steve Higgins Vs. Jimmy Fallon & Saoirse Ronan); Jimmy gives Saoirse Ronan board games; Iggy Azalea performed "Team"
439	March 23, 2016	Ice-T, Allison Williams	Gabriel Iglesias
Don Cheadle sits in with The Roots; Tonight Show Screengrabs; Ice-T brings out his new baby; Ice-T does voice-overs
440	March 24, 2016	Ben Affleck, Zoe Lister-Jones	ZAYN
Notice of passing of Garry Shandling at top of broadcast; Tonight Show Video Mixtape; Tonight Show #hashtags: #WeddingFail; Tonight Show Pup Quiz (Ben Affleck); ZAYN performed "Like I Would"
441	March 25, 2016	Amy Adams, Timothy Olyphant	Brett Eldredge
Where My Peeps At?; Jimmy acknowledges death of Garry Shandling; Thank You Notes; Amy Adams cries on cue; Tonight Show Box of Microphones (Amy Adams); Brett Eldredge performed "Drunk on Your Love"
442	March 28, 2016	Claire Danes, Sullivan Stapleton	Bonnie Raitt
Tonight Show 3 Things You Might Not Know; Tonight Show Do Not Play; Tonight Show Fast Family Feud (Claire Danes); Sullivan Stapleton shows scarred injury; Bonnie Raitt performed "Gypsy in Me"
443	March 29, 2016	Susan Sarandon, John Cena	Michael Stipe
Tonight Show Pros & Cons: Taking a Carnival Cruise to Cuba; Sticky Balls (John Cena); Michael Stipe performed "The Man Who Sold the World"
444	March 30, 2016	James Spader, Colin Hanks	Bibi Bourelly
Presidential Candidate Dates; Tonight Show Audience Suggestion Box (Tonight Show Random Cam, election coverage dubbed with Pee-wee Herman, Jimmy & The Roots Vs. Harlem Globetrotters); Bibi Bourelly performed "Sally"
445	March 31, 2016	Taylor Lautner, Sean "Diddy" Combs	Weezer
Marriage Questionnaire; Tonight Show #hashtags: #MyKidIsWeird; Milky Cow (Taylor Lautner); Random Object Shootout (Taylor Lautner); Weezer performed "King of the World"

=== April ===
No.	Original release date	Guest(s)	Musical/entertainment guest(s)
446	April 1, 2016	Aaron Paul, Governor Chris Christie	Nate Bargatze
Election Romance Novels; Now That's What I Call Music! Commercial; Wendy Melvoin sits in with The Roots; Puppy Predictors: 2016 Final Four Edition; Thank You Notes; Jimmy gives Chris Christie a gold candy dish
447	April 4, 2016	Melissa McCarthy, Bobby Cannavale	Wild Belle
Jeb Bush Speech Titles; Tonight Show Facebook Comments; Melissa McCarthy brings Jimmy a turtleneck tie; Lip Sync Battle (Melissa McCarthy); Wild Belle performed "Throw Down Your Guns"
448	April 5, 2016	Greg Kinnear, Padma Lakshmi	Andrew Dice Clay
Tonight Show Pros & Cons: Chipotle Opening a Burger Chain; Tonight Show Bad Signs
449	April 6, 2016	Cameron Diaz, Jon Favreau	Alessia Cara
Chad Smith sits in with The Roots; Tonight Show Popular Mathematics; Drinko (Cameron Diaz); Jon Favreau gives Jimmy a The Jungle Book coin; Alessia Cara performed "Wild Things"
450	April 7, 2016	Russell Crowe, Jonathan Groff	The Lumineers
Gangster Turkey Quote; The Sugarhill Gang sits in with The Roots; Tonight Show #hashtags: #SpringRaps; Russell Crowe brings Jimmy a hat; Russell Crowe's birthday; Russell Crowe and Jimmy have fairy bread; Box of Lies (Russell Crowe); Jonathan Groff performs a mock ceremony; The Lumineers performed "Ophelia"
451	April 8, 2016	Kerry Washington, Ken Jeong	Dion
Thank You Notes; Famous Face–Off (Kerry Washington & Jimmy Fallon Vs. Steve Higgins & Ken Jeong); Ken Jeong performed "Three Times a Lady"; Dion performed "Ride with You"
452	April 11, 2016	Sir Ben Kingsley, Common	Ice Cube & Common
North Korea Rocket Launch Test Footage; Tonight Show Obama Expressions; GE Tonight Show Fallonventions: Kid's Inventions; Jimmy lip syncs to Sir Ben Kingsley; Common break-dances; Ice Cube & Common performed "Real People"
453	April 12, 2016	Amy Schumer, Richard Linklater	Zara Larsson
Jimmy congratulates Questlove on his Grammy Award win and new book; Tonight Show Pros & Cons: Campaigning in New York; Tonight Show Explain This Photo (Amy Schumer); Zara Larsson performed "Never Forget You"
454	April 13, 2016	Ice Cube, Ellie Kemper	Conrad Sewell
Chicago Melon; Tonight Show Zoomed In; Tonight Show Battle of the Instant Songwriters; Ellie Kemper announces pregnancy and Jimmy gives her The Tonight Show Starring Jimmy Fallon ice cream; Conrad Sewell performed "Remind Me"
455	April 14, 2016	Hugh Laurie, Senator Ted Cruz	Future
Donald Trump Phone Call (appearance by Ted Cruz); Tonight Show #hashtags: #MyGeniusIdea; Future performed "Wicked"
456	April 15, 2016	Robert De Niro, Jesse Tyler Ferguson	Nick Guerra
Old TSA Policy Vs. New TSA Policy; Tonight Show Kid Impressions: Donald Trump Edition; Thank You Notes
457	April 25, 2016	Ricky Gervais, Ariana Grande	Ariana Grande
Film Posters; Jimmy and Questlove acknowledge the death of Prince; Casual Lip Sync (Ariana Grande); Ariana Grande's dog comes out; Ariana Grande performed "Dangerous Woman"
458	April 26, 2016	Chelsea Handler, Eric Bana	D'Angelo & Princess (Maya Rudolph + Gretchen Lieberum)
Tonight Show Pros & Cons: The New Season of Game of Thrones; Jimmy promotes the Lexus GS F; Tonight Show Truth or Truth (Chelsea Handler); D'Angelo & Princess performed "Sometimes It Snows in April"
459	April 27, 2016	Matt Lauer, Gisele Bündchen	Fitz and the Tantrums
Real Effects of Aging; Tonight Show 3 Things You Might Not Know; Tonight Show Audience Suggestion Box (Tariq raps recap of Game of Thrones); Gisele Bündchen teaches Jimmy how to walk a runway; Fitz and the Tantrums performed "Hand Clap"
460	April 28, 2016	Adam Levine, Michael Shannon	Rae Sremmurd
Campaign Slogans; Tonight Show #hashtags: #MyPetIsWeird; Freestylin' with The Roots; Rae Sremmurd performed "Look Alive"
461	April 29, 2016	Paul Rudd, Hugh Dancy	Jack Whitehall
Thank You Notes; Paul Rudd and Jimmy recreate "Too Much Time on My Hands" music video

=== May ===
No.	Original release date	Guest(s)	Musical/entertainment guest(s)
462	May 2, 2016	Louis C.K., Questlove	Rufus Wainwright
Republican Quotes; Tonight Show Do Not Read; Rufus Wainwright performed "Zing! Went the Strings of My Heart"
463	May 3, 2016	Chris Evans, Marc Maron	Little Big Shots
Lecrae sits in with The Roots; Tonight Show Pros & Cons: Going to Prom; Frozen Blackjack (Chris Evans); The Tonight Show Presents Little Big Shots
464	May 4, 2016	Jeremy Renner, Fran Lebowitz	Grimes
Donald Trump Phone Call; Musical Beers (Jimmy Fallon, Captain America: Civil War cast); Grimes performed "Flesh without Blood"
465	May 5, 2016	Robert Downey Jr., Amy Sedaris	Chance the Rapper
Tonight Show Puppy Predictors: 2016 Kentucky Derby Edition; Tonight Show #hashtags: #MomQuotes; Robert Downey Jr. gives Jimmy acting lessons; Amy Sedaris brings Jimmy a painting; Amy Sedaris and Jimmy wear sprinkles; Chance the Rapper performed "Blessings"
466	May 6, 2016	Jane Fonda, Andrew Rannells	Keith Urban
Tonight Show Bottled Grump and Glittery Mittens; Thank You Notes; FML (Keith Urban); Giant Beer Pong (Jane Fonda); Keith Urban performed "Wasted Time"
467	May 9, 2016	Jodie Foster, Daveed Diggs	Graham Nash
Tonight Show Bad Signs; Egg Russian Roulette (Jodie Foster); Daveed Diggs raps; Graham Nash performed "This Path Tonight"
468	May 10, 2016	David Spade, Mrs. Laura Bush & Jenna Bush Hager	Tegan and Sara
Tonight Show Pros & Cons: Being Donald Trump's Vice President; Jimmy promotes Bud Light; Tegan and Sara performed "Boyfriend"
469	May 11, 2016	Jada Pinkett Smith, Andy Cohen	Gallant
Queen Elizabeth II Quotes; Tonight Show Superlatives; Bonk!; Famous Face–Off (Jada Pinkett-Smith & Jimmy Fallon Vs. Tariq & Andy Cohen); Gallant performed "Weight in Gold"
470	May 12, 2016	Drake, Megyn Kelly	Meghan Trainor
Emily Wells sits in with The Roots; Tonight Show #hashtags: #ImDumb; Drake and Jimmy put mini cutouts of album image on the set; Drake and Jimmy have whiskey; Faceketball (Drake); Meghan Trainor performed "Me Too"; Note: Trainor fell to the floor shortly after her performance.
471	May 13, 2016	Kit Harington, Rose Byrne	Blake Shelton
Pick–up Lines; Shaq Podcast; Thank You Notes; Charades (Kit Harington & Rose Byrne Vs. Jimmy Fallon & Blake Shelton); Blake Shelton performed "Came Here to Forget"
472	May 16, 2016	Andy Samberg, Gigi Hadid	The Kills
Old Worker Quotes; Jimmy Fallon, The Lonely Island & The Roots sing "I'm on a Boat" with classroom instruments; Catchphrase (Andy Samberg & Gigi Hadid Vs. Bryce Harper & Jimmy Fallon); Gigi Hadid and Jimmy have burgers; The Kills performed "Doing It to Death"
473	May 17, 2016	Miley Cyrus, Josh Gad, Anthony Bourdain & Mario Batali	N/A
What Cats Are Really Saying; Tonight Show Pros & Cons: Traveling by "Hyperloop"; Tonight Show Funny Face Off (Miley Cyrus); Food Pyramid (Jimmy Fallon & Mario Batali Vs. Anthony Bourdain & Josh Gad)
474	May 18, 2016	Zac Efron, Carmelo Anthony	OneRepublic
Soap Opera Clip; Tonight Show Audience Suggestion Box (Two Really Fun Men performed an original song, Jimmy does a dance with Carmelo Anthony); Zac Efron and Jimmy wear wigs; Water War (Zac Efron); OneRepublic performed "Wherever I Go"
475	May 19, 2016	Seth Rogen, Fred Armisen	Corinne Bailey Rae
Tonight Show #hashtags: #MyWeirdNeighbor; Tonight Show Kid Standup (Seth Rogen); Fred Armisen and Jimmy read each others' minds; Corinne Bailey Rae performed "Green Aphrodisiac"
476	May 20, 2016	Billy Crystal, Beanie Feldstein	Flatbush Zombies
Thank You Notes; Billy Crystal and Jimmy do impressions at the hospital; Flatbush Zombies performed "Bounce"
477	May 23, 2016	Jennifer Lawrence, George Lopez	Tom Odell
Obama Quotes; Tonight Show Do Not Play; Tonight Show True Confessions (Jennifer Lawrence, John Oliver); Tom Odell performed "Magnetize"
478	May 24, 2016	Tyler Perry, Dave Franco	Harland Williams
Questlove and Tariq re-enact a scene from The Bachelorette; Tonight Show Pros & Cons: Throwing a Memorial Day BBQ; Blake Shelton Tries Sushi; Gimmie One (Tyler Perry); Dave Franco shows Jimmy how to throw cards
479	May 25, 2016	Adam Sandler, Karlie Kloss	Anderson Paak & The Free Nationals featuring T.I.
Service men and women in the audience; Horror Film Sequel Titles; Tonight Show Superlatives; Adam Sandler and Jimmy performed a song for the troops ("Friends on All Bases", to the tune of "Friends in Low Places"); Adam Sandler invites audience to his stand-up tour; Karlie Kloss teaches Jimmy how to pose mid-air; Anderson Paak & The Free Nationals featuring T.I. performed "Come Down"
480	May 26, 2016	Penélope Cruz, Jeff Daniels	Dierks Bentley
Musiq Soulchild sits in with The Roots; Jimmy tries on Musiq Soulchild's hat; Tonight Show #hashtags: #SummerRaps; Penélope Cruz styles Jimmy's hair; Tonight Show Dubsmash (Penélope Cruz); Dierks Bentley performed "Somewhere on a Beach"
481	May 27, 2016	Maya Rudolph & Martin Short, Leslie Odom Jr.	Courtney Barnett
TSA Signs; Thank You Notes; Maya Rudolph & Martin Short bring Jimmy a pie; The Windy City Blue (Maya Rudolph & Martin Short); Leslie Odom Jr. burps; Courtney Barnett performed "New Speedway Boogie"

=== June ===
No.	Original release date	Guest(s)	Musical/entertainment guest(s)
482	June 6, 2016	Daniel Radcliffe, Mel B	Maren Morris
Song Lyrics; Tonight Show Screengrabs; Daniel Radcliffe tries on outfit; Maren Morris performed "My Church"
483	June 7, 2016	Ethan Hawke, Freddie Prinze Jr.	Ingrid Michaelson
Tonight Show Pros & Cons: The NBA Finals; FML (Ethan Hawke); Jimmy gives Ethan Hawke his Saturday Night Live jacket; Ingrid Michaelson performed "Hell No"
484	June 8, 2016	Mark Ruffalo, Paula Patton	The Lucas Brothers
Trump University Survey Questions; Tonight Show Superlatives; Freestylin' with The Roots; The Best Friends Challenge (Mark Ruffalo); Jimmy gives Paula Patton a "Best Friends" necklace
485	June 9, 2016	President Barack Obama	Madonna
Slow Jam the News (Barack Obama); Thank You Notes; (Barack Obama); Madonna performed "Borderline"
486	June 10, 2016	Ryan Seacrest, Cedric the Entertainer	Chris Young featuring Vince Gill
Dog Quotes; Thank You Notes; Jimmy tries on shirt; Pictionary (Jimmy Fallon & Cedric the Entertainer Vs. Ryan Seacrest & Steve Higgins); Cedric the Entertainer and Jimmy try on wigs; Chris Young featuring Vince Gill performed "Sober Saturday Night"
487	June 13, 2016	Liam Hemsworth, Nick Jonas	Nick Jonas
Jimmy acknowledges the Orlando nightclub shooting at the top of the program; Tonight Show Do Not Read; Slip n'Flip (Liam Hemsworth); Nick Jonas and Jimmy redo a game; Nick Jonas gives audience concert tickets; Nick Jonas performed "Close"
488	June 14, 2016	Don Rickles, Lena Dunham	DJ Shadow featuring Run the Jewels
Steph Curry Products; Donald Trump Accomplishments; Tonight Show Pros & Cons: Father's Day; Regis Philbin brings out a birthday cake for Don Rickles; Box of Lies (Lena Dunham); DJ Shadow featuring Run the Jewels performed "Nobody Speak"
489	June 15, 2016	Jay Leno, Jeff Goldblum	A-F-R-O, Wale
Jay Leno subs in for Jimmy's monologue; Bruce Hornsby and Sonny Emory sit in with The Roots; Tonight Show Audience Suggestion Box (Hashtag the Panda dances to "Panda", The Tariq & Adler Show, Box of Freestyle (A-F-R-O); Jeff Goldblum teaches Jimmy chiropratic moves; Wale performed "My PYT"
490	June 16, 2016	Dwayne Johnson, Jim Gaffigan	Phantogram
Riley Rowin; Howard Jones sits in with The Roots; Tonight Show #hashtags: #DadQuotes; Saugerties High School Senior Prom (Dwayne Johnson); Jimmy brings out candy for Dwayne Johnson; Phantogram performed "You Don't Get Me High Anymore"
491	June 17, 2016	Ricky Gervais, Tony Hale	Brian Regan
Tonight Show I've Got Good News and Good News; Father's Day Dad Rap; Thank You Notes; Ricky Gervais does terrible impressions
492	June 20, 2016	Blake Lively, Luke Wilson	Mumford & Sons featuring Baaba Maal & Beatenberg
Tonight Show Good Name Bad Name Great Name; Tonight Show Know It All (Blake Lively); Jimmy gives Blake Lively a cardboard cutout of himself; Luke Wilson brings Jimmy a book; Mumford & Sons featuring Baaba Maal & Beatenberg performed "There Will Be Time"
493	June 21, 2016	Whoopi Goldberg, Ben Simmons, Kevin Delaney	N/A
Republican Phone Call Audio; Hillary Clinton Film Titles; Cat Quotes; Tonight Show Pros & Cons: Microsoft Getting Into the Weed Business; Two Neil Youngs on a Tree Stump (appearance by Neil Young); Whoopi Goldberg brings Jimmy candy; Whoopi Goldberg and Jimmy sit in the audience; Jimmy gives Ben Simmons a cheesesteak
494	June 22, 2016	Gordon Ramsay, Elle Fanning, Jack Aiello	Macklemore & Ryan Lewis
NBC Sunday Night Football Theme Song; Donald Trump Speech (appearance by Jack Aiello); Gordon Ramsay comes out with crutches and a foot cast; Gordon Ramsay and Jimmy have cocktails; Jimmy gives Elle Fanning a high school graduation present; Catchphrase (Jimmy Fallon & Macklemore & Ryan Lewis Vs. Elle Fanning & Steve Higgins); Jack Aiello does impressions; Macklemore & Ryan Lewis performed "Dance Off"
495	June 23, 2016	Will Forte, Ashley Benson	Joseph
Tim Calhoun (Will Forte); Tonight Show #hashtags: #HowIGotFired; Will Forte and Jason Sudeikis performed "Can't Fight This Feeling"; Ashley Benson and Jimmy take videos; Joseph performed "White Flag"
496	June 24, 2016	Jim Parsons, J. J. Watt	The Avett Brothers
Thank You Notes; J. J. Watt and Jimmy take a picture; Egg Russian Roulette (J. J. Watt); The Avett Brothers performed "Satan Pulls the Strings"

=== July ===
No.	Original release date	Guest(s)	Musical/entertainment guest(s)
497	July 11, 2016	Kristen Stewart, Chris Colfer	Shawn Mendes
Horse Quote; Newt Gingrich Resume; Tonight Show Popular Mathematics; Kristen Stewart shows her new tattoo; Jello Shot Twister (Kristen Stewart); Shawn Mendes performed "Treat You Better"
498	July 12, 2016	Melissa McCarthy, Christian Slater	Jennifer Lopez & Lin-Manuel Miranda
Tonight Show Pros & Cons: Shopping on Amazon; Tonight Show Word Sneak (Melissa McCarthy); Jennifer Lopez & Lin-Manuel Miranda performed "Love Make The World Go Round"
499	July 13, 2016	Kristen Wiig, Rami Malek	Benjamin Clementine
Cookbook Chapters; Ariana Grande and Jimmy in Snapchat music video for "Into You"; Tonight Show Bad Signs; Kristen Wiig comes out as JoJo Fletcher; Kristen Wiig and Jimmy performed a song; Benjamin Clementine performed "Cornerstone"
500	July 14, 2016	Michael Strahan, Parker Posey	Margo Price
Tonight Show #hashtags: #HadToDoIt; Face Breakers (Michael Strahan); Parker Posey brings Jimmy a 500 episode celebration cake and comes out with balloons tied to herself; Margo Price performed "Four Years of Chances"
501	July 15, 2016	Blake Lively, Rachel Maddow	Good Charlotte
Bernie Sanders Book Titles; Ray Parker Jr. sits in with The Roots; Thank You Notes; Password (Blake Lively & Jimmy Fallon Vs. Good Charlotte); Jimmy gives Rachel Maddow jerky; Good Charlotte performed "Life Can't Get Much Better"
502	July 18, 2016	Chris Pine, Joanna Lumley	Troye Sivan
Mike Pence Tweets; Tonight Show Do Not Watch; Inflatable Flip Cup (Chris Pine); Joanna Lumley and Jimmy have champagne; Troye Sivan performed "Wild"
503	July 19, 2016	Idris Elba, Heidi Klum	Lukas Graham
Tonight Show Pros & Cons: The Republican National Convention; Donald Trump Speech; Idris Elba dances; Tonight Show Box of Microphones (Idris Elba); Heidi Klum performed a German song; Lukas Graham performed "Mama Said"
504	July 20, 2016	Mila Kunis, Mike Birbiglia	A$AP Mob
Mike Pence Quotes; Tonight Show Audience Suggestion Box (Steve Higgins and Jimmy play Corn Hole, Bernie Williams plays whiffle ball, Jimmy does a cannonball); Tonight Show Filtered Scenes (Mila Kunis); A$AP Mob performed "Yamborghini High"
505	July 21, 2016	Alicia Vikander, Celine Dion	Celine Dion
Tonight Show Split the Difference; Tonight Show #hashtags: #IGotBusted; Pen in Bottle (Alicia Vikander); Tonight Show Wheel of Musical Impressions (Celine Dion); Celine Dion performed "The Show Must Go On"
506	July 22, 2016	Simon Cowell, Lilly Singh	Penn & Teller
The Tonight Show Recap; Tonight Show The Meme–ing of Art; Thank You Notes; Lilly Singh announces release of her first book; Jimmy Meets Lilly Singh's Parents (Lilly Singh)
507	July 25, 2016	Denis Leary, Shay Mitchell	G-Eazy
Tim Kaine Instagram Photos; Corey Henry sits in with The Roots; Tonight Show Good Name Bad Name Great Name; Catchphrase (Jimmy Fallon & Denis Leary Vs. G-Eazy & Shay Mitchell); G-Eazy performed "Drifting"
508	July 26, 2016	Michael Fassbender, Abby Elliott	Bastille
Tonight Show Pros & Cons: The Democratic National Convention; Pen in Bottle (Michael Fassbender); Frozen Blackjack (Michael Fassbender); Abby Elliott gives Jimmy a dollar; Bastille performed "Good Grief"
509	July 27, 2016	Matt Damon, David Feherty	Sturgill Simpson
Army Representative Quotes; Tonight Show 3 Things You Might Not Know; Box of Lies (Matt Damon); Sturgill Simpson performed "All Around You"
510	July 28, 2016	Will Smith	Usher
Candidate Photos; The Tonight Show Recap; Tonight Show #hashtags: #WorstFirstDate; Will Smith re-does his intro; Will Smith and Jimmy plan a trip; Usher performed "Crash"
511	July 29, 2016	Margot Robbie, Nick Cannon, Martha Stewart	N/A
Thank You Notes; Tonight Show Jinx Challenge (Margot Robbie); Jimmy Snapchats cooking segment

=== August ===
No.	Original release date	Guest(s)	Musical/entertainment guest(s)
512	August 1, 2016	Jared Leto, John Turturro	Bishop Briggs
Facebook Headlines; Leslie Odom Jr. sits in with The Roots; Tonight Show Screengrabs; Jared Leto brings Jimmy a gift; Tonight Show Pup Quiz (Jared Leto); Bishop Briggs performed "River"
513	August 2, 2016	Jonah Hill, Jaden Smith	Dua Lipa
Tonight Show Netflix Picks; Tonight Show Pros & Cons: The Olympics in Rio; Jonah Hill and Jimmy Take a Drawing Class; Dua Lipa performed "Hotter than Hell"
514	August 3, 2016	Aziz Ansari, Carla Gugino	Jeff Dye
Chad Smith sits in with The Roots; Tonight Show YouTube Premiere; Tonight Show First Textual Experience (Aziz Ansari)
515	August 4, 2016	Miles Teller, Keri Russell	Steven Tyler
United States Badminton team performed "Badminton Boogie"; Writer orders Slurpee by drone; Facebook Messages; Tonight Show #hashtags: #WhyDidISayThat; Slip and Flip (Miles Teller); Steven Tyler performed "We're All Somebody from Somewhere"
516	August 5, 2016	Jerry Seinfeld, Seth Rogen	Jason Derulo
Olympic Memes; Thank You Notes; Lip Sync Battle (Seth Rogen); Jason Derulo performed "Kiss the Sky"
517	August 22, 2016	Robert De Niro, Jordan Spieth	Martin Garrix & Bebe Rexha
Ryan Lochte Endorsements; Tonight Show Do Not Read; Freestylin' with The Roots; Jordan Spieth attempts to drive a marshmallow into Jimmy's mouth; Martin Garrix & Bebe Rexha performed "In the Name of Love"
518	August 23, 2016	Dolly Parton, Donald Glover, U.S. Women's Gymnastics Team	Dolly Parton
Real Briefing Vs. Trump Briefing; Tonight Show Pros & Cons: Returning Home with a Gold Medal; Hungry Hungry Humans (Simone Biles & Jimmy Fallon Vs. Laurie Hernandez & Aly Raisman Vs. Gabby Douglas & Madison Kocian Vs. Tariq & Donald Glover); Dolly Parton performed "Pure & Simple"
519	August 24, 2016	Aaron Paul, Tig Notaro	Florida Georgia Line
James Valentine sits in with The Roots; Bonk!; Jimmy debuts the show's new app; Aaron Paul uses the app; Musical Beers (Aaron Paul, Tig Notaro, Florida Georgia Line); Jimmy uses the new app; Florida Georgia Line performed "H.O.L.Y."
520	August 25, 2016	Barbra Streisand, Alec Baldwin	Barbra Streisand & Alec Baldwin
Tonight Show #hashtags: #MyDumbLie; Barbra Streisand and Jimmy as Donald Trump performed a duet; Barbra Streisand & Alec Baldwin performed "The Best Thing That Ever Has Happened"
521	August 26, 2016	Jessica Alba, Jeff Foxworthy	Jeff Foxworthy
The Tower Opening Credits; Hillary Clinton Phone Call; Thank You Notes; Jessica Alba uses the Bonk! app; Roomba Pong (Jessica Alba & Jimmy Fallon Vs. Jeff Foxworthy & Steve Higgins); Jeff Foxworthy did a stand-up comedy bit
522	August 29, 2016	Kevin Bacon, Meghan Trainor	Meghan Trainor featuring Yo Gotti
Tonight Show Picture This; First Drafts of Rock: "Free Fallin'" (Kevin Bacon); Meghan Trainor comes out in a giraffe onesie and brings Jimmy a dinosaur onesie; Meghan Trainor featuring Yo Gotti performed "Better"
523	August 30, 2016	Mel Brooks, Rita Ora	Banks & Steelz
Tonight Show Pros & Cons: Being a Freshman in College; Tonight Show Audience Suggestion Box (Tariq & Adler Podcast, Matt Farley performed an original song); Mel Brooks and Jimmy acknowledge Gene Wilder's death; Banks & Steelz performed "Giant"
524	August 31, 2016	David Spade, The Kids from Stranger Things	Tove Lo
Questlove & David Spade re-enact a scene from Bachelor in Paradise; Frédéric Yonnet sits in with The Roots; Deleted scene from Stranger Things; Stranger Strings (The Kids from Stranger Things); Tove Lo performed "Cool Girl"

=== September ===
No.	Original release date	Guest(s)	Musical/entertainment guest(s)
525	September 1, 2016	Harry Connick Jr., Michael Phelps	Zara Larsson
New Hats; Quarterback Quotes; Tonight Show #hashtags: #MyRoomateIsWeird; Jimmy promotes Masterpass; Harry Connick Jr. plays a miniature piano; Egg Russian Roullette (Michael Phelps); Zara Larsson performed "Lush Life"
526	September 2, 2016	Meg Ryan, Nick Kroll & John Mulaney	Dan White
Writer goes through electric wall; Election Fight Titles; Thank You Notes; Pictionary (Jimmy Fallon & Meg Ryan Vs. Nick Kroll & John Mulaney); Nick Kroll & John Mulaney bring Jimmy a Tonight Show sweatshirt
527	September 6, 2016	Clint Eastwood, Molly Shannon	Mike Posner
Millennial Quotes; Tonight Show Pros & Cons: The New NFL Season; Tonight Show Bad Signs; Clint Eastwood uses the Bonk! app; Mike Posner performed "Be As You Are"
528	September 7, 2016	Michael Strahan, Zachary Quinto, James Cameron	Vince Staples
Tonight Show Don't Quote Me.; Giant Tricycle Race (Michael Strahan); Vince Staples performed "Smile"
529	September 8, 2016	Ariana Grande, Russell Westbrook	Ariana Grande
New Siri Voices; Tonight Show Superlatives; Jimmy tries Ariana Grande's frangrance; Tonight Show Best Friends Challenge (Ariana Grande); Jimmy gives Russell Westbrook a Tonight Show ball; Jimmy tries Russell Westbrook's sunglasses and jewelry; Random Object Football Toss (Russell Westbrook); Ariana Grande performed "Side to Side"
530	September 9, 2016	James Spader, Mandy Moore	Jack White
Tonight Show Fashion Week: Dad Edition; Stewart Lindsey sit in with The Roots; Thank You Notes; Jimmy gives James Spader a signed Jack White album; Jack White performed "Love Is the Truth/You Got Her in Your Pocket"
531	September 12, 2016	Renée Zellweger, Shaquille O'Neal	Eric Church
Stan Wawrinka and Jimmy play Wii Tennis; Tonight Show Good Name Bad Name Great Name; Renée Zellweger and Jimmy do dance moves; Heavyweight Wrestling (Renée Zellweger); Jimmy gives Shaquille O'Neal a framed picture of his last appearance; Jell-O Shot Twister (Shaquille O'Neal); Eric Church performed "Kill a Word"
532	September 13, 2016	Shailene Woodley, Carol Burnett	Jason Aldean
Hillary supporters' illnesses; Wayne Newton sits in with The Roots; Tonight Show Pros & Cons: The Trump–Putin "Bromance"; Tonight Show Whisper Challenge (Carol Burnett); Jason Aldean performed "A Little More Summertime"
533	September 14, 2016	Kevin James, Michael B. Jordan	Bon Iver
Donald Trump's Childhood Home Listing; Tonight Show Superlatives; Kevin James re-does his entrance and prat falls; Slapjack (Kevin James); Jimmy gives Michael B. Jordan a cheesesteak and soda; Michael B. Jordan shows Jimmy his signature handshake; Bon Iver performed "8 (circle)"
534	September 15, 2016	Donald Trump, Norm Macdonald	Kiiara
Colin Powell Quotes; Tortoise Pick–up Lines; Tonight Show #hashtags: #MyTeacherIsWeird; Jimmy gives Donald Trump a mock job interview; Jimmy messes up Donald Trump's hair; Norm MacDonald reads his medical records; Kiiara performed "Gold"
535	September 16, 2016	Miley Cyrus	Miley Cyrus
New Yorker Quotes; Runner Quotes; Tonight Show I've Got Good News and Good News; Thank You Notes; Phone Booth (Miley Cyrus); Miley Cyrus shows Jimmy a yoga move; Miley Cyrus performed "Baby, I'm in the Mood for You"
536	September 19, 2016	Hillary Clinton, Terry Crews	Ariana Grande
Jimmy's birthday; Samsung Slogans; Ew! sketch (with Miley Cyrus); Jimmy gives Hillary Clinton Donald Trump's alleged presents to her; Jimmy reads kids' letters to Hillary Clinton; Terry Crews dances; Ariana Grande performed "Jason's Song (Gave It Away)"
537	September 20, 2016	Mark Wahlberg, Sofía Vergara	MØ
Tonight Show Pros & Cons: Taking a Self-Driving Uber; Giant Slingshot Target Practice (Mark Wahlberg); Mark Wahlberg and Jimmy have watermelon; Sofía Vergara gives Jimmy a Pittsburgh Steelers nail file; Sofía Vergara sucks on a helium balloon; MØ performed "Final Song"
538	September 21, 2016	Kelly Ripa, Priyanka Chopra	Band of Horses
Letter to Santa; Stephen King Novels; Tonight Show Superlatives; Kelly & Jimmy (Tonight Show Word Sneak (Questlove, Kelly Ripa)); Priyanka Chopra and Jimmy bob for apples; Band of Horses performed "Casual Party"
539	September 22, 2016	Hugh Jackman, Ken Jeong	Shawn Mendes
Tonight Show #hashtags: #FallSongs (with Shawn Mendes); Tonight Show Do Not Play; Jimmy gives Hugh Jackman a hat; Tonight Show Turn and Face the Music (Ken Jeong); Shawn Mendes performed "Mercy"
540	September 23, 2016	Will Forte, Haley Bennett, Grace VanderWaal	Grace VanderWaal
Obama Letters; Will Forte sits in with The Roots; Thank You Notes; Will Forte does his Emmy acceptance speech; Haley Bennett brings Jimmy a pie; Chubby Bunny (Grace VanderWaal); Grace VanderWaal performed "Clay"
541	September 26, 2016	Samuel L. Jackson, Gina Rodriguez	The Lemon Twigs
Tonight Show Picture This; Tonight Show Truth or Door (Samuel L. Jackson, Gina Rodriguez); Gina Rodriguez raps; The Lemon Twigs performed "These Words"
542	September 27, 2016	Kate Hudson, David Oyelowo	De La Soul featuring Estelle
Soundcheck Audio; Tonight Show Pros & Cons: Getting a Flu Shot; Tonight Show Audience Suggestion Box (Tod the Turtle makes an appearance, celebrity impersonators re-enact a scene from A Few Good Men, Hashtag the Panda visits a corn maze); David Oyelowo impersonates an elephant; De La Soul featuring Estelle performed "Memory Of... (US)"
543	September 28, 2016	Sting, Kate McKinnon	Sting
Disney Character Issues; Tonight Show Superlatives; Tonight Show First Textual Experience (Sting); Sting performed "I Can't Stop Thinking About You"
544	September 29, 2016	Margot Robbie, Vice President Joe Biden	Metallica
Tonight Show #hashtags: #Badvice; Margot Robbie and Jimmy give each other temporary tattoos; Joe Biden and Jimmy have ice cream cones; Metallica performed "Moth Into Flame"
545	September 30, 2016	Nathan Lane, James Marsden	Nikki Glaser
Jimmy chats with Willie Nelson in his tour bus; Thank You Notes; Tonight Show Fast Family Feud (Nathan Lane); James Marsden uses the Bonk! app

=== October ===
No.	Original release date	Guest(s)	Musical/entertainment guest(s)
546	October 3, 2016	Emily Blunt, Mario Batali	Chance the Rapper
Tonight Show Screengrabs; Box of Lies (Emily Blunt); Mario Batali and Jimmy have roast beef sandwiches; Mario Batali and Jimmy taste test wine; Chance the Rapper performed "Blessings"; Chance the Rapper brings Jimmy a hat; Tariq's birthday
547	October 4, 2016	John Goodman, Lin-Manuel Miranda	Empire of the Sun
Tonight Show VP or TV; Olivia Newton-John sits in with The Roots; Tonight Show Pros & Cons: Disney Buying Twitter; Hashtag the Panda drives John Goodman to Broadway; Lin-Manuel Miranda debuts footage from Hamilton documentary urging people to vote; Tonight Show Wheel of Freestyle (Lin-Manuel Miranda); Empire of the Sun performed "High and Low"; Jimmy and Olivia Newton-John sing "You're the One That I Want"
548	October 5, 2016	Ashton Kutcher, Issa Rae	Norah Jones
Tonight Show Superlatives; Freestylin' with The Roots; Norah Jones performed "Flipside"
549	October 6, 2016	Ben Affleck, Sarah Paulson	Green Day
Jimmy requests an Uber driver; Tonight Show #hashtags: #MyDumbArguement; Tonight Show Kid Theater (Ben Affleck); Sarah Paulson performed "Shoop"; Green Day performed "Bang Bang"
550	October 7, 2016	Tyler Perry, Abigail Spencer	Van Morrison
Thank You Notes; Donald Trump calls Madea for her vote; Abigail Spencer performed "New York, New York"; Van Morrison performed "Too Late"
551	October 10, 2016	Taraji P. Henson, David Harbour	Phish
Doyle Bramhall II sits in with The Roots; Jimmy & Blake Milk a Cow; Password (Taraji P. Henson & Jimmy Fallon Vs. Questlove & Tariq); David Harbour explains his recent injury; Phish performed "Breath and Burning"
552	October 11, 2016	Kevin Hart, Phoebe Waller-Bridge	James Bay
Cards; Football Player Quotes; Tonight Show Pros & Cons: Going to a Netflix Movie Theater; Kevin Hart brings Jimmy underwear; Tonight Show Would You Rather (Kevin Hart); James Bay performed "Hold Back the River"
553	October 12, 2016	Bryan Cranston, Dakota Fanning	Barry Gibb
Silhouette Singing with Barry Gibb; Tonight Show Superlatives; Cranst In, Cranst Out (Bryan Cranston); Dakota Fanning and Jimmy have spaghetti and meatballs; Barry Gibb performed "In the Now"
554	October 13, 2016	Vin Diesel, Norman Reedus	Christine and the Queens
Hillary Clinton Rapper Names; Tonight Show #hashtags: #IOnceOverheard; Jimmy and Kevin Visit a Haunted House; Vin Diesel speaks Korean; Norman Reedus and Jimmy try on motorcycle helmuts; Christine and the Queens performed "Tilted"
555	October 14, 2016	Jon Hamm, Colleen Ballinger	Kings of Leon
Thank You Notes; In the Dusk of Night (Jon Hamm); Colleen Ballinger does her character of Miranda Sings; Kings of Leon performed "Waste a Moment"
556	October 24, 2016	Ricky Gervais, Evan Rachel Wood	Michael Bublé
Tonight Show This Week in Memes; Ricky Gervais gives audience copies of his new book; Tonight Show Random People Random Questions (Ricky Gervais); Michael Bublé performed "Nobody but Me"
557	October 25, 2016	Ethan Hawke, Phil Collins	Phil Collins
Tonight Show Tips: Life Without the Internet; Tonight Show Pros & Cons: Halloween; Tonight Show Today I Learned; Phil Collins performed "In the Air Tonight"
558	October 26, 2016	Justin Timberlake, Tracey Ullman	Stanaj
Facebook Messages; Tonight Show Superlatives; Camp Winnipesaukee (Justin Timberlake); Justin Timberlake and Jimmy throw a pizza party for the audience; Tonight Show Best Friends Challenge (Justin Timberlake); Stanaj performed "Ain't Love Strange"
559	October 27, 2016	Martin Short & Steve Martin, Ruth Negga	Common
Baseball Cards; Jimmy bumps into Martin Short & Steve Martin backstage; Tonight Show #hashtags: #CrappyHalloween; Tonight Show True Confessions (Martin Short & Steve Martin); Common performed "Black America Again"
560	October 28, 2016	Anna Kendrick, John Lithgow	Iliza
Vine User; Chick Corea sits in with The Roots; Thank You Notes; Kids Campfire (Anna Kendrick, John Lithgow); John Lithgow has chicken soup; John Lithgow reads lines from "Monster Mash" as Winston Churchill
561	October 31, 2016	Jay Leno, Gabrielle Union	Big Sean
Jay Leno subs in for Jimmy during the monologue; Tonight Show Good Name Bad Name Great Name; Jay Leno, Gabrielle Union and Jimmy have beef sandwiches; Big Sean performed "Bounce Back"

=== November ===
No.	Original release date	Guest(s)	Musical/entertainment guest(s)
562	November 1, 2016	Whoopi Goldberg, Zoe Lister-Jones	Lecrae featuring Lalah Hathaway
Cleveland Browns Playbook; High Pet Quotes; Tonight Show Netflix Picks; Tonight Show Audience Suggestion Box (Jimmy, Steve Higgins and Questlove snap their fingers to change things, Hashtag the Panda dunks a basketball, Tariq raps, Don Francisco makes an appearance); Whoopi Goldberg brings Jimmy gingerbread men; Jimmy tries on one of Whoopi Goldberg's Christmas sweaters; Lecrae featuring Lalah Hathaway performed "Can't Stop Me Now"
563	November 2, 2016	Vince Vaughn, Patton Oswalt	Nate Bargatze
News Reporter Quotes; Tonight Show Superlatives; Tonight Show Emotional Interview (Vince Vaughn)
564	November 3, 2016	Benedict Cumberbatch, Rachel Maddow	Jim James
Chicago Cubs Player Statistics; Tonight Show #hashtags: #ThatHappened; Benedict Cumberbatch and Jimmy go through a list of Cumberbatch's firsts; Tonight Show Mad Lib Theater (Benedict Cumberbatch); Jim James performed "Here in Spirit"
565	November 4, 2016	Dana Carvey, Alicia Keys	Alicia Keys featuring Young M.A.
Tonight Show I've Got Good News and Good News; Thank You Notes; Dana Carvey and Jimmy do impressions; Tumbleweed Canyon (Dana Carvey); Questlove brings Alicia Keys Krispy Kreme doughnuts; Alicia Keys featuring Young M.A. performed "Blended Family (What You Do for Love)"
566	November 7, 2016	Bill Maher, Anthony Rizzo, Dexter Fowler, Ben Zobrist, Daveed Diggs	MUNA
Tonight Show Obama Expressions; Ultimate Staring Contest (appearance by Alicia Keys); Anthony Rizzo, Dexter Fowler and Ben Zobrist bring out the World Series and Most Valuable Player trophies; Daveed Diggs raps with Tariq; MUNA performed "Loudspeaker"
567	November 9, 2016	Eddie Redmayne, Lily Collins	Martha Wainwright
Republican Quotes; Tonight Show Superlatives; Eddie Redmayne teaches Jimmy a mating dance; Tonight Show Know It All (Eddie Redmayne, Lilly Collins); Martha Wainwright performed "Around the Bend"
568	November 10, 2016	Amy Adams, Joe Buck	Morgane & Chris Stapleton
Dow Jones Index; Starbucks Cup Designs; Seattle Seahawks do Thank You Notes; Tonight Show #hashtags: #NewWeedLaws; Tonight Show Whisper Challenge (Amy Adams); Joe Buck performed "Ring of Fire"; Morgane & Chris Stapleton performed "You Are My Sunshine"
569	November 11, 2016	Jeremy Renner, Michelle Dockery	David Blaine
Jeremy Renner and Jimmy play catch; Thank You Notes; Michelle Dockery reads affirmations; Michelle Dockery and Jimmy use magnetic poetry
570	November 14, 2016	Billy Bob Thornton, Andy Cohen	Little Big Town
Barack Obama and Donald Trump Phone Call; Tonight Show Sidewalk of Fame; Stranger Strings (Little Big Town); The Muff of Truth (Andy Cohen); Little Big Town performed "Better Man"
571	November 15, 2016	Warren Beatty, Naomie Harris, Robbie Robertson	Aminé
US Senator Jobs; Tonight Show Polls; Aminé performed "Caroline"
572	November 16, 2016	Jude Law, Sterling K. Brown	Macklemore featuring Ariana DeBoo
Application For Employment; Jimmy Fallon, Metallica & The Roots sing "Enter Sandman" with classroom instruments; Tonight Show Kid Letters; Macklemore featuring Ariana DeBoo performed "Drug Dealer"
573	November 17, 2016	Nicole Kidman, Michael Shannon	Miranda Lambert
NFL Improvements; Tonight Show Superlatives; Tonight Show #hashtags: #MyFamilyIsWeird; Keith Urban makes an appearance; Tonight Show Jinx Challenge (Nicole Kidman, Keith Urban); Michael Shannon brings Jimmy clothing; Jimmy gives Michael Shannon a destroyed novel; Miranda Lambert performed "Vice"
574	November 18, 2016	Megyn Kelly, Chris Hardwick	Emeli Sandé
Jimmy invites audience member (Joe Biagini) back to re-do a failed high five; Jimmy plays Mario Kart with race car drivers; Thank You Notes; Megyn Kelly's birthday; Box of Lies (Megyn Kelly); Emeli Sandé performed "Hurts"
575	November 21, 2016	Jason Sudeikis, Kristin Chenoweth	DNCE
Donald Trump Tweets; Tonight Show Motivational Monday; Tonight Show Do Not Read; Tandem Sculptionary (Jason Sudeikis & Kristin Chenoweth Vs. Jimmy Fallon & Joe Jonas); Kristin Chenoweth performed "The Chipmunk Song (Christmas Don't Be Late)"; DNCE performed "Body Moves"
576	November 22, 2016	Sarah Jessica Parker, Scott Patterson, Liza Weil, Sean Gunn, Frank Pellegrino Jr.	N/A
Popular Times; Tonight Show Siri Reminders; Tonight Show Bad Signs
577	November 23, 2016	Leslie Mann, Jonathan Groff	Machine Gun Kelly & Camila Cabello
Thanksgiving Timeline; Tonight Show Superlatives; GE Tonight Show Fallonventions: Kid's Inventions; Leslie Mann gives Jimmy a coin to give to Harvey Keitel; Jimmy teaches Jonathan Groff a breathing technique; Machine Gun Kelly & Camila Cabello performed "Bad Things"
578	November 24, 2016	Kevin James, Tim Gunn	The Weeknd
Thank You Notes; Point Pleasant Police Department (Kevin James); The Weeknd performed "I Feel It Coming/Starboy"
579	November 28, 2016	John Goodman, Alexis Bledel	David Gray
Tonight Show This Week in Memes; Freestylin' with The Roots; David Gray performed "Babylon"
580	November 29, 2016	Natalie Portman, J. J. Abrams	Neil Diamond
Tonight Show Podcasts; Jimmy gives Natalie Portman an ornament; Password (Jimmy Fallon & Neil Diamond Vs. Natalie Portman & J. J. Abrams); Neil Diamond performed "Christmas Medley"
581	November 30, 2016	Felicity Jones, Billy Crudup	Car Seat Headrest
Betsy DeVos Phone Call; Tonight Show Superlatives; Tonight Show Audience Suggestion Box (Jimmy dresses up as Santa Claus and tackles a Christmas tree); Felicity Jones teaches Jimmy kung fu; Car Seat Headrest performed "Drunk Drivers/Killer Whales"

=== December ===
No.	Original release date	Guest(s)	Musical/entertainment guest(s)
582	December 1, 2016	Emma Stone, Jeffrey Dean Morgan	Kacey Musgraves
Tariq promotes his grill; Tonight Show #hashtags: #OfficePartyFail; Tonight Show Whisper Challenge (Emma Stone); Jeffrey Dean Morgan brings Jimmy a basket of candy; Kacey Musgraves performed "Present Without a Bow"
583	December 2, 2016	Chelsea Handler, John Legend	John Legend
Trump Tower Audio Book; Chuck Leavell sits in with The Roots; Thank You Notes; Charades (Jimmy Fallon & Chelsea Handler Vs. John Legend & Chrissy Teigen); John Legend performed "Penthouse Floor"
584	December 5, 2016	Annette Bening, Steve Harvey	The Hamilton Mixtape
Tonight Show Popular Mathematics; Tonight Show Family Feud (The Roots Vs. Jimmy Fallon & the cast of 20th Century Women); The Hamilton Mixtape performed "My Shot"
585	December 6, 2016	Chris Pratt, Katie Holmes	John Mayer
Tonight Show Screengrabs; Tonight Show Mad Lib Theater (Chris Pratt); John Mayer performed "Love on the Weekend"
586	December 7, 2016	Edward Norton, Riz Ahmed, Reggie Fils-Aimé	N/A
Holiday Edition: Tariq & Adler Podcast; Tonight Show Superlatives; Tonight Show Wheel of Freestyle (Riz Ahmed); Shigeru Miyamoto performed the Super Mario Bros. theme with The Roots; Nintendo of America CEO Reggie Fils-Aimé demonstrates the Nintendo Switch
587	December 8, 2016	Robert De Niro, Pharrell Williams	Pharrell Williams & Kim Burrell
Updated Books; Tom Petty makes an appearance; Tonight Show 12 Days of Christmas Sweaters; Tonight Show #hashtags: #TextFail; Pharrell Williams & Kim Burrell performed "I See a Victory"
588	December 9, 2016	Dwayne Johnson, Kevin Nealon	Gary Clark Jr.
DuckTales Opening Credits; Tonight Show 12 Days of Christmas Sweaters; Thank You Notes; Jimmy gives Dwayne Johnson rocks; Dwayne Johnson gives back to a show producer and army veteran; Gary Clark Jr. performed "Hold On"
589	December 12, 2016	Bryan Cranston, Hailee Steinfeld	OneRepublic
Tonight Show 12 Days of Christmas Sweaters; Cranst n' Cranst Out (Bryan Cranston); Canyon Confessions (Bryan Cranston); OneRepublic performed "Let's Hurt Tonight"
590	December 13, 2016	Michael Fassbender, Jon Glaser	Niall Horan
Gift Ideas; Tonight Show 12 Days of Christmas Sweaters; Tonight Show Superlatives; Tonight Show Air Guitar Battle (Michael Fassbender); Jon Glaser comes out in a relaxation hoodie and gives Jimmy a hoodie; Jon Glaser and Jimmy have a relaxing interview; Niall Horan performed "This Town"
591	December 14, 2016	Arnold Schwarzenegger, Elle Fanning	Childish Gambino
Tonight Show 12 Days of Christmas Sweaters; Tonight Show Do Not Play; Arnold Schwarzenegger explains his recent injury; Tonight Show Snapchat Interview (Arnold Schwarzenegger); Childish Gambino performed "Redbone"
592	December 15, 2016	Casey Affleck, Sienna Miller	Solange
Tonight Show Break from Political Jokes; Tonight Show 12 Days of Christmas Sweaters; Tonight Show #hashtags: #CrappyHolidays; Tonight Show Ramen Challenge (Sienna Miller); Solange performed "Rise/Weary"
593	December 16, 2016	Reese Witherspoon, Andrew Rannells	Warpaint
Tonight Show 12 Days of Christmas Sweaters; Tonight Show Stocking Stuffers; Thank You Notes; Jimmy gives Reese Witherspoon a present for her mother; Tonight Show Virtual Reality Pictionary (Jimmy Fallon & Andrew Rannells Vs. Steve Higgins & Michael Che); Warpaint performed "New Song"
594	December 19, 2016	Denzel Washington, Tony Bennett	Tony Bennett
Tonight Show 12 Days of Christmas Sweaters; Tonight Show Sidewalk of Fame; Tonight Show Greeting Card Monologues (Denzel Washington); Tony Bennett performed "I Left My Heart in San Francisco"
595	December 20, 2016	Matthew McConaughey, Janelle Monáe	Sylvan Esso
Jimmy, The Roots, the cast of Sing and Paul McCartney performed an A cappella rendition of "Wonderful Christmastime"; Tonight Show 12 Days of Christmas Sweaters; Kid Theater (Matthew McConaughey); Sylvan Esso performed "Radio"
596	December 21, 2016	Viola Davis, Nick Kroll, Chef Daniel Humm	Pentatonix
Donald Trump Audio Tapes; Tonight Show Break from Political Jokes; Marijuana User Quotes; Tonight Show 12 Days of Christmas Sweaters; Tonight Show Superlatives; Tonight Show Best Friends Challenge (Viola Davis); Pentatonix performed "The Christmas Sing Along".
597	December 22, 2016	Jim Parsons, Evan & Jillian	Dec 99th
Trump Winery Ad; Tonight Show I've Got Good News and Good News; Tonight Show 12 Days of Christmas Sweaters; Tonight Show #hashtags: #NewXmasCarols; Tonight Show 5–Second Summaries (Jim Parsons); Dec 99th performed "Seaside Panic Room/N.A.W. Medley"
598	December 23, 2016	Adam Driver, Rhett and Link	R. Kelly
Tariq interrupts the monologue; Tonight Show 12 Days of Christmas Sweaters; Thank You Notes; Will It Tea? (Rhett and Link); R. Kelly performed "Step in the Name of Love/Home for Christmas"
