= List of The Tonight Show Starring Jimmy Fallon episodes (2017) =

- No. of episodes: 198

Release
- Original network: NBC
- Original release: January 10 – December 22, 2017

Season chronology
- ← Previous; 2016 episodes Next → 2018 episodes

This is the list of episodes for The Tonight Show Starring Jimmy Fallon in 2017.

== 2017 ==
=== January ===
No.	Original release date	Guest(s)	Musical/entertainment guest(s)
599	January 10, 2017	Queen Latifah, Fred Armisen	The Flaming Lips
Questlove and Tariq re-enact a scene from The Bachelor; Tonight Show Behind the Lyrics (John Legend, Neil Diamond, Michael Bublé); Freestylin' with The Roots; Humannequins (Jimmy Fallon & Queen Latifah Vs. Fred Armisen & Wayne Coyne); The Flaming Lips performed "The Castle"
600	January 11, 2017	First Lady Michelle Obama	Stevie Wonder
Americans Thank the First Lady; Thank You Notes (Michelle Obama); Catchphrase (Michelle Obama & Jimmy Fallon Vs. Dave Chappelle & Jerry Seinfeld); Stevie Wonder performed "Isn't She Lovely/My Cherie Amour"
601	January 12, 2017	Kevin Bacon, Greta Gerwig	Nick Thune
Snapple Flavors; Jimmy announces a week of shows in Orlando (April 3–6); Tonight Show #hashtags: #ResolutionFail; First Drafts of Rock ("Lola"; Kevin Bacon)
602	January 13, 2017	Claire Danes, J. K. Simmons	Sampha
Trump's Limo; Jake Clemons sits in with The Roots; Thank You Notes; WTXP Local News 4 (Claire Danes, J. K. Simmons); Jimmy gives J. K. Simmons a USB drive with his YouTube clip; Sampha performed "No One Knows Me Like the Piano"
603	January 16, 2017	Michael Strahan, Bryce Dallas Howard	Bebe Rexha
Tonight Show Polls; Pyramid (Jimmy Fallon & Questlove Vs. Michael Strahan & Bryce Dallas Howard); Bebe Rexha performed "I Got You"
604	January 17, 2017	Michael Keaton, Nina Dobrev	The xx
Donald Trump Tweets; Bill Belichick Quote; Questlove and Tariq re-enact a scene from The Bachelor; Vladimir Putin Film Reviews; Tonight Show Superlatives; Tonight Show Rhyme–versation (Michael Keaton); The xx performed "Lips"
605	January 18, 2017	James McAvoy, Nick Offerman	Kings of Leon
Nick Valensi sits in with The Roots; Tonight Show Audience Suggestion Box (Hashtag the Panda makes an appearance, The Bachelor with British accents, Nick Offerman reads a poem, Hot Dad provides lyrics to the opening theme, Nellie "Tiger" Travis performed "Slap Your Weave Off"); Tonight Show Ramen Challenge (James McAvoy); Kings of Leon performed "Reverend"
606	January 19, 2017	Aziz Ansari, Carrie Brownstein	Panic! at the Disco
Donald Trump Speech Lines; Tonight Show #hashtags: #TimeToMove; Tonight Show Dramatic Yelp Reviews (Aziz Ansari); Panic! at the Disco performed "Death of a Bachelor"
607	January 20, 2017	James Spader, Big Sean, Kevin Delaney	Marian Hill
Pun Headlines; Trump Tower Resident Quotes; Questlove's birthday; Thank You Notes; Marian Hill performed "Down"
608	January 23, 2017	Cate Blanchett, Hugh Dancy	Cobi
Tariq & Adler Podcast; Tonight Show Do Not Read; Tonight Show Emotional Interview (Cate Blanchett); Cobi performed "Don't You Cry for Me"
609	January 24, 2017	Mike Myers, Tim Ferriss	Steve Aoki & Louis Tomlinson
Donald Trump Holiday Names; Questlove and Tariq re-enact a scene from The Bachelor; Tonight Show Behind the Lyrics (DNCE, Chris Stapleton, Hailee Steinfeld); Tonight Show Good Name Bad Name Great Name; Tonight Show Dice Dance Off (Mike Myers); Tim Ferriss spins Jimmy on his legs; Steve Aoki & Louis Tomlinson performed "Just Hold On"
610	January 25, 2017	Glenn Close, Jay Baruchel	Candice Thompson
Jimmy acknowledges death of Mary Tyler Moore; Tonight Show This Week in Memes; Tonight Show Kid Letters; Glenn Close and Jimmy blow thru cocktail straws; Horse-Drawn Carriage Race (Glenn Close)
611	January 26, 2017	Danny DeVito, Brit Marling, Ciro Ortiz	Jon Bellion
Tonight Show Two Truths & an Alternative Fact; Tonight Show #hashtags: #WorstLieIEverTold; Jimmy gives Ciro Ortiz a video game console; Jon Bellion performed "All Time Low"
612	January 27, 2017	Drew Barrymore, Tom Brokaw	Parquet Courts
Lindsey Graham Tweets; Tonight Show Common Ground; Thank You Notes; Drew Barrymore breaks Guinness World Records; Parquet Courts performed "Human Performance"
613	January 30, 2017	Ricky Gervais, Vanessa Hudgens	Noah Cyrus featuring Labrinth
Barack Obama Memoir Titles; Donald Trump Speech; Vanessa Hudgens and Jimmy performed "I'll Be There for You"; Noah Cyrus featuring Labrinth performed "Make Me (Cry)"
614	January 31, 2017	Dakota Johnson, Colin Hanks	UB40
Questlove and Tariq re-enact a scene from The Bachelor; Tonight Show Picture This; Tonight Show Mad Lib Theater (Dakota Johnson); UB40 performed "Red Red Wine"

=== February ===
No.	Original release date	Guest(s)	Musical/entertainment guest(s)
615	February 1, 2017	Keanu Reeves, Judd Apatow	The Lumineers
Supreme Court Nominee Quotes; Doug Whitman; Cat & Dog Quotes; Tonight Show Superlatives; Tonight Show Kid Standup (Keanu Reeves, Judd Apatow); The Lumineers performed "Angela"
616	February 2, 2017	Kristen Stewart, Dan Rather	Big Sean
Jimmy invites all audience members wearing plaid out on the floor; Tonight Show Puppy Predictors: Super Bowl LI Edition; Face Breakers (Tariq & Jimmy Fallon Vs. Kristen Stewart & Big Sean); Big Sean performed "Halfway Off the Balcony"
617	February 3, 2017	Gordon Ramsay, Alessia Cara, Ask This Old House	N/A
Thank You Notes; Jimmy brings out a swear jar for Gordon Ramsay; Secret Ingredient (Gordon Ramsay); Alessia Cara makes a wish; Tonight Show Wheel of Musical Impressions (Alessia Cara)
618	February 6, 2017	Super Bowl Champions Bill Belichick and Julian Edelman, Tom Selleck, Joe Jonas	Kelsea Ballerini
Inner Thoughts; Tonight Show Bad Signs; Joe Jonas brings Jimmy underwear; Kelsea Ballerini performed "Yeah Boy"
619	February 7, 2017	Ice Cube, Rosamund Pike	The Band Perry
White House Audio Tour; Freestylin' with The Roots; Random Object Shootout (Ice Cube, Blake Griffin); Say Anything (Rosamund Pike); The Band Perry performed "Stay in the Dark"
620	February 8, 2017	Seth Meyers, Dev Patel	Kid Cudi
Betsy DeVos Test Questions; Donald Trump's Favorite Cocktails; Tonight Show Common Ground; Tonight Show Audience Suggestion Box (Hashtags, Fifty Shades Darker trailer dubbed with Pee-wee Herman, Tonight Show writer performed "I Want You Back", Questlove and Tariq re-enact a scene from The Bachelor); Kid Cudi performed "Kitchen"; Seth Meyers and Jimmy walk upstairs to the Late Night set
621	February 9, 2017	Alec Baldwin, Joanna Garcia Swisher	Future Islands
Betsy DeVos Interview; Homeland Security Statement; Nathan East sits in with The Roots; Tonight Show #hashtags: #WhyImSingle; Jimmy promotes The Escape; Box of Lies (Alec Baldwin); Joanna Garcia Swisher pelts Jimmy with snowballs when she comes out; Future Islands performed "Ran"
622	February 10, 2017	Lena Dunham, Common	Kate Berlant & John Early
Candy Hearts; Head Swap (appearance by Joe Jonas); Thank You Notes; Lena Dunham brings out dogs; Lena Dunham reads a poem; Tonight Show Wheel of Freestyle (Common)
623	February 13, 2017	Magic Johnson, Luke Wilson	Roy Wood Jr.
Betsy DeVos Interview; Trump Administration Aliases; Arthur Meyer; Tonight Show Sidewalk of Fame; Roomba Pong (Magic Johnson & Jimmy Fallon Vs. Tariq & Luke Wilson)
624	February 14, 2017	Charlie Day, Kendall Jenner	NxWorries
James Spadge; Tonight Show Do Not Play; Charades (Charlie Day & Steve Higgins Vs. Kendall Jenner & Jimmy Fallon); Kendall Jenner and Jimmy take photos; NxWorries performed "What More Can I Say"
625	February 15, 2017	Gwen Stefani, Dane DeHaan, Damien Chazelle	Maggie Rogers
Tonight Show Podcasts; Maggie Rogers performed "Alaska"
626	February 16, 2017	Jessica Biel, Ricky Martin, Robert Irwin	Rag'n'Bone Man
Donald Trump Press Conference cold open; Chad Smith sits in with The Roots; Tonight Show #hashtags: #IGotCaught; exclusive debut of first trailer for The Sinner; Rag'n'Bone Man performed "Human"
627	February 17, 2017	Joel McHale, Zoë Kravitz	Ryan Adams
Michael Flynn Replacement Candidates; Trump Winery Commercial; Tonight Show This Week in Words; Thank You Notes; Tonight Show Popular Mathematics; Joel McHale gives his book to an audience member; Lenny Kravitz brings out drinks to celebrate the third anniversary of The Tonight Show Starring Jimmy Fallon; Ryan Adams performed "Do You Still Love Me?"
628	February 21, 2017	Will Forte, Milo Ventimiglia	Future
Donald Trump Speech (TNN); Brian Dunning (Will Forte); Milo Ventimiglia explains his broken arm; Future performed "Draco"
629	February 22, 2017	Neil Patrick Harris, Ken Jeong	Josh Johnson
Sean Spicer Press Briefing Moment; C-SPAN Advertisement; Tonight Show I've Got Good News and Good News; Tonight Show Two Truths & an Alternative Fact; Egg Russian Roulette (Neil Patrick Harris); So Jeong or So Wrong (Ken Jeong)
630	February 23, 2017	Susan Sarandon, Elijah Wood	Little Big Town
Dog Memes; Charlie Wilson sits in with The Roots; Tonight Show Sidewalk Cinema; Tonight Show #hashtags: #IfIWonThePowerball; Musical Beers (Susan Sarandon, Elijah Wood, Little Big Town); Little Big Town performed "Rollin'"
631	February 24, 2017	Hugh Jackman, Mandy Moore	Chronixx
Rosetta Stone: Trumpese; Donald Trump Film Reviews; Tonight Show This Week in Words; Thank You Notes; Jo Firestone shows toys from the toy fair; Tonight Show Whisper Challenge (Hugh Jackman); Mario Batali brings out pasta; Milo Ventimiglia's message for Mandy Moore; Chronixx performed "Majesty/Likes"
632	February 27, 2017	Aaron Paul, Keri Russell	2 Chainz featuring Gucci Mane
Jimmy Fallon, Ed Sheeran & The Roots sing "Shape of You" with classroom instruments; Password (Aaron Paul & Gucci Mane Vs. Keri Russell & 2 Chainz); Fallon Five (Keri Russell); 2 Chainz featuring Gucci Mane performed "Good Drank"
633	February 28, 2017	Michael Shannon, Alicia Keys	John Mellencamp featuring Martina McBride
Freestylin' with The Roots; Michael Shannon performed "Russians"; Tonight Show Wheel of Musical Impressions (Alicia Keys); John Mellencamp featuring Martina McBride performed "Grandview"

=== March ===
No.	Original release date	Guest(s)	Musical/entertainment guest(s)
634	March 1, 2017	Jennifer Lopez, Jeff Probst	Depeche Mode
TNN; Epilogues; Tonight Show Polls; Tonight Show Dance Battle (Jennifer Lopez); Depeche Mode performed "Where's the Revolution"
635	March 2, 2017	Octavia Spencer, John Lithgow	Luke Bryan
Jeff Sessions Career Options; Trump Hotel Commercial; Tonight Show #hashtags: #IveChanged; Catchphrase (Octavia Spencer & John Lithgow Vs. Jimmy Fallon & Luke Bryan); Two Truths and a Lie (John Lithgow); John Lithgow gives Jimmy a painting; Luke Bryan performed "Fast"
636	March 3, 2017	Samuel L. Jackson, Dakota Fanning	Ed Sheeran
The Shack trailer voice-over by Shaq; Tonight Show This Week in Words; Thank You Notes; Tonight Show Facebook Rants (Samuel L. Jackson); Jimmy gives Dakota Fanning a birthday present; Ed Sheeran performed "Shape of You"
637	March 13, 2017	Kiefer Sutherland, Priyanka Chopra	Rebel and a Basketcase with Evan Rachel Wood
Jimmy is interrupted during the monologue; Secret Service Quotes; Luke Bryan can't say "Gyro" (Luke Bryan and Jimmy performed the song "I Don't Know How to Pronounce Gyro"); Tandem Sculptionary (Priyanka Chopra, Rebel and a Basketcase); Priyanka Chopra and Jimmy celebrate Holi; Rebel and a Basketcase performed "Today"
638	March 14, 2017	Adam Levine, Josh Gad	Maroon 5
Chris Sununu Quotes; Questlove, Tariq and Mark re-enact a scene from The Bachelor; Tonight Show Do Not Play; Adam Levine brings alcohol; Tonight Show Box of Microphones (Josh Gad); Maroon 5 performed "Cold"
639	March 15, 2017	Ice Cube, Rachel Maddow	Khalid
Donald Trump Tax Return; Tonight Show Audience Suggestion Box (The Bachelor voiced-over by Donald Trump, Tommy Campbell plays drums, Shaq Bracket, Michael Buffer makes an appearance, Techno remix of Al Roker, Ice Cube reads an affirmation); Khalid performed "Location"
640	March 16, 2017	Elizabeth Banks, J. J. Abrams	Kae Tempest
Jimmy gives shout-out to pandas on National Panda Day and dances with Hashtag the Panda; Jimmy congratulates Questlove on his James Beard Award nomination; Tonight Show #hashtags: #MarchDadness; Elizabeth Banks reads questions from her sons to Jimmy; Tonight Show Emotional Interview (Elizabeth Banks); Jimmy brings out the writers of The Play That Goes Wrong; Kae Tempest performed "Europe Is Lost"
641	March 17, 2017	Taraji P. Henson, Jon Glaser	Run the Jewels
Trump Administration St. Patrick's Day Activities; The Roots wish everyone Happy St. Patrick's Day with Irish accents; Tonight Show This Week in Words; Thank You Notes; Drinko (Taraji P. Henson); Jon Glaser lip sings a Pitbull song; Run the Jewels performed "Legend Has It"; Note: Pitbull was scheduled; however, due to a flight delay he was unable to make it on time and Jon Glaser was interviewed.
642	March 20, 2017	Jake Gyllenhaal, Paris Jackson	Julia Michaels
Donald Trump Notes; Trump Stump Commercial; Contractor Quotes; Tariq & Adler Podcast; Jake Gyllenhaal draws Questlove; Fallon Firsts (Paris Jackson); Egg Russian Roulette (Paris Jackson); Julia Michaels performed "Issues"
643	March 21, 2017	Jessica Chastain, Joe Manganiello	Gary Clark Jr.
Prodigy sits in with The Roots; Girl Scout Katie Francis sells record-breaking cookies to Jimmy, and Jimmy gives her a check for $15,000; Tonight Show Do Not Read; Charades (Jessica Chastain & Jimmy Fallon Vs. Tariq & Joe Manganiello); Joe Manganiello does impressions; Gary Clark Jr. performed "Our Love"
644	March 22, 2017	Woody Harrelson, John Cena	Martin Garrix & Dua Lipa
Shaq Bracket; Jimmy hires a new intern; Tonight Show Good Name Bad Name Great Name; John Cena gives Jimmy a t-shirt; Tonight Show Whisper Challenge (John Cena); Martin Garrix & Dua Lipa performed "Scared to Be Lonely"
645	March 23, 2017	Anthony Anderson, Rhett and Link	Migos
Jimmy Fallon, Migos & The Roots sing "Bad and Boujee" with office supplies; Anthony Anderson performed "Me and Mrs. Jones"; debut of Rhett and Link's book cover; Will It S'more? (Rhett and Link); Migos performed "T-Shirt"
646	March 24, 2017	Morgan Freeman, Norman Reedus	Joe Zimmerman
Congressmen / women Quotes; Tonight Show This Week in Words; Thank You Notes; Intense Staredown (Norman Reedus)
647	March 27, 2017	Scarlett Johansson, Richard Dreyfuss	Dan White
Donald Trump Book Titles; Donald Trump Schedule; Ew! sketch (Demi Lovato); Tonight Show Virtual Reality Pictionary (Scarlett Johansson & Michael Che Vs. Jimmy Fallon & Dove Cameron); Dan White does magic for Scarlett Johansson; Jimmy asks Richard Dreyfuss a question about Jaws
648	March 28, 2017	Jason Segel, Lilly Singh	Brian Regan
Things Polling Higher Than Donald Trump; The Blame Game Commercial; Tonight Show Kid Art; Tonight Show Battle of the Instant Songwriters; The Jinx Challenge (Lilly Singh)
649	March 29, 2017	Katie Holmes, Andrew Rannells	Zac Brown Band
Crayola Colors; Tonight Show Screengrabs; Puppy Predictors: 2017 Final Four Edition; Tonight Show Pup Quiz (Katie Holmes, Andrew Rannells); Zac Brown Band performed "My Old Man"
650	March 30, 2017	Louis C.K., Regina King	Tinashe
White House Website; Shaq Bracket; Tonight Show #hashtags: #SpringBroke; Tinashe performed "Flame"

=== April ===
No.	Original release date	Guest(s)	Musical/entertainment guest(s)
651	April 3, 2017	Vin Diesel, Shaquille O'Neal	Pitbull featuring Stephen Marley
From Universal Orlando: Trip to Orlando cold open; Single Rider Quotes; Grape to the Cork; Tonight Show I've Got Good News and Good News; Vin Diesel sings karaoke; Lip Sync Battle (Shaquille O'Neal, appearance by Pitbull); Pitbull featuring Stephen Marley performed "Options"
652	April 4, 2017	Blake Shelton, Scott Eastwood	Blake Shelton
From Universal Orlando: Universal Orlando Commercial; Resident Quotes; Tonight Show Florida News Roulette; Tonight Show Mom & Pop Quiz: Orlando Edition; Jimmy and Blake Ride Race Through New York; The Ragtime Gals performed Sir Mix-a-Lot songs; Blake Shelton performed "Every Time I Hear That Song"
653	April 5, 2017	Dwayne Johnson, Nicole Richie	Flo Rida and 99 Percent
From Universal Orlando: Donald Trump Video; Race Through Universal Starring Dwayne and Jimmy; Tonight Show Celebrity Photobomb (Dwayne Johnson); Phone Booth (Dwayne Johnson); Flo Rida and 99 Percent performed "Cake"
654	April 6, 2017	Jay Leno, Kate Upton	Jason Derulo featuring Ty Dolla Sign
From Universal Orlando: Rider Memes; Tonight Show This Week in Words; Jay Leno subs in for Jimmy during monologue; Jimmy acknowledges death of Don Rickles; Thank You Notes; Tonight Show Dance Battle (Kate Upton); Jason Derulo featuring Ty Dolla Sign performed "Swalla"
655	April 17, 2017	Anne Hathaway, Tony Hale	Ed Sheeran
Presidents Celebrating Easter; Freestylin' with The Roots; Tonight Show Google Translate Songs (Anne Hathaway); Ed Sheeran performed "Castle on the Hill"
656	April 18, 2017	Kevin Spacey, Senator Elizabeth Warren	Alt-J
Donald Trump Limericks; Eli Manning Commercial; Tonight Show Picture This; José Quintana teaches Jimmy Spanish; Kevin Spacey announces his new play; Tonight Show Mad Lib Theater (Kevin Spacey, appearance by John McEnroe); Alt-J performed "In Cold Blood"
657	April 19, 2017	Sienna Miller, Anthony Bourdain	Chris Cornell
Betsy DeVos Snapchat Video; Fear Factor Challenges; Tonight Show This Week in Memes; Secret Ingredient (Sienna Miller, Anthony Bourdain); Chris Cornell performed "The Promise"
658	April 20, 2017	Bob Odenkirk, Lucy Hale, Robert Irwin	Brad Paisley
Tonight Show #hashtags: #420Songs (appearance by Brad Paisley); Bob Odenkirk receives a phone call during the interview; Brad Paisley performed "Contact High"
659	April 21, 2017	Salma Hayek, Mike Birbiglia	Clean Bandit & Zara Larsson
Thank You Notes; Salma Hayek turns a sad song into a salsa; Tonight Show Ramen Challenge (Salma Hayek); Clean Bandit & Zara Larsson performed "Symphony"
660	April 24, 2017	Kobe Bryant, Kathryn Hahn	Big Boi
Trump Science Dictionary Definitions; Donald Trump Tweets; Tonight Show Podcasts; Kobe Bryant performs Family Matters poem; Max Bonnstetter asks Kobe Bryant questions; Big Boi performed "Mic Jack"
661	April 25, 2017	John Oliver, Patton Oswalt	James Arthur
Barack Obama Interview; Tonight Show Pros & Cons: Trump's First 100 Days; Tonight Showbotics; James Arthur performed "Say You Won't Let Go"
662	April 26, 2017	Dr. Phil, Leslie Jones	Rick Ross featuring Young Thug & Wale
Countries List; Faceapp; Seth Rogen voiced-over The Lion King; Take Your Kids to Work Day; Tonight Show Bad Signs; Two Truths and a Lie (Dr. Phil); Truth or Lie (Leslie Jones); Rick Ross featuring Young Thug & Wale performed "Trap Trap Trap"
663	April 27, 2017	Emma Watson, W. Kamau Bell, Little Big Shots Pizza Tossing Brothers	The Lucas Brothers
Donald Trump Reminders; NAFTA Leaders; Steve Mnuchin Quotes; Senate Quotes; Tonight Show #hashtags: #MyWeirdDentist
664	April 28, 2017	Martin Short, Britt Robertson, Jessica Seinfeld	N/A
Donald Trump Video; Tonight Show This Week in Words: First 100 Days Edition; Jiminy Glick Interviews Trump on His First 100 Days (Martin Short); Thank You Notes

=== May ===
No.	Original release date	Guest(s)	Musical/entertainment guest(s)
665	May 1, 2017	Goldie Hawn, Nikolaj Coster-Waldau, Brian Reed	Mary J. Blige
White House Visitor Questions; Tonight Show Kid Letters; Mary J. Blige performed "Love Yourself"
666	May 2, 2017	Chris Rock, Andy Cohen	Phoenix
Donald Trump Definitions; Tonight Show Pros & Cons: Donald Trump Returning to NYC; Tonight Show Do Not Play; Andy Cohen and Jimmy have sloppy unicorns; Phoenix performed "J-Boy"
667	May 3, 2017	Kaley Cuoco, Horatio Sanz	LP
Vladimir Putin Film Reviews; Survivor: Trump Family Edition Commercial; Salt Lake City Commercial; Tonight Show Popular Mathematics; Tonight Show Audience Suggestion Box (Star Wars characters singing "All Star", Tariq's margaritas; Jimmy tells knock knock jokes (Spandau Ballet members in the audience)); Kaley Cuoco and Jimmy take audience questions (Kaley Cuoco performed The Big Bang Theory theme); Jimmy gives Horatio Sanz glasses; LP performed "Lost on You"
668	May 4, 2017	Chris Pine, Fran Lebowitz	Halsey
Arthur Meyer; Joey DeFrancesco sits in with The Roots; tuba players performed Star Wars music; Tonight Show #hashtags: #PromFail; Slapjack (Chris Pine); Halsey performed "Now or Never"
669	May 5, 2017	Paul Giamatti, Gisele Bündchen	Pete Lee
Horse Quotes; Politicians Trying to Speak Spanish; Hashtag the Panda; Famous Art; Tonight Show Puppy Predictors: 2017 Kentucky Derby Edition; Thank You Notes; Paul Giamatti and Jimmy have mint juleps and predict the Kentucky Derby; Tonight Show Pup Quiz (Gisele Bündchen)
670	May 8, 2017	Kevin Bacon, David Feherty	Chris Stapleton
Donald Trump Medical Definitions; Tonight Show Polls; First Drafts of Rock (Kevin Bacon, Chris Stapleton); David Feherty brings Jimmy a golf club cover; Chris Stapleton performed "I Was Wrong"
671	May 9, 2017	Aziz Ansari, Katherine Waterston	Blondie
Bill Clinton Novel Titles; Shaq 911 Calls; Jimmy brings teachers on stage to celebrate National Teacher Day; Tonight Show Pros & Cons: Trumpcare; Tonight Show Dramatic Yelp Reviews (Aziz Ansari); Blondie performed "Long Time"
672	May 10, 2017	Tina Fey, Alessandro Nivola	Dirty Projectors featuring D∆WN
Trump Cover Up Commercial; Weed Slogans; Tonight Show Do Not Read; The Ragtime Gals performed Bruno Mars songs (with Tina Fey); Tonight Show Best Friends Challenge (Tina Fey); Dirty Projectors featuring D∆WN performed "Cool Your Heart"
673	May 11, 2017	Michelle Pfeiffer, Kyle MacLachlan	Mark Normand
Donald Trump Firing List; Tonight Show #hashtags: #MomQuotes; Password (Michelle Pfeiffer & Jimmy Fallon Vs. Kyle MacLachlan & Tariq); Emoji Game (Kyle MacLachlan)
674	May 12, 2017	Derek Jeter, Katherine Langford	Father John Misty
Trump Administration Secrets; Tonight Show This Week in Words; Tonight Show Mom Talk; Thank You Notes; Father John Misty performed "Total Entertainment Forever"
675	May 15, 2017	Michael Fassbender, Jeffrey Tambor	Weezer
Jeffrey Tambor announces at the top of the show; Donald Trump Film Picks; Todd Rundgren sits in with The Roots; Aaron Judge interviews New Yorkers; Tonight Show Battle of the Instant Songwriters; Michael Fassbender plays with the band while being interviewed; Weezer performed "Feels Like Summer"
676	May 16, 2017	Matthew Perry, Jon Glaser	Fall Out Boy
Alan Siegel; Miley Cyrus makes a surprise appearance during the monologue; Tonight Show Pros & Cons: Working at the White House; Tonight Show Musicality; Jon Glaser comes out in a cowboy outfit; Fall Out Boy performed "Young and Menace"
677	May 17, 2017	Kerry Washington, Tim Tebow	David Crosby
Subway Buttons; Who's Getting Fired? Trailer; Hashtag the Panda is Miley Cyrus; Brendon Urie sits in with The Roots; Tonight Show Whisper Challenge (Kerry Washington); Tim Tebow dances with audience member; David Crosby performed "She's Got to Be Somewhere"
678	May 18, 2017	Dwayne Johnson, Ellie Kemper	Charlie Puth
Donald Trump Definitions; Tonight Show #hashtags: #MyWeirdSecret; Tonight Show Blow Your Mind (Dwayne Johnson); Charlie Puth performed "Attention"
679	May 19, 2017	Katy Perry, Josh Charles	Al Madrigal
Thank You Notes; Josh Charles teleports
680	May 22, 2017	Chelsea Handler, Mo Rocca	Cheat Codes featuring Demi Lovato
Tonight Show Audience Suggestion Box (Tonight Show writer re-creates Mamma Mia! music video, Melvin Maxwell, DuckTales / Hall & Oates mash-up, Black Simon & Garfunkel); Tonight Show Random People Random Questions (Chelsea Handler); Cheat Codes featuring Demi Lovato performed "No Promises"
681	May 23, 2017	Gal Gadot, Barry Manilow	Barry Manilow
Donald Trump Video; Questlove and Tariq re-enact a scene from The Bachelorette; Jimmy acknowledges the Manchester Arena bombing; Tonight Show Pros & Cons: The New Season of The Bachelorette; Box of Lies (Gal Gadot); Jimmy interviews Barry Manilow behind a piano; Barry Manilow performed "This Is My Town"
682	May 24, 2017	Orlando Bloom, Zoe Lister-Jones	Mike Vecchione
Photo Breakdown; Tonight Show Good Name Bad Name Great Name; Tonight Show Virtual Reality Pictionary (Orlando Bloom & Tariq Vs. Jimmy Fallon & Zoe Lister-Jones); Zoe Lister-Jones does an impression of a baby crying; Zoe Lister-Jones and Jimmy wear pizza holders
683	May 25, 2017	Jamie Foxx, Niall Horan	Niall Horan
Donald Trump Quotes; Jimmy does the "Gangnam Style" dance (appearance by Niall Horan); Logo Lawsuits; Tonight Show #hashtags: #MyWorstDate; Tonight Show Musical Genre Challenge (Jamie Foxx); Niall Horan performed "Slow Hands"
684	May 26, 2017	Jordan Peele, Claire Foy	Iggy Azalea featuring Anitta
Service men and women in the audience; Andrew Karn; Tonight Show This Week in Words; Thank You Notes; Freestylin' with The Roots; Iggy Azalea featuring Anitta performed "Switch"

=== June ===
No.	Original release date	Guest(s)	Musical/entertainment guest(s)
685	June 5, 2017	John Lithgow, Riley Keough, Giles Martin	Thundercat featuring Michael McDonald & Kenny Loggins
Football Term Meanings; Wonders of the Sea Trailer; Thundercat featuring Michael McDonald & Kenny Loggins performed "Show You the Way"
686	June 6, 2017	Tom Cruise, Kate Mara	Bleachers
Questlove and Tariq re-enact a scene from The Bachelorette; Mike McCready sits in with The Roots; Tonight Show Pros & Cons: Trump Pulling Out of the Paris Agreement; Tom Cruise invites audience to The Mummy premiere; Tonight Show Kid Theater (Tom Cruise); Bleachers performed "Don't Take the Money"
687	June 7, 2017	Norm Macdonald, Chelsea Clinton, Robert Irwin	Rae Sremmurd
Donald Trump Weather Report; Mike Pence Facebook Wall Messages; Tonight Show This Week in Memes; Norm Macdonald brings a book he's working on; Rae Sremmurd performed "Swang"
688	June 8, 2017	Will Arnett, Courtney B. Vance, Laurie Metcalf	Buckingham McVie
Sterling K. Brown Quotes; Shaqlights; Tonight Show Superlatives; Tonight Show #hashtags: #MyWorstSummerJob; Will Arnett speaks French; Tonight Show Word Sneak (Will Arnett); Buckingham McVie performed "In My World"
689	June 9, 2017	Kate McKinnon, John Cena	Mac DeMarco
Wikipedia Article Changes; Donald Trump Video; The Mummy Trailer; Tonight Show This Week in Words; Thank You Notes; Tonight Show True Confessions (John Cena, Kate McKinnon); John Cena dead-lifts Jimmy; Mac DeMarco performed "One More Love Song"
690	June 12, 2017	Demi Moore, Demetrius Shipp Jr.	Nathaniel Rateliff, Charles Berry Jr. & Charles Berry III
The Roots give tips on how to beat the heat; Jimmy Fallon, Buckingham McVie & kids sing "Don't Stop" with classroom instruments; Charades (Demi Moore & Jimmy Fallon Vs. Demetrius Shipp Jr. & Leslie Jones); Demi Moore and Jimmy suck on helium balloons; Nathaniel Rateliff, Charles Berry Jr. & Charles Berry III performed "Big Boys"
691	June 13, 2017	Mark Wahlberg, Heidi Klum	Lady Antebellum
White House Tape; Tonight Show Pros & Cons: The New York City Heat Wave; Tonight Show Dance Battle (Heidi Klum); Lady Antebellum performed "Heart Break"
692	June 14, 2017	Miley Cyrus	Miley Cyrus
Miley Cyrus appears in the opening; Miley Cyrus is Hashtag the Panda; Donald Trump Birthday Cards; Miley Cyrus and Jimmy go under disguise in the subway; Tonight Show Google Translate Songs (Miley Cyrus); Miley Cyrus performed "Malibu/Inspired"
693	June 15, 2017	Ethan Hawke, Lorde, Allan Peterkin & Russell Cordeiro	Lorde
Donald Trump Video; TV Network Slogans; Lil Yachty Raps About 59 Simpsons Characters; Tonight Show #hashtags: #DadQuotes; Ethan Hawke gives Jimmy a Training Day crew shirt; Jimmy gets his mustache; Lorde performed "Perfect Places"
694	June 16, 2017	Kirsten Dunst, Larry the Cable Guy	Nikki Glaser
Young Sopranos Clip; Tonight Show Dad Talk; Tonight Show Podcasts; Thank You Notes
695	June 19, 2017	Will Ferrell, Alison Brie	Shawn Mendes
Tonight Show Screengrabs; Will Ferrell comes out with a fake mustache and gives it to an audience member; Will Ferrell shows Jimmy his new reading glasses; Tonight Show Think Fast! (Will Ferrell); Shawn Mendes performed "There's Nothing Holdin' Me Back"
696	June 20, 2017	Amy Poehler, Zendaya	Imagine Dragons
White House Message; Dweezil Zappa sits in with The Roots; Tonight Show Pros & Cons: Trump Being Investigated; Tonight Show Are You Smarter Than a Smart Girl? (Amy Poehler); Will Ferrell has a question for Amy; Zendaya and Jimmy take videos; Imagine Dragons performed "Thunder"
697	June 21, 2017	Ashton Kutcher, Mario Batali	Liam Payne
Senator Quotes; Hasbro Ad; Jimmy announces his new picture book; Tonight Show Popular Mathematics; Secret Ingredient (Ashton Kutcher, Liam Payne, Vanessa Hudgens); Liam Payne performed "Strip That Down"
698	June 22, 2017	Ray Romano, Ruth Negga	Camila Cabello
The Wall Street Journal Research; Tonight Show #hashtags: #SummerSongs (with Camila Cabello); Camila Cabello performed "Crying in the Club"
699	June 23, 2017	Keanu Reeves, Cat Deeley	Ali Kolbert
Thank You Notes; Tonight Show Whisper Challenge (Keanu Reeves); Jimmy changes Ali Kolbert's Tonight Show intern note
700	June 26, 2017	Pharrell Williams, Chris Colfer	Vince Staples
Steve Mnuchin Wedding Vows; Congressmen Quotes; Harry Potter Characters Then and Now; Tonight Show Polls; Tonight Show Name That Song Challenge (Pharrell Williams); Chris Colfer draws an alien; Vince Staples performed "Love Can Be..."
701	June 27, 2017	Steve Carell, Lily Collins	Sheryl Crow
Product Ad; Tonight Show Pros & Cons: Getting a Summer Job; Tonight Show Blow Your Mind (Steve Carell); Sheryl Crow performed "Halfway There"
702	June 28, 2017	Kristen Wiig, Paul Dano	Macklemore featuring Skylar Grey
Donald Trump Magazine Covers; Typical Beef Tree; Steve Carell asks Kristen Wiig a question; Kristen Wiig does excursion noises; Tonight Show Mad Lib Theater (Kristen Wiig); Paul Dano stretches Jimmy out; Macklemore featuring Skylar Grey performed "Glorious"
703	June 29, 2017	Alex Rodriguez, Nick Kroll	HAIM
Reminders; Freestylin' with The Roots; Egg Russian Roulette (Alex Rodriguez); Nick Kroll and Jimmy roller-skate; HAIM performed "Want You Back"
704	June 30, 2017	Alec Baldwin, Julie Andrews	Dan White
Tonight Show This Week in Words; Thank You Notes; Alec and Jimmy wear sunglasses

=== July ===
No.	Original release date	Guest(s)	Musical/entertainment guest(s)
705	July 17, 2017	Queen Latifah, Kyle Mooney	Portugal. The Man
Emoji Inspirations; Street Vendor Signs; Tonight Show Sidewalk Cinema; Tonight Show Do Not Play; Kyle Mooney does karaoke; Portugal. The Man performed "Feel It Still"
706	July 18, 2017	Jada Pinkett Smith, Dane DeHaan	Rita Ora
Andrew Karn; Homeowner Quotes; Dave Davies sits in with The Roots; Tonight Show Pros & Cons: Trump's First Six Months in Office; Catchphrase (Jada Pinkett Smith & Jimmy Fallon Vs. Dane DeHaan & Rita Ora); Rita Ora performed "Your Song"
707	July 19, 2017	Harry Styles, Jenny Slate	The Who
Backup Plans; Donald Trump Weather Report; Tonight Show Good Name Bad Name Great Name; Harry Styles makes a wish; The Who performed "I Can See for Miles"
708	July 20, 2017	Charlize Theron, Michael Phelps, Julie Klam	SZA
Alibi Quotes; Tonight Show #hashtags: #MyFamilyIsWeird; Tonight Show Dance Battle (Charlize Theron); SZA performed "Love Galore"
709	July 21, 2017	Kevin Bacon, Jenna Dewan Tatum	Nate Bargatze
Thank You Notes; First Drafts of Rock (Kevin Bacon, Kyra Sedgwick); Kevin Bacon and Jimmy have sandwiches with audience member; Jenna Dewan Tatum shows Jimmy a dance move
710	July 24, 2017	Rob Lowe, Chrissy Metz	Fifth Harmony featuring Gucci Mane
New Jobs for Spicer; Donald Trump Sports Camp; New Tinder Features; Tonight Show Bad Signs; Tonight Show Best Son Challenge (Rob Lowe); Fifth Harmony featuring Gucci Mane performed "Down"
711	July 25, 2017	Jessica Biel, Matt Bomer	Kelsea Ballerini
World of Dad Dance; Keith Sweat sits in with The Roots; Tonight Show Pros & Cons: Replacing Sean Spicer; Charades (Jimmy Fallon & Jessica Biel Vs. Matt Bomer & Kelsea Ballerini); Matt Bomer raps; Kelsea Ballerini performed "Legends"
712	July 26, 2017	John Boyega, Rhett and Link	Kygo & Ellie Goulding
Patti Harrison; Tonight Show This Week in Memes; Will It Hot Dog? (Rhett and Link); Kygo & Ellie Goulding performed "First Time"
713	July 27, 2017	Michael Strahan, Jill Kargman	Slayer
Donald Trump Letter; Tonight Show #hashtags: #TextFail; Drinko (Michael Strahan); Michael Strahan performed "Can You Stand the Rain"; Slayer performed "Raining Blood"
714	July 28, 2017	David Spade, Desus & Mero	Penn & Teller
Donald Trump Album; Recipes; Tonight Show I've Got Good News and Good News; Thank You Notes
715	July 31, 2017	Idris Elba, Ali Wentworth	Tame Impala
John Early; Tonight Show Picture This; Tonight Show Google Translate Songs (Idris Elba); Tame Impala performed "Love/Paranoia"

=== August ===
No.	Original release date	Guest(s)	Musical/entertainment guest(s)
716	August 1, 2017	Jeremy Renner, Bridget Everett	French Montana featuring Swae Lee
KickedOut Commercial; White House Communications Directors; The White House: The Men Tell All; Tonight Show Pros & Cons: Getting Fired by Trump; Tonight Show Blow Your Mind (Jeremy Renner); Bridget Everett does karaoke; French Montana featuring Swae Lee performed "Unforgettable"
717	August 2, 2017	Halle Berry, Michael Che	George Ezra
Donald Trump Video; This Old Dump; Frozen Musical Trailer; Tonight Show Look 'a Likes; Box of Lies (Halle Berry); Michael Che writes a check for Tommy Hilfiger; Michael Che and Jimmy have champagne; George Ezra performed "Don't Matter Now"
718	August 3, 2017	Ice Cube, Ryan Seacrest	Action Bronson
Ice Cube Response Video; Tonight Show Superlatives; Tonight Show #hashtags: #FootballRaps; Tonight Show Battle of the Instant Songwriters; Jimmy gives Ryan Seacrest socks; Jimmy tries anti-aging cream; Action Bronson performed "The Chairman's Intent"
719	August 4, 2017	Jessica Alba, Tim Gunn, Andy Puddicombe	Louis Tomlinson featuring Bebe Rexha & Digital Farm Animals
Tonight Show This Week in Words; Thank You Notes (Rudy from Sesame Street does Thank You Notes); Jimmy pitches ideas to Jessica Alba; Louis Tomlinson featuring Bebe Rexha & Digital Farm Animals performed "Back to You"
720	August 7, 2017	Jeff Bridges, Aubrey Plaza	The Roots & Bilal
Tonight Show Polls; Tonight Show Think Fast (Aubrey Plaza); The Roots & Bilal performed "It Ain't Fair"
721	August 8, 2017	Billy Crystal, Derek Hough & World of Dance Winners	Jessie Reyez
The Bachelor Ad; New Jersey Slogans; Tonight Show Pros & Cons: Using Airbnb; Camp Winnipesaukee (Justin Timberlake, Billy Crystal, Keegan-Michael Key); Derek Hough and Jimmy dance; Jessie Reyez performed "Figures"
722	August 9, 2017	Brie Larson, Marlon Wayans	Brett Eldredge
Freestylin' with The Roots; Tonight Show Virtual Reality Pictionary (Brie Larson & Jimmy Fallon Vs. Tariq & Marlon Wayans); Brett Eldredge performed "The Long Way"
723	August 10, 2017	Anthony Anderson, Terry Gross	Kesha
Lego Products; Anthony Anderson and Terry Gross want Jimmy to sing "Despacito"; Tonight Show #hashtags: #MyCrayVacay; Password (Kesha & Jimmy Fallon Vs. Anthony Anderson & Terry Gross); Kesha performed "Praying"
724	August 11, 2017	Naomi Watts, Andy Cohen	Jo Koy
Company Ads; Tariq & Adler Podcast; Thank You Notes; Naomi Watts does a dance move; Jimmy brings Andy Cohen snacks; Tonight Show 5–Second Summaries (Andy Cohen)
725	August 14, 2017	Susan Sarandon, Riz Ahmed	Chord Overstreet
Jimmy acknowledges the Unite the Right rally at the top of the program; Riz Ahmed did a stand-up performance; Chord Overstreet performed "Hold On"
726	August 15, 2017	Keegan-Michael Key, Leslie Jones	A$AP Mob
Statues; Russian Apps; Tonight Show Pros & Cons: Watching the Solar Eclipse; Tonight Show True Confessions (Keegan-Michael Key, Leslie Jones); A$AP Mob performed "Feels So Good"
727	August 16, 2017	Katie Holmes, Marc Maron	Shania Twain
Tonight Show Say What We Want; Trump Winery Commercial; Common sits in with The Roots; Tonight Show Do Not Read; Tonight Show Pop Culture (Katie Holmes); Shania Twain performed "Swingin' with My Eyes Closed"
728	August 17, 2017	Rami Malek, Kathryn Hahn	Meek Mill featuring The-Dream
Greg Pence Campaign Slogans; Tonight Show #hashtags: #WhyIQuit; Tonight Show Audience Suggestion Box (An Inconvenient Sequel: Truth to Power trailer, racing rematch, Wolfgang Amadeus Mozart in the audience, Honey Bee double dutch team); Meek Mill featuring The-Dream performed "Young Black America"
729	August 18, 2017	Jon Hamm, Kate Upton, Grant Thompson	N/A
Thank You Notes (appearance by Triple H); Tonight Show Face It Challenge (Jon Hamm)

=== September ===
No.	Original release date	Guest(s)	Musical/entertainment guest(s)
730	September 5, 2017	Sarah Paulson, Tig Notaro	Luis Fonsi
Houston Gospel Choir performed "Lean on Me" in support of Hurricane Harvey victims at top of the program; Tonight Show Wheel of Impressions (Sarah Paulson); Tig Notaro does party bits; Luis Fonsi performed "Despacito"
731	September 6, 2017	Seth MacFarlane, Elisabeth Moss	Thomas Rhett
Nigel Duffy; Tonight Show Pros & Cons: The End of Summer 2017; GE Tonight Show Fallonventions: Kid's Inventions; Thomas Rhett performed "Unforgettable"
732	September 7, 2017	Reese Witherspoon	U2
Tonight Show Superlatives; Tonight Show Touchdown Dances; Tonight Show Cooler Heads; U2 performed "Bullet the Blue Sky" and "You're the Best Thing About Me"
733	September 8, 2017	James Franco, Kendall Jenner	Pete Townshend and Alfie Boe
Dr. Seuss Books; Thank You Notes; Tonight Show Pup Quiz (James Franco, Kendall Jenner); Kendall Jenner reads from speech; Pete Townshend and Alfie Boe performed "Love, Reign o'er Me"
734	September 11, 2017	Seth Meyers, Russell Westbrook	Prophets of Rage
Miss Backup Ohio; Tonight Show Popular Mathematics; Russell Westbrook and Jimmy play a video game; Prophets of Rage performed "Living on the 110"; Jimmy and Seth walk upstairs to the Late Night with Seth Meyers set
735	September 12, 2017	Jennifer Lawrence, Pedro Pascal	Patti Smith
Blurbs; Herb Alpert sits in with The Roots; Tonight Show Pros & Cons: The New iPhone; Axe Throwing Contest (Jennifer Lawrence); Pedro Pascal uses a whip; Patti Smith performed "People Have the Power"
736	September 13, 2017	Julianne Moore, Shawn Mendes	Maren Morris
Tonight Show Screengrabs; Spike Jonze shoots a live film in the studio; Maren Morris performed "Rich"
737	September 14, 2017	Jake Gyllenhaal, Dr. Jane Goodall	Yo Gotti featuring Nicki Minaj
Julio Torres; Tonight Show #hashtags: #MyWeirdRoomate; Jeff Bauman sits in the audience; Brainstorm (Jake Gyllenhaal); Yo Gotti featuring Nicki Minaj performed "Rake It Up"
738	September 15, 2017	Benedict Cumberbatch, Savannah Guthrie	Andy Grammer featuring LunchMoney Lewis
Tonight Show This Week in Words; Thank You Notes; Benedict Cumberbatch does a magic trick; Tonight Show Sentence Sneak (Benedict Cumberbatch); Savannah Guthrie autographs her book for Jimmy's daughters; Andy Grammer featuring LunchMoney Lewis performed "Give Love"
739	September 18, 2017	Demi Lovato, John Cleese	Demi Lovato
Jimmy congratulates Steve Higgins on his Emmy Award win; Tonight Show This Week in Memes; Demi Lovato and Jimmy exchange gifts; Tonight Show Best Friends Challenge (Demi Lovato); John Cleese answers audience questions; Demi Lovato performed "Sorry Not Sorry"
740	September 19, 2017	Kevin James, Ilana Glazer	Rudimental featuring James Arthur
Jimmy's birthday; Lip Sync Conversation (Demi Lovato); Kevin James brings Jimmy cookies; The Tonight Show Fall Classic (Kevin James); Rudimental featuring James Arthur performed "Sun Comes Up"
741	September 20, 2017	Ben Stiller, Fred Armisen	Little Big Town featuring Kacey Musgraves and Midland
Tonight Show Pros & Cons: Fall TV Shows; Speak for Yourself (Ben Stiller); Fred Armisen uses an app; Little Big Town featuring Kacey Musgraves and Midland performed a medley of songs
742	September 21, 2017	Megyn Kelly, Dave Franco	Fergie
Donald Trump Quotes; Bodyguard Job Application; Tonight Show Superlatives; Tonight Show #hashtags: #MyWeirdTeacher; Tonight Show Audience Suggestion Box (Tom Brokaw pronunciation videos, crew backpacks, No One Knows How to Pronounce La Croix, Black Simon & Garfunkel (appearance by Fergie)); Megyn Kelly brings Jimmy a pie; Jimmy gives Megyn Kelly a candle; Jimmy walks Megyn Kelly to the set of her Today show; Fergie performed "You Already Know"
743	September 22, 2017	Cast of Will & Grace, Colin Jost, Bruce Bozzi Jr.	Billie Joe Armstrong
Donald Trump Ad; Tonight Show This Week in Words; Thank You Notes; the cast of Will & Grace perform the series' theme song with lyrics; Billie Joe Armstrong performed "Ordinary World"
744	September 25, 2017	Madonna, Camila Cabello	Camila Cabello
Trump's NFL Rules; Dog Quote; Jimmy acknowledges Puerto Rico; Jimmy announces a week of shows dedicated to Miley Cyrus; Tonight Show Do Not Play; Madonna gives Jimmy a facial; Tonight Show Lip Flip (Madonna); Camila Cabello performed "Havana"
745	September 26, 2017	Kate Winslet, Milo Ventimiglia	G-Eazy featuring Cardi B
Jimmy interviews Hillary Clinton over the phone; Hostess White Fudge Ding Dong Commercial; This Is Us: A Backstage Look; Tonight Show Whisper Challenge (Kate Winslet); G-Eazy featuring Cardi B performed "No Limit"
746	September 27, 2017	Jared Leto, Nicole Richie	Tyler, The Creator
Tonight Show Pros & Cons: Being Uninvited to the White House; Tonight Show Name That Song Challenge (Jared Leto); Nicole Richie braids Jimmy's hair; Tyler, The Creator performed "See You Again"
747	September 28, 2017	Harrison Ford, Rachel Maddow, Kid Golfers	Charli XCX
Tax Reform Bill Titles; Donald Trump Video; Tonight Show #hashtags: #ThatWasTMI; Jimmy plays with kid golfers (appearance by Jason Day, Jordan Spieth); Harrison Ford and Jimmy have scotch; Charli XCX performed "Boys"
748	September 29, 2017	Will Forte, Terry Crews	Jack Whitehall
Tonight Show This Week in Words; Thank You Notes (appearance by Alec Baldwin); Will Forte gives Jimmy a puzzle; Tonight Show Think Fast! (Will Forte); Terry Crews and Jimmy continue their interview in chairs

=== October ===
No.	Original release date	Guest(s)	Musical/entertainment guest(s)
749	October 2, 2017	Adam Sandler & Dustin Hoffman, Miley Cyrus	Miley Cyrus
Jimmy acknowledges the 2017 Las Vegas shooting with a performance by Miley Cyrus and Adam Sandler of "No Freedom"; Tonight Show Musical Genre Challenge (Miley Cyrus); Miley Cyrus performed "The Climb"
750	October 3, 2017	Sarah Silverman, Cast of Riverdale	Miley Cyrus
Tonight Show Celebrity Photobomb (Miley Cyrus); Tonight Show Search Party (cast of Riverdale Vs. Jimmy Fallon & Cyrus family); Jimmy puts on Jughead Jones' beanie; The Riverdale Milkshake Challenge (cast of Riverdale); Miley Cyrus performed "Week Without You"
751	October 4, 2017	Hillary Clinton	Miley Cyrus
Politician Instagram Polls; Kraft Heinz Promo; Miley Cyrus and Jimmy performed "Islands in the Stream" as Dolly Parton and Kenny Rogers; female Tonight Show writers and Miley Cyrus do Thank You Notes for Hillary Clinton, and Clinton does a note; Miley Cyrus performed "These Boots Are Made for Walkin'"
752	October 5, 2017	Gal Gadot, Desus & Mero	Miley Cyrus and Billy Ray Cyrus
Twitter Transcript; Cereal Labels; Jimmy announces his new children's book; NBD (Miley Cyrus); Gal Gadot and Jimmy have chocolate and peanut butter cups; Charades (Jimmy Fallon & Gal Gadot Vs. Miley Cyrus & Tariq); Desus & Mero and Jimmy have pickles; Miley Cyrus and Billy Ray Cyrus performed "Wildflowers"
753	October 6, 2017	Taraji P. Henson, Miley Cyrus	Billy Joel and Miley Cyrus
Thank You Notes; Lip Sync Battle (Miley Cyrus); Taraji P. Henson uses meditation bowls; Jimmy gives Miley Cyrus a Hashtag the Panda head; Billy Joel and Miley Cyrus performed "New York State of Mind" (pre-recorded at Madison Square Garden).
754	October 9, 2017	Tyler Perry, Lea Michele	Jhené Aiko featuring Big Sean
Wendy Walker; Jimmy announces $1,000,000 donation with Walmart to Puerto Rico relief; Madea is the new White House Communications Director; Jhené Aiko featuring Big Sean performed "Moments"
755	October 10, 2017	Mandy Moore, Shaquille O'Neal	Noah Cyrus
IQ Test; Porg Memes; Star Wars: The Last Jedi trailer re-dubbed with Shaq; Guy Who Invented the "Poke" Button; audience members get a copy of Jimmy's new children's book; Tonight Show Pros & Cons: Trump's Space Program; Password (Jimmy Fallon & Shaquille O'Neal Vs. Mandy Moore & Noah Cyrus); Jimmy gives Shaquille O'Neal his new children's book; Noah Cyrus performed "Again"
756	October 11, 2017	Margot Robbie, Stephen Moyer	Rachel Feinstein
Jeff Sessions Quote; Tonight Show What to Buy; Box of Lies (Margot Robbie); Stephen Moyer does karaoke
757	October 12, 2017	Miles Teller, P!nk, Austin Rogers	William Patrick Corgan
Tonight Show #hashtags: #FallSongs (appearance by P!nk); Jimmy gives Austin Rogers a gift; William Patrick Corgan performed "Aeronaut"
758	October 13, 2017	Blake Lively, Gabrielle Union	Wu-Tang Clan
Friday the 13th Sequel Trailer; Tonight Show This Week in Words; Thank You Notes; debut of new All I See Is You trailer; Tonight Show Dance Battle (Blake Lively); Michael Symon brings out food for Gabrielle Union and Jimmy; Wu-Tang Clan performed "My Only One"
759	October 23, 2017	Clive Owen, Colleen Ballinger, Julia Michaels	Julia Michaels
Rumors; Real Melania Trump; Donald Trump Response Video; Tonight Show Bad Signs; Clive Owen brings Jimmy pickled onions from his daughter; Clive Owen ties a bow tie; Julia Michaels performed "Worst in Me"
760	October 24, 2017	Ricky Gervais, Lin-Manuel Miranda	Sabrina Carpenter
Lawmaker Quotes; Freestylin' with The Roots (appearance by Lin-Manuel Miranda); Tonight Show Face It Challenge (Ricky Gervais); Lin-Manuel Miranda and Jimmy lip sync "Polka Party!"; Sabrina Carpenter performed "Why"
761	October 25, 2017	Jessica Alba, J. B. Smoove, Kevin Delaney	N/A
Donald Trump Names; Juilo Torres; Tonight Show Pros & Cons: Choosing a Halloween Costume; Jessica Alba tries Jimmy's secret ice cream flavor; Catchphrase (J. B. Smoove & Tariq Vs. Jimmy Fallon & Jessica Alba)
762	October 26, 2017	Kelly Ripa, Jim Jefferies	Cole Swindell
Donald Trump Video; Joe Biden Quotes; Tonight Show Superlatives; Stokley Williams sits in with The Roots; Tonight Show I've Got Good News and Good News; Tonight Show #hashtags: #DogHalloweenCostumes; Cole Swindell performed "Stay Downtown"
763	October 27, 2017	Denis Leary, 2 Chainz	2 Chainz featuring Travis Scott
Schoolhouse Trump!; Tonight Show This Week in Words: Halloween Edition; Thank You Notes; 2 Chainz brings his dog and water; 2 Chainz featuring Travis Scott performed "4 AM"
764	October 30, 2017	Blake Shelton, Andrea Martin	Blake Shelton
Tonight Show Monday Motivation; The News: A Horror Movie; Jimmy imitates Blake Shelton; Caramel Apple Roulette (Blake Shelton); Blake Shelton performed "At the House"
765	October 31, 2017	Millie Bobby Brown, Kelly Clarkson	Kelly Clarkson
Tonight Show This Week in Memes; Millie Bobby Brown raps; Kelly Clarkson sings backwards; Kelly Clarkson performed "Whole Lotta Woman"

=== November ===
No.	Original release date	Guest(s)	Musical/entertainment guest(s)
766	November 1, 2017	Chris Hemsworth, Lindsey Vonn	Maroon 5 featuring SZA
Donald Trump Jr. Tweets; Tonight Show Popular Mathematics; Jimmy announces his new ice cream; Tonight Show Breaking Thor (Chris Hemsworth); Lindsey Vonn gives Jimmy sportswear; Maroon 5 featuring SZA performed "What Lovers Do"
767	November 2, 2017	Alec Baldwin, The Cast of Stranger Things, Jose Altuve	Elbow
The Lion King with Donald Trump clips; Ken Rosenthal Interview (with Keegan-Michael Key); Tonight Show G'Readings (Alec Baldwin); Tonight Show Dance Battle (Stranger Things cast); José Altuve brings Jimmy a hat; Elbow performed "Magnificent (She Says)"
768	November 13, 2017	Jeff Daniels, Mary J. Blige	Taylor Swift
Donald Trump Burn Book; Mark Kelley has a catchphrase; Tonight Show The Big Question; Jimmy acknowledges the death of his mother and the cancellation of last week's tapings; Taylor Swift performed "New Year's Day"; Tonight Show Do Not Play
769	November 14, 2017	Michael Strahan, Jenna & Barbara Bush	Tove Lo
Donald Trump Guest Book Writing; Donald Trump White House Website Writing; Jimmy announces his prize for Night of Too Many Stars (appearance by Jon Stewart); Tonight Show Superlatives (appearance by NASCAR drivers); Michael Strahan does a chant; Tove Lo performed "Disco Tits"
770	November 15, 2017	Gary Oldman, Gigi Hadid, Darryl Strawberry	Macklemore featuring Travis Thompson & Dave B
Donald Trump's Customs Form; Kel Mitchell makes an appearance; Tonight Show Audience Suggestion Box (Fifty Shades Freed trailer re-dubbed with Pee-wee Herman and Shaq, hand turkeys, Katerine and Jimmy performed "Moustache"); Gary Oldman does impressions; Gigi Hadid brings shoes; Gigi Hadid and Jimmy have burgers; Macklemore featuring Travis Thompson & Dave B performed "Corner Store"
771	November 16, 2017	Chance the Rapper, Tim McGraw & Faith Hill	Tim McGraw & Faith Hill
The Elf on the Shelf; Tonight Show #hashtags: #FootballRaps; Tonight Show Search Party (Tim McGraw, Questlove & Tariq Vs. Faith Hill, Jimmy Fallon and James Poyser); Tim McGraw & Faith Hill performed "Break First"
772	November 17, 2017	Jessica Chastain, Timothée Chalamet, Justin Verlander & Kate Upton	A musical tribute to Sharon Jones
Tonight Show This Week in Words; Thank You Notes; Casting Call (Jessica Chastain); The Dap-Kings performed "Sail On!/Searching for a New Day" in tribute to Sharon Jones
773	November 20, 2017	Bryan Cranston, Stephen Curry	GoldLink featuring Brent Faiyaz & Shy Glizzy
Trump's Planet Earth; Aged Balloons; Patti Harrison; Tonight Show Good Name Bad Name Great Name; GoldLink featuring Brent Faiyaz & Shy Glizzy performed "Crew"
774	November 21, 2017	Gwen Stefani, Justin Hartley, Johnny Bananas	Gwen Stefani
Donald Trump Profile; Maroon 5 and Jimmy go under disguise in the New York subway; Gwen Stefani performed "Under the Christmas Lights"
775	November 22, 2017	Denzel Washington, Allison Williams	Talib Kweli featuring Rick Ross & Yummy Bingham
Arthur Meyer; Tonight Show #hashtags: #ThanksgivingFails; Random Object Shootout (Denzel Washington, appearance by Stephen Curry); Talib Kweli featuring Rick Ross & Yummy Bingham performed "Heads Up Eyes Open"
776	November 23, 2017	Jerry Seinfeld, Robert Irwin	N/A
Toy Crossovers; Tonight Show Superlatives; Thank You Notes; Tonight Show Stand–up Battle (Jerry Seinfeld)
777	November 27, 2017	Martin Short, Gina Rodriguez	Spoon
Miss Backup USA; Victor Wooten sits in with The Roots; Jimmy promotes the Amazon Echo Show; Tonight Show This Week in Memes; The Little Trumper Boys (Martin Short); Spoon performed "Do I Have to Talk You Into It"
778	November 28, 2017	Daisy Ridley, Jim Belushi	Liam Gallagher
Trump Family Christmas Cards; RokShok Commercial; Tonight Show Pros & Cons: Trump Not Being Named Time's Person of the Year; Monica sits in with The Roots; Tonight Show Whisper Challenge (Daisy Ridley); Holiday Gift Guide with Kate Berlant & John Early; Liam Gallagher performed "Come Back to Me"
779	November 29, 2017	John Boyega, Kevin Nealon	N/A
Bust Quotes; Tonight Show Do Not Read; Daisy Ridley tells John Boyega to dance; GE Tonight Show Fallonventions: Kid's Inventions
780	November 30, 2017	Kumail Nanjiani, Kristaps Porziņģis	Miguel
Tonight Show Superlatives; Tonight Show #hashtags: #DecorationDisaster; Miguel performed "Sky Walker"

=== December ===
No.	Original release date	Guest(s)	Musical/entertainment guest(s)
781	December 1, 2017	Queen Latifah, Freddie Highmore	Sam Smith
DMX Frosty the Snowman; Thank You Notes; Hot Sax; Queen Latifah's father comes out and is interviewed; Sam Smith performed "Too Good at Goodbyes"
782	December 4, 2017	Keegan-Michael Key, Claire Foy, J. J. Watt	St. Vincent
Senator Cory Gardner; Trump Tweets Alarm Clock Commercial; Jimmy performs as Bruce Springsteen ("Robert Mueller Is Comin' to Town"); Jimmy gives Keegan-Michael Key cassettes; J. J. Watt reads letter from Jose Altuve; St. Vincent performed "Slow Disco"
783	December 5, 2017	Kate McKinnon, Patton Oswalt	Wiz Khalifa featuring Ty Dolla $ign
Roy Moore (Patton Oswalt); Jimmy announces a live book reading; Tonight Show Virtual Pictionary (Kate McKinnon & Jimmy Fallon Vs. Tariq & Patton Oswalt); Kate McKinnon does excursion sounds; Wiz Khalifa featuring Ty Dolla $ign performed "Something New"
784	December 6, 2017	John Cena, Bridget Everett	Beck
Yamaneika Saunders makes an appearance during the monologue; John Cena speaks Mandarin; Tonight Show Mad Lib Theater (John Cena); Bridget Everett performed "The Climb"; Beck performed "Up All Night"
785	December 7, 2017	James Franco, Niall Horan	Niall Horan
Presi–Dent Adhesive Cream Commercial; Tonight Show Superlatives; Tonight Show 12 Days of Christmas Sweaters; Tonight Show Cooler Heads (James Franco); Niall Horan performed "Too Much to Ask"
786	December 8, 2017	Hugh Jackman, Luke Bryan	Luke Bryan
Did You Know? Writings; Tonight Show This Week in Words; Tonight Show 12 Days of Christmas Sweaters; Thank You Notes; Luke Bryan and Jimmy have chili dogs and beer; Luke Bryan performed "What Makes You Country"
787	December 11, 2017	Zendaya, Billy Crudup	Big Sean & Metro Boomin
Donald Trump RoboCall; Star Wars characters re-edited to sing "MMMBop"; Tonight Show 12 Days of Christmas Sweaters; Charades (Jimmy Fallon & Zendaya Vs. Tariq & Billy Crudup); Big Sean & Metro Boomin performed "Whose Stopping Me/Savage Time"
788	December 12, 2017	Annette Bening, Judd Apatow	SZA
Tonight Show 12 Days of Christmas Sweaters; Peanuts Trailer (in the style of Riverdale, appearance by Riverdale cast); SZA performed "Supermodel"
789	December 13, 2017	Michael Shannon, Alison Brie	Jaboukie Young-White
Yamaneika Saunders makes an appearance during the monologue; Jamaaladeen Tacuma sits in with The Roots; Tonight Show 12 Days of Christmas Sweaters; Tonight Show Screengrabs; Michael Shannon brings out eggnog; Michael Shannon brings antlers out for Alison Brie
790	December 14, 2017	Kevin Hart, Hailee Steinfeld	Hailee Steinfeld & Alesso featuring watt
Twas the Trump Before Christmas; Tonight Show Superlatives; Tonight Show 12 Days of Christmas Sweaters; Tonight Show #hashtags: #WorstGiftEver; Kevin Hart comes out with The Rockettes; Hailee Steinfeld & Alesso featuring watt performed "Let Me Go"
791	December 15, 2017	Benicio del Toro, Ruby Rose, Tariq "Black Thought" Trotter	Michael McDonald
Star Wars: The Fast Wet Guy; Statue Quotes; Tonight Show This Week in Words; Tonight Show 12 Days of Christmas Sweaters; Thank You Notes; Benicio del Toro and Jimmy have cocktails; Jimmy gives Tariq a printed version of his freestyle; Tariq does a freestyle; Michael McDonald performed "Find It in Your Heart"
792	December 18, 2017	Anna Kendrick, Rhett & Link, Randy Newman	Randy Newman
Instagram Photo Quotes; Julio Torres; Tonight Show 12 Days of Christmas Sweaters; Jimmy Fallon, Darlene Love, Anna Kendrick & The Roots sing "Christmas (Baby, Please Come Home)" with classroom instruments; Anna Kendrick does a Kristen Stewart impression; Rhett & Link bring Jimmy a Christmas bootie; Rhett & Link and Jimmy have ice cream; Randy Newman performed "It's a Jungle Out There"
793	December 19, 2017	Rebel Wilson, Paul Reiser	Gwen Stefani
Statue & Courtroom Sketch Quotes; The Hall of Presidents Commercial; Tonight Show 12 Days of Christmas Sweaters; Tonight Show Google Translate Songs (Rebel Wilson); Gwen Stefani performed "Last Christmas"
794	December 20, 2017	Christoph Waltz, Beanie Feldstein, Cardi B	Erykah Badu
Google Searches; Tonight Show 12 Days of Christmas Sweaters; Tonight Show #hashtags: #MyDumbTradition; Christoph Waltz tries on a Christmas sweater; Erykah Badu performed "On & On/Sorrow Tears and Blood"
795	December 21, 2017	Jason Sudeikis, Amy Sedaris	Robert Kelly
Donald Trump Recites Lines from Holiday Films; Tonight Show 12 Days of Christmas Sweaters; Tonight Show Bar Curling (Jason Sudeikis, Becca & Matt Hamilton); Amy Sedaris & Jo Firestone show holiday toys
796	December 22, 2017	Anderson Cooper & Andy Cohen, Issa Rae	DRAM featuring BigBabyMom
Donald Trump Moments Countdown; Sea Turtle Quote; Tonight Show Superlatives; Tonight Show 12 Days of Christmas Sweaters (Jimmy gives audience member $6,000 plus $50,000 to Girl Scout Troup 6000); Thank You Notes; Andy Cohen, Anderson Cooper and Jimmy celebrate the new year; DRAM featuring BigBabyMom performed "Silver Bells"
