= List of The Tonight Show Starring Jimmy Fallon episodes (2018) =

- No. of episodes: 192

Release
- Original network: NBC
- Original release: January 8 – December 20, 2018

Season chronology
- ← Previous; 2017 episodes Next → 2019 episodes

This is the list of episodes for The Tonight Show Starring Jimmy Fallon in 2018.

== 2018 ==
=== January ===
No.	Original release date	Guest(s)	Musical/entertainment guest(s)
797	January 8, 2018	Braden Sanwick, Michael Che	Sofi Tukker
Tonight Show This Week in Memes; Tonight Show Quiplash (Taraji P. Henson & Jimmy Fallon Vs. Tariq & Michael Che); Sofi Tukker performed "Best Friend"
798	January 9, 2018	Hugh Grant, Greta Gerwig	A$AP Ferg
Questlove and Tariq re-enact a scene from The Bachelor; PJ Morton sits in with the Roots; Tonight Show Polls; Tonight Show Do Not Play; Hugh Grant and Jimmy drink beer from a shoe; A$AP Ferg performed "Plain Jane"
799	January 10, 2018	Saoirse Ronan, Timothée Chalamet	Camila Cabello
The Straitjacket Suit for Presidents Ad; Tonight Show Bad Signs; Catchphrase (Saoirse Ronan & Jimmy Fallon Vs. Timothée Chalamet & Tariq); Camila Cabello performed "Never Be the Same"
800	January 11, 2018	Sam Rockwell, Tig Notaro	Alan Walker featuring Noah Cyrus
Tonight Show #hashtags: #WorstFirstDate; Charades (Patty Jenkins & Tariq Vs. Jimmy Fallon & Gal Gadot); Tig Notaro brings food for herself; Tig Notaro and Jimmy do jumping jacks; Alan Walker featuring Noah Cyrus performed "All Falls Down"
801	January 12, 2018	James Spader, Camila Cabello	Pete Lee
Tonight Show Superlatives; Tonight Show This Week in Words; Thank You Notes; Tonight Show Battle of the Instant Songwriters
802	January 15, 2018	Lily Tomlin & Jane Fonda, Cole Sprouse	Walk the Moon
Jimmy performs as James Taylor ("Fire and Fury"); Google Arts and Culture App Results; Password (Lily Tomlin & Jane Fonda Vs. Cole Sprouse & Jimmy Fallon); Cole Sprouse gives Jimmy a sketch; Walk the Moon performed "One Foot"
803	January 16, 2018	Chris Hemsworth, Carrie Brownstein	Caitlyn Smith
Mike Pence Blush Scale; The Fake News Awards (appearance by Gina Gershon, Rachel Dratch); Tonight Show Jinx Challenge (Chris Hemsworth); Caitlyn Smith performed "Contact High"
804	January 17, 2018	Savannah Guthrie & Hoda Kotb, Édgar Ramírez	French Montana
Donald Trump Montreal Cognitive Assessment Answers; Jimmy announces his new ice cream product; Jimmy Fallon, Camila Cabello & the Roots sing "Havana" with classroom instruments; Freestylin' with the Roots; French Montana performed "Famous"
805	January 18, 2018	Jessica Chastain, Ricky Martin	Franz Ferdinand
Donald Trump Dr. Seuss Book; Dunkin' Donuts Ad; Tonight Show #hashtags: #FitnessFail; Lip Sync Battle (Jimmy Fallon & the New Day Vs. Stephanie McMahon & Triple H); Jessica Chastain and Jimmy act out scenes; Franz Ferdinand performed "Always Ascending"
806	January 19, 2018	Trevor Noah, Dakota Fanning	Jeff Dye
Yamaneika Saunders; Tonight Show Superlatives; Tonight Show This Week in Words; Thank You Notes
807	January 22, 2018	Greg Kinnear, Jason Momoa	The War on Drugs
Democrats Want Republicans Want Trump Wants; Congressman/woman Quotes; Tonight Show Popular Mathematics; Water War (Jason Momoa); The War on Drugs performed "Pain"
808	January 23, 2018	Alex Rodriguez, Taylor Kitsch, Clive Davis	Bebe Rexha featuring Florida Georgia Line
Chuck Schumer Quotes; Melania Excuse Generator; Tonight Show Do Not Read; Hitting Contest (Alex Rodriguez); Bebe Rexha featuring Florida Georgia Line performed "Meant to Be"
809	January 24, 2018	Ice-T, Meghan Trainor	The Avett Brothers
Donald Trump Tweets; Tonight Show Audience Suggestion Box (Donald Trump candy hearts, Ice-T Tide Pod PSA, Tonight Show Word on the Street, The Gentleman's Chorus performed "Good Riddance (Time of Your Life)"); Judd Apatow introduces The Avett Brothers; The Avett Brothers performed "No Hard Feelings"
810	January 25, 2018	Will Ferrell, Robert Irwin	Migos
Tonight Show #hashtags: #MisheardLyrics; Heckler (Will Ferrell); Migos performed "Stir Fry"
811	January 26, 2018	Chelsea Handler, Desus & Mero	Rob Haze
Dunkin' Donuts Ad; Thank You Notes; Desus & Mero and Jimmy have sandwiches
812	January 29, 2018	Dakota Johnson, Lester Holt	Jason Aldean
Tonight Show Pros & Cons: Trump's State of the Union Address; Tonight Show Think Fast! (Dakota Johnson); Jason Aldean performed "You Make It Easy"
813	January 30, 2018	Michael Strahan, Chrissy Teigen	The Voidz
Donald Trump Message; Donald Trump Phone Call; Tonight Show Best Friends Challenge (Chrissy Teigen); The Voidz performed "Leave It in My Dreams"
814	January 31, 2018	Katie Couric, Rita Ora	Liam Payne & Rita Ora
Donald Trump Spanish–English Translation Guide; Tonight Show Screengrabs; Puppy Predictors: 2018 Super Bowl Edition; Olympics Two Truths and a Lie (Katie Couric); Liam Payne & Rita Ora performed "For You"

=== February ===
No.	Original release date	Guest(s)	Musical/entertainment guest(s)
815	February 1, 2018	Sam Smith, Cecily Strong	Dan White
The Roots do viral videos; Tonight Show The Big Question; Tonight Show #hashtags: #MyWeirdSuperstition
816	February 4, 2018	Justin Timberlake, Cast of This Is Us, Dwayne Johnson	Justin Timberlake featuring Chris Stapleton
Justin Timberlake opens the show with "Supplies"; Tonight Show Superlatives; Songversation (Justin Timberlake); Jimmy goes backstage, performs as Bob Dylan ("The Times They Are a-Changin'"); debut of Skyscraper trailer; Justin Timberlake featuring Chris Stapleton performed "Say Something"
817	February 6, 2018	Sarah Jessica Parker, Jesse Tyler Ferguson, Super Bowl Championship Philadelphia Eagles	Diplo featuring MØ and GoldLink
Tonight Show Problematic Apologies: Lady Doritos Edition; Tonight Show Super Bowl Nifty Shoe; Tonight Show Mad Lib Theater (Sarah Jessica Parker); Jesse Tyler Ferguson and Jimmy wear wigs; Diplo featuring MØ and GoldLink performed "Get It Right"
818	February 7, 2018	Sienna Miller, Tim Tebow	Noel Gallagher's High Flying Birds
Tye Tribbett & G.A. sits in with the Roots; Tonight Show This Week in Memes; Tonight Show Kid Letters; Tonight Show Lip Flip (Sienna Miller); Noel Gallagher's High Flying Birds performed "It's a Beautiful World"
819	February 8, 2018	Andrew Garfield, Rachel Brosnahan	Bonnie McFarlane
Julio Torres; Tonight Show #hashtags: #WhyImSingle; Catchphrase (Andrew Garfield & Steve Higgins Vs. Jimmy Fallon & Rachel Brosnahan)
820	February 9, 2018	Paul Rudd, Laurie Metcalf	Alice Merton
Donald Trump Mispronunciations; Valentines Day Cards; Thank You Notes; Go West Music Video (appearance by Paul Rudd); Jimmy gives Paul Rudd a gift basket; Alice Merton performed "No Roots"
821	February 26, 2018	John Lithgow, Kelly Clarkson	Kacey Musgraves
Tonight Show I've Got Good News and Good News; Tonight Show Google Translate Songs (Kelly Clarkson); Kacey Musgraves performed "Space Cowboy"
822	February 27, 2018	Bruce Willis, Retta	Towkio
Donald Trump Nominees; Freestylin' with the Roots (appearance by Bruce Willis); Bruce Willis explains his arm injury; Towkio performed "Symphony"
823	February 28, 2018	Chadwick Boseman, Marlon Wayans, Mike "Rooster" McConaughey & Butch	Devin Dawson
Black Panther fans thank Chadwick Boseman; Tonight Show True Confessions (Chadwick Boseman, Marlon Wayans); Mike "Rooster" McConaughey & Butch and Jimmy have a toast; Devin Dawson performed "All on Me"

=== March ===
No.	Original release date	Guest(s)	Musical/entertainment guest(s)
824	March 1, 2018	Alicia Keys, Darren Criss	Rudy Francisco
Andrew Carn; Tonight Show #hashtags: #HowIGotDumped; Tonight Show Whisper Challenge (Alicia Keys)
825	March 2, 2018	Lin-Manuel Miranda & "Weird Al" Yankovic, Macaulay Culkin, U.S. Men's Olympic Curling Gold Medalists	Francis and the Lights
Trump Administration Nicknames; Thank You Notes; Lin-Manuel Miranda & "Weird Al" Yankovic and Jimmy lip sync "The Hamilton Polka"; Macaulay Culkin and Jimmy put on bunny ears and take a selfie; U.S. Men's Olympic Curling Gold Medalists performed "Don't Stop Believin'"; Francis and the Lights performed "Just for Us"
826	March 5, 2018	Katie Holmes, Brian Tyree Henry, U.S. Women's Olympic Ice Hockey Champions	Meghan Trainor
Mascots interrupt the monologue; U.S. Women's Olympic Ice Hockey Champions give Jimmy a jersey; Meghan Trainor performed "No Excuses"
827	March 6, 2018	John Oliver, Lucy Hale	Marshmello & Anne-Marie
U-God sits in with the Roots; Tonight Show Do Not Play; Marshmello & Anne-Marie performed "Friends"
828	March 7, 2018	John Cena, Katherine Langford	JD & the Straight Shot
Ten Seconds; Ew! sketch (John Cena); Jimmy teaches John Cena a dance move; JD & the Straight Shot performed "Shambala"
829	March 8, 2018	Sterling K. Brown, Jack Antonoff	Bleachers
Congressman/senator Quotes; Sarah Huckabee Sanders; Tonight Show #hashtags: #IfIHadASuperpower; Tonight Show Think Fast! (Sterling K. Brown); Bleachers performed "Alfie's Song (Not So Typical Love Song)"
830	March 9, 2018	Drew Barrymore, Josh Radnor	Kelsey Cook
Thank You Notes; Tonight Show Best Friends Challenge (Drew Barrymore)
831	March 12, 2018	Alec Baldwin, Billy Crudup	Nathaniel Rateliff & the Night Sweats
Campaign Slogans; Things That Are More Fun Than a Trump Rally; Tonight Show Popular Mathematics; Billy Crudup brings out trophies; Nathaniel Rateliff & the Night Sweats performed "You Worry Me"
832	March 13, 2018	Ricky Gervais, Chris Sullivan	Amy Shark
Donald Trump Tweets; Concert Tour Posters; Student Quotes; Miss the Bus; Tonight Show Bad Signs; Amy Shark performed "Adore"
833	March 14, 2018	Alicia Vikander, Jim Sturgess	Kali Uchis featuring Tyler, the Creator
Arthur Meyer; Tonight Show This Week in Memes; Irish Christmas Eve (Alicia Vikander); Jim Sturgess juggles; Kali Uchis featuring Tyler, the Creator performed "After the Storm"
834	March 15, 2018	Bill Hader, Jimmy Buffett	Troye Sivan
Shaq Bracket; Mascot Quotes; March Madness Team Motivational Speech; Tonight Show #hashtags: #MyDrunkStory; Tonight Show Face It Challenge (Bill Hader); Jimmy Buffett performed "Margaritaville"; Troye Sivan performed "My My My!"
835	March 16, 2018	Aaron Paul, Karlie Kloss	Jacqueline Novak
The Roots speak in Irish accents; Drunk People Try to Do Things; TV Show Titles; Thank You Notes; Charades (Aaron Paul & Tariq Vs. Karlie Kloss & Jimmy Fallon); Jimmy gives Aaron Paul an album for his baby daughter; Jimmy brings out two students from Karlie Kloss' coding program
836	March 19, 2018	Blake Shelton, Scott Eastwood	Blake Shelton
Tonight Show Polls; Tonight Show Name That Song Challenge (Blake Shelton); Blake Shelton performed "I Lived It"
837	March 20, 2018	John Boyega, Bob Saget	PRhyme featuring 2 Chainz
Compromises; Jimmy and Blake Go to a Palm Reader; Tonight Show Virtual Reality Pictionary (John Boyega & Jimmy Fallon Vs. Tariq & Bella Thorne); PRhyme featuring 2 Chainz performed "Flirt"
838	March 21, 2018	James McAvoy, Zoey Deutch	Panic! at the Disco
Donald Trump Commercial; Jay Leno subs in for Jimmy during the monologue; Tonight Show Audience Suggestion Box (James McAvoy sends a tweet, writers' mom's voicemail, adult Anne Geddes babies, Brendon Urie performed DuckTales theme song); Zoey Deutch does a face-lift impression; Panic! at the Disco performed "Say Amen (Saturday Night)"
839	March 22, 2018	Will Smith, Fran Lebowitz	Billie Eilish
Donald Trump/Joe Biden Quotes; Where My Peeps At?; Tonight Show #hashtags: #MyDumbBet; Will Smith films the set; Will Smith and Jimmy performed theme song remixes; Billie Eilish performed "Bellyache"
840	March 23, 2018	Tyler Perry, Jim Jefferies	Joe List
60 Minutes Opening; Robert Mueller Interview Topics; Trump Administration Quotes; Meteorologist Shoutout; Tonight Show The Big Question; Thank You Notes; Taraji P. Henson makes a surprise appearance

=== April ===
No.	Original release date	Guest(s)	Musical/entertainment guest(s)
841	April 2, 2018	Tracy Morgan, Kate Mara	Chris Lane featuring Tori Kelly
White House Intern Inner Thoughts; Heads of Government Quotes; Heckler (Tracy Morgan); Jared Leto and A$AP Rocky make surprise appearances; Chris Lane featuring Tori Kelly performed "Take Back Home Girl"
842	April 3, 2018	John Krasinski, Abigail Spencer	Jade Bird
Jimmy promotes A Quiet Place at the top of the program; Police Officer Quotes; Donald Trump Video; Freestylin' with the Roots; Jade Bird performed "Lottery"
843	April 4, 2018	Mike Myers, Abbi Jacobson	A$AP Rocky
Tariq asks Jimmy about "April Showers" saying at the top of the program; Football Player/Statue Quotes; Dr. Evil (Mike Myers); Password (Abbi Jacobson & A$AP Rocky Vs. Tariq & Questlove); A$AP Rocky performed a medley of songs
844	April 5, 2018	Norman Reedus, Wendy Williams	Nate Bargatze
Tech Company Mascot Quotes; Desus & Mero make a surprise appearance; Tonight Show #hashtags: #MyWeirdRoommate
845	April 6, 2018	Tiffany Haddish, Jay Chandrasekhar & Kevin Heffernan	Rich the Kid
Tiffany Haddish and Jimmy dance at the top of the program; Tariq raps about American Idol; Thank You Notes; Tonight Show Wheel of Opinions (Tiffany Haddish); Rich the Kid performed "Plug Walk"
846	April 9, 2018	John Mulaney, Cardi B	Cardi B
Cardi B makes an appearance at the top of the program; Cardi B co-hosts the show; Tonight Show What Is Up with That Coat?; Tonight Show Mom Quiz; Cardi B records a voicemail for a fan; John Mulaney gives Cardi B a baby gift; Jimmy gives Cardi B books for her new baby; Box of Lies (Cardi B); Cardi B performed "Money Bag"
847	April 10, 2018	Jon Hamm, Emily Ratajkowski, Patrick Reed	Khalid & Normani
Wheel of Fortune Mistakes; Jon Hamm makes an appearance during the monologue; Charades (Tariq & Jon Hamm Vs. Jimmy Fallon & Emily Ratajkowski); Jon Hamm does a Ray Romano impression; Khalid & Normani performed "Love Lies" . In the audience, italian TV Late Show Host Alessandro Cattelan.
848	April 11, 2018	Kerry Washington, Gad Elmaleh	5 Seconds of Summer
Donald Trump Sound Effects for Solo: A Star Wars Story Trailer; Tonight Show Do Not Read; Tonight Show Mad Lib Theater (Kerry Washington); Jimmy does a Jerry Seinfeld impression in French; Gad Elmaleh and Jimmy dance; 5 Seconds of Summer performed "Want You Back"
849	April 12, 2018	Jack White, Grace Jones	Tinashe featuring Offset
Donald Trump Photo Ad; Donald Trump Video; Tonight Show News & Improved; Tonight Show #hashtags: #IGotBusted; Tinashe featuring Offset performed "No Drama"
850	April 13, 2018	Jeff Daniels, Joe Manganiello	Mike Vecchione
Mark Bream; Animal Quotes; Thank You Notes; Jeff Daniels performed an original song
851	April 16, 2018	Robert De Niro, Bridget Everett	Rex Orange County
Meeting Trump "Oh-No" Faces; James Comey Book Blurbs; Jimmy asks Amazon Alexa questions; The Roots tell dog-themed jokes; Robert De Niro Has Never Seen a Dog; Tonight Show Sidewalk Cinema; Bridget Everett sings to her dog; Rex Orange County performed "Loving Is Easy"
852	April 17, 2018	Joel McHale, Michael Che	Offset & Metro Boomin
Joel McHale makes an appearance during the monologue; Basketball Terms; Beyoncé Fan Quotes; Tonight Show Audience Suggestion Box (Offset raps chicken stir fry recipe, Bonk! app, The Gentlemen's Chorus performed "My Own Worst Enemy"); Catchphrase (Joel McHale & Michael Che Vs. Jimmy Fallon & Offset); Offset & Metro Boomin performed "Ric Flair Drip" (appearance by Ric Flair)
853	April 18, 2018	Claire Danes, Letitia Wright, Kevin Delaney	N/A
Courtroom Sketch/Statue Quotes; Weed Side Effects; Tonight Show #hashtags: #StonerStories; Tonight Show Wheel of Freestyle (Letitia Wright)
854	April 19, 2018	Tina Fey, Evan Rachel Wood	Mean Girls
Tonight Show Superlatives; debut of short film directed by Tina Fey's daughters; Tina Fey fans thank her; Jimmy thanks Tina Fey; Mean Girls performed "I'd Rather Be Me"
855	April 20, 2018	Anthony Mackie, Ralph Macchio	Kiry Shabazz
Donald Trump Impressions; Thank You Notes; Tonight Show Karate Pinata (Anthony Mackie Vs. Ralph Macchio)
856	April 23, 2018	Adam Sandler & Chris Rock, Sting & Shaggy	Sting & Shaggy
Nigel Duffy; Donald Trump Earth Day Message; Tonight Show This Week in Memes; Tonight Show Who Sang It? (Sting & Shaggy); Sting & Shaggy performed "Don't Make Me Wait"
857	April 24, 2018	Kevin James, Questlove	Sigrid
Donald Trump Etiquette Guide; Tonight Show Kid Impressions; The Tonight Show Spring Fall Classic (Kevin James); One–Second Song Quiz: Prince Edition (Questlove); Sigrid performed "Strangers"
858	April 25, 2018	Serena Williams, Priyanka Chopra	David Blaine
The cast of Avengers: Infinity War sing The Brady Bunch theme song parody (The Marvel Bunch); Axe-Throwing Contest (Serena Williams); Skittles Challenge (Priyanka Chopra)
859	April 26, 2018	Kevin Bacon, Alexis Bledel	The Bacon Brothers
Yamaneika Saunders; Tonight Show #hashtags: #MySuperpower; First Drafts of Rock (Kevin Bacon); The Bacon Brothers performed "Tom Petty T-Shirt"
860	April 27, 2018	Dr. Phil McGraw, Hailey Baldwin	Julio Torres
Brenda Bishop; Avengers: Infinity War Promo; Tonight Show Superlatives; Avengers: The Slippery Floor; Thank You Notes; Two Truths and a Lie (Dr. Phil McGraw); Hailey Baldwin does a party trick
861	April 30, 2018	Roseanne Barr, Tony Hale	Miguel
Curious George Books; Tonight Show News & Improved; Tonight Show Do Not Play; Miguel performed "Come Through and Chill"

=== May ===
No.	Original release date	Guest(s)	Musical/entertainment guest(s)
862	May 1, 2018	Ariana Grande	Ariana Grande
Ariana Grande and Jimmy in the dressing room; Trump Soundtrack: Ariana Grande Edition; Ariana Grande meets fans; NBD (Ariana Grande); Tonight Show Musical Genre Challenge; Ariana Grande performed "No Tears Left to Cry"
863	May 2, 2018	Savannah Guthrie & Hoda Kotb, Robert Irwin, Jaden Smith	Jaden Smith
Tonight Show Kid Art; Jaden Smith freestyles; Jaden Smith performed "Icon"
864	May 3, 2018	Steve Martin & Martin Short, Poppy Delevingne	Steep Canyon Rangers
Andrew Karn; Tonight Show #hashtags: #ILostABet; Tonight Show Best Friends Challenge (Steve Martin & Martin Short); Poppy Delevingne brings beer; Poppy Delevingne's birthday; Poppy Delevingne does a party trick; Steep Canyon Rangers performed "Out in the Open"
865	May 4, 2018	John Goodman, Zoe Lister-Jones	Josh Blue
Thank You Notes; Tonight Show Puppy Predictors: 2018 Kentucky Derby Edition; John Goodman plays air saxophone; Zoe Lister-Jones brings Jimmy a personalized glass
866	May 7, 2018	Michael Shannon, Andrew Rannells	Father John Misty
Tonight Show Word on the Street; Tonight Show Screengrabs; Andrew Rannells and Jimmy performed "Born to Run"; Father John Misty performed "Mr. Tillman"
867	May 8, 2018	Trevor Noah, Gabrielle Union	Chromeo featuring DRAM
Teachers sit in the audience; Freestylin' with the Roots; Saugerties High School (Gabrielle Union); Chromeo featuring DRAM performed "Must've Been"
868	May 9, 2018	Jennifer Lopez, Phoebe Waller-Bridge	Car Seat Headrest
New Star Wars Themed Slogans; Tonight Show Popular Mathematics; Tonight Show Fast Dance Off (Jennifer Lopez); Car Seat Headrest performed "Bodys"
869	May 10, 2018	Alex Rodriguez, Jamie Parker	Arctic Monkeys
Tonight Show #hashtags: #MomQuotes; Face Breakers (Alex Rodriguez); Alex Rodriguez leaves a baseball bat for Jamie Parker; Jamie Parker does a magic trick; Arctic Monkeys performed "Four Out of Five"
870	May 11, 2018	Julie Bowen, Justin Hartley	Dov Davidoff
Mother's Day Cards; Royal Family/Statue Quotes; Tonight Show The Big Question; Thank You Notes
871	May 14, 2018	Nathan Lane, Yara Shahidi	Kygo & Miguel
LeBron James Quotes; Jimmy Fallon, Ariana Grande & the Roots sing "No Tears Left to Cry" with computer-made instruments; Nathan Lane reads rules of the Tony Awards; Yara Shahidi raps; Tonight Show Mother Daughter Challenge (Yara & Carrie Shahidi); Kygo & Miguel performed "Remind Me to Forget"
872	May 15, 2018	Josh Brolin, Cedric the Entertainer, Dave Itzkoff	Chvrches
Tonight Show This Week in Memes; Cedric the Entertainer gives Jimmy a hat; Cedric the Entertainer introduces himself as "Cheerio"; Chvrches performed "Miracle"
873	May 16, 2018	Cord & Tish, Chrissy Metz	Florence and the Machine
Bernie Sanders Campaign Slogans; "Yanny/Laurel" Remix by the Roots; Tonight Show News & Improved; Cord & Tish bring a gift for the royal baby; Cord & Tish performed a song; Florence and the Machine performed "Hunger"
874	May 17, 2018	Tina Fey, Paul Bettany	Courtney Barnett
RSVP; Tonight Show #hashtags: #WeddingFail; What's Behind Me? (Tina Fey); Tina Fey reads letter to her future self; Courtney Barnett performed "Nameless, Faceless"
875	May 18, 2018	Sterling K. Brown, Willie Geist	Pete Lee
Royal Seating Chart; Thank You Notes; Tonight Show Dance Battle (Sterling K. Brown, Brian Tyree Henry)
876	May 21, 2018	Emilia Clarke, Matt Bomer	Summer: The Donna Summer Musical
Tonight Show Polls; Charades (Jimmy Fallon & Emilia Clarke Vs. Matt Bomer & Tariq); Emilia Clarke does Chewbacca impression; Summer: The Donna Summer Musical performed "MacArthur Park"
877	May 22, 2018	Sarah Paulson, Chris Hardwick, Danica Patrick	Foster the People
Miss Backup Ohio; Brandi Chastain/Plaque Quotes; Tonight Show Emotional Interview (Sarah Paulson); Danica Patrick and Jimmy have wine; Foster the People performed "Sit Next to Me"
878	May 23, 2018	Mindy Kaling, Andy Cohen	Lil Pump
President Obama Interview; Jinx (Andy Cohen & Jimmy Fallon Vs. Tariq & Mindy Kaling); Andy Cohen's birthday; Andy Cohen and Jimmy have pie; Lil Pump performed "Esskeetit"
879	May 24, 2018	Cate Blanchett, Guy Fieri	Darius Rucker
Service men and women in the audience; Walt Disney World Slogans; Cricket Commercial; Tonight Show #hashtags: #WorstAdviceEver; Jimmy taste tests burgers; Egg Russian Roulette (Cate Blanchett); Darius Rucker and Jimmy performed a rewriting of Only Wanna Be With You to honor the service men and women; Guy Fieri brings a burger out for Jimmy; Darius Rucker performed "For the First Time"
880	May 25, 2018	Julianna Margulies, Giancarlo Stanton	Dan White
Yamaneika Saunders; Tonight Show Superlatives; Thank You Notes (appearance by Giancarlo Stanton); Jimmy gives Julianna Margulies t-shirts; Giancarlo Stanton and Jimmy eat Kit Kats; Giancarlo Stanton takes an oath to the New York Yankees

=== June ===
No.	Original release date	Guest(s)	Musical/entertainment guest(s)
881	June 11, 2018	Jim Parsons, Marlon Wayans, Alexander Ovechkin & Braden Holtby	The Smashing Pumpkins
Trump Administration Quotes; Two Goats in a Boat (Jimmy and Lin-Manuel Miranda); Tariq raps; Jimmy gives Jim Parsons a cane; Alex Ovechkin, Braden Holtby, Mike E. Smith and Jimmy drink out of the Stanley Cup; The Smashing Pumpkins performed "Solara"
882	June 12, 2018	Jeremy Renner, Derek Hough, Mrs. Joanne Rogers	Christine and the Queens featuring Dâm-Funk
Questlove and Tariq re-enact a scene from The Bachelorette; Jimmy promotes the Jurassic Chomp Blizzard from Dairy Queen; Christine and the Queens featuring Dâm-Funk performed "Girlfriend"
883	June 13, 2018	John Travolta, Sophia Bush	Dierks Bentley
Trump Administration Quotes; Tonight Show #hashtags: #DinoSongs; John Travolta and Jimmy dance; Jurassic World: Fall in Pink Gum; Dierks Bentley performed "Burning Man"
884	June 14, 2018	Chris Pratt, Christina Aguilera	Christina Aguilera
Father's Day Cards; Jo Firestone; Christina Aguilera and Jimmy perform in the New York subway system; Box of Lies (Chris Pratt); Christina Aguilera performed "Fall in Line"
885	June 15, 2018	Jada Pinkett Smith, Bryce Dallas Howard	Nikki Glaser
That's My Dad; Thank You Notes; Bryce Dallas Howard and Jimmy create a dinosaur roar
886	June 18, 2018	Jared Leto, Alessia Cara	Alessia Cara
Office of the First Lady Quotes; Art Quotes; Marijuana Guide; Jimmy acknowledges the situation with immigrants in Mexico; Tonight Show News & Improved; Jared Leto brings Jimmy t-shirts; Jared Leto gives audience tickets to his band's concert; Tonight Show 30 Seconds To... (Jared Leto); Alessia Cara performed "Growing Pains"
887	June 19, 2018	Whoopi Goldberg, David Hogg & Lauren Hogg	Mike Shinoda
Cristiano Ronaldo/Statue Quotes; Tonight Show Do Not Play; Whoopi Goldberg brings Jimmy candy; Mike Shinoda performed "Crossing a Line"
888	June 20, 2018	Robert Pattinson, Pete Davidson	Brockhampton
Merged Companies; Play by Play; Tonight Show Kid Letters; Brockhampton performed "Tonya"
889	June 21, 2018	Michael Strahan, Dave Matthews	Dave Matthews Band
Tonight Show #hashtags: #SummerVacationFail; Dave Matthews Sings Trap Music (Dave Matthews performed original songs); Michael Strahan and Jimmy have tequila; Dave Matthews Band performed "Samurai Cop"
890	June 22, 2018	Seth Meyers, Dominic Cooper	Penn & Teller
Sea Creature Names; Streaming Service Quotes; Thank You Notes
891	June 25, 2018	Armie Hammer, Meghan Trainor, Rupi Kaur	Bebe Rexha
Tonight Show Popular Mathematics; Rupi Kaur reads poetry; Bebe Rexha performed "I'm a Mess"
892	June 26, 2018	Shaquille O'Neal, Jenna Dewan	Keith Urban
Jimmy chats with Stephen Colbert and Conan O'Brien about Donald Trump at the top of the program; Tonight Show This Week in Memes: World Cup Edition; Tonight Show Blow Your Mind (Shaquille O'Neal); Jenna Dewan and Jimmy dance; Keith Urban performed "Coming Home"
893	June 27, 2018	Ice Cube, Dale Earnhardt Jr.	The Internet
Julio Torres & Patti Harrison; Tonight Show Audience Suggestion Box (Jimmy makes "Bob Seger sounds", Dale Earnhardt Jr. and Jimmy have a cooler scooter race); The Internet performed "Come Over"
894	June 28, 2018	Amy Adams, Rob Reiner	Backstreet Boys
Fran Watts; Donald Trump Handshakes; Cottage Cheese Promo; Jimmy Fallon, Backstreet Boys & the Roots sing "I Want It That Way" with classroom instruments; Tonight Show Lip Flip (Amy Adams); Backstreet Boys performed "Don't Go Breaking My Heart"
895	June 29, 2018	Heidi Klum, Lakeith Stanfield	Taylor Tomlinson
Tonight Show Superlatives; Thank You Notes; Foosball (Heidi Klum)

=== July ===
No.	Original release date	Guest(s)	Musical/entertainment guest(s)
896	July 16, 2018	Jamie Foxx & Taron Egerton, Zoey Deutch	Mark Normand
Donald Trump Video; Tonight Show News & Improved; Taron Egerton performed a song; world premiere of Robin Hood trailer; Charades (Jamie Foxx & Taron Egerton Vs. Jimmy Fallon & Zoey Deutch)
897	July 17, 2018	David Spade, Lily James	Charlie Puth
Beer Slogans; Julio Torres; Charlie Puth sings 90s punk music; Tonight Show Whisper Challenge (Lily James); Charlie Puth performed "The Way I Am"
898	July 18, 2018	Amanda Seyfried, Daveed Diggs	Wiz Khalifa featuring Swae Lee
Audience member reads Donald Trump remark; Howard Schultz Campaign Slogans; Tonight Show #hashtags: #WorstSummerJob; Tonight Show Google Translate Songs (Amanda Seyfried); Wiz Khalifa featuring Swae Lee performed "Hopeless Romantic"
899	July 19, 2018	Pierce Brosnan, Deepak Chopra	Pusha T featuring 070 Shake
Donald Trump Poll; TNN; Freestylin' with the Roots; Deepak Chopra leads a meditation session
72018	July 20, 2018	Jamie Foxx & Taron Egerton, Zoey Deutch	Mark Normand
Thank You Notes; Charades (Jamie Foxx & Taron Egerton Vs. Jimmy Fallon & Zoey Deutch; Act 1 (monologue and Thank You Notes, app. 11 minutes) is original content, but remainder of show is repeat of episode 896, with slightly extended credits. Questlove mouths something in the opening theme but no show number can be heard. Episode is officially numbered 72018, and exists between episodes 899 and 900.
900	July 23, 2018	Tom Cruise, Parker Posey	Jorja Smith
Donald Trump Tweet; American Horror Story Season Titles; Aquaman Trailer; Tonight Show This Week in Memes; Jimmy gives Tom Cruise comedy albums; Tonight Show Mad Lib Theater (Tom Cruise); Parker Posey reads a passage from her book; Jorja Smith performed "February 3rd"
901	July 24, 2018	Amy Poehler, Harland Williams, Tomi Adeyemi	Ashley McBryde
TNN; Tonight Show Think Fast! (Amy Poehler); Ashley McBryde performed "American Scandal"
902	July 25, 2018	Alec Baldwin, Nikki & Brie Bella, Hannah Gadsby	Toots and the Maytals
Donald Trump Audio Recordings; Politician TV Cameos; Mission: Impossible – Fish in a Hospital; Toots and the Maytals performed "Funky Kingston"
903	July 26, 2018	Leslie Jones, Emily Ratajkowski	Greta Van Fleet
Joe Biden Campaign Slogans; Fake Headlines; Tonight Show Tweets with Beats; Ew! sketch (Britney Spears); Tonight Show #hashtags: #MyWeirdFear; Greta Van Fleet performed "When the Curtain Falls"
72718	July 27, 2018	Tom Cruise, Parker Posey	Jorja Smith
"I Don't Think So, Honey" with Matt and Bowen; Thank You Notes; Jimmy gives Tom Cruise comedy albums; Tonight Show Mad Lib Theater (Tom Cruise); Parker Posey reads a passage from her book; Jorja Smith performed "February 3rd"; Act 1 (monologue, I Don't Think So Honey, and Thank You Notes, 8 minutes) is original content, but remainder of show is repeat of episode 900, with two small segments originally edited out of Posey's interview restored and slightly extended credits. Episode is officially numbered 72718, and exists between episodes 903 and 904.
904	July 30, 2018	Mila Kunis, Zachary Quinto	Taylor Bennett
The Roots performed a comedy song; Photo Inner Thoughts; The Bachelorette Honest Subtitles; Jimmy announces the engagement of staff members; Tonight Show News & Improved; Say That to My Face (Mila Kunis & Jimmy Fallon Vs. Tariq & Zachary Quinto); Taylor Bennett performed "Rock 'N' Roll"
905	July 31, 2018	Bob Odenkirk, Alicia Silverstone	Kenny Chesney
Tariq shares his guacamole recipe; Tonight Show Summer Giveaway; TNN; Bob Odenkirk shows his tattoo; Bob Odenkirk shows his t-shirt and gives t-shirts to the audience; Kenny Chesney performed "Get Along"

=== August ===
No.	Original release date	Guest(s)	Musical/entertainment guest(s)
906	August 1, 2018	Kate McKinnon, Mo Rocca	Nicky Jam & J Balvin
Donald Trump Rally; Donald Trump Paintings; News for Shoes; Kate McKinnon raps Hungarian; Tonight Show Slow Turn Tiny Nod (Kate McKinnon); Mo Rocca and Jimmy have liverwurst sandwiches; Nicky Jam & J Balvin performed "Mi Gente/X"
907	August 2, 2018	Ray Romano, Lauren Miller Rogen	Leon Bridges
Lawsuits; Tonight Show Tweets with Beats; Tonight Show #hashtags: #MyWeirdBunkmate; Ray Romano does Jon Hamm impression; Tonight Show Wheel of Opinions (Ray Romano); Leon Bridges performed "Beyond"
80318	August 3, 2018	Alec Baldwin, Nikki & Brie Bella, Hannah Gadsby	Toots and the Maytals
Hacker or Rapper; Thank You Notes; Toots and the Maytals performed "Funky Kingston"; Act 1 (monologue, Hacker or Rapper, and Thank You Notes, app. 10 minutes) is original content, but remainder of show is repeat of episode 902, with two small segments edited out of Baldwin's and the Bellas' interviews. Episode is officially numbered 80318, and exists between episodes 907 and 908.
908	August 6, 2018	Glenn Close, Finn Wolfhard	Lauv
Tonight Show Between the Lines; Tonight Show Pup Quiz (Glenn Close, Finn Wolfhard); Jimmy gives Finn Wolfhard a vinyl record; Lauv performed "I Like Me Better"
909	August 7, 2018	Seth Rogen, Spike Lee	Big Boi
Tonight Show You Missed the Point; Ron Estes Campaign Ad; TNN; Tonight Show Dramatic Dad Texts (Seth Rogen); Big Boi performed "All Night"
910	August 8, 2018	Ryan Seacrest, Ruby Rose	Rae Sremmurd
Putin/Trump Discussion Topics; Donald Trump Tweets; Tonight Show #hashtags: #WhyImSingle; Ryan Seacrest throws into commercial; Catchphrase (Ryan Seacrest & Tariq Vs. Jimmy Fallon & Andy Cohen); Rae Sremmurd performed "Guatemala"
911	August 9, 2018	Rose Byrne, Brad Paisley	Brad Paisley
Donald Trump/Staff Quotes; Tonight Show Tweets with Beats; GE Tonight Show Fallonventions: Kid's Inventions; Eye to Eye (Rose Byrne); Brad Paisley performed an unreleased song; Brad Paisley performed "Water"
912	August 13, 2018	Ryan Reynolds, Chris O'Dowd	August Greene
Steve Higgins' birthday; Tonight Show Gifs; Ryan Reynolds brings out cocktails; Drinko (Ryan Reynolds); August Greene performed "No Apologies"
913	August 14, 2018	Milo Ventimiglia, Rhett and Link	YG featuring Big Sean & 2 Chainz
TNN; Will It Hummus? (Rhett and Link); Rhett and Link and Jimmy do a three-way pose; YG featuring Big Sean & 2 Chainz performed "Big Bank"
914	August 15, 2018	Michael Che & Colin Jost, Henry Golding, Justin Thomas	Dusty Slay
Jimmy and the Roots debate how to pronounce Omarosa; Melania Trump Outfits; Dog Fails; Tonight Show Deep Issues, Deep Tissues; Most Likely To (Michael Che & Colin Jost); Face Breakers (Justin Thomas)
915	August 16, 2018	Ariana Grande, Nick Kroll	Aerosmith
Ariana Grande pays tribute to Aretha Franklin ("You Make Me Feel Like a Natural Woman"); Tonight Show Tweets with Beats; Jimmy acknowledges death of Aretha Franklin; Jimmy announces September Central Park show; Ariana Grande meets fans; Ariana Grande performed "R.E.M."; Aerosmith performed "Mama Kin"
916	August 17, 2018	Jennifer Lopez, Finn Wolfhard	Janet Jackson with Daddy Yankee
Jimmy and the Roots do Robert De Niro impressions; Blended News Stories; Thank You Notes; Dance Break Interview (Jennifer Lopez); Wolfhard's interview rebroadcast from episode 908; Janet Jackson with Daddy Yankee performed "Made for Now"

=== September ===
No.	Original release date	Guest(s)	Musical/entertainment guest(s)
917	September 4, 2018	Ethan Hawke, Lil Rel Howery	Meek Mill featuring Jeremih & PnB Rock
Guess the New Bachelor's Name (with Lil Rel Howery); Tonight Show News & Improved; Ethan Hawke and Jimmy perform as Willie Nelson and Johnny Cash; Meek Mill featuring Jeremih & PnB Rock performed "Dangerous"
918	September 5, 2018	Jennifer Garner, Jeff Foxworthy	Sheryl Crow
Donald Trump discusses Fear: Trump in the White House; Ariana Grande's Ponytail Has a Mind of Its Own; Jinx Challenge (Jennifer Garner); Jeff Foxworthy shows Jimmy how to play his card game; Sheryl Crow performed "Wouldn't Want to Be Like You"
919	September 6, 2018	Paul McCartney, Kendall Jenner	Paul McCartney
Paul McCartney, Kendall Jenner and Jimmy dance in cold open; Tonight Show Stats; Paul McCartney and Jimmy Surprise Fans at 30 Rockefeller Plaza Elevators; Paul McCartney leaves a voicemail at Jimmy's childhood phone number; Paul McCartney performed "Come On to Me"
920	September 7, 2018	Nick Jonas, Elizabeth Olsen	Nick Jonas & Robin Schulz
Tonight Show Talk Like Trump; Tonight Show Tweets with Beats; Lip Sync Conversation (Nick Jonas); Thank You Notes; Nick Jonas takes the "What Jonas Brother Are You?" Buzzfeed Quiz; Nick Jonas & Robin Schulz performed "Right Now"
921	September 10, 2018	Maya Rudolph & Fred Armisen, Brian Tyree Henry, Senator Cory Booker	Sam Morril
Starbucks Ad; audience members get free iPhone and free service; Maya Rudolph, Fred Armisen and Jimmy play games
922	September 11, 2018	Matthew McConaughey	Future
John F. Kelly/Bob Woodward Quotes; Beto O'Rourke/Ted Cruz Questions; Board Games; Tonight Show True Confessions (Matthew McConaughey, Tariq); Future performed "31 Days"
923	September 12, 2018	Daniel Radcliffe, Matt Czuchry	Teyana Taylor
Marc Reeves; audience gets invited to tomorrow's show in Central Park; Jimmy Fallon, Aerosmith & the Roots sing "Walk This Way" with classroom instruments; Tonight Show #hashtags: #WhyIGotFired; Teyana Taylor performed "Gonna Love Me/A Rose in Harlem"
924	September 13, 2018	Blake Lively, Carrie Underwood	Carrie Underwood
New York Philharmonic sits in with the Roots; Map of Central Park; Justin Bieber and Jimmy photobomb people in Central Park; Tonight Show Name That Song Challenge (Blake Lively & Jimmy Fallon Vs. Carrie Underwood & Henry Golding); Carrie Underwood performed "Love Wins"; Note: With this broadcast, The Tonight Show became the first late-night talk show in history to film an episode in Central Park
925	September 17, 2018	Reese Witherspoon, Lenny Kravitz	Lenny Kravitz
Voting Schoolhouse Rock! Parody; Lip Sync Charades (Jimmy Fallon & Reese Witherspoon Vs. Lenny & Zoë Kravitz); Lenny Kravitz performed "Low"
926	September 18, 2018	Queen Latifah, Kelly Clarkson	Tony Bennett & Diana Krall
Tonight Show Talk Like Trump; Tonight Show This Week in Memes; Kelly Clarkson, Queen Latifah and Jimmy use the Loopy app; Tony Bennett & Diana Krall performed "'S Wonderful"
927	September 19, 2018	Kevin Hart, Robert Irwin	N/A
Kevin Hart co-hosts; Kevin Hart makes an appearance during the monologue; Kevin Hart and Jimmy call Dwayne Johnson; Jimmy's birthday; Kevin Hart gives Jimmy a birthday gift; Kevin Hart does Jerry Seinfeld impression; Kevin Hart and Jimmy go to a high school; Slapjack (Kevin Hart)
928	September 20, 2018	Jack Black, Angela Bassett	Josh Groban
Tonight Show Tweets with Beats; Tonight Show #hashtags: #MyWeirdRoommate; Jack Black plays sax-a-boom; Tonight Show Kid Theater (Jack Black); Josh Groban performed "River"
929	September 21, 2018	Chrissy Teigen, Ryan Eggold	Dan White
Chrissy Teigen makes an appearance at the top of the program; The Roots performed "September"; Thank You Notes; Tonight Show Loaded Questions (Chrissy Teigen); Chrissy Teigen brings patty melts and has the audience try them
930	September 24, 2018	Mandy Moore, John David Washington, Marcus Mumford	Mumford & Sons
Tonight Show News & Improved; Mandy Moore guesses quotes from her work; Tonight Show Whisper Challenge (Mandy Moore); Mumford & Sons performed "Guiding Light"
931	September 25, 2018	Taraji P. Henson, BTS	BTS
Mandy Moore makes an appearance at the top of the program; Trump Filters; Emoji Filters; Tonight Show Talk Like Trump; Things More Popular Than a Kavanaugh Confirmation; YouTube Definitions; BTS and Jimmy do the Fortnite Dance Challenge; Tonight Show 5–Second Summaries (Taraji P. Henson); BTS performed "Idol"
932	September 26, 2018	Alexander Skarsgård, Justin Hartley	Bad Bunny
Tariq and Jimmy talk about coffee during the monologue; Shortened Company Names; Tonight Show #hashtags: #MyFamilyIsWeird; Alexander Skarsgård teaches Jimmy the Swedish Midsummer Dance; Justin Hartley makes up his own This Is Us spoilers; Bad Bunny performed "Estamos Bien"
933	September 27, 2018	Ricky Gervais, Shawn Mendes	Shawn Mendes
Ricky Gervais makes an appearance at the top of the program; In Lighter News; Tonight Show Heads and Tails; Slay It, Don't Spray It (Shawn Mendes); Shawn Mendes performed "Lost in Japan"
934	September 28, 2018	Paul Giamatti, Common	Shin Lim
Donald Trump Video; Things That Are Changin' at Dunkin'; Blended News Stories; Tonight Show Tweets with Beats (appearance by Common); Thank You Notes

=== October ===
No.	Original release date	Guest(s)	Musical/entertainment guest(s)
935	October 1, 2018	Megan Mullally & Nick Offerman, Post Malone	The National
Republican Quotes; Donald Trump Quotes; Tonight Show Do Not Play; Nick Offerman dances; Tonight Show G'readings (Megan Mullally & Nick Offerman); Post Malone previews "Sunflower"; The National performed "Dark Side of the Gym"
936	October 2, 2018	Claire Foy, Chelsea Clinton, Lil Wayne	Lil Wayne
Tonight Show Face Off: Trump Edition; Bad Film Reviews; Tonight Show Gifs; Lil Wayne performed "Dedicate"
937	October 3, 2018	Bradley Cooper, Kathryn Hahn	Jim James
Crossword Answers; News for Snooze; Donald Trump Video; Tonight Show Deep Issues, Deep Tissues; Jimmy does voices; Jim James performed "Over and Over"
938	October 4, 2018	Billy Crystal, Gisele Bündchen	Quavo
U.S. Citizenship Test; Steve Higgins' Vision; Blended News Stories; Tonight Show #hashtags: #MyTeacherIsWeird; Catchphrase (Billy Crystal & Gisele Bündchen Vs. Jimmy Fallon & Quavo); Gisele Bündchen leads a meditation session; Quavo performed "Lamb Talk/Workin' Me"
939	October 5, 2018	Mark Ruffalo & Student Organizers from March for Our Lives, Travis Scott	Jaboukie Young-White
Full Disclosure Audio Book Auditions; Tonight Show Superlatives; Thank You Notes; Travis Scott samples Jamba Juice
940	October 8, 2018	Anthony Anderson, Shaquille O'Neal	Dinah Jane featuring Ty Dolla $ign & Marc E. Bassy
Donald Trump Show Appearances; Tonight Show Goodnight News; Ray Angry sits in with the Roots; Jimmy Fallon, Shawn Mendes & the Roots sing "Treat You Better" with classroom instruments; Tonight Show Kid Letters (appearance by Shaquille O'Neal); Anthony Anderson sings opera; Shaquille O'Neal and Jimmy do the chicken dance and have fried chicken sandwiches; Dinah Jane featuring Ty Dolla $ign & Marc E. Bassy performed "Bottled Up"
941	October 9, 2018	John Cena, Maggie Gyllenhaal	H.E.R.
Tonight Show Talk Like Trump; A Message from President Obama; Jimmy promotes Mastercard; John Cena shows Jimmy a fighting move; Tonight Show G'readings (John Cena); Box of Lies (John Cena); H.E.R. performed "As I Am"
942	October 10, 2018	Timothée Chalamet, Amandla Stenberg, Guy Raz	Ella Mai
Audience Google Search History; Romantic Horse Films; Tonight Show #hashtags: #HomecomingFail; Ella Mai performed "Trip"
943	October 11, 2018	Jonah Hill, Charles Barkley	Bazzi
Internet Bill of Rights; In Lighter News; Jimmy and Post Malone Go to Olive Garden; Shaquille O'Neal asks Charles Barkley a question; Bazzi performed "Beautiful"
944	October 12, 2018	Alec Baldwin, Meghan Trainor	LeClerc Andre
Trump Administration Accomplishments; Blended News Stories; Tonight Show Superlatives; Thank You Notes; Alec Baldwin challenges his wife to a push-up contest; Tonight Show One Word Songs (Meghan Trainor)
945	October 22, 2018	Savannah Guthrie & Hoda Kotb, Juliette Lewis	Joey Purp featuring RZA
Trump Administration Audio Recording; Alabama Face Guy; Tonight Show News & Improved; Tonight Show Wheel of Musical Impressions (Melissa Villaseñor); Hoda Kotb does karaoke and twirls a basketball; Joey Purp featuring RZA performed "Godbody Pt. 2"
946	October 23, 2018	Trevor Noah, Lucas Hedges, Gigi Hadid	Brockhampton
Donald Trump Outtakes; Tonight Show Polls; Gigi Hadid brings Jimmy mini bags; debut of Gigi Hadid's fashion line; Gigi Hadid and Jimmy have burgers; Brockhampton performed "District"
947	October 24, 2018	Greg Kinnear, Paul Dano	Hozier featuring Mavis Staples
State Propositions; Tonight Show Um, Maybe Don't?; Tonight Show Goodnight News; Freestylin' with the Roots; Hozier featuring Mavis Staples performed "Nina Cried Power"
948	October 25, 2018	Tiffany Haddish, Steve Kornacki	Buddy
Trump Filters; Andrew Karn; Tonight Show #hashtags: #IfIWonTheLottery; Lip Sync Battle (Tiffany Haddish); Buddy performed "Trouble on Central"
949	October 26, 2018	Whoopi Goldberg, Nikki & Brie Bella	Joshua Jay
Combined Candidates; Super Mario Bros.: Pope Edition; Tonight Show Superlatives; The Shining Parody (Nikki & Brie Bella); Thank You Notes; Whoopi Goldberg brings cookies; Whoopi Goldberg debuts her new holiday sweaters; Tiffany Haddish makes a surprise appearance during Whoopi Goldberg's interview; Nikki & Brie Bella thumb wrestle
950	October 29, 2018	Rami Malek, Chrissy Metz	John Prine
In Lighter News; Jimmy acknowledges the Pittsburgh synagogue shooting; Tonight Show This Week in Memes; Tonight Show A to Z (Rami Malek); John Prine performed "When I Get to Heaven"
951	October 30, 2018	Tyler Perry, Abbi Jacobson	KISS
Tariq is a fan of Jeopardy!; Banana Messages; Donald Trump Halloween Address; Jimmy interviews KISS; Abbi Jacobson flicks guitar picks at the audience; KISS performed "Love Gun"
952	October 31, 2018	Mike D & Ad-Rock, Desus & Mero	Sheck Wes
Donald Trump Message; Mix Master Mike sits in with the Roots; Tonight Show #hashtags: #WeirdestHalloweenEver; Jimmy gives Mike D & Ad-Rock birthday gifts; Sheck Wes performed "Mo Bamba"

=== November ===
No.	Original release date	Guest(s)	Musical/entertainment guest(s)
953	November 1, 2018	Justin Timberlake, Sunny Suljic	Pistol Annies
U.S. Senate Candidate Closing Statements; Tonight Show The Big Question; Tonight Show Slow Turn Tiny Nod (Justin Timberlake); Jessica Biel makes a surprise appearance; Best Friends Challenge (Jessica Biel, Justin Timberlake); Sunny Suljic skateboards; Pistol Annies performed "Best Years of My Life"
954	November 2, 2018	Benedict Cumberbatch, Minka Kelly	Orlando Leyba
Tonight Show News Break Dance Break; Jimmy performed a song for baby named after Colonel Sanders; Blended News Stories; Tonight Show Superlatives; Thank You Notes (Hot Sax); Benedict Cumberbatch does Hot Sax; Try Not to Laugh Challenge (Benedict Cumberbatch)
955	November 5, 2018	Rachel Maddow, Sam Heughan	Carly Rae Jepsen
Stickers; Republican Candidate/Audience Member Quotes; Candidate Closing Statements; Dr. Evil Interview (appearance by Mike Myers); Jimmy announces the Sexiest Man Alive (appearance by Idris Elba); Tonight Show Midterm Election Update (with Rachel Maddow); Carly Rae Jepsen performed "Party for One"
956	November 7, 2018	Eddie Redmayne, Jack Whitehall, Chuck Todd	Lauren Daigle
Ron Wybrow; Tariq's Cat Corner sketch was cut (Tariq and Jimmy performed a song); Eddie Redmayne brings wands and shows Jimmy how to use them; Eddie Redmayne does a magic trick; Lauren Daigle performed "Look Up Child"
957	November 8, 2018	Emma Stone, Bridget Everett	Finesse Mitchell
Jimmy welcomes a mandarin duck to New York; Blended News Stories; Jimmy acknowledges the Thousand Oaks shooting; Jimmy uses TikTok app; Tonight Show #hashtags: #WhyImAGrinch; Emma Stone takes a BuzzFeed quiz; Jimmy plays with his pens; Bridget Everett performed "Only Girl in the World"
958	November 9, 2018	Mark Wahlberg, Chip & Joanna Gaines	Zac Brown Band
Mark Wahlberg and Jimmy acknowledge and welcome the service men and women in the audience and at the taping at the top of the program; Travel Journal; Tonight Show Stats; Thank You Notes; T-Mobile's commitment to hiring and supporting the military is highlighted; Troops in Afghanistan send love and support to veterans watching the program; T-Mobile Presents: Audience Whisper Challenge: Veterans Day Edition (special appearance by deployed husband of participant, T-Mobile pays for entirety of project by participant and special appearance by the family's kids); Mark Wahlberg and Paramount Pictures give the audience a special advance screening of Instant Family after the taping; Chip & Joanna Gaines meet with the family from the previous segment; Chip & Joanna Gaines announce their return to television; Zac Brown Band gives audience tickets to their Down the Rabbit Hole Live tour; Zac Brown Band performed "Someone I Used to Know"
959	November 12, 2018	Jamie Foxx, Troye Sivan	Charli XCX & Troye Sivan
Barack Obama Interview; Spooky Spider; Tonight Show Reel–y Fast Trailer Recaps; Jimmy signs Justin Timberlake's book and gives it to audience member; Jimmy is the voice of Amazon Echo for jokes; Jamie Foxx brings out a spray bottle; The Roots disappear; Charli XCX & Troye Sivan performed "1999"
960	November 13, 2018	Viola Davis, Wyatt Russell	Muse
Donald Trump Video; Steve Higgins and James Poyser stretch; Happy World Kindness Day; Tonight Show Trump Magic 8 Ball; Tonight Show Challenges: #TumbleweedChallenge; Tonight Show R. C. Pro–Am (NASCAR Championship Four); Jimmy does a pit-stop; Muse performed "Pressure"
961	November 14, 2018	Michael Shannon, Ashley Graham	The Struts & Kesha
Jimmy plays guitar and performed an original song; Tonight Show Talk Like Trump; Tonight Show Gifs; Tonight Show Midnight Snacks; Ashley Graham and Jimmy do a real-life gif; Ashley Graham teaches Jimmy the runway walk; The Struts & Kesha performed "Body Talks"
962	November 15, 2018	Steve Carell, Eric Bana	Troye Sivan
How Did They Get There?; Court Recording; Tonight Show Tweets with Beats; Tonight Show Challenges: #SharpieChallenge; Tonight Show #hashtags: #TurkeyDayTradition; Tonight Show Name Drop (Steve Carell); Jimmy reads Michelle Obama's new book; Troye Sivan performed "Revelation"
963	November 16, 2018	Benicio del Toro, Mariah Carey	Mariah Carey featuring Ty Dolla $ign
The This Guy Gets It Song; Tonight Show Superlatives; That Time Kris Kringle Called; Thank You Notes; Mariah Carey featuring Ty Dolla $ign performed "The Distance"
964	November 19, 2018	Mahershala Ali, Chris Colfer, Blake Mycoskie	Michael Bublé
Jimmy and the Roots are excited for Thanksgiving; Congressmen/women Icebreakers; Tonight Show News & Improved; Michael Bublé performed "When You're Smiling"
965	November 20, 2018	Michael Strahan, Michael Angarano	Takeoff
Tonight Show Goodnight News; Tonight Show Challenges; Charades (Michael Strahan & Michael Angarano Vs. Jimmy Fallon & Tariq); Michael Strahan and Jimmy do push-ups; Jimmy reads This Is Us theories; Takeoff performed "Last Memory"
966	November 21, 2018	Tim Allen, Sophia the Robot & Tonight ShowBotics	Meek Mill
Black Friday Slogans; Balloon Quotes; Trump Filters; Tonight Show Before & After; Tonight Show #hashtags: #TurkeyRaps; Tonight ShowBotics; Meek Mill performed "Oodles o' Noodles Babies"
967	November 22, 2018	Jerry Seinfeld, Brian Regan, Robert Irwin	N/A
Jerry Seinfeld makes an appearance at the top of the program; Jerry Seinfeld does part of the monologue; Thank You Notes; Bob Dylan and Jimmy visit the Big Apple Circus
968	November 26, 2018	Glenn Close, Phoebe Robinson	Blood Orange
Passenger Quotes; Jimmy and the Roots add on to monologue joke; News to Brews; Tonight Show Popular Mathematics; Jimmy gives Glenn Close a basket of cookies; Tonight Show 5–Second Summaries (Glenn Close); Blood Orange performed "Charcoal Baby"
969	November 27, 2018	John Oliver, Rachel Brosnahan	Mike Will Made It featuring Swae Lee & Young Thug
Congressmen Icebreakers; Jimmy performs as Donald Trump as Elvis Presley; Tonight Show Audience Suggestion Box (Mark Kelley follows Mark Wahlberg's daily schedule, Jimmy throws a paper airplane and hits John Oliver, Jimmy turns the lights on the Christmas tree in Rockefeller Plaza on and off, Jimmy gives a random act of kindness to a couple in the audience); Mike Will Made It featuring Swae Lee & Young Thug performed "Fate"
970	November 28, 2018	Ice-T & Mariska Hargitay, Macaulay Culkin	JID featuring BJ the Chicago Kid & Thundercat
Rockefeller Center Vs. The White House; World Leader Statements; Senator Quotes; Tonight Show Virtual Reality Pictionary (Ice-T & Mariska Hargitay Vs. Jimmy Fallon & Macaulay Culkin); Macaulay Culkin and Jimmy wear bunny ears; J.I.D featuring BJ the Chicago Kid & Thundercat performed "Skrawberries"
971	November 29, 2018	Claire Foy, Mike Birbiglia	Jourdain Fisher
Jimmy performed an original song; Tonight Show Audience Memojis: Trump Edition; Tonight Show #hashtags: #AirportFail; Claire Foy performed "Rapper's Delight"; Jimmy auditions to be Mike Birbiglia's understudy
972	November 30, 2018	Dolly Parton, Nick Kroll	Dolly Parton
World Leader Quotes; Tonight Show Stats; Thank You Notes; Dolly Parton and Jimmy performed a medley of Christmas songs; Nick Kroll does voices; Dolly Parton performed "Girl in the Movies"

=== December ===
No.	Original release date	Guest(s)	Musical/entertainment guest(s)
973	December 3, 2018	Margot Robbie, Elsie Fisher	Hootie & the Blowfish
Doug & Nate West; Jimmy and Tariq fight over how to pronounce gif; Tonight Show Loaded Questions (Margot Robbie); Hootie & the Blowflish performed "Only Wanna Be with You"
974	December 4, 2018	Saoirse Ronan, Russell Westbrook	Alessia Cara
Politician Job Applications; Tonight Show Talk Like Trump; Tonight Show This Week in Memes; Charades (Jimmy Fallon & Saoirse Ronan Vs. Alessia Cara & Anderson Paak); Jimmy quizzes Saoirse Ronan on Bridesmaids; Margot Robbie has a question for Saoirse Ronan; Saoirse Ronan and Jimmy performed "Fairytale of New York"; Russell Westbrook signs shoes and gives them to audience member; Alessia Cara performed "Out of Love"
975	December 5, 2018	Andy Cohen, John Legend	John Legend
Roger Stone Outfit Sayings; Textbook Vs. YouTube; Tonight Show 12 Days of Christmas Sweaters; Poetry Slam the News; Jimmy gives Andy Cohen a hat; John Legend performed "What Christmas Means to Me/Bring Me Love"
976	December 6, 2018	Jason Momoa, J. K. Simmons	Joe Machi
This Day In History; Supreme Court Justice Inner Thoughts; Tariq's segment gets cut and he performed an original song; Tonight Show Challenges; Tonight Show #hashtags: #DecorationDisaster; Tonight Show 12 Days of Christmas Sweaters; Target Practice (Jason Momoa)
977	December 7, 2018	Ice Cube, Amber Heard, Elvis Duran	Ice Cube
Tonight Show Superlatives; Thank You Notes; Tonight Show 12 Days of Christmas Sweaters; Spicy Bite Challenge (Amber Heard); Elvis Duran does a 12 on 12 interview with Jimmy; Ice Cube performed "That New Funkadelic"
978	December 10, 2018	John Mulaney, Vanessa Hudgens	Grimes
Facial Recognition; Jimmy, the Roots and the cast of The Voice sing a cappella versions of their hits (appearance by Adam Levine, Kelly Clarkson, Jennifer Hudson, Blake Shelton and Carson Daly); Tonight Show 12 Days of Christmas Sweaters; Grimes performed "We Appreciate Power"
979	December 11, 2018	Jennifer Lopez, Robert Klein	J Balvin
White House Chief of Staff Job Application; Who Wants to Be Trump's Chief of Staff?; Tonight Show Singing in the Street; Tonight Show 12 Days of Christmas Sweaters; Tonight Show Can You Feel It? (Jennifer Lopez, Milo Ventimiglia); Jimmy gives Robert Klein a framed plague commemorating his fifty years of Tonight Show appearances; J Balvin performed "Reggaeton"
980	December 12, 2018	Natalie Portman, Dennis Miller	Braison Cyrus
Andrew Karn; Tonight Show 12 Days of Christmas Sweaters; Tonight Show Jinx Challenge (Natalie Portman); Braison Cyrus performed "I'll Never Leave You"
981	December 13, 2018	Miley Cyrus, Regina King	Chloe x Halle
Chief of Staff Excuse Generator; Tonight Show Tweets with Beats; Tonight Show 12 Days of Christmas Sweaters (appearance by Matt Damon); Tonight Show Name That Song Challenge (Miley Cyrus); Miley Cyrus gives audience $100 at Converse; Chloe x Halle performed "Down"
982	December 14, 2018	Armie Hammer, Mark Ronson	Pete Lee
Sarah Huckabee Sanders Quotes; Tonight Show Superlatives; Tonight Show 12 Days of Christmas Sweaters; Thank You Notes
983	December 17, 2018	Lin-Manuel Miranda, Tyler "Ninja" Blevins	Black Thought featuring Salaam Remi
Hacked Audience Members; Tonight Show 12 Days of Christmas Sweaters; Lin-Manuel Miranda and Jimmy sing holiday song parodies; Jimmy announces a taping in Puerto Rico on January 15, 2019; Tyler "Ninja" Blevins gives Jimmy a headband and teaches him a dance; Black Thought featuring Salaam Remi performed "Conception"
984	December 18, 2018	Michelle Obama	Ariana Grande
Jimmy, Chris Kattan, Horatio Sanz, Tracy Morgan and Ariana Grande performed "I Wish It Was Christmas Today" at the top of the program; Tonight Show Goodnight News; Jimmy acknowledges the death of Penny Marshall; Michelle Obama and Jimmy surprise 30 Rockefeller Plaza visitors; Tonight Show 12 Days of Christmas Sweaters (audience member receives $100,000 towards college funds for her daughters from Barbie); Ariana Grande performed "Imagine"
985	December 19, 2018	Willem Dafoe, Hailee Steinfeld	Hailee Steinfeld
Prison Sentences; Jack Blankenship; Lawmaker Icebreakers; Tonight Show 12 Days of Christmas Sweaters; Tonight Show Beat Battle (Hailee Steinfeld); Hailee Steinfeld performed "Back to Life"
986	December 20, 2018	Felicity Jones, Jimmy Carr	Bebe Rexha
Celebrity Holiday Greeting Cards; Trump Filters; Blended News Stories; Tonight Show #hashtags: #AllIWantForChristmasIs; Tonight Show 12 Days of Christmas Sweaters (appearance by the Radio City Rockettes); Miley Cyrus performed a parody of "Santa Baby" (appearance by Mark Ronson); Armie Hammer has a question for Felicity Jones; Felicity Jones does "Single Ladies (Put a Ring on It)" dance moves; Jimmy Carr and Jimmy have Lucky Charms with Baileys Irish Cream; Bebe Rexha performed "Knees"
987	December 21, 2018	Best of 2018 Special	N/A
Best Moments from The Tonight Show in 2018
