= Dan White (magician) =

American magician

- Born: July 24, 1981 (age 44); Philadelphia, Pennsylvania
- Education: St. Joseph's Preparatory School
- Occupation: Magician

Daniel White (born July 24, 1981) is an American magician, producer, and creative consultant. In March 2015, White began performing a headline show produced by Theory11 at The NoMad Hotel in New York City, titled "The Magician at The NoMad." The critically acclaimed show has been featured in Vanity Fair, Wall Street Journal, and 12 times on The Tonight Show with Jimmy Fallon.

== Early life ==
White was born in Philadelphia, Pennsylvania and moved to New York City in 2002. He first became interested in magic at the age of 10 when his father showed him an old poster of the magician Harry Kellar. However, in an interview with theory11, he is reported to have said his interest was sparked by his father giving him a magic set. While growing up in Philadelphia, White fed his interest by working in a local magic store and was influenced by the older generation of magicians he would come into contact with daily. White has a master's degree in art history.

=== Accomplishments ===
White produced the magic for David Blaine's 2 hour ABC Special "Drowned Alive" (2006) and was the Head Magic Producer for Blaine's 2008 Prime Time television special "Dive of Death." In 2011, White produced the magic at the iHeartRadio Festival in Las Vegas for Target's Mobile Division Launch.

Between 2011 and 2012, White worked in Las Vegas as magic producer for David Copperfield at the MGM Grand Resort & Casino.

In 2011, White starred in "The Supernaturalist" for the Discovery Channel in which he traveled to places such as Nepal to learn more about other cultures views of magic. The program was produced by Ping Ping Productions and Casey Brumels was the executive producer.

A review in The Examiner expressed an opinion that the show was probably the best magic TV show since David Blaine's show, Magic Man. Though the review also comments on The Supernaturalist's story possibly being predetermined and staged.

In 2012, White, in collaboration with global magic collective theory11, helped to create magic for the presentation of the new menu for Eleven Madison Park Restaurant in New York City. The collaboration was featured in The New York Times and New Yorker Magazine to positive reception. Eleven Madison Park was since ranked 5th Best Restaurant in the World by San Pellegrino in 2013.

In 2012, White worked alongside David Copperfield's creative team to create and design the "Hangman Illusion" for the Warner Brothers motion picture The Incredible Burt Wonderstone.

White was prominently featured in a Hewlett-Packard television advertisement in 2013.

His show, "White Magic," premiered on December 25, 2013, on the Travel Channel.

In 2013, White was the illusion consultant and creative consultant for Kanye West's The Yeezus Tour.

In 2015 and 2016, White performed three times in separate appearances on The Tonight Show with Jimmy Fallon.

== High-profile performances ==
White has performed alongside David Blaine and in 2011 he worked in Las Vegas as a creative consultant for him. White's official website claims that he performed at P.Diddy's white party in 2007. He has also been photographed performing magic tricks at the Victoria's Secrets Fashion Show 2008 and for Kim Kardashian and Reggie Bush. In 2013, White appeared on the Kris Jenner Show and he performed a number of card tricks. He's appeared on The Tonight Show with Jimmy Fallon 12 times since 2015.

His show at The NoMad has featured guests such as Neil Patrick Harris, Kanye West, Kim Kardashian, Jimmy Fallon, Questlove, Aziz Ansari, Stefanie Schaefer, Aaron Paul, Carly Rome, Allison Williams, Jacob Tremblay, and Jesse Eisenberg.
