= List of The Tonight Show Starring Jimmy Fallon episodes (2014) =

- No. of episodes: 186

Release
- Original network: NBC
- Original release: February 17 – December 23, 2014

Season chronology
- ← Previous Next → 2015 episodes

This is the list of episodes for The Tonight Show Starring Jimmy Fallon in 2014. The first episode premiered on February 17, 2014.

== 2014 ==
=== February ===
No.	Original release date	Guest(s)	Musical/entertainment guest(s)
1	February 17, 2014	Will Smith	U2
Tonight Show Superlatives (Winter Olympic Athletes); $100 Bet (Robert De Niro, Tina Fey, Joe Namath, Rudy Giuliani, Mariah Carey, Tracy Morgan, Joan Rivers, Kim Kardashian, Seth Rogen, Lindsay Lohan, Sarah Jessica Parker, Mike Tyson, Lady Gaga, Stephen Colbert); The Evolution of Hip-Hop Dancing with Will Smith; U2 performed "Invisible" atop the GE Building and an acoustic version of "Ordinary Love", assisted by The Roots
2	February 18, 2014	Jerry Seinfeld, Kristen Wiig	Lady Gaga
Jamie Anderson appeared during the monologue; Questlove and Tariq re-enact a scene from The Bachelor; The Ragtime Gals performed "Ignition (Remix)" by R. Kelly; Pros & Cons: Competing In the Winter Olympics; Jerry Seinfeld did a stand-up comedy bit; Kristen Wiig appeared as Harry Styles; Lady Gaga performed "Artpop"
3	February 19, 2014	Bradley Cooper	Tim McGraw
Brian Williams and Lester Holt rap "Rapper's Delight" video; #Hashtag2 (Jonah Hill & Martin Scorsese); Charades (Jimmy Fallon & Tim McGraw Vs. Bradley Cooper & Emma Thompson); GE Tonight Show Fallonventions: Kid's Inventions; Tim McGraw performed "Shotgun Rider"
4	February 20, 2014	First Lady Michelle Obama, Will Ferrell	Arcade Fire
Olympic Thoughts; Ew! sketch (Will Ferrell, Michelle Obama); Will Ferrell's Olympic figure skating routine; Arcade Fire performed "Afterlife"
5	February 21, 2014	Justin Timberlake	Justin Timberlake
Thank You Notes (Rob Ford, Olympic Curling Icon Guy, Bob Costas's Red Eyes, Plane Emergency Row, Pillsbury Doughboy, Eric and Sadie Bjornsen, Biathlon, Ceiling Fans); History of Rap 5 with Justin Timberlake; Justin Timberlake performed "Not a Bad Thing"
6	February 24, 2014	Reese Witherspoon, Fred Armisen	Rick Ross
Tonight Show Superlatives (2014 NASCAR Drivers); Never-before-seen footage of The Beatles' first performance on The Ed Sullivan Show (with Fred Armisen); Catchphrase (Jimmy Fallon & Usher Vs. Reese Witherspoon & Mikaela Shiffrin); Rick Ross performed "The Devil Is a Lie"
7	February 25, 2014	Paul Rudd, Shaquille O'Neal	Hannibal Buress
Pros & Cons: Watching the Oscars; Lip Sync Battle (Paul Rudd)
8	February 26, 2014	Drew Barrymore & Adam Sandler	Dierks Bentley
Questlove and Tariq re-enact a scene from The Bachelor; HFL Heterosexual Football Rules; Tonight Show Audience Suggestion Box (appearance by John Moschitta, Jr., Rik's Reality Rap-Up); Adam Sandler and Drew Barrymore performed the "Every 10 Years" song; Dierks Bentley performed "I Hold On"
9	February 27, 2014	Denzel Washington, Shaun White	Sara Bareilles
Tariq and Jimmy's Inner Thoughts; Tonight Show #hashtags: #misheardlyrics; Waste Paper Basketball music video (appearance by LeBron James); Sara Bareilles performed "I Choose You (Sara Bareilles song)"
10	February 28, 2014	Cameron Diaz, Ralph Fiennes, Mario Batali	N/A
Thank You Notes (Colorado Veterinarians, The Bachelor, Kate Upton, Band Name Tattoos, Barry Bonds, Extended Stay America Hotels, The Ugly Duckling, Greeting Cards); Three-legged Pants Dance (Cameron Diaz)

=== March ===
No.	Original release date	Guest(s)	Musical/entertainment guest(s)
11	March 3, 2014	Tina Fey, Randy Newman	Randy Newman
Oscar Hairstyles on James Poyser; Chicago Polar Plunge; Jimmy Fallon, Idina Menzel & The Roots sing "Let It Go" from Frozen with classroom instruments; Lip Flip (Tina Fey); Randy Newman performed "I Love L.A."
12	March 4, 2014	Chelsea Handler, Lea Michele	Lea Michele
Pros & Cons: Going to Mardi Gras; Freestylin' with The Roots; Lea Michele performed "Cannonball"
13	March 5, 2014	Annette Bening, Norman Reedus	The Avett Brothers
Norman Reedus reads Bro app texts; Jimmy announces he's thinking about getting a truck; Tonight Show Screengrabs; Flip Cup (Annette Bening); The Avett Brothers performed "Skin and Bones"
14	March 6, 2014	Liam Neeson, Lindsay Lohan	Bad Things
Jimmy's still thinking about getting a truck; Tonight Show #hashtags: #awkwardbreakup; Water War (Lindsay Lohan); Bad Things performed "Caught Inside"
15	March 7, 2014	Stephen Colbert, Keri Russell	Broken Bells
Jimmy's still thinking about getting a truck; Thank You Notes (Microsoft Windows Phone, Mardi Gras, Montana's New Study, Frozen Margaritas, Chester Cheetah, Aquarium Treasure Chest, Dyslexia, Kraft Singles); Tonight Show Truth or Truth (Stephen Colbert); Jimmy tries on Keri Russell's wig; Broken Bells performed "Holding On for Life"
16	March 10, 2014	Kristen Bell, Steve Harvey	Bobby McFerrin
Tonight Show Celebrity Photobomb (at Top of the Rock, with Jon Hamm); Pictionary (Jimmy Fallon & Demi Lovato Vs. Kristen Bell & Steve Harvey); Bobby McFerrin performed "Drive"
17	March 11, 2014	Tyler Perry, Billy Eichner	Juanes
Jimmy's still thinking about getting a truck; Tonight Show Pros & Cons: St. Patrick's Day; Tonight Show Do Not Read; Billy in the Audience; Juanes performed "La Luz"
18	March 12, 2014	Shailene Woodley, Artie Lange	Beck
Vladimir Putin's Kickstarter video; Time to Rhyme; Judith Hill joined The Roots for the entire episode; Tonight Show Audience Suggestion Box (including Black Simon & Garfunkel, Hug Cam, Yahoo! Answers sung by Audra McDonald); Double-Turtleneck Ping Pong (Jimmy Fallon & Shailene Woodley Vs. Steve Higgins & Artie Lange); Beck performed "Waking Light"
19	March 13, 2014	Julianna Margulies, Patton Oswalt	Nate Bargatze
First Lick parody; Jimmy sends audience members on date; Jimmy's still thinking about getting a truck; Tonight Show #hashtags: #badspringbreak; Tonight Show Dramatic Turn & Read (Julianna Margulies)
20	March 14, 2014	James Franco, Andy Cohen, Larry Webster	Jake Bugg
Thank You Notes (St Patrick's Day/Mardi Gras/Spring Break, Sbarro Pizza Chain, Getting Up from the Table to Use the Bathroom, Nike Swoosh, "Kiss Me, I'm Irish" Shirts, Llamas, Plugging Your Phone When It's at 10%, Entering My PIN Number, Sunny Side Up Eggs, Watching a Movie in Class) (Hot Sax); Larry Webster helps Jimmy pick out a truck; Andy Cohen christens The Tonight Show; Jake Bugg performed "Me and You"
21	March 17, 2014	James Spader, Kermit the Frog	Black 47
Tariq celebrates St. Patrick's Day; Jimmy acknowledged death of David Brenner; Tonight Show Popular Mathematics; Kermit gave Jimmy a Muppet pipe wrench for his Muppet pipes; Kermit performed "Bein' Green" with Jimmy; Black 47 performed "St. Patricks Day"
22	March 18, 2014	Lena Dunham, Hugh Dancy	Foster the People
Tonight Show Pros & Cons: Going on Spring Break; Pyramid (Hugh Dancy & Lena Dunham Vs. Jimmy Fallon & Questlove); Foster the People performed "Coming of Age"
23	March 19, 2014	Greg Kinnear, Emilia Clarke	Frank Castronovo & Frank Falcinelli
Vladimir Putin and Barack Obama's phone conversation; Random Object Shootout (Greg Kinnear)
24	March 20, 2014	Billy Joel, Chelsea Clinton	Billy Joel
Tonight Show Superlatives; Tonight Show #hashtags: #makesmemad; Billy Joel and Jimmy performed "The Lion Sleeps Tonight"; Billy Joel and Jimmy performed "You May Be Right"
25	March 21, 2014	Kevin Bacon, Jeff Musial	Ty Dolla Sign
Thank You Notes (Smart Tags, Spring, Marathon Charity E-Mail Kids, Brunch, Tooth Fairy, Cardboard Coffee Holder, Pears, Zebras); Kevin Bacon's Footloose entrance; Ty Dolla Sign performed "Paranoid"
26	March 24, 2014	Arnold Schwarzenegger, Carson Daly	Vampire Weekend
Tonight Show Do's & Don't's; Tonight Show In Reply To; Now We're Cookin' with Zach Striker (Arnold Schwarzenegger); Vampire Weekend performed "Unbelievers"
27	March 25, 2014	Jude Law, Shakira	Shakira
Jimmy figured out which truck he wants; Tonight Show Pros & Cons: March Madness; Tonight Show Funny Face Off (Jude Law); Shakira performed "Empire"
28	March 26, 2014	Bill Cosby, Joby Ogwyn	N/A
Tonight Show Questions & Danswers; Jimmy tries on virtual reality goggles; Nathan East sits in with The Roots; Tonight Show Celebrity Whispers...; Tonight Show Screengrabs; Bill Cosby walks on tightrope; Jody Ogwyn teaches him how to fly
29	March 27, 2014	Russell Crowe, Joan Rivers	The National
Tonight Show That's What They Said; Jimmy counts down top/bottom songs in the country; Tonight Show #hashtags: #RobFordBaby; Russell Crowe performed "Folsom Prison Blues"; The National performed "This Is the Last Time"
30	March 28, 2014	January Jones, Josh Holloway	Passenger
Mark Kelley signs up for Obamacare; Two audience members read monologue jokes; Jimmy decides on a truck, and announces Tonight Show Fingers on a 4x4; Thank You Notes (Kim Jong-un, Dancing With The Stars, Shakira, Saying the Word "Brewery", The Last Couple Still Sitting in a Restaurant Before it Closes, Billy Dee Williams, Clif Bars); Giant Quarters (January Jones); Passenger performed "Scare Away the Dark"
31	March 31, 2014	Chris Evans, Ricky Jay	N/A
Tonight Show Fingers on a 4x4; The Sibling-Wed Game (Chris Evans and Scott Evans); Ricky Jay and Jimmy play poker

=== April ===
No.	Original release date	Guest(s)	Musical/entertainment guest(s)
32	April 1, 2014	Samuel L. Jackson, Minnie Driver	Pitbull featuring G.R.L.
Tonight Show This Vs. That; Billy Dee Williams and Chewbacca slow dance; Tonight Show Fingers on a 4x4 (appearance by Mario Batali); Samuel L. Jackson recites Boy Meets World poem; Pitbull featuring G.R.L. performed "Wild Wild Love"
33	April 2, 2014	Denis Leary, Cat Deeley	Nickel Creek
Tonight Show Wait What Was the Question?; Vladimir Putin's phone call (appearance by Sarah Palin); Tonight Show Fingers on a 4x4; Nickel Creek performed "Destination"
34	April 3, 2014	Daniel Radcliffe, Cedric the Entertainer	Travie McCoy
Putin Pick Up Lines; Tariq celebrates Spring; Tonight Show #hashtags: #MyWorstCar; Sticky Balls (Daniel Radcliffe); Cedric the Entertainer sings reggae music; Jimmy buys his truck (appearance by Toby Keith); Travie McCoy performed "Keep On Keeping On"
35	April 4, 2014	Bill O'Reilly, Anthony Mackie	Sky Ferreira
Jimmy acknowledges David Letterman's retirement (Top Ten); Thank You Notes (Michael Strahan, Cherry Stem Tie-Knotting, Kathie Lee Gifford, Cribs, Facebook Blue Dinosaur, "No Shirt, No Shoes, No Service" Restaurant Signs, Incense); Nicknames; Sky Ferreira performed "I Blame Myself"; Jimmy drives out in his new truck
36	April 7, 2014	Colin Firth, Chloë Grace Moretz	Nas featuring Q-Tip
Kamal Gray fake-loses weight (Kamal's Chunky Trunks); John Oates sits in with The Roots; Tonight Show Do Not Play; Nas featuring Q-Tip performed "One Love"
37	April 8, 2014	Anne Hathaway, Marlon Wayans	Yusuf
Protest Signs; Tonight Show Pros & Cons: Watching Game of Thrones; Anne Hathaway sings Broadway versions of hip-hop songs; Yusuf performed a medley of his songs
38	April 9, 2014	Jennifer Garner, Dave Grohl & Krist Novoselic	Stevie Nicks
Tonight Show Good Advice Bad Advice; Jimmy and Stevie Nicks recreate "Stop Draggin' My Heart Around" music video; Stevie Nicks performed "Edge of Seventeen"
39	April 10, 2014	Kevin Costner, Danica McKellar	Alan Cumming & cast of Cabaret
Philip Bailey sits in with The Roots; Tonight Show #hashtags: #MyWeirdFamily; Palindrome Trivia; Alan Cumming & cast of Cabaret performed "Willkommen"
40	April 11, 2014	Nicolas Cage, Emily VanCamp	Kiss
Tonight Show Questions & Danswers; ESPN cricket ad; Thank You Notes (Easter Bunny Costume, Passover Seder Plate, Joint Facebook Account Couples, Dancing With the Stars, Earbud Untangling, Lyndon B. Johnson, Kiss) (Hot Sax); Kiss performed "King of the Night Time World"
41	April 21, 2014	Brian Williams, Christina Hendricks, Chef Ilan Hall	N/A
Brian Williams raps "Gin and Juice" video; Freestylin' with The Roots
42	April 22, 2014	David Duchovny, John Oliver	Rita Ora
Tonight Show Superlatives; Tonight Show Pros & Cons: Celebrating Earth Day; Beer Hockey (David Duchovny); Rita Ora performed "I Will Never Let You Down"
43	April 23, 2014	Cameron Diaz, Jim Gaffigan	Future featuring Pusha T
Jimmy tells jokes for a depressed panda; Tonight Show Audience Suggestion Box (appearance by Latimore; singing "Let the Doorknob Hit Ya", Stefanie Dolson dances with Jimmy); Roller Golf (Cameron Diaz); Future featuring Pusha T performed "Move That Dope"
44	April 24, 2014	Dr. Phil McGraw, James Van Der Beek	Courtney Barnett
Tariq and Jimmy's Inner Thoughts; Jimmy tells jokes for a depressed panda; Steven Tyler sits in with The Roots, and sings outgoing message on an audience member's cell phone; Tonight Show #hashtags: #WeddingFail; Vladimir Putin and Barack Obama on Dr. Phil; Courtney Barnett performed "Avant Gardener"
45	April 25, 2014	Jamie Foxx, Alan Cumming	Alicia Keys and Kendrick Lamar
FallonPanda names; Thank You Notes (Easter and 4/20, NBA Playoffs, Blooming Trees, McDonald's, Department Store Security Scanner Walking, Aloe, Elmer Fudd/Tweety Bird/Daffy Duck, The Letter "Y"); Jamie Foxx sings un-sexy words in a sexy way; Jamie Foxx beat-boxes; Alicia Keys and Kendrick Lamar performed "It's On Again"
46	April 28, 2014	Emma Stone, Robinson Canó	Keith Urban
Banned Russian Swear Words; Robinson Canó gets booed behind cardboard cut-out; Lip Sync Battle (Emma Stone); Keith Urban performed "Cop Car"
47	April 29, 2014	Diane Keaton, Dane DeHaan	David Byrne and The Atomic Bomb Band
Tariq cooks Danish cuisine; Jimmy tells jokes for a happy panda; Daley sits in with The Roots; Tonight Show Pros & Cons: Going to the Kentucky Derby; Red Wine with Ice Pong (Diane Keaton); David Byrne and The Atomic Bomb Band performed "Fantastic Man"
48	April 30, 2014	David Spade, Sophia Bush	The Both
Tonight Show Celebrity Photobomb (at Top of the Rock, with Cameron Diaz); Jimmy promotes Jack Daniel's Sinatra Select; Tonight Show In Reply To; The Both performed "Milwaukee"

=== May ===
No.	Original release date	Guest(s)	Musical/entertainment guest(s)
49	May 1, 2014	Andrew Garfield, Mary Lynn Rajskub	Chvrches
Jimmy tells jokes to cheer up Rob Ford; Horses That Will Not Be Running in the Kentucky Derby; Tonight Show #hashtags: #KentuckyDerbyRap; Andrew Garfield plays guitar; Andrew and Jimmy race motorcycles; Chvrches performed "Recover"
50	May 2, 2014	Kevin Spacey, Lewis Black	N/A
Youth specialist Craig Newton (Chris Kattan); Thank You Notes (Adam Silver, Donald Sterling's Girlfriend, Gillette Fusion ProGlide FlexBall, Groupon Skydiving Deal, The "You Say Potato, I Say Potato" Phrase, May 4th, Petco Aquariums, Netflix); The Ragtime Gals performed "Talk Dirty" by Jason Derulo (with Kevin Spacey); Angel Cards
51	May 5, 2014	Bryan Cranston, Brie Larson, Kevin Delaney	N/A
Latimore sits in with The Roots; Tonight Show Popular Mathematics; Tonight Show Word Sneak (Bryan Cranston)
52	May 6, 2014	Seth Rogen, Matt Bomer	Coldplay
The Wonder Years episode that deals with Dancing with the Stars; Jimmy plays tracks from …And Then You Shoot Your Cousin; Tonight Show Pros & Cons: Having a Devil Baby; Ew! sketch (Seth Rogen, Zac Efron); Seth Rogen sketches a nude drawing of James Franco; Coldplay performed "Magic"
53	May 7, 2014	Zac Efron, Guy Fieri, Jadeveon Clowney	Sarah McLachlan
Tariq celebrates Cinco de Mayo; Dr. Seuss books that encourage bad habits; Tonight Show Meet the Players: 2014 NFL Draft; Jimmy runs 40-Yard Dash; Sarah McLachlan performed "In Your Shoes"
54	May 8, 2014	Michael Fassbender, Zoe Saldaña	N/A
Tonight Show Questions & Danswers; Jimmy counts down top/bottom songs in the country; Tonight Show #hashtags: #MomQuotes; GE Tonight Show Fallonventions: Kid's Inventions
55	May 9, 2014	James McAvoy, Amy Schumer	tUnE-yArDs
The Roots pay spelled-out tribute to their mothers; Thank You Notes (Nintendo Loss, Roger Federer, Graduation Gowns, Mothers, Spandex Jogging Pants-Wearing People, Tongue Crinkling People); Invisible Double-Dutch (James McAvoy, Amy Schumer, Tariq, F. Knuckles); Tonight Show Truth or Truth (Amy Schumer); tUnE-yArDs performed "Water Fountain"
56	May 12, 2014	Louis C.K., Neil Young & Jack White	Neil Young
The Tonight Show Inside Look (Megan Boone); Tonight Show Screengrabs; Neil Young performed "Crazy" in a vinyl record-producing booth
57	May 13, 2014	Dolly Parton, Taylor Kitsch	Dolly Parton
TMZ video audio; New Diet Coke Slogans; Tonight Show Pros & Cons: Going to Kim and Kanye's Wedding; Jimmy plays tracks from …And Then You Shoot Your Cousin; Mets Bucket Hat Guy; Jimmy tries on Dolly Parton's wig; Slap Shot (Taylor Kitsch); Dolly Parton performed "Home"
58	May 14, 2014	Maya Rudolph, Robert Duvall	Lily Allen
Tonight Show Audience Suggestion Box (appearance by Two Really Fun Men, Lance Bass; singing "Big Mouth Lance Bass"); Maya and Jimmy invent new characters; Lily Allen performed "Hard Out Here"
59	May 15, 2014	Jennifer Lawrence, Craig Robinson	The cast of A Gentleman's Guide to Love and Murder
Jeopardy! Categories; Young Steve Higgins (Andy Samberg); Jimmy announces Chad Smith/Will Ferrell drum-off; Tonight Show #hashtags: #MyWeirdNeighbor; Box of Lies (Jennifer Lawrence); Craig Robinson leads a Tonight Show sing-along; the cast of A Gentleman's Guide to Love and Murder performed "I Don't Understand the Poor"
60	May 16, 2014	Drew Barrymore, Giovanni Ribisi	Elbow
Chipotle Mexican Grill poems; Tariq disappointed NBC isn't doing a Tonight Show musical, then Jimmy and Tariq do a musical number; Thank You Notes (California Chrome, Beyoncé, Prom, Mario Andretti, Pool Chalk, Ampersand, College Graduation, "What Would Jesus Do?" Bracelet-Wearing People); Adam Sandler interviews Drew Barrymore over the phone, then makes a surprise appearance; Tonight Show Lip Flip (Drew Barrymore); Elbow performed "New York Morning"
61	May 19, 2014	Liam Neeson, Terry Crews	Conor Oberst
Godzilla tweets; Don Mattingly makes a surprise appearance; Jimmy announces a June 16–19 date of shows at Universal Orlando Resort; Tonight Show Do Not Read; Nip Sync (Terry Crews); Conor Oberst performed "Zigzagging Toward the Light"
62	May 20, 2014	Charlize Theron, Josh Hartnett	The Roots
Jimmy announces bet with the Montreal Canadiens; Tonight Show Pros & Cons: The Voice Season Finale; Charades (Jimmy Fallon & Josh Hartnett Vs. Charlize Theron & Steve Higgins); The Roots performed "Never"
63	May 21, 2014	Hugh Jackman, Jimmy Page	Barry Gibb
Kamal Gray can play the keyboard; Josh Kaufman sits in with The Roots; Tonight Show Good Advice Bad Advice; Jimmy promotes dog treats; Cooler Scooter Race (Hugh Jackman); Barry Gibb performed "Jive Talkin'"
64	May 22, 2014	Amanda Seyfried, Will Ferrell & Chad Smith	Red Hot Chili Peppers
Tonight Show Celebrity Whispers...; Tonight Show #hashtags: #PromFail; Chad Smith/Will Ferrell drum-off (Will Ferrell brings out a cowbell, and Red Hot Chili Peppers make an appearance, performing Blue Öyster Cult's "(Don't Fear) The Reaper"); Red Hot Chili Peppers performed "Standing on the Verge of Getting It On"
65	May 23, 2014	Seth MacFarlane, Thandiwe Newton	Rascal Flatts
Service men and women sit in the audience; Facebook Headlines; Thank You Notes (Happy the Happy Meal Mascot, "...And Then You Shoot Your Cousin" Album, NBA Teams (Heat, Pacers, Spurs, Thunder), FaceTime, Two Fork and Spoon in Bag Takeout Restaurants, X-Men: Days of Future Past, Mutton Chops, Fleet Week); Random Object Shootout (service men and women, Ice-T); Seth MacFarlane reads negative critics review headlines of A Million Ways to Die in the West; Rascal Flatts performed "Rewind"

=== June ===
No.	Original release date	Guest(s)	Musical/entertainment guest(s)
66	June 2, 2014	Ricky Gervais, Ansel Elgort	Miranda Lambert
Montreal Canadiens mascot Youppi! wearing New York Rangers jersey, riding a mechanical bull; Ryan Lewis asks people about himself (appearance by Macklemore); Tonight Show Word Sneak (Ricky Gervais); Ansel Elgort and Jimmy tap-dance; Miranda Lambert performed "Automatic"
67	June 3, 2014	Jonah Hill, Mayor Rahm Emanuel	Soundgarden
Apple Inc. desktop operator Yosemite help feature; Mark Kelley teleports; Tonight Show Pros & Cons: Horse Racing in New York; Jonah Hill's NASCAR voice-over; Rahm Emanuel makes bet with Jimmy to take the show to Chicago; Soundgarden performed "Spoonman"
68	June 4, 2014	Tom Cruise, Kendall & Kylie Jenner	Chrissie Hynde
Kevin Eubanks mistakes Jimmy for Jay Leno; Jimmy does the "Gangnam Style" dance (appearance by Matt Lauer); Tonight Show In Reply To; Face Breakers (Tom Cruise); Chrissie Hynde performed "Dark Sunglasses"
69	June 5, 2014	Mike Myers, Neil deGrasse Tyson	Damon Albarn
Celebrity Apology Form Letter; Tonight Show #hashtags: #WorstSummerJob; Mike Myers' and Jimmy's film posters; Damon Albarn performed "Lonely Press Play"
70	June 6, 2014	Channing Tatum, Joshua Topolsky	Julian McCullough
Thank You Notes (Taco Bell's Quesarito, Justin Bieber, Microwave Ding, Wedding Ring Bearers, LeBron James, Lack of Air Conditioning in the NBA Finals, Old Belts, Yogurt Bottom Fruit); Jimmy promotes working out; Channing Tatum beatboxes as Tariq raps; Jimmy and Channing Tatum arm wrestle; Joshua Topolsky shows off new technology (Jimmy and Channing Tatum use virtual reality headset)
71	June 9, 2014	Clint Eastwood, Jack White	Jack White
Jokey Corporation Tweets; Jimmy acknowledges Tracy Morgan's car accident; Jimmy counts down top/bottom songs in the country; Tight Pants (Jennifer Lopez); Jack White performed "Lazaretto"
72	June 10, 2014	Jim Carrey & Jeff Daniels, Taylor Schilling	Ed Sheeran
Tonight Show Quest for the Qup; Tonight Show Pros & Cons: Going to the World Cup; debut of first Dumb and Dumber To trailer; Jacob's Patience (Jim Carrey, Jeff Daniels); Ed Sheeran performed "Sing"
73	June 11, 2014	Barbara Walters, Mama June & Honey Boo Boo	Iliza Shlesinger
Tonight Show Wax On Wax Off; Honey Boo Boo does a cheer
74	June 12, 2014	Chris Rock, Governor Chris Christie	Kacey Musgraves
Hashtag the Panda is Ben Stiller; Tonight Show #hashtags: #Dadvice; The Evolution of Dad Dancing with Chris Christie; Kacey Musgraves performed "The Trailer Song"
75	June 13, 2014	Dave Chappelle	Ice-T & Body Count
Edward Snowden Survey; Thank You Notes (Jamaican Lawmakers, Tuleco, George R.R. Martin, Throwback Thursday, "Artisanal" Foods, Firefox Logo, Checkout Line Sale Candy, Gavels); Jimmy promotes Outback Steakhouse; Sup (Jonah Hill, Channing Tatum, Ice Cube); Ice-T & Body Count performed "Enter the Dark Side"
76	June 16, 2014	Jennifer Lopez, Keenen Ivory Wayans	Jennifer Lopez
From Universal Orlando: Jeopardy! Categories; Brian Williams raps "Baby Got Back"; Jimmy and Steve Higgins visit Ollivanders at The Wizarding World of Harry Potter; Jennifer Lopez performed "First Love"
77	June 17, 2014	Kevin Hart, Jimmy Buffett	Jimmy Buffett
From Universal Orlando: United States World Cup team statistics; Questlove and Tariq re-enact a scene from The Bachelorette; Tonight Show Pros & Cons: Doing The Tonight Show from Universal Studios; Dance Avenue footage; Kevin Hart and Jimmy ride the Hollywood Rip, Ride, Rockit rollercoaster; Jimmy Buffett brings Jimmy flip-flops; Jimmy Buffett performed "Volcano"
78	June 18, 2014	Rosario Dawson, Jeff Musial	fun.
From Universal Orlando: Tonight Show Mom & Pop Quiz: Harry Potter Edition; Tonight Show Audience Suggestion Box (The Roots ride Doctor Doom's Fearfall, Hashtag the Panda and Stuff the Magic Dragon have a dance-off, Tariq does Harry Potter rap); exclusive clip from Sin City: A Dame to Kill For; Jeff Musial brings an elephant to the Universal Orlando soundstage; fun. performed "Harsh Light"
79	June 19, 2014	George Lopez, Pitbull	Pitbull
From Universal Orlando: Thank You Notes (Florida Weather, Butterbeer, Hollywood Rip Ride Rocket Rollercoaster, Water Ride Plastic Poncho-Wearing People, British Government, Dunkin' Donuts, The phrase "It's Not the Heat, It's the Humidity!," Clorox Toilet Wand); George Lopez gives away tickets to his concert; Giant Duff Beer Pong (Pitbull); Pitbull performed "We Are One (Ole Ola)/Timber"

=== July ===
No.	Original release date	Guest(s)	Musical/entertainment guest(s)
80	July 7, 2014	Kiefer Sutherland, Nicole Richie	Crosby, Stills & Nash
New Titles For Hard Choices; Letter Warren G. Harding wrote to his mistress; Tonight Show Good Advice Bad Advice; Jimmy performs as Neil Young (appearance by Crosby, Stills & Nash); Crosby, Stills & Nash performed "Teach Your Children"
81	July 8, 2014	Halle Berry, Chris Colfer	Florida Georgia Line
Hot Sax; Tonight Show Pros & Cons: Owning a Pot Store; This Is How We Roll (Halle Berry); Charades (Jimmy Fallon & Chris Colfer Vs. Steve Higgins & Halle Berry); Florida Georgia Line performed "Dirt"
82	July 9, 2014	Kelly Ripa, Joe Manganiello	Sylvan Esso
Anti-gambling commercial; Tonight Show Do Not Read; Tonight Show Pop Quiz (Kelly Ripa); Sylvan Esso performed "Coffee"
83	July 10, 2014	Dana Carvey, Hailee Steinfeld	Magic!
Get Your Priorities Together Jimmy; Tonight Show #hashtags: #UnhappyCamper; Wheel of Impressions (Dana Carvey); Dana Carvey performed "The Lady I Know"; Magic! performed "Rude"
84	July 11, 2014	Liev Schreiber, Rob Reiner	Gabriel Iglesias
Tonight Show Superlatives; Thank You Notes
85	July 14, 2014	Michael Strahan, Diane Kruger	Phish
Tonight Show Screengrabs; Catchphrase (Michael Strahan & Jimmy Fallon Vs. Steve Higgins & Diane Kruger); Diane Kruger's birthday; Phish performed "Waiting All Night"
86	July 15, 2014	Cameron Diaz, Josh Gad	Bleachers
Tonight Show Pros & Cons: Dating in the Nude; Kayak Race (Cameron Diaz); Bleachers performed "I Wanna Get Better"
87	July 16, 2014	Whoopi Goldberg, Stephen Moyer	Puss n Boots
CBS tweets; Tonight Show In Reply To; Whoopi Goldberg brings Jimmy pies from Four & Twenty Blackbirds, Brooklyn; Tonight Show Lip Flip (Whoopi Goldberg); Puss n Boots performed "Don't Know What It Means"
88	July 17, 2014	John Lithgow, Miranda Kerr	Jason Mraz
Tonight Show Tale of the Tape: Biden Vs. Cheney; The Weather Channel shows (clip from 30% Chance of Betrayal); Jimmy checks in with Monty Python; Tonight Show #hashtags: #AwkwardBreakUp; John Lithgow brings children's books for Jimmy's daughter; Jimmy tests out Miranda Kerr's product; Flip Cup (Miranda Kerr); Jason Mraz performed "Love Someone"
89	July 18, 2014	Dan Aykroyd, Chaz Ebert	Nick Thune
Video game characters based on real people; Chimps' reactions to Dawn of the Planet of the Apes; Ken Burns documentary photos; Thank You Notes; Dan Aykroyd and Bobby Rush performed "I'll Go Crazy"
90	July 21, 2014	Kate Hudson, Ellar Coltrane	Nico & Vinz
Tonight Show Tale of the Tape: Horse Vs. Ford; The Roots don't know the film When Harry Met Sally...; Tonight Show Superlatives; Box of Lies (Kate Hudson); Nico & Vinz performed "Am I Wrong"
91	July 22, 2014	Dwayne Johnson, Mel B	Chronixx
Six Flags rides; Tonight Show Pros & Cons: Washington, D.C. Decriminalizing Marijuana; debut of Hercules action figure; The Fungo Brothers (Dwayne Johnson); Chronixx performed "Here Comes Trouble"
92	July 23, 2014	Robin Wright, Josh Charles	Weezer
"This Little Piggy" by Rob Ford; Tonight Show Audience Suggestion Box (Roy Bongo performed "Grown Tube Techno", Audra McDonald sings Yahoo! Answers); Tonight Show Turn and Face the Music (Robin Wright); Weezer performed "Back to the Shack"
93	July 24, 2014	Morgan Freeman, Kesha	Tweedy
Darth Vader Presidential Campaign Slogans; Fifty Shades of Grey trailer dubbed with Pee-wee Herman; Tonight Show #hashtags: #MyWorstBirthday; Morgan Freeman and Jimmy suck helium balloons; Tweedy performed "Summer Noon"
94	July 25, 2014	Jon Hamm, Brit Marling, Martha Stewart	N/A
Thank You Notes; Palisades Park Pet Patrol (Jon Hamm); Jimmy and Martha Stewart have a cooking competition
95	July 28, 2014	James Franco, Chadwick Boseman	Jenny Lewis
The New York Times Crossword Puzzle; Freestylin' with The Roots; Tonight Show 5–Second Summaries (James Franco); Jenny Lewis performed "Just One of the Guys"
96	July 29, 2014	Vin Diesel, Aubrey Plaza	will.i.am and Cody Wise
Rick Perry Quotes; Hashtag the Panda injures himself; The Roots React: To The Fifty Shades of Grey Trailer; Tonight Show Pros & Cons: A Joe Biden Presidency; Vin Diesel does Guardians of the Galaxy line in multiple languages; will.i.am and Cody Wise performed "It's My Birthday"
97	July 30, 2014	Heidi Klum, Mike Birbiglia	Temples
Child-written cue card; Tonight Show Celebrity Netflix Queues; This Is How We Roll (Heidi Klum); Temples performed "Shelter Song"
98	July 31, 2014	Julia Roberts, Andy Cohen	Ron Funches
Fifty Shades of Grape; Tonight Show #hashtags: #MyDumbFight; Tonight Show Face Balls (Julia Roberts)

=== August ===
No.	Original release date	Guest(s)	Musical/entertainment guest(s)
99	August 1, 2014	Martin Lawrence, Jenny Slate	Aloe Blacc
Facebook Headlines; Incomparable OkCupid Couple; Categories Avoided on Teen Jeopardy!; Thank You Notes; Aloe Blacc performed "Love Is the Answer"
100	August 4, 2014	Helen Mirren, James Cameron	Spoon
Presidential birthday card; Code Phrases; Jimmy wants to get a playlist for, and name his truck; Tonight Show Picture This; Mirren, Mirren; Spoon performed "Do You"
101	August 5, 2014	Clive Owen, Nina Dobrev	The Head and the Heart
Graduation Names; Hotel Reviews; Tonight Show Pros & Cons: Going to Summer Camp in North Korea; Giant Beer Pong (Nina Dobrev); The Head and the Heart performed "Let's Be Still"
102	August 6, 2014	Megan Fox, Nick Cannon	Wiz Khalifa
Friendliest city/unfriendliest city resident question and answers; Lester Holt sits in with The Roots; Tonight Show Screengrabs; Pictionary (Jimmy Fallon & Wiz Khalifa Vs. Megan Fox & Nick Cannon); Wiz Khalifa performed "Stayin' Out All Night"
103	August 7, 2014	Will Arnett, T.I.	T.I.
True Detective Alternate Dialogue; Pro-weed ads; Tonight Show #hashtags: #MyWeirdSecret; Will Arnett brings Jimmy some wine; Tonight Show Karate Piñata (Will Arnett); Will Arnett takes the wine back, and gives it to T.I.; T.I. performed "Mediocre/About the Money"
104	August 8, 2014	Jeff Bridges, Ali Larter	Andy Woodhull
Tonight Show That's What They Said; Everyone has thirty seconds of laughing; Jimmy gives an update on his truck situation; Thank You Notes
105	August 11, 2014	Katie Holmes, Chris Hardwick	OneRepublic
Anthony Weiner restaurant names; President Obama Vacation Obama; Baby statement; White House Slogans; Tonight Show Superlatives; Tonight Show Photo Booth (Katie Holmes); Chris Hardwick and Jimmy sing "We've Got Tonight"; OneRepublic performed "Love Runs Out"
106	August 12, 2014	Mickey Rourke, Rob Riggle	Kings of Leon
Tonight Show Tale of the Tape: Hillary Vs. Obama; Ace Frehley sits in with The Roots; Jimmy pays tribute to Robin Williams; Tonight Show Digital Original: House of Cue Cards (appearances by Ellen Barkin and Jay Leno); Rob Riggle, Horatio Sanz, Steve Higgins, The Roots, and Jimmy take the ALS Ice Bucket Challenge; Kings of Leon performed "Family Tree"; Note: Instead of saying the episode number at the beginning, The Roots said "Nanu nanu" in memory of Robin Williams, who had died the day before.
107	August 13, 2014	Taylor Swift, Andrew Rannells	Ryan Adams and The Shining
Differences between characters and people who dress up like them; Steve Higgins' birthday; Ew! sketch (Taylor Swift); Ryan Adams and The Shining performed "Gimmie Something Good"
108	August 14, 2014	Sylvester Stallone, Eve Hewson	Rod Man
Obama's Minor Announcements; Do Americans still use the Post Office?; Tonight Show #hashtags: #VacationFail
109	August 15, 2014	Jason Statham, Demi Lovato, Chef David Chang	N/A
Tonight Show Obama Expressions; Cost-effective versions of cereals; BuzzFeed film titles; Mark Kelley ran into a glass wall; Thank You Notes; Tonight Show Hamster Ball Race (Jason Statham); David Chang challenges Jimmy to a hot wing eating contest
110	August 18, 2014	Bill Cosby, Rory McIlroy & Tiger Woods	Röyksopp and Robyn
NFL Tinder Profiles; Tonight Show In Reply To; Face Breakers (Rory McIlroy & Tiger Woods); Röyksopp and Robyn performed "Do It Again"
111	August 19, 2014	Pierce Brosnan, Tavi Gevinson	The Madden Brothers
Uber Statements; Tonight Show Pros & Cons: Going On a Juice Cleanse; Pierce Brosnan and Jimmy play GoldenEye; The Madden Brothers performed "We Are Done"
112	August 20, 2014	Jared Leto, Amy Brenneman	Thirty Seconds to Mars
Tom Bailey sits in with The Roots; Tonight Show Audience Suggestion Box (including Black Simon & Garfunkel, appearance by Lindsay Lohan; takes the ALS Ice Bucket Challenge); Intense Staredown (Jared Leto); Jimmy shaves Jared Leto's beard; Thirty Seconds to Mars performed "End of All Days"
113	August 21, 2014	Josh Brolin, Artie Lange, Giada De Laurentiis	N/A
Paul Ryan Facebook Posts; Tonight Show I've Got Good News and Good News; Tonight Show #hashtags: #MyRoommateIsWeird; Catchphrase (Jimmy Fallon & Giada De Laurentiis Vs. Steve Higgins & Artie Lange)
114	August 22, 2014	Ethan Hawke, Amy Sedaris	The Secret Sisters
Rick Perry Mugshot Campaigns; Tonight Show Between the Lines; Ice Council video; Jimmy talks to couple after monologue joke; Jimmy gives an update on his truck situation, reveals playlist; Thank You Notes; Amy Sedaris gives Jimmy a CPR lesson; The Secret Sisters performed "Iuka"

=== September ===
No.	Original release date	Guest(s)	Musical/entertainment guest(s)
115	September 2, 2014	Adam Levine, Meredith Vieira	Maroon 5
Tonight Show That's What They Said; Time to Rhyme; Tonight Show Pros & Cons: Playing Fantasy Football; Tonight Show Wheel of Musical Impressions (Adam Levine); debut of The Meredith Vieira Show set; Meredith Vieira and Jimmy exchange dog gifts; Maroon 5 performed "Maps"
116	September 3, 2014	Blake Shelton, Tim Heidecker & Eric Wareheim	Blake Shelton
Tonight Show Inside the Playbook: Wes Welker Edition; New Full House opening credits; Sheila E. sits in with The Roots; Tonight Show Picture This; Random Object Football Toss (Blake Shelton); Blake Shelton performed "Neon Light"
117	September 4, 2014	Larry David, Gisele Bündchen	Jeezy featuring Future
Tonight Show Questions & Danswers: Kids' Edition; Tonight Show Superlatives; Jimmy acknowledges death of Joan Rivers; Jimmy Fallon, Meghan Trainor & The Roots sing "All About That Bass" with classroom instruments; Gisele Bündchen shows Jimmy planking exercises; Jeezy featuring Future performed "No Tears"
118	September 5, 2014	Claire Danes, Mo'ne Davis	Fences featuring Macklemore
Rob Ford's Schedule; Apps targeted at seniors; Thank You Notes; Random Dancing (Mo'ne Davis); Mo'ne Davis and Jimmy pitch wiffle balls; Fences featuring Macklemore performed "Arrows"
119	September 8, 2014	Jason Segel, Steve Harvey	Alicia Keys
Jimmy counts down top/bottom songs in the country; Tonight Show Family Feud (Jason Segel); Alicia Keys performed "We Are Here"
120	September 9, 2014	Keith Richards, Debra Messing	The Replacements
Law Firm Commercial; Successful guys who have names that are hard to pronounce; Audio from Morgan Freeman's flight; Tonight Show Pros & Cons: Dating Britney Spears (appearance by Britney Spears); Theodora Richards draws Jimmy and Keith; Debra Messing juggles; The Replacements performed "Alex Chilton"
121	September 10, 2014	Hugh Jackman, Nick Offerman	Luke Bryan
Chris Christie Quotes; Tonight Show Audience Suggestion Box (Nick Offerman gives college advice, NASCAR cooler scooter race with Jimmie Johnson); Pool Bowling (Hugh Jackman); Luke Bryan performed "Roller Coaster"
122	September 11, 2014	Jessica Chastain, Jeffrey Tambor	Chris Brown
Jeffrey Tambor announces the opening; Hugh Jackman camps out on the set; book remakes for millennial-aged people; single audience members; Tonight Show Do Not Read; Tonight Show #hashtags: #WhenIWasAKid (appearance by Sesame Street characters); Chris Brown performed "X/Loyal Medley"
123	September 12, 2014	Glenn Close, Justin Long	Kurt Braunohler
Tonight Show Superlatives; Thank You Notes; Glenn Close does baby cries; Face-Stuffing Contest (Glenn Close)
124	September 15, 2014	Barbra Streisand	Barbra Streisand
Pick-up lines for Ivy League students; Tonight Show Facebook Headlines; Tonight Show Screengrabs; Barbra Streisand and Jimmy performed a medley of songs off Partners; Barbra Streisand sits at Jimmy's desk; Barbra Streisand performed "Come Rain or Come Shine"
125	September 16, 2014	Julianna Margulies, Jerry Lewis	Public Enemy
Tonight Show Pros & Cons: Having a College Roommate; Musical Morning Announcements (Julianna Margulies); Jerry Lewis and Jimmy have a conversation with music; Public Enemy performed "Public Enemy No. 1"
126	September 17, 2014	Liam Neeson, Terry Gilliam	Tim McGraw
The Tonight Show Inside Look (Tim McGraw); Netropolitan Status Updates; Tonight Show I've Got Good News and Good News; Lip Sync Battle (Gwen Stefani & Blake Shelton); Tim McGraw performed "Overrated"
127	September 18, 2014	Billy Crystal, Rose Byrne, Chef Nobu Matsuhisa	N/A
Tariq and Jimmy's Inner Thoughts; Tonight Show What's the Beef?; Art Cosby; Lecrae sits in with The Roots; Jimmy will take the show to Chicago; Tonight Show #hashtags: #WorstGiftEver; Tonight Show Lip Flip (Billy Crystal); Jimmy and Nobu Matsuhisa have a sushi-making contest
128	September 19, 2014	James Spader	Stevie Wonder (mystery guest)
Jimmy's birthday; Twitter Handbook for Politicians: Table of Contents; Hashtag the Panda has dental surgery; Tonight Show Superlatives; Seth Rogen and James Franco jump out of a cake; Stevie Wonder is the mystery guest; Thank You Notes; James Spader gives Jimmy a present; Stevie Wonder performed "Sir Duke"; Jimmy gives ice cream cake to audience
129	September 22, 2014	Sofía Vergara, Megan Boone	The Black Keys
Name of high school; Famous Dog Quotes; Freestylin' with The Roots; Tonight Show Lip Flip (Sofía Vergara); The Black Keys performed "Gotta Get Away"
130	September 23, 2014	Kerry Washington, Carson Daly	Julian Casablancas+The Voidz
Monologue jokes for members of the United Nations; Paula Deen Network Shows; Tonight Show Pros & Cons: Having a 100-pound Scrotum Removed; Jimmy promotes Samsung Curved UHD TV; Box of Lies (Kerry Washington); Carson Daly brings his baby; Julian Casablancas+The Voidz performed "Where No Eagles Fly"
131	September 24, 2014	Andy Samberg, Kevin Durant	Kenny Chesney
New White House Security Measures; Politicians embrace their identities; Tonight Show Kid Letters; Jimmy tries Andy Samberg's burger; Tonight Show 5–Second Summaries (Andy Samberg); Kenny Chesney performed "American Kids"
132	September 25, 2014	Chris Pratt, Rosamund Pike	John Mellencamp
Barack Obama addresses his comments; Tonight Show #hashtags: #MyWeirdFriend; Tonight Show Word Sneak (Chris Pratt); John Mellencamp sits in with The Roots; John Mellencamp performed "Troubled Man"
133	September 26, 2014	Matthew Broderick & Nathan Lane, Robert Plant	Robert Plant
Putin Movie Reviews; Tonight Show Superlatives; Thank You Notes; Matthew Broderick & Nathan Lane and Jimmy interview each other; Robert Plant and Jimmy performed "Duke of Earl"; Robert Plant performed "Rainbow"
134	September 29, 2014	Ben Affleck, Kate Walsh	Tony Bennett
Letters from celebrity babies to Charlotte Clinton; Tonight Show In Reply To; Lady Gaga's video introduction to Tony Bennett; Tony Bennett performed "But Beautiful/It Don't Mean a Thing"
135	September 30, 2014	Tyler Perry, Miles Teller	Lucinda Williams
E-Cigarette Warnings; Hashtag the Panda appears on Dancing with the Stars; New Hooters Ads; Jimmy announces live show during Super Bowl XLIX, and a week of shows in Los Angeles; Tonight Show Pros & Cons: Being a Nude Art Model; Drone Race (Tyler Perry); Miles Teller drums with The Roots; Lucinda Williams performed "Protection"; Captain Kirk Douglas' birthday

=== October ===
No.	Original release date	Guest(s)	Musical/entertainment guest(s)
136	October 1, 2014	Jennifer Garner, John Mulaney	Lady Antebellum
Tonight Show Audience Suggestion Box (New Yorkers name animals, Black Simon & Garfunkel, New York football team gets redemption); Catchphrase (Jimmy Fallon & Jennifer Garner Vs. Questlove & John Mulaney); Lady Antebellum performed "Bartender"
137	October 2, 2014	Derek Jeter, James Marsden	5 Seconds of Summer
New Secret Service Director Candidates; Republican Party Television Ad; The Roots' yearbook photos; Tonight Show #hashtags: #FallSongs (appearance by 5 Seconds of Summer); 5 Seconds of Summer performed "Good Girls"
138	October 3, 2014	Emma Thompson, Dane Cook	N/A
Celebrity Rapper Names; Tonight Show Superlatives; Thank You Notes; Password (Emma Thompson & Michael Cera Vs. Jimmy Fallon & Jim Parsons); Dane Cook did a stand-up comedy bit; Tariq's birthday
139	October 6, 2014	Jeremy Renner, Carol Burnett, Mario Batali	N/A
Joe Perry sits in with The Roots; will.i.am and Jimmy performed "Ew!"; Tensions (Carol Burnett)
140	October 7, 2014	Kristen Stewart, Artie Lange	Jason Aldean
Joe Biden Phone Recording; Nas sits in with The Roots; Tonight Show Pros & Cons: Joining the Anonymous Facebook; Tonight Show Do Not Game; Jimmy and Kristen Stewart play Ring Around the Nosey; Jason Aldean performed "Just Gettin' Started"
141	October 8, 2014	Robert Downey Jr., Ira Glass	Big & Rich
Surgeon General Warning Labels; what cartoon characters are up to these days; The Tonight Show Facebook Headlines; Intense Staredown (Robert Downey Jr.); Big & Rich performed "Look at You"
142	October 9, 2014	Steve Carell, Julianne Hough	Philip Selway featuring The Dap-Kings
New Campaign Slogans; America's Still #1; The Walking Dead footage edited to the tune of Welcome Back, Kotter; audience members do the "Shmoney dance"; Tonight Show #hashtags: #ThatWasStupid; Steve Carell catches grapes in his mouth; Tonight Show Word Sneak (Steve Carell); Julianne Hough teaches Jimmy a go-to dance move; Philip Selway featuring The Dap-Kings performed "It Will End in Tears"
143	October 10, 2014	Jada Pinkett Smith, Nick Kroll	Bobby Shmurda
Comic Con Vs. Times Square; Tonight Show Superlatives; Questlove does the "Shmoney dance"; Thank You Notes; Tonight Show Rock, Paper, Scissors, Pie! (Jada Pinkett Smith); Bobby Shmurda performed "Hot Boy"
144	October 13, 2014	Zach Galifianakis, Casey Wilson	Andrew Orvedahl
Obamacare Ads; New Toy Deals; Tonight Show I've Got Good News and Good News; Excuses (Zach Galifianakis); Casey Wilson brings painting of her father
145	October 14, 2014	Emma Stone, Logan Lerman	Sam Smith
Jimmy fires camerawoman; Tonight Show Pros & Cons: Watching The Walking Dead; Box of Lies (Emma Stone); Sam Smith performed "I'm Not the Only One"
146	October 15, 2014	Shailene Woodley, Michael Shannon	Eric Church
Popularity in New Jersey; Marriage Slogans; Lenny Pickett sits in with The Roots; Fan-made "Ew!" music video; Breakdance Conversation (Brad Pitt); Shailene Woodley brings Jimmy seeds for his garden; Shailene Woodley shows Jimmy goth dance moves; Pumpkin Time Bomb (Shailene Woodley); Eric Church performed "Talladega"
147	October 16, 2014	Sting, Jason Schwartzman	The cast of The Last Ship
Alternate Name Options; Care Bears dubbed with Friends; Tonight Show #hashtags: #HalloweenFail; Jimmy promotes Folgers Flavors; Stingtones; Sting records audience member's outgoing voice-mail message; The cast of The Last Ship performed "If You Ever See Me Talking to a Sailor"
148	October 17, 2014	Bradley Cooper, Neil Diamond	Neil Diamond
Tonight Show Superlatives; Thank You Notes; Egg Russian Roulette (Bradley Cooper); Neil Diamond performed "Something Blue"
149	October 27, 2014	Ewan McGregor, Charles Barkley	Wilco
Queen Elizabeth II Tweets; Herbie Hancock sits in with The Roots; Jimmy counts down top/bottom songs in the country; Charades (Jimmy Fallon & Charles Barkley Vs. Ewan McGregor & Jeff Tweedy); Wilco performed "A Magazine Called Sunset"
150	October 28, 2014	Daniel Radcliffe, Mike Tyson	Sturgill Simpson
John Coleman Quotes; Tonight Show Pros & Cons: Dressing Up Your Pet for Halloween; Daniel Radcliffe sings hip-hop; Jimmy and Mike Tyson play Mike Tyson Punch Out; Sturgill Simpson performed "Turtles All the Way Down"
151	October 29, 2014	Jake Gyllenhaal, Paul Reubens	She & Him
Tonight Show Inside the Playbook: LeBron James Edition; George Clinton sits in with The Roots; Tonight Show Screengrabs; Water War (Jake Gyllenhaal); Avengers: Age of Ultron trailer dubbed with Pee-wee Herman; She & Him performed "Stay Awhile"
152	October 30, 2014	Gordon Ramsay	Little Big Town
Least Popular Candies; What Pets and Their Owners Are Thinking; Chris Rock gives rundown of top five Halloween costumes; The Tonight Show Instagrams: Halloween Edition; GE Tonight Show Fallonventions: Kid's Inventions; Little Big Town performed "Stay All Night"
153	October 31, 2014	Kevin Spacey, Olivia Munn	The Lucas Brothers
The Roots' hip-hop version of the Halloween theme song; Tonight Show Superlatives; Thank You Notes; Tonight Show Wheel of Impressions (Kevin Spacey)

=== November ===
No.	Original release date	Guest(s)	Musical/entertainment guest(s)
154	November 3, 2014	Anne Hathaway, Gael García Bernal, Madison Bumgarner	Stevie Nicks
Jimmy gets delivered Starbucks coffee; Tonight Show Kid Letters; Madison Bumgarner gives Jimmy underwear; Stevie Nicks performed "Lady" and "Rhiannon"
155	November 4, 2014	Savannah Guthrie and Matt Lauer, Felicity Jones	FKA twigs
Official Ballots; Tonight Show Pros & Cons: Voting in the Midterm Elections; Tonight Show Pop Quiz (Savannah Guthrie and Matt Lauer); FKA twigs performed "Two Weeks"
156	November 5, 2014	Bette Midler, Jim Gaffigan	Bette Midler
Tonight Show Dictionary; Tonight Show Lip Flip (Bette Midler); Bette Midler performed "Waterfalls"
157	November 6, 2014	Matthew McConaughey, Beth Behrs	Tove Lo
Barack Obama and Mitch McConnell Drinking Quotes; Tonight Show #hashtags: #IfIWasInCharge; Face Breakers (Matthew McConaughey); Tove Lo performed "Not on Drugs"
158	November 7, 2014	Jay Leno, Lucy Liu, Kevin Delaney	N/A
Tonight Show Superlatives; Dave Davies sits in with The Roots; Thank You Notes; Jay Leno did a stand-up comedy bit
159	November 10, 2014	Jeff Daniels, Mackenzie Foy	The New Basement Tapes
Vladimir Putin's Inspirational Quotes Book; Tonight Show Blind Date; Pyramid (Jeff Daniels & Usher Vs. Jimmy Fallon & Nick Jonas); Mackenzie Foy's birthday; Mackenzie Foy teaches Jimmy tae kwon do; The New Basement Tapes performed "Lost on the River"
160	November 11, 2014	Drew Barrymore, Peter and Bobby Farrelly	Johnny Marr
Crossover Series; Tonight Show Joke Book; Tonight Show Pros & Cons: The Return of the Polar Vortex; Spritz! (Drew Barrymore); Johnny Marr performed "Easy Money"
161	November 12, 2014	Channing Tatum, Eddie Redmayne	Logic
Yahoo! Answers sung by Audra McDonald; Box of Lies (Channing Tatum); Logic performed "I'm Gone"
162	November 13, 2014	Josh Hutcherson, Tracey Ullman	Echosmith
Jogstrap Commercial; Window Washer 911 Call; Tonight Show #hashtags: #MyFamilyIsWeird; Josh Hutcherson answers fan tweets; Beer Hockey (Josh Hutcherson); Echosmith performed "Cool Kids"
163	November 14, 2014	Liam Hemsworth, Katherine Heigl	Sebastian Maniscalco
Tonight Show Superlatives; Kool & the Gang sits in with The Roots; Thank You Notes; Liam Hemsworth answers fan tweets; Liam Hemsworth and Jimmy walk in high heels; Giant Tricycle Race (Liam Hemsworth)
164	November 17, 2014	Benedict Cumberbatch, Allison Williams	"Not U2" (Jimmy Fallon and The Roots)
Jim Carrey makes guest appearance with Jeff Daniels puppet; Tonight Show Three Word Stories (Benedict Cumberbatch); Allison Williams teaches Jimmy how to use Peter Pan Live! flying harness; Jimmy and The Roots performed U2's "Desire", after the band postponed a week-long residency on the show due to an injury to Bono
165	November 18, 2014	Russell Brand, Brooke Shields, Mario Batali	N/A
Congressmen Investments; Other Times Square Records; Facebook Headlines; Tonight Show Pros & Cons: Las Vegas Getting a Hockey Team; Tonight Show Word Sneak (Russell Brand)
166	November 19, 2014	Jon Stewart, Padma Lakshmi	Jim Gaffigan
The Hungry Names; Tonight Show Obama Expressions
167	November 20, 2014	Mark Ruffalo, Stephen Merchant	Romeo Santos
Tonight Show I've Got Good News and Good News; Anthony Kiedis sits in with The Roots; Tonight Show #hashtags: #ThanksgivingFail; Musical Beers (Stephen Merchant, Jimmy Fallon, Mark Ruffalo, Steve Higgins, Tariq); Romeo Santos performed "Eres Mía"
168	November 21, 2014	Julianne Moore, Michael Cera	Kid Rock
Obama's English and Spanish-language address; Tonight Show Superlatives; Thank You Notes; Catchphrase (Julianne Moore & Jimmy Fallon Vs. Michael Cera & Alan Cumming); Kid Rock performed "Jesus and Bocephus"
169	November 24, 2014	Tim Allen, will.i.am	Dej Loaf
Jimmy reveals The Tonight Show Starring Jimmy Fallon marquee; Turkeys Pardoned by Presidents Quotes; Tonight Show Do Not Read; Turkey Scooter Race (Tim Allen); will.i.am debuts his smartband wearable device, i.amPULS; Dej Loaf performed "Try Me"
170	November 25, 2014	Bill O'Reilly, Lorde	Lorde
Starbucks Thanksgiving RSVP's; Tonight Show Pros & Cons: Thanksgiving; Tonight Show Screengrabs; Lorde performed "Yellow Flicker Beat"
171	November 26, 2014	Christopher Walken, Nick Jonas	Iggy Azalea
Tonight Show Superlatives; Jimmy and Steve Higgins test skydiving simulator; Freestylin' with The Roots; Jimmy gives Nick Jonas gangster films; Iggy Azalea performed "Beg for It"
172	November 27, 2014	Whoopi Goldberg, Rashida Jones, Tom Colicchio	N/A
Thank You Notes; Rashida Jones and Jimmy sing holiday versions of songs; Whoopi Goldberg brings Jimmy a chocolate turkey

=== December ===
No.	Original release date	Guest(s)	Musical/entertainment guest(s)
173	December 1, 2014	Martin Short, Gabrielle Union	Mary J. Blige
Talk of the Town with Jiminy Glick; Pictionary (Jimmy Fallon & Martin Short Vs. Jerry Seinfeld & Miranda Sings); Mary J. Blige performed "Therapy"
174	December 2, 2014	Reese Witherspoon, David Sedaris	Rae Sremmurd
Slow Jam the News (Brian Williams); Tonight Show Pros & Cons: William and Kate Visiting New York City; Reese Witherspoon brings Jimmy reindeer figurines; Tonight Show Random Phrase Carols (Reese Witherspoon); Rae Sremmurd performed "No Flex Zone/No Type"
175	December 8, 2014	Chris Rock, Carrie Underwood	Carrie Underwood
Tonight Show 12 Days of Christmas Sweaters; Carrie Underwood performed "Something in the Water"
176	December 9, 2014	Ricky Gervais, Stevie Van Zandt	ILoveMakonnen
CIA Handbook Torture Techniques; Jimmy calls out Microsoft for getting rid of clip art; Jimmy says goodbye to CAPTCHA words; Tonight Show Pros & Cons: Santacon; Tonight Show 12 Days of Christmas Sweaters; Tonight Show Lip Flip (Ricky Gervais); Stevie Van Zandt and Jimmy performed "My Kind of Town"; ILoveMakonnen performed "Tuesday"
177	December 10, 2014	Mark Wahlberg, Kevin Nealon	N/A
Tonight Show 12 Days of Christmas Sweaters; The Ragtime Gals performed "Sexual Healing" by Marvin Gaye (with Steve Carell); Slapjack (Mark Wahlberg); Kevin Nealon did a stand-up comedy bit
178	December 11, 2014	Dwayne Johnson, Barbara Walters	Rick Ross featuring K. Michelle
Tonight Show Splittin' the Diff; Netflix ad; Tonight Show #hashtags: #HanukkahSongs; Tonight Show 12 Days of Christmas Sweaters; Intense Staredown (Dwayne Johnson); Dwayne Johnson brings Jimmy his own action figure; Barbara Walters brings Jimmy a present for his new daughter; Rick Ross featuring K. Michelle performed "If They Knew"
179	December 12, 2014	Martin Freeman, Megan Mullally	Yusuf/Cat Stevens
Congressmen Quotes; Tonight Show Superlatives; Tonight Show 12 Days of Christmas Sweaters; Thank You Notes; Antler Ring Toss (Martin Freeman); Yusuf/Cat Stevens performed "You Are My Sunshine"
180	December 15, 2014	Oprah Winfrey	Idina Menzel
Tonight Show 12 Days of Christmas Sweaters; Tonight Show Stocking Stuffers (appearance by Horatio Sanz as Santa Claus); Midnight Meadows (Oprah Winfrey); Idina Menzel performed "River"
181	December 16, 2014	Christoph Waltz, Nicki Minaj	Nicki Minaj featuring Skylar Grey
Tonight Show 12 Days of Christmas Sweaters; Tonight Show Stocking Stuffers; Camp Winnipesaukee (Justin Timberlake); Nicki Minaj featuring Skylar Grey performed "Bed of Lies"
182	December 17, 2014	Sir Paul McCartney	Tony Bennett and Lady Gaga
Hot Sax; Jeopardy! Categories; Craig Wayne Boyd sits in with The Roots; Tonight Show Dictionary; Tonight Show 12 Days of Christmas Sweaters; Tonight Show Stocking Stuffers (appearance by the Audience Giveaway Carolers); Tony Bennett and Lady Gaga performed "Cheek to Cheek/It Don't Mean a Thing"
183	December 18, 2014	Amy Adams, Nick Offerman	Foo Fighters
Nick Offerman reads shortened version of "Twas the Night Before Christmas"; Tonight Show #hashtags: #ChristmasFail; Tonight Show 12 Days of Christmas Sweaters; Tonight Show Stocking Stuffers; Holiday Flip Cup (Amy Adams); Foo Fighters performed "I Am a River"
184	December 19, 2014	Ben Stiller, Brie Larson	Damon Wayans
Tonight Show Superlatives; Tonight Show 12 Days of Christmas Sweaters; Tonight Show Stocking Stuffers; Thank You Notes; Capital Punishment album Road Kill, Jimmy plays song "Delta Time"; Ben Stiller gets a visit from Hashtag the Panda; Hashtag the Panda is Chris Rock; Brie Larson and Jimmy start a conga line
185	December 22, 2014	Chris Pine, David Oyelowo, Bobby Flay	N/A
Tariq makes potato pancakes; Jimmy Fallon, One Direction & The Roots sing "Santa Claus is Coming to Town" with classroom instruments; Tonight Show 12 Days of Christmas Sweaters; Tonight Show Stocking Stuffers; Battleshots (Chris Pine)
186	December 23, 2014	Jerry Seinfeld, One Direction	Big Sean featuring E-40
Ice skaters wipe out; Tonight Show 12 Days of Christmas Sweaters; Tonight Show Stocking Stuffers; Jerry Seinfeld did a stand-up comedy bit; Jerry Seinfeld gives Jimmy an award; Big Sean featuring E-40 performed "I Don't Fuck with You"
