= Kindergarten (TV series) =

- Genre: Documentary
- Directed by: Karen Goodman; Kirk Simon
- Narrated by: Oliver Simon
- Opening theme: "Hush Little Baby" by Bobby McFerrin and Yo-Yo Ma
- Composers: Kathy Jo Barrett; David Grover; Terry Hall; Mark Kelso; Charlie Tokarz
- Country of origin: United States
- Original language: English
- No. of seasons: 1
- No. of episodes: 13

Production
- Executive producers: Dolores Morris; Bill Chase
- Producers: Nancy Baker; Sarah Safer
- Production location: Upper Nyack, New York
- Cinematography: Greg Andracke; Buddy Squires; Gary Steele
- Editors: Nancy Baker; Bruce Shaw
- Production companies: Simon & Goodman Picture Company

Original release
- Network: HBO Family
- Release: August 26 – September 7, 2001

Kindergarten is a US children’s documentary miniseries that debuted in 2001 on HBO Family's Jam morning block. The unscripted show follows 23 students in a kindergarten class at the Upper Nyack Elementary School in Upper Nyack, New York.

== Cast ==
=== Adult Characters ===
(Played as themselves):

Ms. Jennifer Vaz Johnson- Main Teacher

Mrs. Mary Ann Matheson- Assistant Teacher to Ms. Johnson

Mr. Buzz Ostrowsky- The Principal

Lara's Mom and Dad

Amanda's Mom

Santa Claus (appeared in Hooray for Holidays only)

Joelle's Mom

=== Child Cast ===
Aaron
Amanda
Anna
Anna Belle
Ben
Carly
Christopher
Conor
Dana
Jillian
Joelle
Jonas
Julia
Julian
Karimah
Lara
Lauren
Matthew
Nat
Nicola
Quincy
Tyeese
William

== Episodes ==
No. in series	Title	Original release date
1	"Welcome to Kindergarten"	August 26, 2001
The class is introduced for the first time as it is the first day of kindergarten.
2	"Open Wide"	August 27, 2001
Some of the kids lost their first tooth and they all learn about teeth and how to take care of them.
3	"Spread Your Wings"	August 28, 2001
The class raises their own butterflies.
4	"A New Season"	August 29, 2001
The class talks about different seasons of the year.
5	"'F' Is For…"	August 30, 2001
The class thinks of and does things that begin with the letter F, such as making food and going to the fire station.
6	"One Fast Cookie"	August 31, 2001
The class re-enacts the story of the gingerbread man.
7	"Hooray for Holidays"	September 1, 2001
The class celebrates the holidays.
8	"Doin' the Right Thing"	September 2, 2001
The class learns about being polite to others.
9	"Many Kinds of Kindness"	September 3, 2001
The class has a "kindness day" in order for them to learn about how to be kind to others.
10	"Be My Valentine"	September 4, 2001
The class receives valentines from each other on Valentine's Day.
11	"As I Grow"	September 5, 2001
The class celebrates Lara's 5th birthday.
12	"How Does Your Garden Grow?"	September 6, 2001
The class plants in their school garden.
13	"Movin' Up"	September 7, 2001
Today is the last day of kindergarten for the children as they say goodbye and spend one last day in their classroom.

== Home media ==
A complete series 4-volume tape set was released on August 13, 2002.

The series was later released on HBO Max.
