= Spontaneous Inventions =

Live album by Bobby McFerrin
- Released: 1986
- Genre: Vocal jazz
- Length: 39:16
- Label: Blue Note Records
- Producers: Linda Goldstein, Bobby McFerrin

Bobby McFerrin chronology
The Voice (1984)	Spontaneous Inventions (1986)	Simple Pleasures (1988)

Professional ratings
Review scores
Source	Rating
Allmusic	4.5/5 stars
Record Mirror	2/5

Spontaneous Inventions is a 1986 live album by American vocalist Bobby McFerrin, released by Blue Note Records.

The album reached number 103 on the Billboard 200, number 62 on Billboard's R&B Albums chart, number 6 on the Top Jazz Albums chart, and number 2 on the Top Contemporary Jazz Albums chart.

The album features special guests, amongst them Robin Williams (vocals on "Beverly Hills Blues") and Herbie Hancock (piano on "Turtle Shoes").

McFerrin later performed a modified version of the song Thinkin' About Your Body in a series of UK Cadbury's chocolate adverts in 1989/1990.

== Track listing ==
No.	Title	Writer(s)	Length
1.	"Thinkin' About Your Body" (for Debs)	Robert McFerrin Jr.	3:15
2.	"Turtle Shoes"	McFerrin, Herbert Hancock	3:34
3.	"From Me to You"	Lennon–McCartney	2:19
4.	"There Ya Go"	McFerrin	3:40
5.	"Cara Mia"	McFerrin	4:54
6.	"Another Night in Tunisia"	John Gillespie, Jon Hendricks, Frank Paparelli	4:14
7.	"Opportunity"	Joan Armatrading	3:53
8.	"Walkin'"	Richard Carpenter	5:39
9.	"I Hear Music"	Burton Lane, Frank Loesser	3:54
10.	"Beverly Hills Blues"	McFerrin, Robin Williams	3:52
11.	"Mañana Iguana"	McFerrin	2:20

== Personnel ==
- Cheryl Bentyne – Vocal Arrangement, Vocals
- Bruce Botnick, Judy Clapp, Leslie Ann Jones, Elliot Scheiner – Engineer
- Linda Goldstein, Tim Hauser – Producer
- Herbie Hancock – Piano
- Tim Hauser, Jon Hendricks, Janis Siegel, Robin Williams – Vocals
- Mary Mack – Photography
- The Manhattan Transfer – Group, Vocals
- Bobby McFerrin – Bass, Percussion, Producer, Vocal Arrangement, Vocals
- Paula Scher – Design
- Rhonda Schoen – Digital Editing
- Wayne Shorter – Sax (Soprano)
- Jack Skinner – Mastering
