= Don't Worry, Be Happy (album) =

Compilation album by Bobby McFerrin
- Released: 1988
- Length: 43:05
- Label: EMI

Bobby McFerrin chronology
| Simple Pleasures (1988) | Don't Worry, Be Happy (1988) | How the Rhino Got Its Skin/How the Camel Got Its Hump (1990) |

Don't Worry, Be Happy is a compilation album by Bobby McFerrin.

Professional ratings
Review scores
| Source | Rating |
|---|---|
| Allmusic | link |

== Track listing ==
All tracks composed by Bobby McFerrin, except where indicated.

1. "Don't Worry, Be Happy" – 4:51
2. "Turtle Shoes" (McFerrin, Herbie Hancock) – 3:34
3. "Another Night in Tunisia" (Dizzy Gillespie, Jon Hendricks, Frank Paparelli) – 4:14
4. "Even for Me" (McFerrin, Chick Corea) – 6:37
5. "Mañana Iguana" – 2:23
6. "Drive" – 3:57
7. "I Hear Music" (Frank Loesser, Burton Lane) – 3:54
8. "Walkin'" (Richard Carpenter) – 5:38
9. "'Round Midnight" (Cootie Williams, Thelonious Monk, Bernie Hanighen) – 7:57

== Personnel ==
- Chick Corea – performer on "Even for Me" and "'Round Midnight"
- Jon Hendricks – performer on "Another Night in Tunisia"
- The Manhattan Transfer – performer on "Another Night in Tunisia"
- Bobby McFerrin – percussion, vocals
