= Play (Chick Corea and Bobby McFerrin album) =

1992 live album by Bobby McFerrin and Chick Corea

Live album by Bobby McFerrin and Chick Corea
- Released: January 1992
- Recorded: June 23 and 27, 1990
- Venues: The Barns of Wolftrap, Vienna, Virginia; Carnegie Hall, New York City
- Genre: Jazz
- Length: 49:53
- Label: Blue Note
- Producers: Linda Goldstein, Chick Corea, Bobby McFerrin

Bobby McFerrin chronology
Medicine Music (1990)	Play (1992)	Hush (1992)

Chick Corea chronology
Beneath the Mask (1991)	Play (1992)	Paint the World (1993)

Professional ratings
Review scores
Source	Rating
Allmusic	2.5/5.0 stars
Entertainment Weekly	(B−)

Play is the first collaborative album by Bobby McFerrin and Chick Corea.

== Track listing ==
1. "Spain" (Chick Corea, Joaquín Rodrigo) – 10:12
2. "Even From Me" (Bobby McFerrin, Chick Corea) – 6:34
3. "Autumn Leaves" (Jacques Prévert, Johnny Mercer, Joseph Kosma) – 11:41
4. "Blues Connotation" (Ornette Coleman) – 7:13
5. "'Round Midnight" (Bernie Hanighen, Cootie Williams, Thelonious Monk) – 7:59
6. "Blue Bossa" (Kenny Dorham) – 6:14

== Personnel ==
Musicians

- Bobby McFerrin – vocals
- Chick Corea – grand piano

Production

- Linda Goldstein – producer
- Bobby McFerrin – producer
- Chick Corea – producer
- Ron Moss – associate producer
- Bernie Kirsh – recording
- Chris Tergesen – recording, mixing
- Matthew LaMonica – mix assistant
- John Harris – location recording engineer
- Adam Pinch – location recording engineer
- Dan Vicari – house mixing
- The Power Station (New York, NY) – mixing location
- Greg Calbi – mastering at Sterling Sound (New York, NY)
- Cynthia Cochrane – art direction
- Patrick Roques – design
- Mark Rosenthal – illustration
