= Bobby McFerrin (album) =

Studio album by Bobby McFerrin
- Released: 1982
- Genre: Jazz
- Length: 41:12
- Label: Elektra/Musician
- Producer: Linda Goldstein

Bobby McFerrin chronology
Bobby McFerrin (1982)	The Voice (1984)

Professional ratings
Review scores
Source	Rating
AllMusic	3/5 stars
The Rolling Stone Jazz Record Guide	4/5 stars

Bobby McFerrin is the debut album by Bobby McFerrin, released in 1982. "You've Really Got A Hold On Me" (b/w "All Feets Can Dance") and "Moondance" (b/w "Jubilee") were released as singles in the US.

== Track listing ==
All songs written by Bobby McFerrin except where noted

1. "Dance with Me" (Johanna Hall, John Hall) – 4:08
2. "Feline" – 5:08
3. "You've Really Got a Hold on Me" (Smokey Robinson) – 3:53 (duet with Phoebe Snow)
4. "Moondance" (Van Morrison) – 5:20
5. "All Feets Can Dance" – 2:15
6. "Sightless Bird" – 6:26
7. "Peace" (Horace Silver) – 4:38
8. "Jubilee" – 4:49
9. "Hallucinations" (Bud Powell) – 2:21
10. "Chicken" – 3:14

== Personnel ==
- Bobby McFerrin – vocals, backing vocals, Fender Rhodes, arrangements, liner notes
- H. B. Bennett – drums
- Joe Caro – guitar
- Steve Erquiaga – guitar
- Stu Feldman – bass
- Victor Feldman – piano, Fender Rhodes
- John Guerin – drums
- Randy Jackson – bass
- Kenny Karsh – guitar
- Larry Klein – bass
- Peter Maunu – guitar
- Kenneth Nash – percussion
- James Preston – drums
- John Siegler – bass
- Phoebe Snow – vocals
- Frank Vilardi – drums

=== Production ===
- Nicholas Ten Broeck – Arranger
- Ron Coro – Art Direction
- Bert de Coteaux – Executive Producer
- Maureen Droney – Assistant Engineer
- David Frazer – Assistant Engineer
- Linda Goldstein – Producer
- Jerry Hudgins – Engineer
- Leslie Ann Jones – Engineer, Mixing
- Ken Kessie – Engineer
- Kosh – Design
- Fred Miller – Engineer
- Roger Ressmeyer – Photography
- Elliot Scheiner – Engineer
- Paul Stubblebine – Mastering

== Chart performance ==
Year	Chart	Position
1982	US Billboard Jazz Albums	41
