= Medicine Music =

Studio album by Bobby McFerrin
- Released: 1990
- Genre: Vocal, jazz
- Length: 48:55
- Language: English
- Label: EMI
- Producer: Bobby McFerrin

Bobby McFerrin chronology
How the Rhino Got His Skin/How the Camel Got His Hump (1990)	Medicine Music (1990)	Play (1992)

Professional ratings
Review scores
Source	Rating
AllMusic	2/5 stars
Chicago Tribune	3/4 stars
The Encyclopedia of Popular Music	3/5 stars
The Rolling Stone Album Guide	3.5/5 stars

Medicine Music is the third studio album by Bobby McFerrin, released in 1990. The album reached number 146 on the Billboard 200 and number 2 on the Top Contemporary Jazz Albums chart.

The album was nominated for a 1991 Grammy Award, in the "Best Contemporary Jazz Performance" category.

== Production ==
Voicestra, a 10-member a capella group formed by McFerrin, and Robert McFerrin, Bobby's father, appear on the album. "Common Threads" served as the theme song to the documentary Common Threads: Stories from the Quilt. McFerrin wrote all of the songs on Medicine Music. The lyrics to "Discipline" are based on several verses of the chapter Hebrews 12 from the New Testament, while the lyrics to "The 23rd Psalm" are based on Psalm 23 from the Old Testament.

== Critical reception ==
The Los Angeles Times wrote that "McFerrin sings splendidly, his intonation never faltering as he goes from throbbing bass notes to a soaring, light falsetto." The Austin American-Statesman wrote that "McFerrin's penchant for unusual vocal innovation is present throughout the album, but it is the songs without words, nominally called instrumentals in the McFerrin musical universe, that are the most challenging."

== Track listing ==
No.	Title	Length
1.	"Medicine Man"	4:19
2.	"Baby"	3:02
3.	"Yes, You"	3:13
4.	"The Garden"	3:26
5.	"Common Threads" (theme song from the documentary)	4:16
6.	"Sweet in the Morning" (Featuring Voicestra)	4:57
7.	"Discipline" (Featuring Robert McFerrin and Voicestra)	4:40
8.	"He Ran All the Way"	4:05
9.	"Angry (Gima)"	3:45
10.	"The Train"	6:16
11.	"Soma So De La Sase"	4:00
12.	"The 23rd Psalm"	3:08

All music and lyrics composed by Bobby McFerrin; ©ProbNoblem Music/BMI - except "The 23rd Psalm" (Music: Bobby McFerrin/English text arranged by Bobby McFerrin; ©ProbNoblem Music/BMI)
