= Premiere (The Tonight Show Starring Jimmy Fallon) =

Episode 1
- The Tonight Show Starring; Jimmy Fallon episode
- Episode no.: Season 1 Episode 1
- Original air date: February 17, 2014

Guest appearances
- Will Smith; See list of cameos in $100 bet segment

Episode chronology
← Previous —	Next → "Episode 2 (February 18, 2014)"
- List of The Tonight Show Starring Jimmy Fallon episodes (2014)

The untitled debut episode of American late-night talk show The Tonight Show Starring Jimmy Fallon is the first episode to air in 2014, and the first episode of the series overall. The debut episode originally aired in the United States on February 17, 2014 on NBC.

== Synopsis ==
The Tonight Show Starring Jimmy Fallon premiered on February 17, 2014, following NBC's coverage of the Winter Olympics (the show started at midnight, past its usual 11:35 start time, as a result). Fallon strolled out to applause, making light jokes referencing the storied franchise's host debacle of four years prior. He introduced his supporting stars and gave a brief history of his life and career, thanking his parents (who were in the audience) and the 5 previous Tonight Show hosts (Steve Allen, Jack Paar, Johnny Carson, Jay Leno, and Conan O'Brien) and explaining how his nightly monologue would work. Following this, he once again took his place behind the curtain, restarting the show with more topical jokes on the Olympics and his first bit, Tonight Show Superlatives (an extension of a similarly titled bit from his Late Night tenure).

After taking his place behind the desk for the first time, Fallon took a moment to chide a friend who once bet him $100 he would never host The Tonight Show. After this, Robert De Niro emerged from behind the curtain, laid $100 down on Fallon's desk, and promptly exited; De Niro was Fallon's first guest on Late Night in 2009. Then, one by one, a line of celebrities followed to give Jimmy their $100, including Tina Fey, Joe Namath, former New York City Mayor Rudy Giuliani (who can be heard thanking Fallon for bringing Tonight back to the Big Apple), Mariah Carey, Tracy Morgan, Joan Rivers (a former guest host on Johnny Carson's Tonight making her first appearance on Tonight since falling out with Carson in the mid-1980s), Kim Kardashian, Seth Rogen, Lindsay Lohan, Sarah Jessica Parker, Mike Tyson, Lady Gaga, and late-night rival Stephen Colbert who came in character. Colbert, the last to pay up, offered his $100 by dumping a bucket of pennies on Fallon, greeting him to the same time slot as his then current show, The Colbert Report, shouting "Welcome to 11:30, bitch!" to Fallon, and taking a selfie with him that he later posted to his Twitter feed.

Following the first commercial break, guest Will Smith and Fallon launched into a pre-taped sketch titled "The Evolution of Hip-Hop Dancing," rotating through various synchronized moves such as the Robot, the Humpty Dance, the Dougie and more; when Fallon begins to twerk, Smith walks offstage in disgust. The next segment took place at the Top of the Rock, the roof of the 30 Rockefeller Plaza, with U2 performing their new single "Invisible" to the Manhattan skyline as the sun set. The rooftop staging was devised by executive producer Lorne Michaels the previous Wednesday, with its odd placement in the middle of the show to take advantage of the sunset. Next, Fallon welcomed Smith for the interview, with topics ranging from his parody of Willow Smith's "Whip My Hair" as Neil Young, and Smith's recent skydiving endeavor. U2 then returned and took their places on the couch for a short interview and an acoustic rendition of their single "Ordinary Love," accompanied by The Roots. Fallon ecstatically closed the show and ran through the audience, high-fiving fans and seeking out his parents in the audience.

== Reception ==
=== Critical reviews ===
The debut episode received generally positive reviews. The New York Times's Alessandra Stanley referred to the show's premiere as "more sweet than sassy," calling Fallon "the grateful heir, the eager freshman, the class clown with top grades and a good heart, someone older viewers can embrace without fear of being mocked or overlooked." Steve Johnson of the Chicago Tribune wrote that "If he didn't exactly come roaring out of the gate, Fallon did demonstrate the mixture of old-world courteousness, junior-high-school goofiness and seemingly unending enthusiasm that has charmed audiences, network bosses and fellow stars." Darren Franich of Entertainment Weekly wrote that "No one is more excited than Jimmy," noting that "It will be interesting to see over the months (and hopefully years) to follow how he evolves behind the desk." Robert Bianco of USA Today praised Fallon's "easy-to-like TV persona [and] gentle style," calling the host well-suited to the format.

Tim Goodman of The Hollywood Reporter was positive in his assessment of the evening, but noted the older fanbase used to Leno may not latch on as quickly. James Poniewozik of Time found Fallon's introduction, including his background and "incredibly brilliant [...] So each introduction Fallon made was a chance to frame the story, from the beginning, in a way that could make these longtime Tonight viewers—many of them older—comfortable with him, even while he hopefully brought in new ones."

Some critics, however, felt that Fallon overcompensated in terms of gratitude and humility. Bianco also said, "While gratitude and humility are admirable traits, there were times in Monday's opening moments when Fallon risked taking them to uncomfortable extremes." Slate Magazine's Willa Paskin tended to agree, noting that "Fallon's appeal is how earnest and energetic he is: the king of comedic kindness. [...] But his opening bit revealed just how much Fallon and his staff understand the power—and not just the authenticity—of Jimmy’s ultimate-nice-guy persona: They sold the hell out of it." "Indeed, Fallon comes across as eager to please almost to a fault, and he treated his Tonight Show launch very much like a guy auditioning to be accepted into homes," said Brian Lowry of Variety, who considered the premiere episode a demonstration in Fallon's strengths and weaknesses. Mary McNamara of the Los Angeles Times called it, following the hype, "conspicuously, and seemingly consciously, low-energy."

=== Ratings ===
The debut episode of The Tonight Show Starring Jimmy Fallon averaged a 3.8 rating in adults 18–49 and 11.31 million viewers overall in Nielsen's fast-national estimates. This made it the second-largest audience for The Tonight Show since May 2009, behind Leno's final farewell two weeks earlier, and the transition to Conan O'Brien nearly five years prior. The program's first full week averaged 8.490 million viewers, making it the franchise's most-watched week in 20 years.
