= The Voice (Bobby McFerrin album) =

Live album by Bobby McFerrin
- Released: 1984
- Recorded: March 17–26, 1984
- Venue: Liederhalle (Stuttgart); Musikhalle (Hamburg); Rosengarten (Mannheim); Club Bahnhof Ehrenfeld (Cologne)
- Genre: Jazz, acappella
- Length: 43:12
- Label: Elektra/Musician

Bobby McFerrin chronology
Bobby McFerrin (1982)	The Voice (1984)	Spontaneous Inventions (1986)

Professional ratings
Review scores
Source	Rating
AllMusic	5/5 stars
The Rolling Stone Jazz Record Guide	4/5 stars
The Village Voice	B−

The Voice is a live album by vocalist Bobby McFerrin that was released in 1984. This was the first album by a jazz singer to be recorded without accompaniment or overdubbing.

== Background ==
When McFerrin's album was released in 1984, it was exceptional for several reasons. The use of computers, synthesizers, and electronics in music was on the rise while McFerrin relied solely on his voice. One of the songs on the album is called "I'm My Own Walkman". He fit in the tradition of bebop vocalists for whom sound dominated lyrics and who imitated the sounds of saxophones and trumpets. But like Al Jarreau, he went beyond them by imitating all the instruments: drums, bass, flute, horns, guitar. He thumped his chest with his hands for percussive effects. He was the first jazz singer to sing while inhaling in addition to exhaling. He gave concerts as a soloist without instrumental accompaniment. His vocal styles varied, too, sometimes within one song in which he sang improvised lines with quick changes in register, falsetto, pops, grunts, while maintaining melody, harmony, and rhythm. One should also note his range. He is the son of an opera singer. He was voted Best Male Vocalist in DownBeat magazine in 1984 and 1985.

== Track listing ==
All tracks are written by Bobby McFerrin except where noted.

No.	Title	Writer(s)	Length
1.	"Blackbird"	John Lennon; Paul McCartney	3:07
2.	"The Jump"		4:48
3.	"El Brujo"		4:11
4.	"I Feel Good"	James Brown	3:19
5.	"I'm My Own Walkman"		4:02
6.	"Music Box"		3:56
7.	"Medley: Donna Lee/Big Top/We're in the Money"	Charlie Parker/Bobby McFerrin/Al Dubin; Harry Warren	7:22
8.	"I'm Alone"		4:41
9.	"T.J."		3:48
10.	"Take the "A" Train"	Billy Strayhorn	3:58

== Personnel ==
- Bobby McFerrin – vocals

== Production ==
- Linda Goldstein – producer
- Steve Addabbo – engineer
- Carlos Albrecht – engineer
- Stephen Innocenzi – editing
- Gene Paul – digital editing
- Jack Skinner – mastering
