= Circlesongs =

Studio album by Bobby McFerrin
- Released: April 1, 1997
- Studio: The Hit Factory (New York, NY)
- Genre: Vocal jazz
- Length: 42:29
- Label: Sony Classical
- Producer: Linda Goldstein

Professional ratings
Review scores
Source	Rating
Allmusic	4/5 stars

Circlesongs is the seventh studio album by American vocalist Bobby McFerrin, released by Sony Classical.

In 2018, McFerrin toured with his ensemble the Voicestra, performing material from Circlesongs, as well as improvisational works with audience improvisation encouraged.

The music on the album is performed by "circle singing", an improvisational technique created by McFerrin in 1986. In circle singing, a leader in a circle of singers directs one sub-group in the circle to sing an improvised musical part, and then the leader improvises another part for another sub-group to sing overlaid onto the first part, and so on until the whole circle is singing different improvised parts. The song evolves as the leader changes the improvisation for different groups.

== Track listing ==
1. "Circlesong One" - 6:10
2. "Circlesong Two" - 4:11
3. "Circlesong Three" - 4:40
4. "Circlesong Four" - 4:27
5. "Circlesong Five" - 5:27
6. "Circlesong Six" - 7:50
7. "Circlesong Seven" - 4:57
8. "Circlesong Eight" - 4:47

== Personnel ==
- Bobby McFerrin – vocals, vocal leader
- Voicestra (Nicolas Bearde, Joey Blake, Pierre Cook, Sussan Deyhim, Kirsten Falke, Paul Hillier, Raz Kennedy, Beth Quist, Rhiannon, Janis Siegel, Pamela Warrick Smith and David Worm) – vocal ensemble

=== Production ===
- Linda Goldstein – producer
- Chris Tergesen – engineer, mixing
- Tony Black – assistant engineer
- Greg Pinto – assistant engineer
- Greg Thompson – assistant engineer
- George Marino – mastering at Sterling Sound (New York, NY)
- Philip Rackin – production coordinator
- Katie Steams – production coordinator
- Kerstin Bach – package design
- Gil Gilbert – photography
- Nathalie Schüller – photography
