= Simple Pleasures (Bobby McFerrin album) =

Studio album by Bobby McFerrin
- Released: August 5, 1988
- Recorded: 1987–88
- Studios: Power Station, New York City; Fantasy, Berkeley, California
- Genres: Vocal; a cappella; jazz-pop
- Length: 33:50
- Label: Manhattan
- Producers: Linda Goldstein, Bobby McFerrin

Bobby McFerrin chronology
Elephant's Child (1987)	Simple Pleasures (1988)	Don't Worry, Be Happy (1988)

Singles from Simple Pleasures
- 1. "Don't Worry, Be Happy" Released: July 24, 1988

Professional ratings
Review scores
Source	Rating
AllMusic	4/5 stars
The Village Voice	B−

Simple Pleasures is the second studio album by American singer and musician Bobby McFerrin, released on August 5, 1988, by Manhattan Records.

The album was McFerrin's commercial breakthrough and contained the hit single "Don't Worry, Be Happy". The song was featured in the film Cocktail and peaked at No. 1 for two weeks on the Billboard Hot 100. "Don't Worry, Be Happy" won the 1988 Grammy Awards for Song of the Year, Record of the Year, and Best Male Pop Vocal Performance.

Simple Pleasures spent 55 weeks on the Billboard 200 in the U.S., peaking at No. 5. On September 26, 1988, the album was certified Platinum by the Recording Industry Association of America.

The album features unaccompanied a cappella singing, with all parts performed exclusively by McFerrin via overdubbing.

== Track listing ==
All tracks are written by Bobby McFerrin, except where noted.

Side one
No.	Title	Writer(s)	Length
1.	"Don't Worry, Be Happy"		4:54
2.	"All I Want"		2:56
3.	"Drive My Car"	Lennon–McCartney	2:44
4.	"Simple Pleasures"		2:08
5.	"Good Lovin'"	Rudy Clark, Artie Resnick	2:58

Side two
No.	Title	Writer(s)	Length
1.	"Come to Me"		3:38
2.	"Susie-Q"	Eleanor Broadwater, Dale Hawkins, Stan Lewis	2:50
3.	"Drive"		3:58
4.	"Them Changes"	Buddy Miles	3:55
5.	"Sunshine of Your Love"	Pete Brown, Jack Bruce, Eric Clapton	3:43

== Personnel ==
- Bobby McFerrin – all vocals

Technical

- Linda Goldstein – co-producer
- Bobby McFerrin – co-producer
- Chris Tergesen – engineer
- Gary Solomon – assistant engineer
- Matthew La Monica – assistant engineer
- Don Rodenbach – assistant engineer
- Dave Luke – assistant engineer
- Jack Skinner – mastering
- Henry Marquez – art direction
- Carol Friedman – photography

== Charts ==
=== Weekly charts ===
Chart (1988)	Peak position
Australian Albums (ARIA)	26
Austrian Albums (Ö3 Austria)	8
German Albums (Offizielle Top 100)	13
New Zealand Albums (RMNZ)	17
Swedish Albums (Sverigetopplistan)	35
Swiss Albums (Schweizer Hitparade)	14
UK Albums (Official Charts)	92
US Billboard 200	5
US Top R&B/Hip-Hop Albums (Billboard)	12

=== Year-end charts ===
Chart (1988)	Position
US Billboard 200	58
US Top R&B/Hip-Hop Albums (Billboard)	76

Chart (1989)	Position
German Albums (Offizielle Top 100)	91

== Certifications ==
Certifications for Simple Pleasures
Region	Certification	Certified units/sales
Canada (Music Canada)	Gold	50,000^{^}
Switzerland (IFPI Switzerland)	Gold	25,000^{^}
United States (RIAA)	Platinum	1,000,000^{^}
^{^} Shipments figures based on certification alone.
