= Don't Worry, Be Happy =

Single by Bobby McFerrin

from the album Simple Pleasures
- Released: July 24, 1988
- Studio: Fantasy, Berkeley, California
- Genre: Reggae; jazz; pop
- Length: 4:55 (album version); 4:03 (music video version); 3:50 (radio edit)
- Label: EMI-Manhattan
- Songwriter: Bobby McFerrin
- Producer: Linda Goldstein

Music video
- "Don't Worry, Be Happy" on YouTube

"Don't Worry, Be Happy" is a 1988 song by Bobby McFerrin, released as the lead single from his album Simple Pleasures (1988). It was the first a cappella song to reach number-one on the Billboard Hot 100 chart, a position it held for two weeks. Released in conjunction with the film Cocktail, the song peaked at number one on September 24, 1988, displacing "Sweet Child o' Mine" by Guns N' Roses.

The song also peaked at number 11 on the Billboard Hot Black Singles chart and number seven on the Billboard Hot Adult Contemporary Tracks chart. It hit number one in Australia and stayed there for seven weeks. The song was also a hit in the United Kingdom, reaching number two during its fifth week on the UK Singles Chart. In Canada, "Don't Worry, Be Happy" reached number one in its eighth week. One critic noted it as a "formula for facing life's trials". At the 1989 Grammy Awards, "Don't Worry, Be Happy" won the awards for Song of the Year, Record of the Year, and Best Male Pop Vocal Performance.

In 2024, the single was selected for preservation in the United States National Recording Registry by the Library of Congress as being "culturally, historically, or aesthetically significant".

== Background ==
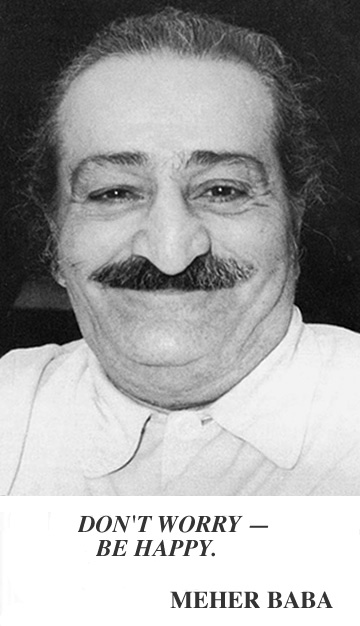
Meher Baba, who often used the phrase "Don't worry, be happy, and I will help you."

Indian spiritual Guru Meher Baba (1894–1969) often used the expression "Don't worry, be happy, and I will help you" when communicating with his followers in the West, and the expression was printed on inspirational cards and posters during the 1960s. In 1988, McFerrin noticed a similar poster in the apartment of jazz duo Tuck & Patti in San Francisco, and he was inspired by the expression's charm and simplicity. He wrote and recorded the song for his album Simple Pleasures and it was included in the soundtrack of the movie Cocktail, which subsequently led to it becoming a hit single the next year.

== Composition and recording ==
The "instruments" in the a cappella song are entirely overdubbed voice parts and other sounds made by McFerrin, using no instruments at all; McFerrin also sings with an affected accent, though he stated that "I hate to go so far as to say it's Jamaican. It was heavily influenced by Juan's Mexican Restaurant, which was just around the corner from the studio." "Don't Worry, Be Happy" is written in the key of B major.

"Don't Worry, Be Happy" (1988)
A 24-second audio sample of Bobby McFerrin's "Don't Worry, Be Happy".

The song was recorded by McFerrin at Fantasy Studios in Berkeley, California, using only eight tracks. McFerrin sang his vocal parts into his preferred microphone, a Neumann U 87.

== Critical reception ==
Kieran McCarthy of AllMusic expected that the song would "probably remain prevalent in pop culture as long as humans speak English and play music." Pan-European magazine Music & Media picked it as Single of the Week, writing "Cool a capella by this unusual artist. Uncomplicated music stripped down to the basics, but missing absolutely nothing. This recording will appeal to everybody who is on the lookout for something different. With the reggae-style vocals and a snappy rhythm, this Linda Goldstein produced US top 10 single is a novelty record of considerable substance."

== Music video ==
The music video for the song is playful and comedic in nature. Directed by Drew Takahashi, it features McFerrin, Robin Williams, and Bill Irwin engaging in various humorous antics while cutting back and forth to McFerrin singing along with the lyrics, and is somewhat shorter than the album version.

== Personnel ==
- Bobby McFerrin - vocals

== Awards ==
At the 1989 Grammy Awards, "Don't Worry, Be Happy" won the awards for Song of the Year, Record of the Year, and Best Male Pop Vocal Performance.

== Impact and legacy ==
The song is ranked No. 31 on VH1's "100 Greatest One-Hit Wonders of the '80s" and also appears on Rolling Stone's list of the 15 Best Whistling Songs of All Time. It was featured at #301 in the Recording Industry of America and the National Endowment for the Arts' 'Songs of the Century' in 2001.

However, in 2011, "Don't Worry, Be Happy" was named as the worst song of all time by Village Voice critic Michael Musto, and it topped Q100 DJ Bert Weiss's list of tracks he would forever ban from radio. In the "50 Worst Songs Ever", Blender wrote "it's difficult to think of a song more likely to plunge you into suicidal despondency than this" and it lambasted its "appalling" lyrics.

In late 1988, television station WTVJ (channel 4) in Miami, Florida, commissioned McFerrin to record a customized version of the song with lyrics promoting WTVJ's switch from CBS to NBC on January 1, 1989, as part of a complicated six-station affiliation shuffle in South Florida. The station's usage of the song was so infamous that when WTVJ's general manager resigned in 1993, South Florida Sun-Sentinel critic Tom Jicha wrote "The 'don't worry, be happy' era is officially over at WTVJ ... Practically speaking, it was over as soon as it started. The jingle ... never reflected reality ... there has been little to smile about and plenty to fret over."

Hip-Hop group Public Enemy mentions the song in their song "Fight the Power" in a negative way, and they rap "Damn if I say it you can slap me right here", using the lyric to reject the song's carefree, submissive message. They felt it encouraged complacency and pacified people at a time when systemic racism and social injustice required rage, action, and resistance.

== Charts ==
=== Weekly charts ===
Chart (1988–1989)	Peak position
Australia (ARIA)	1
Austria (Ö3 Austria Top 40)	1
Belgium (Ultratop 50 Flanders)	2
Canada Top Singles (RPM)	1
Canada 30 Retail Singles (RPM)	1
Denmark (IFPI)	2
Finland (Suomen virallinen lista)	4
France (SNEP)	29
Iceland (Íslenski Listinn Topp 10)	1
Ireland (IRMA)	3
Italy (Musica e dischi)	23
Italy Airplay (Music & Media)	4
Netherlands (Dutch Top 40)	2
Netherlands (Single Top 100)	3
New Zealand (Recorded Music NZ)	2
Norway (VG-lista)	5
South Africa (Springbok Radio)	4
Spain (AFYVE)	5
Sweden (Sverigetopplistan)	2
Switzerland (Schweizer Hitparade)	2
UK Singles (Official Charts)	2
US Billboard Hot 100	1
US Adult Contemporary (Billboard)	7
US Hot Black Singles (Billboard)	11
West Germany (GfK)	1

Chart (2016)	Peak position
Poland Airplay (ZPAV)	75

=== Year-end charts ===
Chart (1988)	Position
Australia (ARIA)	14
Belgium (Ultratop Flanders)	35
Canada Top Singles (RPM)	14
Netherlands (Dutch Top 40)	22
Netherlands (Single Top 100)	47
US Billboard Hot 100	37
West Germany (Official German Charts)	43

Chart (1989)	Position
Austria (Ö3 Austria Top 40)	30
Switzerland (Schweizer Hitparade)	26
West Germany (Official German Charts)	10

== Certifications and sales ==
Region	Certification	Certified units/sales
Australia	—	85,000
Denmark (IFPI Danmark)	Gold	45,000^{‡}
Germany (BVMI)	Platinum	500,000^{^}
Italy (FIMI)	Gold	50,000^{‡}
New Zealand (RMNZ)	2× Platinum	60,000^{‡}
Spain (Promusicae)	Gold	30,000^{‡}
Sweden (GLF)	Gold	25,000^{^}
United Kingdom (BPI)	Gold	400,000^{‡}
United States (RIAA)	Gold	500,000^{^}
^{^} Shipments figures based on certification alone.^{‡} Sales+streaming figures based on certification alone.

== Use by the George Bush campaign ==
The song was used in George H. W. Bush's 1988 U.S. presidential election as Bush's 1988 official presidential campaign song, and it was used without McFerrin's permission or endorsement. In reaction, McFerrin, a Democrat, publicly protested that particular use of his song, including stating that he was going to vote against Bush, and he completely dropped the song from his own performance repertoire to make the point even clearer. The Bush campaign then reportedly desisted from use of the song.

== See also ==
- Big Mouth Billy Bass, a toy which plays a version of this song
