= Hush (Yo-Yo Ma and Bobby McFerrin album) =

1992 studio album by Bobby McFerrin and Yo-Yo Ma

Studio album by Bobby McFerrin and Yo-Yo Ma
- Released: 1992
- Recorded: August 22, 1991 – August 25, 1991
- Studios: Dreamland (Hurley, New York); Different Fur (San Francisco, California); Power Station (New York City, New York)
- Genres: Classical, vocal jazz
- Length: 46:28
- Labels: Sony Masterworks (US); Sony Classical (international)
- Producers: Bobby McFerrin, Steven Epstein

Bobby McFerrin chronology
| Play (1992) | Hush (1992) | Bang!Zoom (1995) |

Yo-Yo Ma chronology
| Prokofiev: Sinfonia Concertante (1992) | Hush (1992) | Brahms: String Sextets, Opp. 18 & 36 (1992) |

Hush is a collaborative album by vocalist Bobby McFerrin and cellist Yo-Yo Ma. It was released on the Sony Masterworks label in 1992. The pair first met at a 1988 celebration of Leonard Bernstein.

The album peaked at No. 93 on the Billboard 200.

== Production ==
The album was produced by McFerrin and Steven Epstein. McFerrin wrote five of its songs; the collaborators adapted three Johann Sebastian Bach compositions. According to McFerrin, Ma was hesitant to improvise during the recording sessions.

== Critical reception ==
Professional ratings
Review scores
| Source | Rating |
|---|---|
| AllMusic | 4/5 stars |
| The Indianapolis Star | 2.5/4 stars |
| Vancouver Sun | 4/5 stars |

The Indianapolis Star wrote: "Apart from a rousing indulgence in country fiddle-music licks on 'Hoedown!', McFerrin's own compositions here lean toward the artfully overdubbed New Age." The St. Petersburg Times praised "the album's best track, McFerrin's beautifully melodic 'Stars'." The Washington Post admired "the winning combination of Ma's unerring, often deeply expressive touch and McFerrin's wit, whimsy, resourcefulness and sheer musicality."

== Track listing ==
1. "Grace" (McFerrin) – 3:54
2. "Double Mandolin Concerto in G, RV 532" Andante (Vivaldi) – 4:03
3. "The Flight of the Bumblebee" (Rimsky-Korsakov) – 1:08
4. "Stars" (McFerrin) – 4:04
5. "Hush Little Baby" (Trad.) – 2:36
6. "Vocalise," song for voice & piano, Op. 34/14 (Rachmaninov) – 6:26
7. "Musette for keyboard in D Major (AMN II/22; doubtful), BWV Anh. 126" (J. S. Bach) – 4:12
8. "Coyote" (McFerrin) – 2:52
9. "Sonata for 2 cellos, No. 10 in G Allegro: Prestissimo" (Barrière) – 2:36
10. "Ave Maria" (Gounod / J. S. Bach) – 2:37
11. "Hoedown!" (McFerrin) – 5:38
12. "Air" (Orchestral Suite No. 3 in D Major, BWV 1068) (J. S. Bach) – 5:11
13. "Good-bye" (McFerrin) – 1:11

== Personnel ==
- Yo-Yo Ma – cello
- Bobby McFerrin – vocals, arrangements (5)

Production

- Linda Goldstein – executive producer
- Steven Epstein – producer
- Bobby McFerrin – producer, liner notes
- Chris Tergesen – recording, mixing
- Ron Rigler – recording assistant
- John Yates – assistant engineer
- Aaron Krops – mix assistant
- Matthew LaMonica – mix assistant
- Bud Graham – mastering
- Julia Cohen – production coordinator
- Allen Weinberg – cover design
- Carol Friedman – cover photography
- Yo-Yo Ma – liner notes
