= Bobby McFerrin =

American singer and conductor (born 1950)

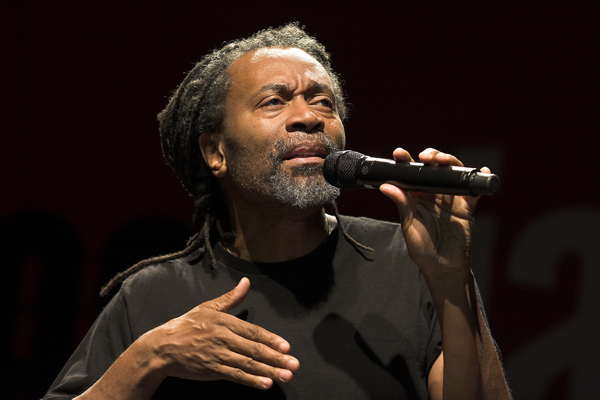
- McFerrin in 2011

Background information
- Born: Robert Keith McFerrin Jr. March 11, 1950 (age 76); Manhattan, New York, U.S.
- Genres: Jazz; a cappella; vocal; world; classical; vocal jazz
- Occupations: Singer-songwriter; conductor; arranger; record producer
- Instruments: Vocals; piano
- Years active: 1970–present
- Labels: Manhattan; Blue Note; Elektra; Sony Classical
- Website: bobbymcferrin.com circlesongs.com

Robert Keith McFerrin Jr. (born March 11, 1950) is an American improvisational vocal musician, singer, songwriter, and conductor. His vocal techniques include singing fluidly but with quick and considerable jumps in pitch—for example, sustaining a melody while also rapidly alternating with arpeggios and harmonies—as well as scat singing, polyphonic overtone singing, and improvisational vocal percussion. McFerrin performs and records regularly as an unaccompanied solo vocal artist and has frequently collaborated with other artists from both the jazz and classical scenes.

McFerrin's song "Don't Worry, Be Happy" is the only a cappella track to ever reach No. 1 in the US, which it reached in 1988 and additionally won Song of the Year and Record of the Year honors at the 1989 Grammy Awards. He has also worked in collaboration with jazz fusion instrumentalists including pianists Chick Corea (of Return to Forever), Herbie Hancock (of The Headhunters), and Joe Zawinul (of Weather Report), drummer Tony Williams, bassist/vocalist Richard Bona and cellist Yo-Yo Ma.

== Early life and education ==
Robert Keith McFerrin, Jr. was born in Manhattan, New York on March 11, 1950, the son of operatic baritone Robert McFerrin, who was the first African-American man to sing at America's flagship opera company – the Metropolitan Opera, and singer Sara Copper (1924–2019), who taught voice at Fullerton College in Southern California. He attended Cathedral High School in Los Angeles, Cerritos College, University of Illinois Springfield (then known as Sangamon State University) and California State University, Sacramento.

== Career ==
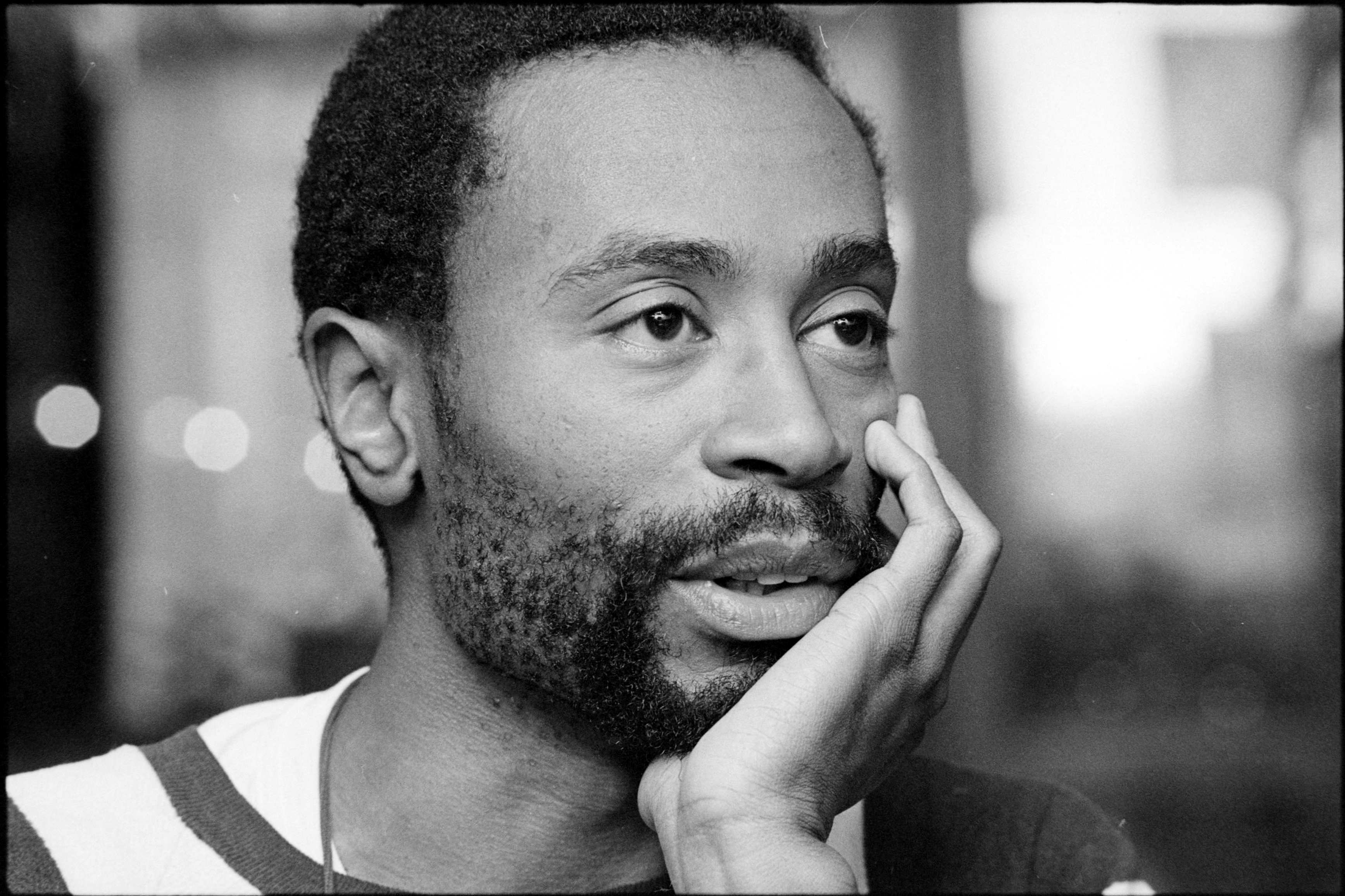
McFerrin in 1982

McFerrin's first recorded work, the self-titled album Bobby McFerrin, was not produced until 1982, when he was 31 years old. Before that, McFerrin had spent six years developing his musical style, the first two years of which he attempted not to listen to other singers at all, in order to avoid sounding like they sounded. McFerrin was influenced by Keith Jarrett, who had achieved great success with a series of solo improvised piano concerts, including The Köln Concert of 1975, and wanted to attempt something similar vocally.

In 1984, McFerrin performed at the Playboy Jazz Festival in Los Angeles as a sixth member of Herbie Hancock's VSOP II, sharing horn trio parts with the Marsalis brothers.

In 1986, McFerrin was the voice of Santa Bear in Santa Bear's First Christmas, and in 1987, he was the voice of Santa Bear/Bully Bear in the sequel Santa Bear's High Flying Adventure. On September 24 of that same year, McFerrin recorded the theme song for the opening credits of Season 4 of The Cosby Show.

In 1988, McFerrin recorded the song "Don't Worry, Be Happy", which became a hit and brought him widespread recognition across the world. It reached number one on the Billboard Hot 100 in 1988. The song's success "ended McFerrin's musical life as he had known it," and McFerrin began to pursue other musical possibilities on stage and in recording studios. The song was used as the official campaign song for George H. W. Bush in the 1988 U.S. presidential election, without McFerrin's permission or endorsement. In reaction, McFerrin publicly protested the use of his song and said that he was going to vote against Bush. McFerrin also dropped the song from his own performance repertoire.

In 1989, McFerrin composed and performed the music for the Pixar short film Knick Knack. The rough cut to which he recorded his vocals had the words "blah blah blah" in place of the end credits (meant to indicate that he should improvise). McFerrin decided to sing "blah blah blah" as lyrics, and the final version of the short film includes these lyrics during the end credits. Also in 1989, he formed a 10-person "Voicestra", which McFerrin featured on both his 1990 album Medicine Music and in the score to the 1989 Oscar-winning documentary Common Threads: Stories from the Quilt.

Around 1992, an urban legend began that McFerrin had committed suicide; it has been suggested that the false story spread because people enjoyed the irony of a man known for the positive message of "Don't Worry, Be Happy" suffering from depression in real life.

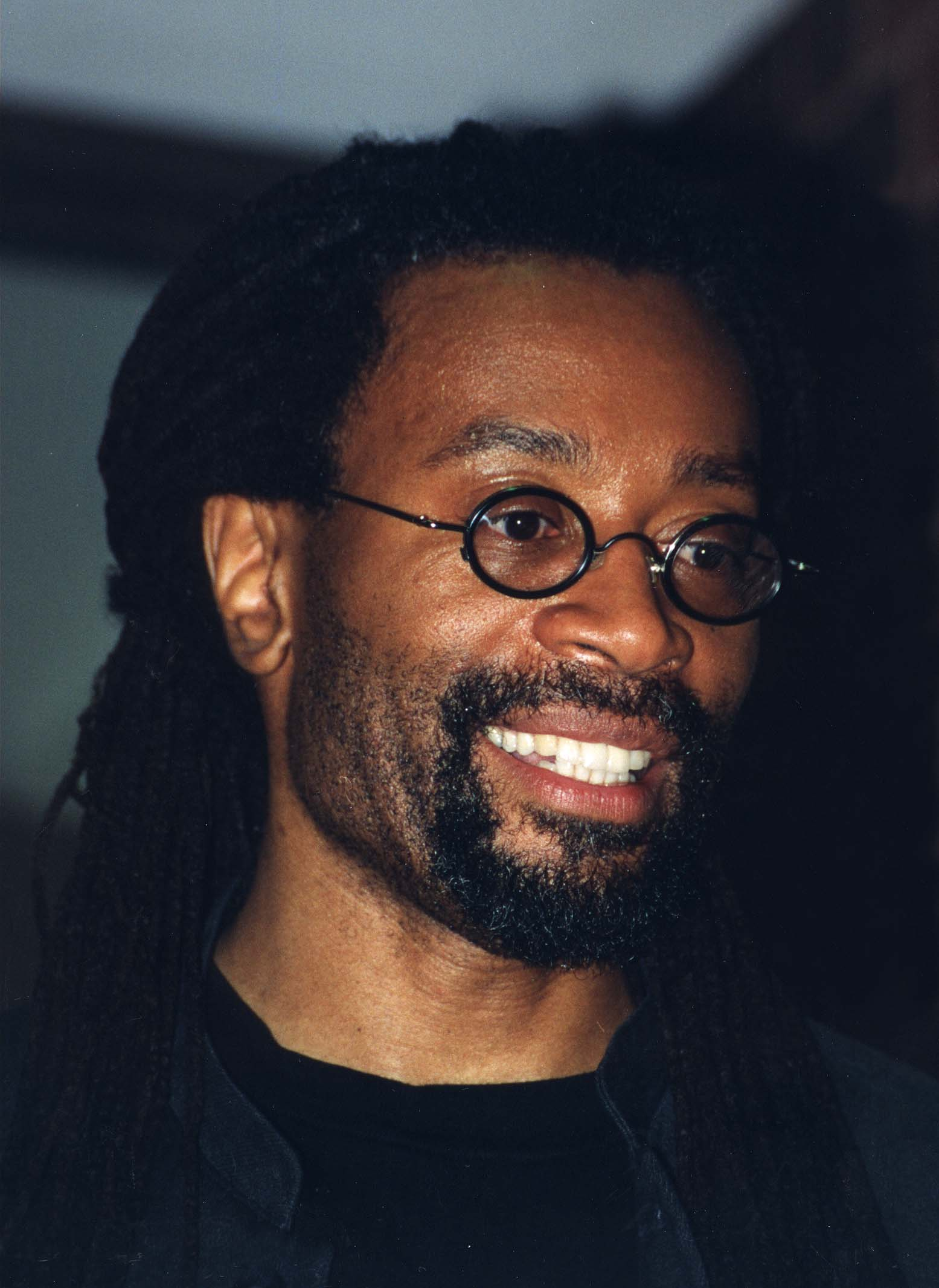
McFerrin in 1994

In 1993, McFerrin sang Henry Mancini's "Pink Panther Theme" for the 1993 comedy film Son of the Pink Panther. In addition to his vocal performing career, in 1994, McFerrin was appointed as creative chair of the Saint Paul Chamber Orchestra. He makes regular tours as a guest conductor for symphony orchestras throughout the United States and Canada, including the San Francisco Symphony (on his 40th birthday), the New York Philharmonic, the Chicago Symphony Orchestra, the Cleveland Orchestra, the Detroit Symphony Orchestra, the Israel Philharmonic Orchestra, the Philadelphia Orchestra, the Los Angeles Philharmonic, the London Philharmonic, the Vienna Philharmonic and many others. In McFerrin's concert appearances, he combines serious conducting of classical pieces with his own vocal improvisations, often with participation from the audience and the orchestra. For example, the concerts often end with McFerrin conducting the orchestra in an a cappella rendition of the "William Tell Overture," in which the orchestra members sing their musical parts in McFerrin's vocal style instead of playing their parts on their instruments.

For a few years in the late 1990s, McFerrin toured a concert version of Porgy and Bess. He said that his production was partly in honor of his father, who sang the role for Sidney Poitier in the 1959 film version, and partly "to preserve the score's jazziness" in the face of "largely white orchestras" who tend not "to play around the bar lines, to stretch and bend".

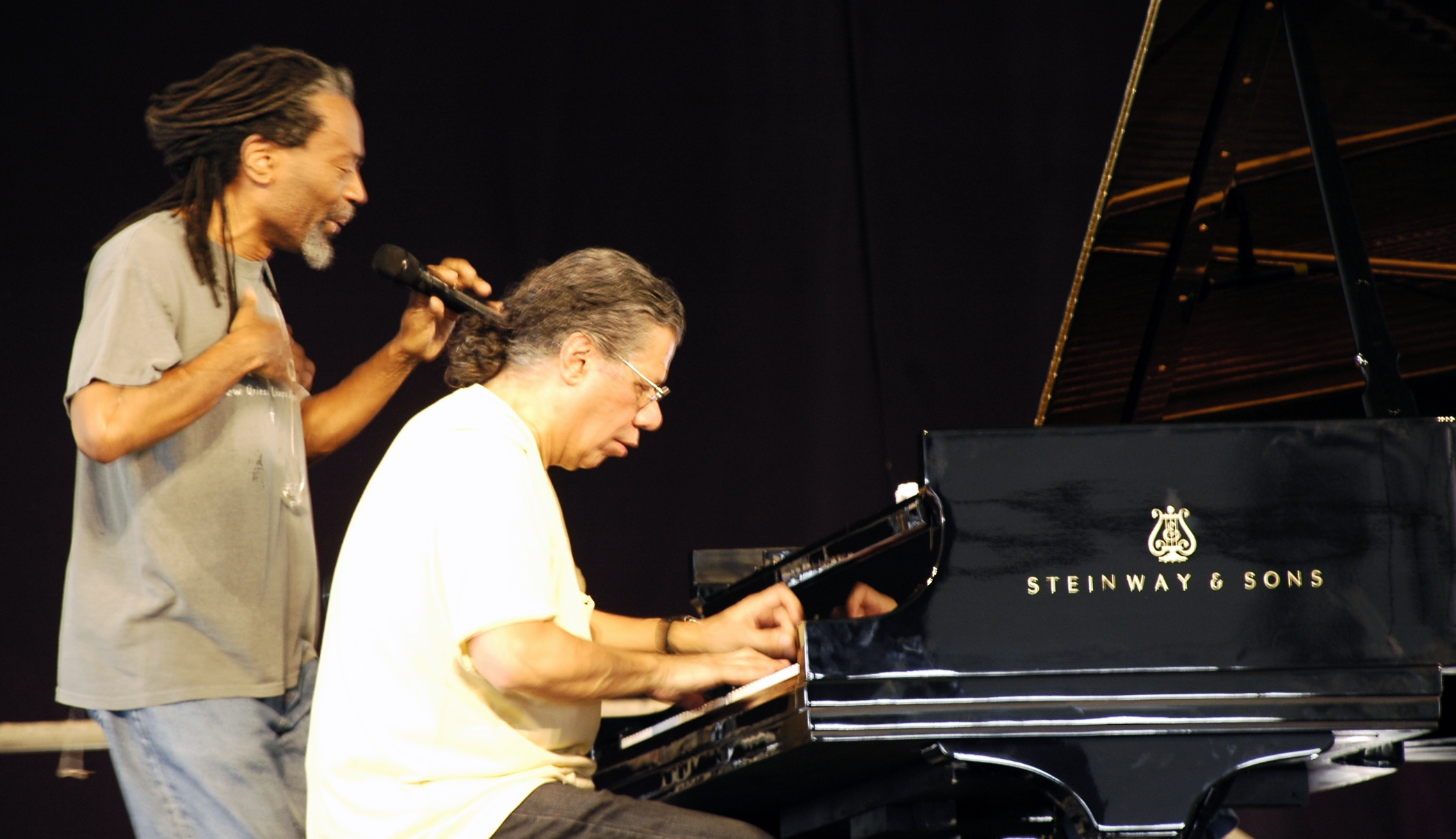
McFerrin performing with Chick Corea at the 2008 edition of the New Orleans Jazz Festival.

McFerrin also participates in various music education programs and makes volunteer appearances as a guest music teacher and lecturer at public schools throughout the U.S. He has collaborated with his son, Taylor, on various musical ventures.

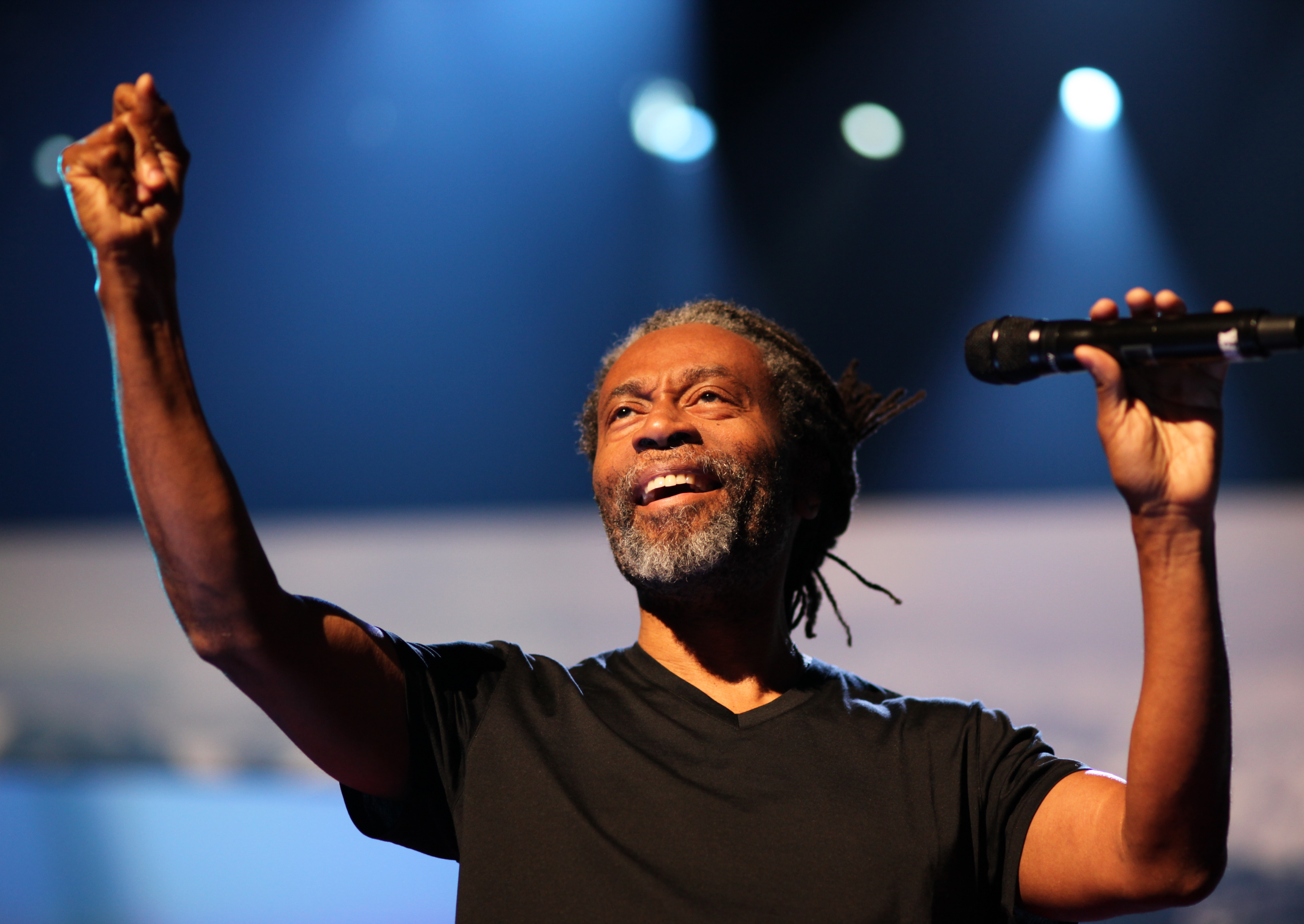
McFerrin participating at a TED conference in March 2011

In July 2003, McFerrin was awarded an Honorary Doctorate of Music from Berklee College of Music during the Umbria Jazz Festival where he conducted two days of clinics.

In 2009, McFerrin and psychologist Daniel Levitin hosted The Music Instinct, a two-hour documentary produced by PBS and based on Levitin's best-selling book This Is Your Brain on Music. Later that year, the two appeared together on a panel at the World Science Festival.

McFerrin was given a lifetime achievement award at the A Cappella Music Awards on May 19, 2018. He received the National Endowment for the Arts Jazz Masters award on August 20, 2020.

McFerrin was honored with the Grammy Awards Lifetime Achievement Award in 2022. This award is given to "performers who, during their lifetimes, have made creative contributions of outstanding artistic significance to the field of recording."

== Personal life ==
McFerrin is married to Debbie Green and has three children; musicians Taylor and Madison, and actor Jevon.

In a 2023 interview with Daniel Levitin, McFerrin revealed that he had been diagnosed with Parkinson's disease, prompting McFerrin to sell his home in the Roxborough neighborhood of Philadelphia and move to San Francisco.

== Vocal technique ==
As a vocalist, McFerrin often switches rapidly between modal and falsetto registers to create polyphonic effects, performing both the main melody and the accompanying parts of songs. He makes use of percussive effects created both with his mouth and by tapping on his chest. McFerrin is also capable of multiphonic singing.

A document of McFerrin's approach to singing is his 1984 album The Voice, the first solo vocal jazz album recorded with no accompaniment or overdubbing.

== Discography ==
=== As leader ===
==== Studio albums ====
Year	Album	Peak chart positions						Record label
Year	Album	US	US R&B	US Jazz	US Cont. Jazz	AUS	UK	Record label
1982	Bobby McFerrin	—	—	41	—	—	—	Elektra/Musician
1984	The Voice	—	—	24	—	—	—	Elektra/Musician
1986	Spontaneous Inventions	103	62	6	2	—	—	Blue Note
1988	Simple Pleasures	5	12	—	1	26	92	EMI
1990	Medicine Music	146	—	—	2	—	—	EMI
1992	Play (with Chick Corea)	—	—	3	—	—	—	Blue Note
1992	Hush (with Yo-Yo Ma)	—	—	—	—	—	—	Sony Masterworks
1995	Bang!Zoom	—	—	—	10	—	—	Blue Note
1995	Paper Music (August)	—	—	—	—	—	—	Sony Classical
1996	The Mozart Sessions (with Chick Corea)	—	—	—	—	—	—	Sony Classical
1997	Circlesongs	—	—	—	—	—	—	Sony Classical
2002	Beyond Words	—	—	—	5	—	—	Blue Note
2010	Vocabularies	—	—	2	—	—	—	EmArcy
2013	Spirityouall	—	—	—	—	—	—	Sony Masterworks
"—" denotes releases that did not chart or were not released in that territory.

==== Singles ====
Year	Song	Peak chart positions						Certifications
Year	Song	US Hot 100	US Adult	US R&B	AUS	CAN	UK	Certifications
1982	"Moondance / Jubilee"	―	―	―	―	―	―	
1982	"You've Really Got a Hold on Me" (with Phoebe Snow)	―	―	―	―	―	―	
1988	"Don't Worry, Be Happy"	1	7	11	1	1	2	RIAA: Gold; ARIA: Platinum; BPI: Gold
1988	"Thinkin' About Your Body"	―	―	―	―	―	46	
1988	"Good Lovin'"	―	―	―	―	―	―	
1990	"The Garden"	―	―	―	―	―	―	
"—" denotes releases that did not chart or were not released in that territory.

=== As sideman ===
- Laurie Anderson, Strange Angels, 1989
- Chick Corea, Rendezvous in New York, 2003
- Jack DeJohnette, Extra Special Edition (Blue Note, 1994)
- En Vogue, Masterpiece Theatre, 2000
- Béla Fleck and the Flecktones, Little Worlds, 2003
- Chico Freeman, Tangents, 1984
- Gal Costa, The Laziest Gal in Town, 1991
- Dizzy Gillespie, Bird Songs: The Final Recordings (Telarc, 1992)
- Dizzy Gillespie, To Bird with Love (Telarc, 1992)
- Herbie Hancock, Round Midnight, 1986
- Michael Hedges, Watching My Life Go By, 1985
- Al Jarreau, Heart's Horizon, 1988
- Quincy Jones, Back on the Block, 1989
- Charles Lloyd Quartet, A Night in Copenhagen (Blue Note, 1984)
- The Manhattan Transfer, Vocalese, 1985
- Wynton Marsalis, The Magic Hour, 2004
- George Martin, In My Life, 1998
- W.A. Mathieu, Available Light, 1987
- Modern Jazz Quartet, MJQ & Friends: A 40th Anniversary Celebration (Atlantic, 1994)
- Pharoah Sanders, Journey to the One (Theresa, 1980)
- Grover Washington Jr., The Best Is Yet to Come, 1982
- Weather Report, Sportin' Life, 1985
- Yellowjackets, Dreamland, 1995
- Joe Zawinul, Di•a•lects, 1986

== Grammy Awards ==
- 1985, Best Jazz Vocal Performance, Male for "Another Night in Tunisia" with Jon Hendricks from the album Vocalese.
- 1985, Best Vocal Arrangement for Two or More Voices, "Another Night in Tunisia" with Cheryl Bentyne.
- 1986, Best Jazz Vocal Performance, Male, "Round Midnight" from the soundtrack album Round Midnight.
- 1987, Best Jazz Vocal Performance, Male, "What Is This Thing Called Love" from the album The Other Side of Round Midnight with Herbie Hancock.
- 1987, Best Recording for Children, "The Elephant's Child" with Jack Nicholson.
- 1988, Song of the Year, "Don't Worry, Be Happy" from the album Simple Pleasures.
- 1988, Record of the Year, "Don't Worry, Be Happy" from the album Simple Pleasures.
- 1988, Best Pop Vocal Performance, Male, "Don't Worry, Be Happy" from the album Simple Pleasures.
- 1988, Best Jazz Vocal Performance, "Brothers" from the album Duets by Rob Wasserman.
- 1992, Best Jazz Vocal Performance, "Round Midnight" from the album Play.
- 2023, Grammy Lifetime Achievement Award

== See also ==
- List of American Grammy Award winners and nominees
