= List of The Tonight Show Starring Jimmy Fallon episodes (2020) =

- No. of episodes: 198

Release
- Original network: NBC
- Original release: January 6 – December 18, 2020

Season chronology
- ← Previous; 2019 episodes Next → 2021 episodes

This is the list of episodes for The Tonight Show Starring Jimmy Fallon in 2020. All episodes from March 23–June 26 were filmed at Fallon's home due to the COVID-19 pandemic.

== 2020 ==
=== January ===
No.	Original release date	Guest(s)	Musical/entertainment guest(s)
1181	January 6, 2020	Shaquille O'Neal, Jacqueline Novak	Lil Baby
News Smash; Jimmy acknowledges the 2019–20 Australian bushfire season; Tonight Show Go On, Git!; Tonight Show Random Instrument Challenge (Shaquille O'Neal); Shaquille O'Neal and Jimmy have Krispy Kreme doughnuts; Jaqueline Novak, Jimmy and the audience twirl; Jacqueline Novak reads an email from her father to her uncle regarding Get On Your Knees; Lil Baby performed "Woah"
1182	January 7, 2020	Salma Hayek, George MacKay, Ask This Old House experts	N/A
Notice that the night's episode taping was conducted before the breaking news of the 2020 Iranian attack on U.S. forces in Iraq; the crew uses Instagram filters; Tonight Show News & Improved; What's Behind Me? (Salma Hayek Pinault)
1183	January 8, 2020	Quentin Tarantino, Jodie Whittaker	Nathaniel Rateliff
Jeopardy! Worst of All Time; Tonight Show Screengrabs; Freestylin' with The Roots; Nathaniel Rateliff performed "And It's Still Alright"
1184	January 9, 2020	Will Smith, Patti Smith	Patti Smith
Tonight Show #hashtags: #RuinAMovieWithOneWord; The History of Will Smith (with Will Smith); Patti Smith performed "After the Gold Rush"
1185	January 10, 2020	Martin Lawrence, Matthew Lopez & Kyle Soller	Karol G
Timothée Chalamet Quotes; Thank You Notes; Tonight Show Do Not Play; Martin Lawrence shows Jimmy boxing moves; Karol G performed "Tusa"
1186	January 13, 2020	Selena Gomez, Charlie Hunnam	Stormzy
The Guy Who Wouldn't Stop Wooing; Tonight Show Talk Like Trump; Tonight Show Can You Feel It? (Selena Gomez); Stormzy performed "Crown"
1187	January 14, 2020	Tyler Perry, Yara Shahidi	Black Pumas
Vince Vaughn/Donald Trump Conversation Audio; Tonight Show Polls; Catchphrase (Jimmy Fallon & Tariq Vs. Tyler Perry & Yara Shahidi); Black Pumas performed "Colors"
1188	January 15, 2020	Robert Downey Jr., Aidy Bryant	Little Big Town
News Smash; Democratic Debate Conversation Audio; Trending Twitter Topics; Tonight Show This Week in Memes; Zynerma Commercial (Robert Downey Jr.); Little Big Town performed "Sugar Coat"
1189	January 16, 2020	The cast of Schitt's Creek, Finn Wolfhard	Justin Willman
Tonight Show #hashtags: #DumbestFamilyFight; Know Your Schitt's Creek (The Cast of Schitt's Creek); Tonight Show One Second Songs (Finn Wolfhard)
1190	January 17, 2020	Matthew McConaughey & Hugh Grant, Vanessa Hudgens	Ashley McBryde
Tonight Show This Week in Words; Tonight Show Drop It In (cast of Dolittle); Thank You Notes; Matthew McConaughey & Hugh Grant read lines from each others' films; Tonight Show True Confessions (Matthew McConaughey & Hugh Grant); Ashley McBryde performed "One Night Standards"
1191	January 20, 2020	Ken Jeong, Kate Upton	Old Dominion
Tonight Show #Blessed #Inspired; Tonight Show Heavy or Light (Ken Jeong, Kate Upton); Ken Jeong dances; Ken Jeong performed "Santeria"; Kate Upton teaches Jimmy jujitsu; Old Dominion performed "One Man Band"
1192	January 21, 2020	Martin Short, David Dobrik	Yola
C-SPAN After Dark Commercial; Courtroom Sketches; Tonight Show Do Not Read; Charades (Martin Short & Jimmy Fallon Vs. David Dobrik); David Dobrik throws to commercial; Yola performed "I Don't Wanna Lie"
1193	January 22, 2020	Halsey, Leslie Jones, Claire Saffitz	N/A
Ted Cruz: Please Stop Saying That; Princess Cruises Cruise Names; One Second Below Deck Quiz (Leslie Jones); Tonight Show Picture This; Halsey and Jimmy draw portraits of each other; Jimmy gives Halsey shoes; Tonight Show Google Translate Songs (Halsey)
1194	January 23, 2020	Noah Centineo, Wendy Williams	Griselda
Impeachment Trial Notes; Netflix Viewer Numbers; New App Testing; Tonight Show #hashtags: #ThereShouldBeALaw; Water War (Noah Centineo); Griselda performed "Dr. Bird's"
1195	January 24, 2020	Milo Ventimiglia, Guy Raz	Carmen Lynch
News Smash; Tonight Show This Week in Words; David Dobrik and Jimmy make a YouTube video; Thank You Notes; Jimmy pitches Guy Raz on new apps
1196	January 27, 2020	Michael Strahan, Matt Bomer	Nick Thune
Jimmy acknowledges the death of Kobe Bryant at the top of the program; Book Blurbs
1197	January 28, 2020	Michael Bloomberg, Deepak Chopra	Rapsody featuring PJ Morton
Republican Excuse Generator; Jimmy as Donald Trump cold calls to rich, Undecided voters (Michael Bloomberg); Jimmy uses Deepak Chopra AI; Rapsody featuring PJ Morton performed "Afeni"
1198	January 29, 2020	Blake Lively, Jameela Jamil	Roddy Ricch
Tonight Show Talk Like Trump; Tonight Show #hashtags: #AddAWordRuinABook; Box of Lies (Blake Lively); Jameela Jamil sneaks food into the studio; Roddy Ricch performed "The Box"
1199	January 30, 2020	J. J. Watt, Louis Tomlinson	Louis Tomlinson
Impeachment Trial Sketch Captions; Jimmy covers "Dinosaurs in Love"; Jimmy calls Vin Diesel and Diesel invites select audience member to concert; Hot Ones (appearance by Sean Evans, Jimmy Fallon & J. J. Watt); J. J. Watt does a touchdown dance; Louis Tomlinson performed "Walls"
1200	January 31, 2020	Ewan McGregor, Fran Lebowitz	Mustard & Roddy Ricch
Trending Tweets; Thank You Notes; Puppy Predictors: 2020 Super Bowl Edition; Point Pleasant Police Department (Ewan McGregor); Mustard & Roddy Ricch performed "Ballin'"

=== February ===
No.	Original release date	Guest(s)	Musical/entertainment guest(s)
1201	February 3, 2020	Andy Samberg, Mary Elizabeth Winstead	Finneas
News Smash; Tonight Show Popular Mathematics; "High Kickin'" (Andy Samberg); Jorma Taccone sits in the audience; Jimmy replays a comedy sketch with Brad Pitt; Finneas performed "Let's Fall in Love for the Night"
1202	February 4, 2020	Margot Robbie, Jeff Probst	Mura Masa & slowthai
Iowa State Precinct Representative; Tonight Show Know It All (Margot Robbie); Margot Robbie and Jimmy have pudding; Jeff Probst reads an email from Jimmy; Mura Masa & slowthai performed "Deal wiv It"
1203	February 5, 2020	Claire Danes, Lana Condor	Lil Wayne
Jimmy appears as Donald Trump rehearsing the 2020 State of the Union Address; Tonight Show Virtual Reality Pictionary (Claire Danes & Lil Wayne Vs. Jimmy Fallon & Lana Condor); Tonight Show Emotional Interview (Claire Danes); Lil Wayne performed "Dreams"
1204	February 6, 2020	RuPaul, Meghan Trainor	Meghan Trainor
Tonight Show #hashtags: #DescribeAMovieBadly; Tonight Show Musical Genre Challenge (Meghan Trainor); Dirty Charades (RuPaul); Meghan Trainor performed "Nice to Meet Ya"
1205	February 7, 2020	Jennifer Lopez, Lil Rel Howery	Andre D Thompson
Vladimir Putin Film Reviews; Tonight Show This Week in Words; Thank You Notes
1206	February 10, 2020	Janet Jackson, Jane Levy	Jo Firestone
Politician Parody Films; Owl Memes; Tonight Show News & Improved; Tonight Show Why Wasn't This Made?
1207	February 11, 2020	Constance Wu, Backstreet Boys	Skip Marley & H.E.R.
Politician Valentine's Day Poems; Tonight Show Go On, Git!; The Ragtime Gals performed "Thong Song" by Sisqó (with Backstreet Boys); Backstreet Boys performed "If I Ever Fall in Love"; Skip Marley & H.E.R. performed "Slow Down"
1208	February 12, 2020	Ryan Seacrest, Zoë Kravitz	Jack Harlow
Tom Steyer: Poor Choice of Words; Chipotle Mexican Grill Commercial; Jimmy Fallon, Janet Jackson & The Roots sing "Runaway" with classroom instruments; Tonight Show Audience Suggestion Box (The Three Torettos performed "Cars", 2020 Worst in Show, Zoë Kravitz and Jimmy performed "Up Where We Belong"); Ryan Seacrest's parents sit in the audience; Jack Harlow performed "Whats Poppin"
1209	February 13, 2020	Rosario Dawson, Logan Lerman	Megan Thee Stallion
News Smash; Justin Bieber and Jimmy play hockey; Tonight Show #hashtags: #WeddingFail; Cory Booker briefly appears during Rosario Dawson's interview; Tonight Show Whisper Challenge (Rosario Dawson); Jimmy gives Logan Lerman gifts; Megan Thee Stallion performed "B.I.T.C.H."
1210	February 14, 2020	Steve Buscemi, Zoey Deutch	Justin Bieber featuring Quavo
In Lighter News; Steve Buscemi makes an appearance during the monologue; Tonight Show Polls; Thank You Notes; Steve Buscemi wishes a Happy Valentine's Day to his mother; Steve Buscemi and Jimmy give audience member a candle; Zoey Deutch gives Jimmy a rose; Justin Bieber featuring Quavo performed "Intentions"
1211	February 24, 2020	BTS	BTS
Episode filmed in the New York City Subway; Thank You Notes; Freestylin' with The Roots: Subway Edition (appearance by Rev Run); Tonight Show Subway Stories (Tina Fey, Lin-Manuel Miranda, Fran Lebowitz); BTS and Jimmy eat at Katz's Delicatessen; BTS performed "On" in Grand Central Terminal
1212	February 25, 2020	Nick Jonas, Steve Coogan	Girl from the North Country
Donald Trump Yoga Poses; Donald Trump Video; Tonight Show This Week in Memes; Slay It, Don't Spray It (Nick Jonas); Girl from the North Country performed "Slow Train/License to Kill"
1213	February 26, 2020	David Beckham, Guy Fieri	Doja Cat
The Walt Disney Company CEO Announcement; Tonight Show Picture This; Tonight Show Battle of the Instant Songwriters; Jimmy gives David Beckham a Lego Star Wars set; Jimmy challenges Guy Fieri to drink a raw egg; Doja Cat performed "Say So"
1214	February 27, 2020	John Mulaney, Bad Bunny	Bad Bunny & Sech
Trump's Tips to Avoid Coronavirus; Tonight Show #hashtags: #AddAWordRuinATVShow; Hey Robot... (John Mulaney); Bad Bunny reveals details of his upcoming album; Bad Bunny & Sech performed "Ignorantes"
1215	February 28, 2020	Norman Reedus, Hailey Bieber	A Boogie wit da Hoodie
News Smash; Donald Trump Definitions; Thank You Notes; Phone Booth (Norman Reedus, Hailey Bieber); A Boogie wit da Hoodie performed "Me and My Guitar"

=== March ===
No.	Original release date	Guest(s)	Musical/entertainment guest(s)
1216	March 2, 2020	Rachel Maddow, Pamela Adlon	Joji
Handwashing Hits Album Commercial; Tonight Show #Blessed #Inspired; Tonight Show Do Not Play; Joji performed "Run"
1217	March 3, 2020	Kevin Bacon, Tan France	Taylor Tomlinson
Voting Stickers; Super Tuesday; Jimmy performed "Goodbye, Super Tuesday"; Tonight Show Talk Like Trump; Password (Jimmy Fallon & Tan France Vs. Kevin Bacon & Tariq); Kevin Bacon tries to hit a bullseye with an axe
1218	March 4, 2020	Hillary Rodham Clinton, Noah Schnapp	Jane Birkin & Iggy Pop
Super Tuesday News Media Coverage; Tariq and Jimmy give each other footshakes; Jimmy plays Joe Biden and Bernie Sanders; Tonight Show Bag of Secrets (Hillary Rodham Clinton); Jane Birkin & Iggy Pop performed "Elisa"
1219	March 5, 2020	Seth Meyers, Whitney Cummings	Puss n Boots
Dream Island Ad; Tonight Show #hashtags: #SpringBreakInSixWords; Whitney Cummings and Jimmy switch places; Puss n Boots performed "Angel Dream"
1220	March 6, 2020	Carrie Underwood, Diego Luna	Lauv
Jimmy plays Mike Pence in coronavirus PSA; Purell Ad; Something You Didn't Expect to Hear Today; Tonight Show Use It & Lose It; Thank You Notes; Tonight Show Fittest of the Fit Challenge (Carrie Underwood); Carrie Underwood teaches Jimmy workout moves; Lauv performed "Modern Loneliness"
1221	March 9, 2020	Alex Rodriguez, KJ Apa	HAIM
Joe Biden Company Endorsements; Mick Mulvaney Considered Jobs; In Lighter News; HAIM and Jimmy performed "I Liked an Instagram Post from 2012"; Tonight Show News & Improved; Tonight Show Q&A–Rod (Alex Rodriguez); HAIM performed "The Steps"
1222	March 10, 2020	Nick Offerman, Charli D'Amelio	HAIM
New York Scents; Tonight Show Polls; Teaching Dad 8 TikTok Dances (Charli D'Amelio); Word Sneak (Nick Offerman); Charli D'Amelio and Jimmy dance; HAIM performed "Summer Girl"
1223	March 11, 2020	Senator Bernie Sanders, Angela Bassett	Isabel Hagen
CDC Songs; Purell Fragrance Ad; Beastie Boys Story Parody; Fact Vs. Fiction
1224	March 12, 2020	Dr. Oz, Mandy Moore, Dane DeHaan	Mandy Moore
Episode filmed without a studio audience due to the COVID-19 pandemic; Jimmy makes a statement on the lack of a studio audience and the state of the COVID-19 pandemic, while also thanking his staff; Jimmy shreds monologue jokes; Tonight Show Drop It In; Tonight Show #hashtags: #KidQuotes; Dane DeHaan throws Jimmy a fake punch; Mandy Moore performed "When I Wasn't Watching"
1225E	March 23, 2020	Trevor Noah, D-Nice	N/A
Tonight Show Go On, Git!; "Best of" interview with Bradley Cooper; "Best of" Lip Sync Battle with Emma Stone
1226E	March 24, 2020	John Legend	John Legend
Ask the Fallons; Jimmy performed the original song "Prom with Your Mom"; "Best of" interview with Nicole Kidman (originally aired January 6, 2015); John Legend performed "Actions"
1227E	March 25, 2020	Niall Horan	Niall Horan
What Are You Doing Wednesdays; "Best of" History of Disney Songs with Kristen Bell (originally aired November 12, 2019); Niall Horan performed "Dear Patience"; "Best of" interview with Joaquin Phoenix (originally aired October 4, 2019); "Best of" Tones and I performed "Dance Monkey" (originally aired November 18, 2019)
1228E	March 26, 2020	Alec Baldwin	Luke Hemmings
Tonight Show #hashtags: #IKnewIHadCabinFeverWhen; "Best of" Tight Pants with Jennifer Lopez (originally aired June 9, 2014); Two Really Fun Men perform a quarantine song together from their homes; Luke Hemmings performed "Old Me"; "Best of" interview with Jennifer Lawrence (originally aired May 15, 2014); "Best of" Pharrell Williams performed "Freedom" atop the NBC Studios marquee (originally aired September 11, 2015)
1229E	March 27, 2020	Tina Fey, José Andrés	N/A
Jimmy announces the birth of Kamal Gray's son, Krú Ameen Gray; Jimmy and The Roots performed "Stuck in the Middle with You"; Thank You Notes; Hey Robot (Tina Fey)
1230E	March 30, 2020	Kim Kardashian West, Jon Bon Jovi	OneRepublic
Jimmy checks in on Steve Higgins; "Weird Al" Yankovic performed "One More Minute" from home quarantine; OneRepublic performed "Didn't I"
1231E	March 31, 2020	Demi Lovato, Jonathan Van Ness	Demi Lovato
Jimmy and his wife have conversations; Demi Lovato and Jimmy paint portraits of each other; Demi Lovato performed "I Love Me"

=== April ===
No.	Original release date	Guest(s)	Musical/entertainment guest(s)
1232E	April 1, 2020	Vice President Joe Biden, Andy Puddicombe	Marcus Mumford
Jimmy FaceTimes with Lady Gaga; What Are You Doing Wednesdays; Andy Puddicombe and Jimmy have a meditation session; Marcus Mumford performed "Lay Your Head on Me"
1233E	April 2, 2020	Adam Sandler, Jessica Alba	Hot Country Knights
Tonight Show #hashtags: #QuarantineAMovie; Jimmy Talks with Gary; Adam Sandler performed "The Quarantine Song"; Jessica Alba and Jimmy do a makeup tutorial
1234E	April 3, 2020	Miley Cyrus, Rachel Brosnahan	Lewis Capaldi
Thank You Notes; Miley Cyrus answers fan questions; Rachel Brosnahan teaches Jimmy a yoga move; Lewis Capaldi performed "Before You Go"
1235E	April 6, 2020	Lady Gaga, Andy Cohen	Billie Joe Armstrong
Adam Sandler and Jimmy performed "Don't Touch Grandma"; Jimmy announces One World: Together at Home, a joint coronavirus benefit co-hosted with Stephen Colbert and Jimmy Kimmel, airing April 18 on NBC, CBS and ABC; Lady Gaga FaceTimes Tim Cook during the interview; Billie Joe Armstrong performed "I Think We're Alone Now"
1236E	April 7, 2020	Justin Timberlake, Russell Wilson & Ciara	The Avett Brothers
Jimmy acknowledges the death of Hal Willner from COVID-19 at the top of the program; Justin Timberlake and Jimmy do a musical number through different devices; #AskTheFallons; Jimmy's daughter loses a tooth during the Russell Wilson & Ciara interview; The Avett Brothers performed "C Sections and Railway Trestles"
1237E	April 8, 2020	Taraji P. Henson, Dua Lipa	Dua Lipa
Jimmy sings to himself in the mirror; What Are You Doing Wednesdays; The Longest Days of Our Lives (Kristen Wiig, Will Ferrell); Dua Lipa performed "Break My Heart"
1238E	April 9, 2020	Mike D & Ad-Rock, Anna Kendrick	N/A
Jimmy acknowledges the deaths in New York City due to COVID-19, assuring that they will be remembered as well as thanking everyone who is working on the sidelines; Tonight Show #hashtags: #MyQuarantineSuperPower; Jimmy Fallon, Sting & The Roots sing "Don't Stand So Close to Me" with classroom instruments; Questlove participates in Mike D & Ad-Rock's interview; Anna Kendrick shows her LEGO projects; Jimmy acknowledges the death of John Prine due to COVID-19
1239E	April 10, 2020	Kerry Washington, Andrew Rannells	Anderson .Paak & The Free Nationals
Jimmy thanks everyone for staying at home; Thank You Notes; Jimmy checks in with Tariq; Anderson .Paak & The Free Nationals performed "Come Home"
1240E	April 13, 2020	Blake Shelton, Kenan Thompson	Blake Shelton & Gwen Stefani
Jimmy checks in on Steve Higgins; Quiplash (Kenan Thompson, Whitney Cummings, Melissa Villaseñor); Gwen Stefani gives Blake Shelton a haircut; Blake Shelton & Gwen Stefani performed "Nobody but You"
1241E	April 14, 2020	Michael Shannon, J. J. Watt	Rita Ora
AskTheFallons; Michael Shannon plays his drum machine; Know Your Bro (J. J., Derek & T. J. Watt); Rita Ora performed "How to Be Lonely"
1242E	April 15, 2020	Pharrell Williams, Millie Bobby Brown	N/A
What Are You Doing Wednesdays; Tonight Show Do Not Play: At Home Edition; Tonight Show Singing Whisper Challenge (Millie Bobby Brown)
1243E	April 16, 2020	Chelsea Handler, Kelly Clarkson, Dude Perfect	Michael McDonald
Tonight Show #hashtags: #QuarantineATVShow; Kelly Clarkson performed "I Never Loved a Man (The Way I Love You)"; Michael McDonald performed "On My Own"
1244E	April 17, 2020	Hugh Jackman, Rose Byrne, Will Ferrell & Kristen Wiig	Kesha
T-Mobile announces a donation of $2.5 million to local schools and Boys & Girls Clubs of America for COVID-19 relief; Thank You Notes; The Longest Days of Our Lives (Kristen Wiig, Will Ferrell, Matthew McConaughey); Hugh Jackman and Jimmy make bread; Rose Byrne makes a cocktail; Bobby Cannavale participates in Rose Byrne's interview; Kesha performed "Resentment"
1245E	April 20, 2020	Melissa McCarthy & Octavia Spencer, Megan Thee Stallion	Dan White
Tonight Show Screengrabs; BFF Showdown (Octavia Spencer & Melissa McCarthy)
1246E	April 21, 2020	Halle Berry, Russell Westbrook	Meghan Trainor
Ask the Fallons; Meghan Trainor performed "Cry Cry Cry"
1247E	April 22, 2020	LL Cool J, Dr. Jane Goodall	Kae Tempest
Jimmy celebrates Earth Day during the monologue; What Are You Doing Wednesdays; One–Second Song Challenge (Questlove); Jimmy plays LL Cool J's Furious Five Challenge; Homeschooling with Nick Thune; Kae Tempest performed "People's Faces"
1248E	April 23, 2020	Alex Rodriguez, Rhett & Link	Tones and I
Las Vegas Reopening Slogans; Tonight Show #hashtags: #QuarantineQuotes; Hot Ones (appearance by Sean Evans, Jimmy Fallon & Alex Rodriguez); Tones and I performed "Bad Child"
1249E	April 24, 2020	Jonas Brothers, Lester Holt, Charli D'Amelio	CHVRCHES
Virtual Kentucky Derby Horses; Thank You Notes; Quarantine Confessions (Jonas Brothers); Kevin Jonas' daughters crash the interview; Nick Jonas shows how to work out to "Baby Shark"; Lester Holt's dog shows up during the interview; Pet Duets with Charli D'Amelio; CHVRCHES performed "Forever"
1250E	April 27, 2020	Kate Hudson, Alessia Cara	Alessia Cara
Jimmy performed "Starting to Crack" at the top of the program; Tonight Show Go On, Git!; Tonight Show One Word Songs (Alessia Cara); Alessia Cara does ventriloquism; Alessia Cara plays voice memo of her writing "The Bridge"; Alessia Cara performed "October"
1251E	April 28, 2020	Ricky Gervais, Billy Porter	The Lumineers
New Girl Scout Cookies Flavors; Ask the Fallons; Hey Robot... (Ricky Gervais); The Lumineers performed "Salt and the Sea"
1252E	April 29, 2020	Shailene Woodley, Maluma	Thom Yorke
What Are You Doing Wednesdays; Shailene Woodley and Jimmy do a handstand; Thom Yorke performed "Plasticine Figures"
1253E	April 30, 2020	Vince Vaughn, Gigi Hadid	Maluma
Purell Commercial; Tonight Show #hashtags: #QuarantineABook; Jimmy's dog Gary FaceTimes; Vince Vaughn and Jimmy's Inner Thoughts; Maluma performed "ADMV"

=== May ===
No.	Original release date	Guest(s)	Musical/entertainment guest(s)
1254E	May 1, 2020	Jon Hamm, Brené Brown	Hailee Steinfeld
Jimmy cannot afford "Footloose" because the NBC legal team is out of the office, and could not clear the music for air; Jeopardy! Categories; Thank You Notes; The Longest Days of Our Lives (Kristen Wiig, Will Ferrell, Jake Gyllenhaal, Susan Lucci, Maurice Benard, Mary Beth Evans and Heather Locklear); Jon Hamm shows his father's fez; Hailee Steinfeld performed "I Love You's"
1255E	May 4, 2020	Ashton Kutcher & Mila Kunis, Evan Rachel Wood	Annie Lennox
Global News (appearance by Mick Jagger); Tariq raps about Star Wars characters; Voice Swap (Ashton Kutcher & Mila Kunis); Evan Rachel Wood is learning how to play the piano; Evan Rachel Would or Evan Rachel Wouldn't (Evan Rachel Wood); Annie Lennox performed "A Thousand Beautiful Things"
1256E	May 5, 2020	Ryan Reynolds, Karlie Kloss	Ezra Koenig
Jimmy performed "Teachers' Day Song" at the top of the program; Time Travel Tuesday; Jimmy plays Nicolas Cage as Joe Exotic; Ask the Fallons; Ezra Koenig performed a medley of songs
1257E	May 6, 2020	Governor Andrew Cuomo, Gabrielle Union	Brad Paisley
Tonight Show Face Mask the Nation; What Are You Doing Wednesday?; Tonight Show Search Party (The Roots & Gabrielle Union); Brad Paisley performed "No I In Beer"
1258E	May 7, 2020	Queen Latifah, Pete Davidson & Judd Apatow	James Taylor
Bootsy Collins briefly introduces the monologue with Jimmy; Tonight Show #hashtags: #QuarantineMomQuotes; Jimmy talks to mothers on the frontlines and sends a gift package along with a Samsung gift of $25,000; Tonight Show What Am I Saying? (Queen Latifah); James Taylor performed "You Can Close Your Eyes"
1259E	May 8, 2020	Mark Ruffalo, Bill Murray & Guy Fieri	Miranda Lambert
Mountain Dew Commercial; Barbra Streisand calls Jimmy during the monologue; Bootsy Collins briefly introduces Thank You Notes with Jimmy; Thank You Notes; Jimmy, Bill Murray & Guy Fieri make nachos; Miranda Lambert performed "Bluebird"
1260E	May 11, 2020	Seth MacFarlane, David Chang	Lady Antebellum
Quarantine Pickup Lines; Tonight Show #Blessed #Inspired; Tonight Show Tariq's Irk List; One Song Many Artists (Seth MacFarlane); Lady Antebellum performed "Champagne Night"
1261E	May 12, 2020	Ethan Hawke, Elle Fanning	Maroon 5
Jimmy Fallon, Brendon Urie & The Roots sing "Under Pressure" with classroom instruments; Ask the Fallons; Maroon 5 performed "Memories"
1262E	May 13, 2020	David Spade, Kathryn Hahn	The Killers
What Are You Doing Wednesday?; Tonight Show Do Not Play; Tonight Show Wheel of Opinions (David Spade); The Killers performed "Caution"
1263E	May 14, 2020	Chris Evans, Mo Willems	Kane Brown
Tonight Show #hashtags: #FirstThingImGoingToDoWhenThisIsOver; Jarret (appearance by Horatio Sanz); #BrotherChallenge (Chris & Scott Evans); Doodle Challenge (Mo Willems); Kane Brown performed "Cool Again"
1264E	May 15, 2020	Dwayne Johnson, Daveed Diggs	The Head and the Heart
Pants Commercial; Thank You Notes; Jimmy promotes Red Nose Day; Show Us Your Books Video; The Head and the Heart performed "Honeybee"
1265E	May 18, 2020	Arnold Schwarzenegger, Cole Sprouse	Billy Corgan
Jimmy's wife's birthday; Johnny Bananas wishes Jimmy's wife a happy birthday; Tourism Slogans; Tim Williamson Comedy Special Trailer; Billy Corgan performed "Hard Times"
1266E	May 19, 2020	Ben Stiller, Hannah Gadsby	Tim McGraw
Jimmy checks in with Steve Higgins; Jimmy as James Taylor performed "Carolina and Anywhere Else in My Mind"; Tim McGraw performed "I Called Mama"
1267E	May 20, 2020	Anthony Anderson, Michelle Dockery	Gary Clark Jr.
Grimace's Bistro Commercial; What Are You Doing Wednesday?; Tonight Show Audience Suggestion Box (Jimmy takes the audience for a ride on his slide, Jimmy shares some of his vinyl records, Jimmy watches the first ten seconds of Ozark, Jimmy shows the inside of his refrigerator, writers' room meeting, Jimmy says Ingrid Michaelson's name underwater); Gary Clark Jr. performed "Low Down Rolling Stone"
1268E	May 21, 2020	Sofía Vergara, Steve Coogan & Rob Brydon	Courtney Barnett
Jimmy announces that Pizza Hut is giving out 500,000 free pizzas to 2020 graduates; Jimmy, Billy Idol & The Roots performed "Dancing with Myself" with classroom instruments; Tonight Show Random Instrument Challenge (The Roots); Courtney Barnett performed "Sunday Roast"
1269E	May 22, 2020	Jennifer Lopez, Henry Winkler	Twenty One Pilots
Quarantine Aprons; The Thinking Tree; Watch–It–Once TikTok Challenge (Jennifer Lopez); Henry Winkler shows his life in jackets; Twenty One Pilots performed "Level of Concern"
52520	May 25, 2020	Ariana Grande, Paul McCartney, Blake Shelton	N/A
Staff Favorites Special: "Best of" clips from Late Night and The Tonight Show
52620	May 26, 2020	Jennifer Lopez, Michelle Obama, Brad Pitt	N/A
Staff Favorites Special: "Best of" clips from Late Night and The Tonight Show
52720	May 27, 2020	Bruce Springsteen, Jamie Foxx, Will Ferrell	N/A
Staff Favorites Special: "Best of" clips from Late Night and The Tonight Show
52820	May 28, 2020	Kevin Hart, Justin Timberlake, Amy Poehler	N/A
Staff Favorites Special: "Best of" clips from Late Night and The Tonight Show
52920	May 29, 2020	Miley Cyrus, Barack Obama, Steve Carell	N/A
Staff Favorites Special: "Best of" clips from Late Night and The Tonight Show

=== June ===
No.	Original release date	Guest(s)	Musical/entertainment guest(s)
1270E	June 1, 2020	Derrick Johnson, Don Lemon, Jane Elliott	The Roots & Bilal
Jimmy acknowledges the recent controversy over an SNL sketch that he appeared in and dedicates the night's broadcast speaking to experts on racism and anti–racism; Questlove & Tariq present an encore airing of The Roots & Bilal's performance of "It Ain't Fair" (originally aired August 7, 2017)
1271E	June 2, 2020	Kareem Abdul-Jabbar, Phoebe Robinson, W. Kamau Bell	N/A
Jimmy acknowledges Blackout Tuesday; notice that no musical performance will be held because of Blackout Tuesday
1272E	June 3, 2020	Senator Kamala Harris, Talib Kweli, Roy Wood Jr.	N/A
Rebroadcast of The Roots & Yim Yames' performance of "Dear God 2.0" (originally aired June 18, 2010)
1273E	June 4, 2020	Senator Bernie Sanders, Dr. Bernice A. King, Wyatt Cenac	Gary Clark Jr. featuring The Roots
Donald Trump Gettysburg Address; Hmm... You Could Do Better Commercial; rebroadcast of Gary Clark Jr. featuring The Roots' performance of "This Land" (originally aired December 11, 2019)
1274E	June 8, 2020	John Oliver, Spike Lee	BENEE featuring Gus Dapperton
Clyde Bailey; John Oliver shows a Golden Girls Chia Pet; BENEE featuring Gus Dapperton performed "Supalonely"
1275E	June 9, 2020	The Co-Hosts of Queer Eye, Christian Slater	Sia
Whimpleton, the Forgotten Fourth Harry Potter Character; A Complete List of Things People Want to Hear J. K. Rowling's Take On; Jimmy chats with Martha Bergman, one of Bill de Blasio's chief strategists; Sia performed "Together"
1276E	June 10, 2020	Robert De Niro, James Blake	Lenny Kravitz
US Army Fort Renames; Jimmy checks in with his staff; What Are You Doing Wednesday?; Lenny Kravitz performed "Believe"
1277E	June 11, 2020	Anthony Mackie, David Dobrik	Avril Lavigne
Tonight Show Couldntyajust?!; Twitter Questions; Mayor Speech; Avril Lavigne performed "We Are Warriors"
1278E	June 12, 2020	Kevin Bacon, Aunjanue Ellis, Sarah Cooper	Christine and the Queens
Statement on Necco Wafers; debut of one of Sarah Cooper's TikTok videos; Thank You Notes; Christine and the Queens performed "I Disappear in Your Arms"
1279E	June 15, 2020	Martin Short, Bashir Salahuddin & Diallo Riddle	Randy Newman
Jimmy tells as many Donald Trump jokes as he can during the monologue; Donald Trump Attack Ad; Nelson Fleming; Randy Newman performed "Mr. President"
1280E	June 16, 2020	Gwyneth Paltrow, Zachary Quinto	Alec Benjamin
Tonight Show That's Like Saying; Taylor Mayhew; headspace 2020 App Ad; Gwyneth Paltrow's son crashes the interview; Alec Benjamin performed "Oh My God"
1281E	June 17, 2020	Sean Penn, Dr. Robin DiAngelo	Weezer
Anthony Fauci Voicemails; Ted Cruz Video Statement; Harland Farragut; What Are You Doing Wednesday?; Tonight Show Go On, Git!; Weezer performed "Hero"
1282E	June 18, 2020	Don Cheadle, Reverend Al Sharpton	Luke Bryan
Dancing with the Stars Ad; Tamagotchi Ad; Thank You Notes; Astronomy Club Zoom Call; Luke Bryan performed "Build Me a Daddy"
1283E	June 22, 2020	John Legend, Mike Birbiglia	John Legend
Trump Rally Tweets; New York City Fireworks Statement; Tim Barnes Zoom Call; 15 Zoom Excuses; John Legend performed "Ooh Laa"
1284E	June 23, 2020	Lin-Manuel Miranda, Kenya Barris	Michael Stipe & Big Red Machine
Protest Chants for White People Album Ad; Ask the Fallons; Tonight Show Random Object Freestyle (Lin-Manuel Miranda); Michael Stipe & Aaron Dessner from Big Red Machine performed "No Time for Love Like Now"
1285E	June 24, 2020	Russell Crowe, Ben Platt	Brittany Howard
Backpat Ad; What Are You Doing Wednesday?; Brittany Howard performed "Goat Head"
1286E	June 25, 2020	Shaquille O'Neal, John Lithgow	Ozuna
Hand Sanitizer Ad; Yelp Reviews; debut of Jimmy's first TikTok video; Tonight Show Google Translate Songs (Demi Lovato); John Lithgow shows the cover image of his new book; Ozuna performed "Caramelo/Mamacita"
1287E	June 26, 2020	Pierce Brosnan, Nicole Richie	Blackpink
Mike Pence Tour Ad; Those Friends from Your Instagram Feed; Thank You Notes; The Longest Days of Our Lives (Will Ferrell, Kristen Wiig, Tariq); Tonight Show Try Not to Laugh Challenge (Blackpink); Blackpink performed "How You Like That"

=== July ===
No.	Original release date	Guest(s)	Musical/entertainment guest(s)
1288A	July 13, 2020	Charlize Theron, Governor Andrew Cuomo	Little Big Town
First show back in the studio; Masculine Man Masks Commercial; Tonight Show Couldntyajust?!; Jimmy performed "It's Beginning to Feel a Bit Like Normal"; I Like Your Style; Little Big Town performed "Wine, Beer, Whiskey"
1289A	July 14, 2020	Colin Jost, Representative Val Demings	Davido
The One Guy Who Changed His Mind on Trump; Deb Brown; Hot Scripts with Zalman Terzian; Davido performed a medley of "D&G/Fall"
1290A	July 15, 2020	James McAvoy, Stacey Abrams	My Morning Jacket
Hallmark Wine Ad; What Are You Doing Wednesday?; Freestylin' with The Roots; My Morning Jacket performed "Spinning My Wheels"
1291A	July 16, 2020	Jim Carrey, Jenny Slate	Luke Combs
Ford Bronco Commercial; Tariq breaks down Peacock; Thank You Notes; Luke Combs performed "Lovin' on You"
1292A	July 20, 2020	David Schwimmer, Alison Brie	Jimmy Buffett
Donald Trump Cognitive Test; Tonight Show Do Not Play; Jimmy Buffett performed "Down at the Lah De Dah"
1293A	July 21, 2020	Andy Samberg, José Andrés	Perfume Genius
What Is Tariq Dreaming About?; Hayden & Peyton; Tonight Show Go On, Git!; Andy Samberg does ASMR; Perfume Genius performed "On the Floor"
1294A	July 22, 2020	Cameron Diaz, Mayor Keisha Lance Bottoms	Kygo with OneRepublic
What Are You Doing Wednesday?; Market Crunch; Cameron Diaz and Jimmy have wine; Kygo with OneRepublic performed "Lose Somebody"
1295A	July 23, 2020	Will Arnett, Michaela Coel	H.E.R.
Thank You Notes; Hey Robot... (Will Arnett); H.E.R. performed "Do to Me"
1296A	July 27, 2020	Mike Tyson, Adam DeVine	Chronixx
Kevin Cipriano; TikTok Career College Commercial; Jimmy acknowledges the death of Regis Philbin; Tonight Show #Blessed #Inspired; Chronixx performed "Cool as the Breeze/Friday"
1297A	July 28, 2020	Michael Che, Megan Rapinoe	Angel Olsen
Tariq's segment gets cut (Tariq and Jimmy performed "Just One"); Tonight Show So Let Me Get This Straight; Tonight Show #hashtags: #MySummerInSixWords; Tonight Show Go Off! (Michael Che); Angel Olsen performed "Whole New Mess"
1298A	July 29, 2020	Ice-T, Jack Whitehall	Charlie Wilson
Tech Leader Quotes; Donald Trump's Notes; Budweiser Zero Slogans; What Are You Doing Wednesday?; Jimmy portrays Mark Zuckerberg testifying before the United States Congress; Ice-T's daughter crashes the interview; Charlie Wilson performed "One I Got"
1299A	July 30, 2020	Seth Rogen, Chiwetel Ejiofor	Alanis Morissette
Tonight Show Oof! Yeesh! Oh God!!; Tonight Show This Week Made Right; Thank You Notes; Pickle Juice Challenge (Seth Rogen); Alanis Morissette performed "Ablaze"

=== August ===
No.	Original release date	Guest(s)	Musical/entertainment guest(s)
1300A	August 3, 2020	Common, Matisse Thybulle	Rufus Wainwright
Hayden & Peyton; Imagination Vacations Commercial; Rufus Wainwright performed "Trouble in Paradise"
1301A	August 4, 2020	Jesse Eisenberg, Blake Griffin	Gracie Abrams
Donald Trump Interview (Jimmy portrays Trump); Tonight Show #hashtags: #AddAWordRuinATVShow; Tonight Show Audience Suggestion Box (Jimmy plays the kazoo, audience member asks Jimmy to ask his girlfriend to marry him as well as that the New York Mets have a good season, HBO Min Commercial, Jimmy uses a Liam Neeson balloon); Gracie Abrams performed "I miss you, I'm sorry"
1302A	August 5, 2020	Jamie Foxx, Tig Notaro	Black Pumas
Parent Who Hasn't Considered Homeschooling; Celebrities Wish Each Other Happy Birthday; What Are You Doing Wednesday?; Tonight Show Auto–Tune Up! (Jamie Foxx); Black Pumas performed "Fire"
1303A	August 6, 2020	Matthew McConaughey, Jaden Smith	JADEN
Crystal Washington; Donald Trump Video; Tonight Show This Week Made Right; Thank You Notes; Tonight Show Off Songs Song Off (Matthew McConaughey); Tonight Show Selfie Expression (Jaden Smith); JADEN performed "Cabin Fever"
1304A	August 10, 2020	Bryan Cranston, Julia Garner	Surfaces
A Man of Many Hats (Bryan Cranston); Tonight Show Do Not Read; Surfaces performed "Sunday Best"
1305A	August 11, 2020	Orlando Bloom, Cecily Strong	Trey Anastasio
Joe Biden Virtual Conference (Jimmy portrays Biden); Tonight Show #hashtags: #SummerSongs2020; Trey Anastasio performed "I Never Needed You Like This Before", which became the first in-studio performance by a musical guest since Mandy Moore's appearance in episode 1224.
1306A	August 12, 2020	Joseph Gordon-Levitt, Paula Pell	Jessie Reyez
Donald Trump Presidential Address (Jimmy portrays Trump); Jimmy interviews eighth grader Riley Spellman; What Are You Doing Wednesday?; Tonight Show Watch–It–Once TikTok Challenge (Joseph Gordon-Levitt); Paula Pell does a comedy bit with her poodle; Jessie Reyez performed "Before Love Came to Kill Us"
1307A	August 13, 2020	Seth Meyers, David Blaine	Burna Boy
Donald Trump Campaign Ad; Pringles Slogans; Thank You Notes; Burna Boy performed "Wonderful/Monsters You Made"
1308A	August 17, 2020	Tiffany Haddish, Jurnee Smollett	Orville Peck & Shania Twain
2020 DNC Schedule; OAN; CCC Intros; Tonight Show Show Me Something Good; Tonight Show Wheel of Opinions (Tiffany Haddish); Orville Peck & Shania Twain performed "Legends Never Die"
1309A	August 18, 2020	Hugh Jackman, Lili Reinhart	Buju Banton
Tonight Show #hashtags: #MyCampaignSlogan; Lili Reinhart's dog crashes the interview; Buju Banton performed "The World Is Changing"
1310A	August 19, 2020	Tyler Perry, Maisie Williams	Trevor Daniel
Jimmy plays a man representing Rhode Island in the roll call of the 2020 DNC; What Are You Doing Wednesday?; Tonight Show Like Follow Block (Maisie Williams); Trevor Daniel performed "Falling/Past Life"
1311A	August 20, 2020	Rachel Maddow, Fred Armisen	Tiwa Savage
Thank You Notes; Fred Armisen shows SNL mementos; Tiwa Savage performed "Dangerous Love"

=== September ===
No.	Original release date	Guest(s)	Musical/entertainment guest(s)
1312A	September 8, 2020	Joel McHale, Big Sean	Big Sean
Jimmy checks in with Seth Meyers; The Tonight Show Aunts; Big Sean performed "Harder Than My Demons"
1313A	September 9, 2020	Kevin Hart, Josh Charles	Chika
Donald Trump practices acceptance speech in front of a mirror (Jimmy portrays Trump); What Are You Doing Wednesday?; Fill In My Blank; Chika performed "High Rises/Crown"
1314A	September 10, 2020	Miley Cyrus	Miley Cyrus
Tonight Show Go On, Git!; Freestylin' with The Roots: NFL Edition; Miley Cyrus performed "Midnight Sky/Maneater"
1315A	September 11, 2020	Kelly Clarkson, Joy Reid	The Flaming Lips
Donald Trump Message; Thank You Notes; Tonight Show Different Tune (Kelly Clarkson); The Flaming Lips performed "God and the Policeman"
1316A	September 14, 2020	Jude Law, Maya Erskine & Anna Konkle	Summer Walker
Crowd Reaction Sounds; Tonight Show Good Name Bad Name Great Name; Tonight Show Tariq's Irk List; Summer Walker performed "Body"
1317A	September 15, 2020	Ewan McGregor, Willie & Bobbie Nelson	Kesha
Artemis "Duncan" Lundquist; Tonight Show Talk Like Trump; Tonight Show Motorcycle Term Scottish Slang or Star Wars Word? (Ewan McGregor); Kesha performed "Children of the Revolution"
1318A	September 16, 2020	Sharon Stone, Shaquille O'Neal	Kylie Minogue
Team Weed/No Weed; What Are You Doing Wednesday?; Tonight Show Audience Suggestion Box (Jimmy reveals how he stays fit, Jimmy reveals self-control tips, Jimmy interviews the EA Sports guy, Jimmy karate chops a party sub); Vote Shaq (Shaquille O'Neal); Kylie Minogue performed "Say Something"
1319A	September 17, 2020	Seth MacFarlane, Evan Rachel Wood	Penn & Teller
What's Trending on Twitter; Tonight Show #hashtags: #NewFootballTraditions
1320A	September 18, 2020	Jessica Alba, Jack Huston	Keith Urban
Statement that the program was recorded before the news of the death of Ruth Bader Ginsburg at the top of the broadcast; Tariq and Jimmy have one last TikTok talk; Thank You Notes; Tonight Show Watch–It–Once TikTok Challenge (Jessica Alba); Keith Urban performed "Say Something"
1321A	September 21, 2020	Julianne Moore, Chace Crawford	Polo G
Jimmy acknowledges the death of Ruth Bader Ginsburg at the top of the program; Donald Trump Audio; a small business is highlighted at each commercial break; Tonight Show Polls; Tonight Show Show Me Something Good; Polo G performed "Martin & Gina"
1322A	September 22, 2020	Keira Knightley, Chelsea Clinton	Tame Impala
So You Want to Be a Supreme Court Justice Trailer; Tame Impala performed "Borderline"
1323A	September 23, 2020	Joy Reid, Derrick Johnson	Anitta featuring Cardi B & Myke Towers
Anitta featuring Cardi B & Myke Towers performed "Me Gusta"
1324A	September 24, 2020	Chris Rock, Jonathan Majors	Sasha Sloan
CDC PSA; New Emojis; How Was That Legal Until Now??; Tonight Show #hashtags: #HomeSchoolFail; Sasha Sloan performed "Lie"
1325A	September 25, 2020	Sting, Gugu Mbatha-Raw	Gashi featuring Sting
Donald Trump Letter to Richard Nixon; Penalty Box; Tonight Show Face Mask the Nation; What Are You Doing Wednesday?: Friday Edition; Thank You Notes; Gashi featuring Sting performed "Mama"
1326A	September 28, 2020	Jim Parsons, Shepard Smith	BTS
Donald Trump Video (Jimmy portrays Trump); Jimmy Fallon, The Roots & BTS performed "Dynamite"; BTS performed "Idol"
1327A	September 29, 2020	John Cena	BTS
Jimmy talks to John Cena at the top of the program; Jimmy and John Cena performed a song parody of "Reunited"; Tonight Show Toss It Over (John Cena); BTS performed "Home"
1328A	September 30, 2020	BTS, Chris Colfer, Steven Stamkos, Nikita Kucherov & Victor Hedman	BTS
Media Headlines; Tonight Show Dance Your Feelings (BTS); BTS performed "Black Swan"

=== October ===
No.	Original release date	Guest(s)	Musical/entertainment guest(s)
1329A	October 1, 2020	Michael Che & Colin Jost, Kaitlyn Dever	BTS
Carnival Cruise Line Ad; Tonight Show Joke Off (Michael Che & Colin Jost); Tonight Show Zoom Olympics (BTS); BTS performed "Mikrokosmos"; Jimmy performed "Puttin' On the Ritz" to end the show
1330A	October 2, 2020	Adam Sandler, Millie Bobby Brown	BTS
Thank You Notes; Lip Sync Battle (Millie Bobby Brown); BTS performed "Dynamite"
1331A	October 5, 2020	Daniel Craig, Billie Eilish & FINNEAS	Billie Eilish featuring FINNEAS
Tonight Show #hashtags: #IGotBusted; debut of exclusive clip from No Time to Die; Billie Eilish & FINNEAS create a remix song for Jimmy; Billie Eilish featuring FINNEAS performed "No Time to Die"
1332A	October 6, 2020	Lin-Manuel & Luis Miranda, Ruby Rose	The Highwomen
Mike Pence Debate Prep Footage (Jimmy portrays Pence); Tonight Show Father Son Challenge (Lin-Manuel & Luis Miranda); The Highwomen performed "Crowded Table"
1333A	October 7, 2020	Maya Rudolph, Matt Bomer	070 Shake
Jimmy stars in a lip sync video at the top of the program; What Are You Doing Wednesday?; Lon & Yvonne's Zoom Scat Duo (Maya Rudolph); 070 Shake performed "History/Guilty Conscience"
1334A	October 8, 2020	Eddie Redmayne, Guy Raz	Lele Pons x Guaynaa
Tariq notices bugs on Jimmy's head; Tonight Show Leaderboard 2020; Tonight Show Guitar Solo Battle with H.E.R. (H.E.R.); Lele Pons x Guaynaa performed "Se Te Nota"
1335A	October 9, 2020	Kevin James, Lenny Kravitz	Nate Bargatze
Dexamethasone Ad; Tonight Show This Week Made Right; Thank You Notes; Tonight Show Fake Off (Kevin James)
1336A	October 19, 2020	Gwen Stefani, Swizz Beatz & Timbaland	Bebe Rexha featuring Doja Cat
2020 Election Closing Arguments; Two Goats Who Will Vote (appearance by Lin-Manuel Miranda); Buck Pinto promotes Gwen's Gone Country (Gwen Stefani); Bebe Rexha featuring Doja Cat performed "Baby, I'm Jealous"
1337A	October 20, 2020	Natalie Portman, Billy Porter	Lous and the Yakuza
Republican Excuse Generator; 2020 Election Closing Arguments; The Roots rap about PA ballots; Lous and the Yakuza performed "Amigo"
1338A	October 21, 2020	Anthony Mackie, Lily James	Black Thought featuring Portugal. The Man & The Last Artful, Dodgr
2020 Election Closing Arguments; What Are You Doing Wednesday?; Tonight Show Mad Lib Theater (Anthony Mackie); Black Thought featuring Portugal. The Man & The Last Artful, Dodgr performed "Quiet Trip/Nature of the Beast"
1339A	October 22, 2020	Julia Louis-Dreyfus, Patton Oswalt	Of Monsters and Men
2020 Election Closing Arguments; Tonight Show #hashtags: #TheDebateInSixWords; Of Monsters and Men performed "Visitor"
1340A	October 23, 2020	Chelsea Handler, Senator Bernie Sanders	The War on Drugs
Jimmy announces his new children's book; Thank You Notes; The War on Drugs performed "Ocean of Darkness"
1341A	October 26, 2020	Sterling K. Brown, Zoe Lister-Jones, Matthew "Super" DeLisi	Rina Sawayama
Mike Pence Doctor Audio; Freestylin' with The Roots; Rina Sawayama performed "XS"
1342A	October 27, 2020	Shawn Mendes, Tig Notaro	Shawn Mendes
2020 Vs. 1908 Voting; Masculine Man Masks Commercial; Tonight Show Do Not Read; Shawn Mendes performed "Intro/Wonder"
1343A	October 28, 2020	Ken Jeong, Mayor Pete Buttigieg	Sam Hunt
Julio Torres; What Are You Doing Wednesday?; Tonight Show Freaky Face Off (Ken Jeong); Sam Hunt performed "Breaking Up Was Easy in the 90s"
1344A	October 29, 2020	America Ferrera, David Dobrik, Corey Seager	Brothers Osborne
The follow-up song to "Monster Mash", "Hangover Mash"; Tonight Show #hashtags: #NewHalloweenTraditions; David Dobrik sends Jimmy a gift; Brothers Osborne performed "All Night"
1345A	October 30, 2020	Nick Offerman, Stacey Abrams	Busta Rhymes featuring Anderson .Paak
Politician Halloween Plans; Thank You Notes; Tonight Show Audience Suggestion Box (Tariq and Jimmy act like they're in a Lifetime Christmas film, Jimmy bobs for apples – and gets an iPhone, The Undertaker combines wrestling with Halloween, Black Simon & Garfunkel); Busta Rhymes featuring Anderson .Paak performed "YUUUU"

=== November ===
No.	Original release date	Guest(s)	Musical/entertainment guest(s)
1346A	November 2, 2020	Anthony Anderson, Senator Elizabeth Warren	Big Boi and Sleepy Brown featuring Killer Mike and Big Rube
Fidgey Whatsy Ad; Premature Election Ad; 2020 Election Closing Arguments; Tonight Show Polls; Big Boi and Sleepy Brown featuring Killer Mike and Big Rube performed "We the Ones"
1347A	November 4, 2020	Sarah Silverman, Dua Lipa, Steve Kornacki	Common featuring Black Thought and PJ
Jimmy remembers his mother on the third anniversary of her death; What Are You Doing Wednesday?; Common featuring Black Thought and PJ performed "Say Peace"
1348A	November 5, 2020	Kenan Thompson, Kate Mara	James Blake
Tonight Show Show Me Something Good; Tonight Show Think Fast! (Kenan Thompson); James Blake performed "Godspeed"
1349A	November 6, 2020	Milo Ventimiglia, Marc Maron	Oneohtrix Point Never
Jimmy performed a parody song about the election; Thank You Notes; Oneohtrix Point Never performed "I Don't Love Me Anymore"
1350A	November 9, 2020	Kaley Cuoco, Megan Rapinoe	Josh Johnson
Politician Voicemails; Jimmy surprises Steve Kornacki at his office; Tonight Show Go On, Git!; Tonight Show Pilot Voice Challenge (Kaley Cuoco)
1351A	November 10, 2020	Vince Vaughn, Lorraine Bracco	Gus Dapperton
Biden's Plan for Economic Recovery/Healthcare/Foreign Policy; Tonight Show Picture This; Gus Dapperton performed "Post Humorous"
1352A	November 11, 2020	Michael Strahan, Brené Brown	Patty Smyth
US Citizenship Test; Patty Smyth and Jimmy performed a parody of "Goodbye to You"; Freestylin' with The Roots; Playing a Round with Michael Strahan (Michael Strahan); Patty Smyth performed "Build a Fire"
1353A	November 12, 2020	James Spader, Chris Paul	21 Savage x Metro Boomin
Tariq is tired of the news (Breaking News); Statue Quotes; Nick Ciarelli & Brad Evans are interviewed; Tonight Show #hashtags: #TimeToMove; 21 Savage x Metro Boomin performed "Runnin'/Mr. Right Now"
1354A	November 13, 2020	Post Malone, Phoebe Robinson	2 Chainz
Tonight Show News Smash; Jimmy recreates "Therefore I Am" music video; Thank You Notes; Jimmy says hello to Post Malone's stepmom during the interview; Every Drinking Game Ever (Post Malone); 2 Chainz performed "Can't Go for That"
1355A	November 16, 2020	Chance the Rapper, Erin Andrews	G Herbo featuring Chance the Rapper
Jimmy plays a video game with Donald Trump at the top of the program (Jimmy portrays Trump); The Concession Speech We All Deserve; Tonight Show Drop It In; Tonight Show Kid Raps (Chance the Rapper); G Herbo featuring Chance the Rapper performed "PTSD"
1356A	November 17, 2020	Whoopi Goldberg, Emma Corrin	Dierks Bentley
Jimmy thinks about Hungry Hungry Hippos at the top of the program; Tweets Vs. Fleets; Jimmy shoots virtual hoops with Anthony Edwards, James Wiseman & Obi Toppin; Tonight Show Do Not Play; Whoopi Goldberg brings Jimmy a cupcake; Dierks Bentley performed "Gone"
1357A	November 18, 2020	Dan Levy, Michael J. Fox	Julia Michaels
Jimmy and The Roots wear pajamas for the night's broadcast; Jimmy explains the COVID vaccines through song; 73 Qs with Harry Styles (Jimmy portrays Styles); Tonight Show Best Worst First (Dan Levy); Julia Michaels performed "Lie Like This"
1358A	November 19, 2020	Sarah Paulson, Henry Golding	Car Seat Headrest
What's Trending & Why; Tonight Show #hashtags: #NewThanksgivingTraditions; Tonight Show Guess the Impression (Sarah Paulson); Car Seat Headrest performed "Can't Cool Me Down"
1359A	November 20, 2020	Leslie Mann, Colin Quinn	SAINt JHN
Donald Trump Responses to Legal Terms; Overstated with Colin Quinn (Colin Quinn); Thank You Notes; SAINt JHN performed "Sucks to Be You"
1360A	November 23, 2020	Emma Stone, Ben Falcone	Josh Groban
Sidney Powell Farewell Email; Tonight Show Interesting Polls; Tonight Show News & Improved; Josh Groban performed "The World We Knew (Over and Over)"
1361A	November 24, 2020	Joe Scarborough & Mika Brzezinski, Paul Bettany	Internet Money featuring Gunna, Don Toliver and Nav
Joe Biden Voicemail; In Lighter News; Jimmy talks about being name-dropped in Lifetime Christmas films; Internet Money featuring Gunna, Don Toliver and Nsv performed "Lemonade"
1362A	November 25, 2020	Melissa McCarthy, the original cast of Saved by the Bell	Sheryl Crow
Joe Biden Vs. Donald Trump White House Official Briefings; Jimmy & The Roots slam Chris Evans for being great at everything; Tonight Show #hashtags: #CookingFail; Sheryl Crow performed "You Don't Know How It Feels"
1363A	November 26, 2020	Jerry Seinfeld, Bad Bunny	Bad Bunny
Thank You Notes; Tonight Show Seinfeld Challenge (Jerry Seinfeld); Tonight Show Auto–Tune Up (Bad Bunny); Bad Bunny performed "Yo Visto Así"
1364A	November 30, 2020	Nick Kroll, Lily Collins	Matt Berninger
Tonight Show Go On, Git!; Tonight Show Guess the Impression (Nick Kroll); Matt Berninger performed "I'm Waiting for the Man"

=== December ===
No.	Original release date	Guest(s)	Musical/entertainment guest(s)
1365A	December 1, 2020	Keanu Reeves & Alex Winter, Joe Manganiello	The Smashing Pumpkins
Fallonlore: The 30 Rock Sessions; Joe Manganiello's dog makes an appearance during the interview; The Smashing Pumpkins performed "Cyr"
1366A	December 2, 2020	Jamie Dornan, Lisa Robinson	Phoebe Bridgers
Jimmy Fallon for-year annual question interview; What Are You Doing Wednesday?; Tonight Show Like Follow Block (Jamie Dornan); Phoebe Bridgers performed "Savior Complex"
1367A	December 3, 2020	Jason Bateman, Carrie Underwood	Carrie Underwood
Government Official Film Extra Work; Tonight Show 12 Days of Christmas Sweaters; Tonight Show #hashtags: #AddAWordRuinAChristmasSong; Carrie Underwood performed "O Holy Night"
1368A	December 4, 2020	President Barack Obama	Liam Gallagher
Tonight Show 12 Days of Christmas Sweaters; Tonight Show Obama Settles It (Barack Obama); Liam Gallagher performed "All You're Dreaming Of"
1369A	December 7, 2020	Mariah Carey, Andrew Rannells	José Feliciano
Tariq plays Giuliani Bingo; Georgia Runoff Election Closing Arguments; Bob Dylan Interview (Jimmy portrays Dylan); Tonight Show 12 Days of Christmas Sweaters (Tonight Show Christmas Sweaters Day 10 Winner); 2020: The Musical (appearance by Andrew Rannells); José Feliciano performed "Feliz Navidad"
1370A	December 8, 2020	Taraji P. Henson, Chloe Fineman	FINNEAS
Republican Quotes; Ikea Catalogue Tribute; Tonight Show 12 Days of Christmas Sweaters; Tonight Show Show Me Something Good; Chloe Fineman does impressions while reading "'Twas the Night Before Christmas"; FINNEAS performed "Another Year"
1371A	December 9, 2020	Jon Hamm, Meghan Trainor	Meghan Trainor featuring Earth, Wind & Fire
News Smash; Google Least Searched Terms in 2020; Tonight Show 12 Days of Christmas Sweaters (Tonight Show Christmas Sweaters Day 8 Winner); Jon Hamm's dog shows up during the interview; Tonight Show Honestly... (Jon Hamm); Tonight Show Google Translate Songs (Meghan Trainor); Meghan Trainor featuring Earth, Wind & Fire performed "Holidays"
1372A	December 10, 2020	Bruce Springsteen, J Balvin	Mandy Moore
Presidential Inaugurations: Betcha Didn't Know!; Santa Claus Music Video (appearance by Lil Nas X); Tonight Show 12 Days of Christmas Sweaters; Mandy Moore performed "How Could This Be Christmas?"
1373A	December 11, 2020	Kristen Bell, Sienna Miller	Kelly Clarkson & Brett Eldredge
Trump Administration Magazine Covers; Notifications; Tonight Show 12 Days of Christmas Sweaters (Tonight Show Christmas Sweaters Day 6 Winner); Thank You Notes; Kristen Bell performed an original song with a friend; Kelly Clarkson & Brett Eldredge performed "Under the Mistletoe"
1374A	December 14, 2020	Gal Gadot, Ricky Martin	Lana Del Rey
Jimmy Fallon, The Roots & the cast of Saved by the Bell performed the Saved by the Bell theme song; Tonight Show 12 Days of Christmas Sweaters; Gal Gadot and Jimmy try different foods; Lana Del Rey performed "Let Me Love You Like a Woman"
1375A	December 15, 2020	Kristen Wiig, Graham Norton	Jack Harlow
Tariq wants to talk about something not in the news; Tonight Show 12 Days of Christmas Sweaters (Tonight Show Christmas Sweaters Day 4 Winner); Kristen Wiig names stunts; Tonight Show Mimic Challenge (Kristen Wiig); Jack Harlow performed "Rendezvous/Way Out"
1376A	December 16, 2020	Tina Fey, Patty Jenkins	Marcus King
Celebrity Audio Tapes; What Are You Doing Wednesday?; Tonight Show 12 Days of Christmas Sweaters; Tonight Show One Second Pixar Quiz (Tina Fey); Marcus King performed "Wildflowers & Wine"
1377A	December 17, 2020	Paul McCartney, Pedro Pascal	The Voidz
Dua Lipa and Jimmy performed an original holiday song; Tonight Show 12 Days of Christmas Sweaters (Tonight Show Christmas Sweaters Day 2 Winner); The Voidz performed "Alien Crime Lord"
1378A	December 18, 2020	Olivia Colman, Lucas Hedges, Barry Gibb	Jhené Aiko with Nas
News Headlines; Jimmy updates "'Twas the Night Before Christmas"; Tonight Show 12 Days of Christmas Sweaters (Tonight Show Christmas Sweaters Day 1 Winner); Thank You Notes; Jhené Aiko with Nas performed "10k Hours"
