= List of The Tonight Show Starring Jimmy Fallon episodes (2019) =

- No. of episodes: 193

Release
- Original network: NBC

Season chronology
- ← Previous; 2018 episodes Next → 2020 episodes

This is the list of episodes for The Tonight Show Starring Jimmy Fallon in 2019.

== 2019 ==
=== January ===
| No. | Original release date | Guest(s) | Musical/entertainment guest(s) |
|---|---|---|---|
| 988 | January 7, 2019 | James Spader, Lindsay Lohan | Noname featuring Smino & Saba |
Jimmy, The Roots and Steve Higgins dance with Lindsay Lohan in cold open; Donald Trump/Chuck Schumer Tweets; Tonight Show News & Improved; The Tonight Show Turn It Up: "Since U Been Gone" (appearance by Kelly Clarkson, Shaquille O'Neal, John Oliver, Rachel Brosnahan, Mumford & Sons, Meghan Trainor and Anthony Anderson); Kermit the Frog and Jimmy performed "Rainbow Connection" and announce the Doodle4Google contest; Noname featuring Smino & Saba performed "Ace"
| 989 | January 8, 2019 | Andy Samberg, Alfonso Cuarón | Dan + Shay |
Senator Part–Time Jobs; Tariq quits alcohol for the month; Jimmy performed "Escape (The Piña Colada Song)" (appearance by Andy Samberg); Dan + Shay performed "Speechless"
| 990 | January 9, 2019 | Gwyneth Paltrow, Tony Hale | Trippie Redd |
Politician Twins; Slay It, Don't Spray It (Gwyneth Paltrow); Jimmy takes the "How Goopy Are You?" quiz; Gwyneth Paltrow teaches Jimmy how to foam roll; Trippie Redd performed "Topanga"
| 991 | January 10, 2019 | Bryan Cranston, Lana Condor | Love Jones |
Tonight Show Trump Magic 8 Ball; Tonight Show #hashtags: #5WordResolution; Unreleased Netflix Film (Bryan Cranston, Lana Condor); Love Jones performed "Here's to the Losers/Ohio River" (featuring Jimmy on "Ohio River")
| 992 | January 11, 2019 | Michael B. Jordan, Cobie Smulders | Sean Finnerty |
Michael B. Jordan and Cobie Smulders text Thanos to murder Jimmy in the cold open; Tonight Show Superlatives; Thank You Notes; Pour It Out (Michael B. Jordan)
| 993 | January 14, 2019 | Samuel L. Jackson, Judd Apatow | MØ |
Beer Labels; Poetry Slam the News (appearance by Samuel L. Jackson); Samuel L. Jackson Breaks Down the Top 5 Characters Played by Samuel L. Jackson; MØ performed "Blur"
| 994 | January 15, 2019 | Lin-Manuel Miranda & Hamilton cast, José Andrés, Bad Bunny | José Feliciano & Ozuna |
Special episode taping in Puerto Rico; Questlove and Tariq quiz Jimmy on Puerto Rico in the cold open; Jimmy makes a guest appearance in Hamilton to perform "The Story of Tonight"; Bad Bunny and Jimmy performed "Mia" on the streets of Old San Juan, Puerto Rico; Jimmy interviews Lin-Manuel Miranda backstage on the set of Hamilton; Jimmy and Tariq ride The Monster zip-line; Jimmy and José Andrés try Puerto Rican cuisine; José Feliciano & Ozuna performed "En mi Viejo San Juan"
| 995 | January 16, 2019 | Don Cheadle, Rita Ora | Rita Ora |
Donald Trump Book; Spider-Man: Far From Home Parody Trailer; Tonight Show Polls; Dwayne Johnson challenges Jimmy to drag a 250–lb. rock across the studio; Tonight Show One Word Songs (Rita Ora); Rita Ora performed "Let You Love Me"
| 996 | January 17, 2019 | Rachel Brosnahan, Howie Mandel | Roy Wood Jr. |
Instagram Responses; Tonight Show Face Off: Giuliani Edition; FBI Investigations; Tonight Show #hashtags: #7WordSuperpower; Tonight Show Word Sneak (Rachel Brosnahan)
| 997 | January 18, 2019 | Elizabeth Banks, Sebastian Maniscalco, Martha Stewart | N/A |
Tonight Show Superlatives; Black Mirror: Bandersnatch Parody; Thank You Notes; Double Tool Belt Challenge (Martha Stewart)
| 998 | January 21, 2019 | Kerry Washington, JoJo Siwa | Joe Jackson |
BuzzFeed Headlines; Democrat Tweets; Tonight Show This Week in Memes; Kerry Washington signs Jimmy's book; Tonight Show Aggressive Dance–Off (JoJo Siwa); Joe Jackson performed "Fabulously Absolute"
| 999 | January 22, 2019 | Gina Rodriguez, Lil Rel Howery | Brothers Osborne |
Donald Trump Film Reviews; Donald Trump Academy Award Nominations; Rod Williams (Lil Rel Howery); Donald Trump Inner Thoughts from The White House; Freestylin' with The Roots; Brothers Osborne performed "I Don't Remember Me Before You"
| 1000 | January 23, 2019 | Molly Shannon, Zachary Quinto, Robert Irwin | N/A |
Donald Trump Tweets; Donald Trump Statements; Tonight Show Talk Like Trump; Tonight Show Think Fast! (Molly Shannon); Freestyle Rap
| 1001 | January 24, 2019 | Jada Pinkett Smith | Backstreet Boys |
Senator/Congressmen Quotes; Weed Spokesperson Quotes; Blended News Stories; Tonight Show #hashtags: #ItShouldBeIllegalTo; Backstreet Boys and Jimmy performed "Everybody (Backstreet's Back)" in chicken costumes; Tonight Show Spamologues (Jada Pinkett Smith); Backstreet Boys performed "Chances"
| 1002 | January 25, 2019 | Matt LeBlanc, Nikki & Brie Bella | Jo Firestone |
Matt LeBlanc and Jimmy debate how many claps are in the Friends theme at the top of the program; Textbook Vs. YouTube; Veasy Listening; Thank You Notes
| 1003 | January 28, 2019 | Shaquille O'Neal, Colin Quinn | 21 Savage |
Tonight Show News & Improved; What's Behind Me? (Shaquille O'Neal); Shaquille O'Neal brings Jimmy a fish head necklace; 21 Savage performed "A Lot"
| 1004 | January 29, 2019 | Matthew Broderick, Spike Lee, Maddie Ziegler, Alysa Liu | Yo Gotti featuring Lil Baby |
Politician Notepads; Maddie Ziegler shows Jimmy bad dance moves; Alysa Liu shows Jimmy a skating ritual; Yo Gotti featuring Lil Baby performed "Put a Date on It"
| 1005 | January 30, 2019 | Kenan Thompson, Luis Fonsi | Luis Fonsi |
Tim Bennigan; State of the Union Address Vs. the Super Bowl; Tonight Show Popular Mathematics; Kenan Thompson takes an Instagram video; Tonight Show Face It Challenge (Kenan Thompson); Luis Fonsi and Jimmy performed "Despacito" with different lyrics; Luis Fonsi performed "Imposible"
| 1006 | January 31, 2019 | Seth Meyers, Danai Gurira | Dan White |
Howard Schultz 2020 Campaign Message; Tonight Show Game Day Superstitions; Tonight Show #hashtags: #WorstSuperBowlPartyEver; Seth Meyers shows a thank you note from Rihanna

=== February ===
| No. | Original release date | Guest(s) | Musical/entertainment guest(s) |
|---|---|---|---|
| 1007 | February 1, 2019 | Anthony Mackie, Tim Gunn | Matthew Broussard |
Super Bowl Odds; Democrat Speech Advice; Tonight Show Deep Issues, Deep Tissues: Super Bowl Edition; Thank You Notes; Tonight Show Puppy Predictors: 2019 Super Bowl Edition; Anthony Mackie signs Jimmy's book; Tonight Show Snail Bowl Announcement
| 1008 | February 4, 2019 | Christoph Waltz, Rory McIlroy | The Band's Visit |
Trump Filters; Trump Administration Quotes; Cory Booker Presidential Campaign Slogans; Punxsutawney Phil Vs. Staten Island Chuck; Tonight Show The Big Question; Christoph Waltz quizzes Jimmy on the German language; The Happy Gilmore Putting Challenge (Rory McIlroy); The Band's Visit performed "Omar Sharif"
| 1009 | February 5, 2019 | Priyanka Chopra Jonas, Henry Winkler, Savannah Guthrie | Lizzo |
Donald Trump takes questions after the State of the Union Address at the top of the program; TV Network Statements; State of the Union Address Seating Chart; Henry Winkler reads from his children's book; Lizzo performed "Juice"
| 1010 | February 6, 2019 | Liam Hemsworth, Jessica Williams, Rob Gronkowski | Ronnie Milsap featuring Little Big Town |
Tariq missed the State of the Union Address; Jimmy bumps into Liam Hemsworth while waiting for the elevator; Catchphrase (Liam Hemsworth & Jessica Williams Vs. Jimmy Fallon & Rob Gronkowski); Ronnie Milsap featuring Little Big Town performed "Lost in the Fifties Tonight (In the Still of the Night)"
| 1011 | February 7, 2019 | Kim Kardashian West, James Cameron, Christina Tosi | N/A |
Tonight Show Goodnight News; Jimmy gives audience cookies; Tonight Show #hashtags: #MisheardLyrics; Tonight Show Can You Feel It? (Kim Kardashian West)
| 1012 | February 8, 2019 | Rebel Wilson, Willie Geist | Nathan Macintosh |
Politician Fashion Week; Erykah Badu sits in with The Roots; Thank You Notes; Tonight Show Beat Battle (Rebel Wilson)
| 1013 | February 11, 2019 | Adam Sandler, Stephen Merchant, Big Bird | Metro Boomin featuring Gunna |
Tonight Show Do Not Play; Adam Sandler plays guitar; Adam Sandler performed an original song; Metro Boomin featuring Gunna performed "Space Cadet"
| 1014 | February 12, 2019 | Will Forte, Gigi Hadid, Blake Mycoskie | Gashi featuring G-Eazy |
Audience member reads Donald Trump remarks; Ew! sketch (with Priyanka Chopra Jonas); Tonight Show Challenges; Will Forte and Jimmy do a MacGruber scene; Gigi Hadid and Jimmy have burgers; Gashi featuring G-Eazy performed "My Year"
| 1015 | February 13, 2019 | Steve Martin & Martin Short, Tim Tebow | Avril Lavigne |
Valentines Day Cards; Tonight Show Gifs; Tonight Show Greatest Moments!; Tonight Show Know It All (Steve Martin & Martin Short); Avril Lavigne performed "Head Above Water"
| 1016 | February 14, 2019 | Kendall Jenner, Fred Armisen | Florida Georgia Line |
Candy Hearts; Tonight Show Food or Not Food (Kendall Jenner); Girl Scouts of the USA troop highlight charity; Fred Armisen and Jimmy re-enact a sleeping game; Fred Armisen does impressions; Florida Georgia Line performed "Talk You Out of It"
| 1017 | February 18, 2019 | Jeff Daniels, Paul Shaffer | Wallows |
Past US Presidents Vs. Donald Trump; Tariq and Jimmy duel each other on US Presidents; Tonight Show Drop It In; Tonight Show Talk Like Trump; Jeff Daniels and Jimmy have rice cakes with peanut butter and barbecue sauce; Wallows performed "Are You Bored Yet?"
| 1018 | February 19, 2019 | Jake Gyllenhaal, Jennifer Carpenter | Walk the Moon |
Democratic Presidential Candidate Rumors; The Case of Donald Trump v. US States; Bernie Sanders 2020 Presidential Candidacy Announcement Video; Tonight Show Polls; Walk the Moon performed "Timebomb"
| 1019 | February 20, 2019 | Hoda Kotb, Daveed Diggs | Mo Amer |
The Anatomy of Floors; Jimmy tweets YouTube to break 20,000,000 subscribers for The Tonight Show Starring Jimmy Fallon channel; Freestylin' with The Roots; The Tonight Show Starring Jimmy Fallon becomes the first late-night talk show with 20,000,000 YouTube subscribers; Daveed Diggs performed a snippet of "At This Point"
| 1020 | February 21, 2019 | Ken Jeong, Kate Upton | Anderson Paak |
Vladimir Putin Film Reviews; Tonight Show #hashtags: #ImproveAMovieWithOneWord; Kate Upton teaches Jimmy a workout exercise; Jimmy celebrates 20,000,000 YouTube subscribers; Anderson Paak performed "Trippy"
| 1021 | February 22, 2019 | John Legend, Hasan Minhaj | John Legend |
Donald Trump Question Answers; Thank You Notes; John Legend reads written prediction about his future from years ago; Lip Sync Karaoke (John Legend); John Legend performed "Preach"
| 1022 | February 25, 2019 | Tina Fey, Robert Irwin | Florida Georgia Line |
Tribute to The Larry Sanders Show on the fifth anniversary (appearances by Ben Stiller, Tina Fey, Lorne Michaels, Robert Irwin, Florida Georgia Line and Robert De Niro); Ben Stiller makes an appearance as Hashtag the Panda; Florida Georgia Line performed "Colorado"
| 1023 | February 26, 2019 | Tyler Perry, Sarah Hyland | Weezer |
The Ragtime Gals performed "Buddy Holly" by Weezer (with Weezer) at the top of the program; Donald Trump Question Answers; Tonight Show Fact Check; Tonight Show News & Improved; Tonight ShowBotics (audience received a $100 FedEx gift card); Weezer performed "Living in L.A."
| 1024 | February 27, 2019 | Jessica Chastain, Patton Oswalt, Katy Tur | Gary Clark Jr. |
Donald Trump Checks; Donald Trump Instagram Photos; Jessica Chastain debuts exclusive first look at Dark Phoenix; Jessica Chastain takes a BuzzFeed quiz; Gary Clark Jr. performed "What About Us"
| 1025 | February 28, 2019 | John Mulaney, Kevin Nealon | 2 Chainz featuring Marsha Ambrosius |
Fake Amazon.com Reviews; The Roots make monologue jokes; Jimmy Fallon, Weezer & The Roots sing "Take On Me" with classroom instruments; Tonight Show True Confessions (John Mulaney, Pete Davidson); 2 Chainz featuring Marsha Ambrosius performed "Forgiven"

=== March ===
| No. | Original release date | Guest(s) | Musical/entertainment guest(s) |
|---|---|---|---|
| 1026 | March 1, 2019 | Ryan Seacrest, Jack Whitehall | Shin Lim |
Joseph Davis; Thank You Notes; Jimmy gets a flu shot (appearance by Mehmet Oz); Jack Whitehall appears in Frozen on Broadway
| 1027 | March 11, 2019 | Ricky Gervais, Karlie Kloss | Maren Morris |
Tonight Show This Week in Memes; Tonight Show Singing in the Face (Ricky Gervais); Tonight Show Jinx Challenge (Karlie Kloss); Maren Morris performed "Girl"
| 1028 | March 12, 2019 | Keira Knightley, Jon Glaser | The Chainsmokers and 5 Seconds of Summer |
Tariq raps about presidential candidates; Nigel Duffy; Jimmy mixes sounds to celebrate the World Wide Web's 30th birthday; Keira Knightley plays her teeth; Musical Beers (Jimmy Fallon, The Chainsmokers and 5 Seconds of Summer); The Chainsmokers and 5 Seconds of Summer performed "Who Do You Love"
| 1029 | March 13, 2019 | Mark Ruffalo, Jim Jefferies | Normani featuring 6lack |
Presidential Candidate Campaign Music; Presidential Candidate Poll; Tonight Show Interesting Polls; Jay Leno subs in for Jimmy during the monologue; Mark Ruffalo gets hooked up to a lie detector while potentially spoiling Avengers: Endgame; Jimmy gives audience members t-shirts; Normani featuring 6lack performed "Waves"
| 1030 | March 14, 2019 | Oscar Isaac, Lilly Singh | Jimmy Carr |
Beto O'Rourke Presidential Campaign Announcement Parody at the top of the program; Social Media Tweets; Tonight Show Drop It In; GE Tonight Show Fallonventions: Kid's Inventions; Jimmy gives audience members t-shirts; Lilly Singh announces her new late-night talk show, A Little Late with Lilly Singh, and Jimmy and Seth Meyers congratulate her on joining the NBC late-night family
| 1031 | March 15, 2019 | Ice-T, Russell Wilson | Ozuna |
A St. Patrick's Day Safety Message from Ice-T (appearance by Ice-T); Drunk People Try to Do Things; Thank You Notes; Random Object Target Practice (Russell Wilson); Ozuna performed "Baila Baila Baila/Taki Taki"
| 1032 | March 18, 2019 | Jordan Peele, Malcolm Gladwell, Marlon du Toit | Sharon Van Etten |
NCAA Participant Quotes; The Roots, an audience member and Jimmy announce they are running for US President; Harry Potter Character Secrets; Jimmy and The Roots Play Scream Go Hero; Tonight Show 3 Point & Slam Dunk Contest; Sharon Van Etten performed "Comeback Kid"
| 1033 | March 19, 2019 | Kobe Bryant, Aidy Bryant, Natalie Morales | Fletcher |
Tonight Show Presidential Charades; Jimmy says goodbye to the winter season; Tonight Show Hey World (Aidy Bryant); Fletcher performed "Undrunk"
| 1034 | March 20, 2019 | Armie Hammer, Jemaine Clement | Schoolboy Q |
Jimmy urges Joe Biden to announce that he's running for US President; Democratic Voter Quotes; Tonight Show Deep Issues Deep Tissues; Jimmy, Steve Higgins and The Roots go over their March Madness brackets; Tonight Show Audience Suggestion Box (Shaq Bracket, Hold Music (appearance by Jemaine Clement), Jimmy gets "cheesed" by the Fordham Rams); Schoolboy Q performed "Numb Numb Juice/Chopstix". An abbreviated version of the introduction debuted.
| 1035 | March 21, 2019 | Julia Louis-Dreyfus, Joel Kinnaman | Ain't Too Proud |
World Leader Quotes; Tonight Show Can You Dance It?; Tonight Show #hashtags: #SpringBreakHaiku; Box of Lies (Julia Louis-Dreyfus); Joel Kinnaman and Jimmy have drinks; Ain't Too Proud performed "Get Ready/Ain't Too Proud to Beg"
| 1036 | March 22, 2019 | Norman Reedus, Ilana Glazer, Mikaela Shiffrin | James Veitch |
Presidential Candidate Leading Poll Questions; Tonight Show News Flub Final Four; Tonight Show Grams; Thank You Notes; Mikaela Shiffrin teaches Jimmy the shuffle dance and gives him a ski card
| 1037 | March 25, 2019 | Conor McGregor, Michael Che, Rachel Feinstein, Frank Pellegrino Jr. | N/A |
Entire show shot on a Samsung Galaxy S10+; Jimmy and The Roots sing an a cappella version of "In the Still of the Night"; Conor McGregor and Jimmy have drinks at an Irish pub; Jimmy interviews Michael Che at the Comedy Cellar; Rachel Feinstein performs at the Comedy Cellar; Jimmy interviews Frank Pellegrino Jr. at Rao's and learns how to make meatballs; Jimmy brings Rao's pasta and meatballs to the NY Fire Department; Jimmy sees The Roots perform at the Django jazz club

=== April ===
| No. | Original release date | Guest(s) | Musical/entertainment guest(s) |
|---|---|---|---|
| 1038 | April 1, 2019 | Tracy Morgan, Maisie Williams, Patrick Mahomes | The Zombies |
Tariq reviews Dumbo; everyone checks their March Madness brackets; Maisie Williams gives away a Game of Thrones spoiler as an April Fools Day joke; The Zombies performed "Time of the Season"
| 1039 | April 2, 2019 | Sam Rockwell, Kathie Lee Gifford | Oklahoma! |
The Roots have difficulty pronouncing Pete Buttigieg's name; Jimmy declares that he is not Batman; Applebee's Strawberry Dollarita Slogans; Tonight Show Baby Memes; Oklahoma! performed "I Cain't Say No"
| 1040 | April 3, 2019 | Alec Baldwin, Kelly Clarkson | Kelly Clarkson |
Republican/Democratic Leader Quotes; Tonight Show Kid Trash Talk (appearance by WWE Superstars); Alec Baldwin's birthday celebration (appearance by Emilio Estevez, Kelly Clarkson); Kelly Clarkson performed "Broken & Beautiful"
| 1041 | April 4, 2019 | Kit Harington, Elle Fanning | Khalid |
Tonight Show Interesting Polls; GOT or Ikea (appearance by Kit Harington); Jimmy announces his new children's book; Tonight Show Grams; Kit Harington supposedly confirms and denies Game of Thrones rumors; Speed Singing (Elle Fanning); Khalid performed "Talk"
| 1042 | April 5, 2019 | Taraji P. Henson, Jason Clarke | Nate Bargatze |
Tonight Show Trump Magic 8 Ball; Tonight Show News Flub Final Four; Thank You Notes; Puppy Predictors: 2019 Final Four Edition
| 1043 | April 8, 2019 | Hugh Jackman, Chrissy Metz, Jennifer Kupcho & Maria Fassi | Juice Wrld |
Elizabeth II Buckingham Palace Invitation Letter to Donald Trump; Tonight Show News & Improved; Hugh Jackman and Jimmy catch quarters on their elbows and trade blazers; Chrissy Metz beatboxes; Juice Wrld performed "Hear Me Calling"
| 1044 | April 9, 2019 | Chelsea Handler, Justin Hartley | Brooks & Dunn featuring Midland |
I Don't Have Time for This (appearance by Lester Holt); Game of Thrones Parody (appearance by Sean Bean, George R. R. Martin); Bernard Purdie & Chuck Rainey sit in with The Roots; Tonight Show Screengrabs; Brooks & Dunn featuring Midland performed "Boot Scootin' Boogie"
| 1045 | April 10, 2019 | Drew Barrymore, Lily Collins, Terry Gilliam | Beast Coast |
Presidential Candidate Poll; Vladimir Putin Sayings; Game of Thrones Music Album; Drew Barrymore and Jimmy lip sync "The Loco-Motion" in New York; Drew Barrymore and Jimmy do a catalog photoshoot; Beast Coast performed "Left Hand"
| 1046 | April 11, 2019 | Emma Stone, Tracy Pollan & Michael J. Fox | Tank and the Bangas |
Strain of Bones; Tonight Show #hashtags: #IfIHadTheThrone; Jimmy takes questions from the audience; Tank and the Bangas performed "Nice Things"
| 1047 | April 12, 2019 | Ethan Hawke, Dwyane Wade, Kate del Castillo | Ronny Chieng |
Ken Burns Beyoncé Documentary Clip; In Lighter News; Tonight Show Can You Dance It?; Thank You Notes
| 1048 | April 15, 2019 | Cher | Cher and The Cher Show Cast |
Cher comes out with Jimmy to start the show; Jimmy goes over the news stories in quick succession; Tariq did not pay his taxes; Pete Buttigieg Presidential Candidacy Announcement; Lip Sync Karaoke (Cher); Cher and The Cher Show Cast performed "If I Could Turn Back Time"
| 1049 | April 16, 2019 | Alex Rodriguez, Ashley Benson | Jade Bird |
Bill Weld Presidential Campaign Slogans; Ron Wybrow; Tonight Show Talk Like Trump; Tonight Show Do Not Play; Alex Rodriguez judges product ideas from the audience; Jade Bird performed "I Get No Joy"
| 1050 | April 17, 2019 | Kate Beckinsale, Ralph Macchio | Rudy Francisco |
Jimmy goes over the news stories in quick succession; Tonight Show Popular Mathematics; Tonight Show Can You Feel It? (Kate Beckinsale); Kate Beckinsale teaches Jimmy how to fake sneeze; Rudy Francisco performed "Rifle"
| 1051 | April 18, 2019 | Andy Cohen, Pete Davidson, Mario, Michael & Marco Andretti, José Andrés | N/A |
Monologue jokes have been redacted; audience members get vinyl copy of Honk; Jimmy performed "(I Can't Take No) More Redactions"
| 1052 | April 19, 2019 | Michael Shannon, Dr. Jane Goodall, Winnie Harlow | Jess Salomon |
Pete Buttigieg does a quick interview with Jimmy and criticizes his sketch of his candidacy announcement at the top of the program, as well as confirming a guest spot on May 13; Fake/Real Amazon.com Reviews; Tonight Show A Show of Hands; Thank You Notes; Winnie Harlow and Jimmy measure each other's arms
| 1053 | April 22, 2019 | Nathan Lane, Pitbull, Philippe Cousteau | Lenny Marcus |
Jimmy and the cast of Avengers: Endgame sing an A cappella version of "We Didn't Start the Fire"; Jimmy performed "Old Town Hall" as Bernie Sanders
| 1054 | April 23, 2019 | Dr. Phil, Sophia Bush, Tyler "Ninja" Blevins | Maggie Rogers |
Presidential Candidate Most Asked Questions; Jimmy recaps the news stories in the style of William Shakespeare in honor of his birthday; Dance Class Drop In (with Alex Rodriguez); Tyler "Ninja" Blevins and Jimmy play Super Smash Bros. Ultimate; Maggie Rogers performed "Say It"
| 1055 | April 24, 2019 | Brie Larson, Wyatt Cenac | Wu-Tang Clan |
Potential Donald Trump Punishments; Candidate Intervention; Student Quotes; Bryce Harper and Jimmy play MLB The Show 19; Brie Larson and Jimmy hula hoop; Brie Larson and Jimmy play Beat Saber; Wu-Tang Clan performed "Triumph"
| 1056 | April 25, 2019 | Paul Rudd, Diane Guerrero | Leonard Ouzts |
Joe Biden Presidential Campaign Merchandise; Joe Biden Presidential Campaign Slogans; Jay Leno subs in for Jimmy during the monologue; Tonight Show #hashtags: #ConcertFail; Paul Rudd and Jimmy appear in Dead or Alive's "You Spin Me Round (Like a Record)" music video; Diane Guerrero does musical impressions
| 1057 | April 26, 2019 | Sting, KJ Apa | Sting |
Wrong Presidential Candidate Photos; Thank You Notes; Two Stings on the Moon (Sting); Sting performed "Demolition Man"
| 1058 | April 29, 2019 | Kate McKinnon, Noah Centineo | Mac DeMarco |
Avengers: Endgame Records; Tonight Show Kentucky Derby Hat Giveaway; Tonight Show Hold My Gaze (Kate McKinnon); Tonight Show High School Dance Battle (Noah Centineo); Mac DeMarco performed "All of Our Yesterdays"
| 1059 | April 30, 2019 | Charlize Theron, Desus & Mero, Robert Irwin | N/A |
Tonight Show Royal Baby Watch; Tonight Show Kentucky Derby Hat Giveaway; Catchphrase (Charlize Theron & Jimmy Fallon Vs. Desus & Mero)

=== May ===
| No. | Original release date | Guest(s) | Musical/entertainment guest(s) |
|---|---|---|---|
| 1060 | May 1, 2019 | Alexander Skarsgård, Sebastian Stan | Fontaines D.C. |
Tonight Show Royal Baby Watch; Tonight Show Kentucky Derby Hat Giveaway; Tonight Show #hashtags: #MyBadLuck; Fontaines D.C. performed "Boys in the Better Land"
| 1061 | May 2, 2019 | Ryan Reynolds, Rosie Huntington-Whiteley | Protoje |
Jimmy covers the news stories in quick succession; Mexican Restaurants; Nudist Quotes; Piñata Fails; Tonight Show Kentucky Derby Hat Giveaway; Piggy Predictors: Kentucky Derby Edition; Spit Take Roulette (Ryan Reynolds); Rosie Huntington-Whiteley shows Jimmy how to wear and walk in a Kentucky Derby hat; Protoje performed "Like This"
| 1062 | May 6, 2019 | Will Smith, Laurie Metcalf | Phil Hanley |
Bill de Blasio Presidential Campaign Slogans; Beto O'Rourke Facebook Live Q&A; Will Smith performed "Friend Like Me"; Will Smith and Jimmy take a magic carpet ride
| 1063 | May 7, 2019 | Amy Poehler, Ryan Eggold | Vampire Weekend |
Audience made up of teachers in honor of Teacher Appreciation Day; Jeopardy! Categories; Joe Biden Vs. Donald Trump Voting Poll; Tonight Show Interesting Polls; Freestylin' with The Roots; Shouting Charades (Amy Poehler); Vampire Weekend performed "This Life"
| 1064 | May 8, 2019 | Maya Rudolph, Rita Ora | Kygo & Rita Ora |
Jimmy and The Roots performed a song to welcome the new royal baby; Tonight Show This Week in Memes; Tonight Show Build a Band (Maya Rudolph); Kygo & Rita Ora performed "Carry On"
| 1065 | May 9, 2019 | Halle Berry, Chris Kattan | Luke Combs |
Tariq is a fan of Pokémon; Tonight Show #hashtags: #MomQuotes; Sticky Balls (Halle Berry); Luke Combs performed "Beer Never Broke My Heart"
| 1066 | May 10, 2019 | Emma Thompson, Sophie Turner, Paula Pell, Amirah Kassem | N/A |
Mother's Day Cards; Tonight Show You Pick the Joke; Thank You Notes; Emma Thompson and Jimmy wash a sheepdog; Joe Jonas has a question for Sophie Turner; Paula Pell does her best comedy bits
| 1067 | May 13, 2019 | Milo Ventimiglia, Mayor Pete Buttigieg | Morrissey |
Slow Jam the News (with Mayor Pete Buttigieg); Tonight Show News & Improved; Morrissey performed "Morning Starship"
| 1068 | May 14, 2019 | Jeff Daniels, Jamie Foxx & Corinne Foxx | Maluma |
Tonight Show Name That Song Challenge (Jimmy Fallon Vs. Jamie Foxx & Corinne Foxx); Maluma performed "HP"
| 1069 | May 15, 2019 | Howard Stern | Of Monsters and Men |
Jimmy does Boston pickup lines; Jimmy Fallon, The Who & The Roots sing "Won't Get Fooled Again" with classroom instruments; Howard Stern performed "The Name Game"; Howard Stern invites one of his biggest fans onstage; Howard Stern and Jimmy live-cast from Times Square; Of Monsters and Men performed "Alligator"
| 1070 | May 16, 2019 | Jessica Alba, Yara Shahidi | The Head and the Heart |
Presidential Candidate or What Happens When You Google "Man"; Tonight Show #hashtags: #PromFail; Tonight Show Might Delete Later (Yara Shahidi); The Head and the Heart performed "Missed Connection"
| 1071 | May 17, 2019 | Gabrielle Union, DJ Khaled | Vampire Weekend |
Jimmy covers the news stories in quick succession; Congratulations The Big Bang Theory and Game of Thrones; Thank You Notes; Phone Booth (Gabrielle Union); Vampire Weekend "Jerusalem, New York, Berlin"
| 1072 | May 20, 2019 | John Lithgow, J Balvin | Sean Paul & J Balvin |
Tariq has not seen Game of Thrones; What Donald Trump Sees on the Teleprompter; Tonight Show Baby Memes; Massive continuity errors show up for no reason; Jimmy promotes Pepsi #SummerGram (with Chrissy Teigen); Sean Paul & J Balvin performed "Contra la Pared"
| 1073 | May 21, 2019 | Kevin Hart, Beanie Feldstein | Mabel |
Donald Trump Jr. Campaign Slogans; Tonight Show Polls; Tonight Show Hop Quiz (Kevin Hart); Mabel performed "Don't Call Me Up"
| 1074 | May 22, 2019 | Millie Bobby Brown, Jeff Ross, Richard Curtis | Lang Lang |
Jeopardy! Categories; Jeff Ross warms up for an upcoming comedy roast; Tonight Show Popular Mathematics; Millie Bobby Brown has a friend in the audience; Millie Bobby Brown impersonates Amy Winehouse; Tonight Show Beat Battle (Millie Bobby Brown); Richard Curtis and Jimmy try to remember Beatles songs; Lang Lang performed a medley of songs
| 1075 | May 23, 2019 | Harrison Ford, Richard Madden | Bazzi |
Service men and women in the audience; Fake/Real Amazon.com Reviews; Tonight Show Deep Issues, Deep Tissues; Thank You Notes; Harrison Ford comes out wearing a dog nose; Harrison Ford and Jimmy tell jokes; Richard Madden teaches Jimmy Scottish; Bazzi performed "Paradise"
| 1076 | May 24, 2019 | Dana Carvey, Emily Ratajkowski | Chloé Hilliard |
Tonight Show Goodnight News; Graduation Cards; Tonight Show A Show of Hands; Tonight Show Talk Like Trump; Legends (appearance by Dana Carvey, Robert Smigel); Dana Carvey does politician impressions; Jimmy congratulates Captain Kirk Douglas on his debut solo album under the name Hundred Watt Heart, Turbulent Times; Emily Ratajkowski brings her new puppy out

=== June ===
| No. | Original release date | Guest(s) | Musical/entertainment guest(s) |
|---|---|---|---|
| 1077 | June 10, 2019 | Shailene Woodley, Brian Tyree Henry | The National |
Shailene Woodley teaches Jimmy how to scream like Meryl Streep at the top of the program; The Roots wish Donald Duck a happy 85th birthday; Timothée Chalamet/Ventriloquist Dummy Quotes; Jimmy Fallon, Jonas Brothers & The Roots sing "Sucker" with classroom instruments; Catchphrase (Shailene Woodley & Jimmy Fallon Vs. Tariq & Brian Tyree Henry); The National performed "Oblivions"
| 1078 | June 11, 2019 | Selena Gomez, Elaine Welteroth | GoldLink featuring Maleek Berry |
Tonight Show Face Off: Drake Edition; Tonight Show This Week in Memes; Hot Ones (appearance by Sean Evans; Jimmy Fallon & Selena Gomez); GoldLink featuring Maleek Berry performed "Zulu Screams"
| 1079 | June 12, 2019 | Chris Hemsworth, Jonas Brothers | Jonas Brothers |
Tonight Show News & Improved; Tonight Show True Confessions (Chris Hemsworth, Kumail Nanjiani); Know Your Bro (Jonas Brothers); Jonas Brothers performed "Only Human"
| 1080 | June 13, 2019 | Sienna Miller, Josh Charles, Ryan Tedder | OneRepublic |
Tonight Show Interesting Polls; Tonight Show #hashtags: #DadQuotes; Josh Charles makes a Baltimore accent sexy; OneRepublic performed "Rescue Me"
| 1081 | June 14, 2019 | Stranger Things Cast, Ramy Youssef, Ivan Orkin | N/A |
Father's Day Cards; Tonight Show You Pick the Joke; Thank You Notes; Jimmy gives audience a puzzle based on one of his books; Stranger Things Cast performed the original song "Chicken Noodle Soup"; Tonight Show Search Party (Stranger Things Cast & Jimmy Fallon Vs. Stranger Things Cast & Tariq)
| 1082 | June 17, 2019 | Keegan-Michael Key, Horatio Sanz, Perry Farrell | Perry Farrell |
Political Polls; The This Guy Gets It Song (appearance by Horatio Sanz); Perry Farrell performed "Pirate Punk Politician"
| 1083 | June 18, 2019 | Willie Nelson, Adam DeVine | Willie Nelson |
Random Object Shootout: NBA Draft Edition (appearance by 2019 NBA Draft All-Stars); Tonight Show Wheel of Freestyle (Lin-Manuel Miranda); Adam DeVine performed "Torn"; Willie Nelson performed "My Favorite Picture of You"
| 1084 | June 19, 2019 | Michael Strahan, Nikki & Brie Bella | Sleater-Kinney |
Political Figure Tweets; Tonight Show Do Not Play; Charades (Jimmy Fallon & Michael Strahan Vs. Nikki & Brie Bella); Sleater-Kinney performed "Hurry On Home"
| 1085 | June 20, 2019 | Madonna, Guy Raz | Ari Lennox |
Tonight Show #hashtags: #WeddingFail; Tonight Show Neon Dance Battle (Madonna); Madonna teaches Jimmy the cha-cha-cha; Ari Lennox performed "Up Late/BMO"
| 1086 | June 24, 2019 | Chrissy Teigen, Bashir Salahuddin & Diallo Riddle | Aldous Harding |
Reggie; Tonight Show Can You Feel It? (Chrissy Teigen); Aldous Harding performed "The Barrel"
| 1087 | June 25, 2019 | Trevor Noah, Sebastian Maniscalco | Penn & Teller |
Tariq loves what he already has; Nicki Minaj makes a surprise appearance; Tonight Show Polls; Tonight Show Wheel of Political Impressions (Trevor Noah)
| 1088 | June 26, 2019 | Daisy Ridley, Colin Quinn | Little Big Town |
Live broadcast; 2020 Democratic Presidential Candidates!; News Smash; Jimmy performed a song about memes; Madame Tussauds Stranger Things Surprise (Stranger Things Cast); Daisy Ridley raps "Lady Marmalade"; Daisy Ridley and Jimmy pour pints of beers; Little Big Town performed "The Daughters"
| 1089 | June 27, 2019 | Nicki Minaj, Phoebe Robinson | Julia Michaels |
Jimmy impersonates presidential candidates at the top of the program; live broadcast; Tariq raps a Democratic presidential debate recap; Jimmy and Nicki Minaj Go to Red Lobster; Tonight Show Wheel of Freestyle (Nicki Minaj); Phoebe Robinson goes on a crying trip; Julia Michaels performed "Hurt Again"

=== July ===
| No. | Original release date | Guest(s) | Musical/entertainment guest(s) |
|---|---|---|---|
| 1090 | July 15, 2019 | Jesse Eisenberg, Fran Lebowitz | Denzel Curry |
Stephen Colbert makes an appearance at the top of the program (Stephen Colbert and Jimmy performed "The NeverEnding Story"); Fake/Real Amazon.com Reviews; Tonight Show Drop It In; Tonight Show Do Not Read; Jimmy shows Jesse Eisenberg a limited edition action figure based on his character from The Art of Self-Defense; Denzel Curry performed "Ricky/Wish"
| 1091 | July 16, 2019 | Chance the Rapper, David Crosby & Cameron Crowe | David Crosby |
The Tonight Show Carolers; Jimmy makes a surprise call to Jennifer Lopez (first look at footage from Hustlers); Chance the Rapper debuts information about his debut studio album; Box of Lies (Chance the Rapper); David Crosby performed "Long Time Gone"
| 1092 | July 17, 2019 | Joel McHale, Marc Maron, Blake Griffin | Dusty Slay |
The Roots give tips on how to beat the heat; Face App Filter Results; Tonight Show This Week in Memes; Blake Griffin shows Jimmy how athletes look stupid
| 1093 | July 18, 2019 | Kenan Thompson, Joe Manganiello | Robyn |
Tonight Show You Pick the Joke; Tonight Show Mad Lib Theater (Kenan Thompson, Joe Manganiello); Robyn performed "Between the Lines/Love Is Free"
| 1094 | July 22, 2019 | David Spade, Jeff Foxworthy | Red Hearse |
Tariq's segment gets cut, performed "Memory"; Tonight Show Wheel of Opinions (David Spade); Red Hearse performed "Half Love"
| 1095 | July 23, 2019 | Octavia Spencer, Fred Armisen | YBN Cordae featuring Anderson .Paak |
Boris Johnson Looks Like Donald Trump; Jimmy purchased a Timothée Chalamet ventriloquist puppet; Tonight Show Build a Band (Fred Armisen); YBN Cordae featuring Anderson .Paak performed "RNP"
| 1096 | July 24, 2019 | Naomi Watts, Mike Birbiglia | Midland |
Steve Higgins puts Jimmy under a mock testimony for a monologue joke; Jimmy and The Roots celebrate National Tequila Day; Tonight Show Whisper Challenge (Naomi Watts); Mike Birbiglia and Jimmy take shots of tequila; Midland performed "Mr. Lonely"
| 1097 | July 25, 2019 | Kevin Delaney, Zachary Quinto, Betty Gilpin | Mike Vecchione |
Political Poll; Tonight Show Interesting Polls; Zachary Quinto plays the banjo
| 1098 | July 29, 2019 | Rachel Brosnahan, Carla Gugino, Fortnite World Cup Solo Champion | Ty Dolla $ign |
Tariq likes Eric Swalwell; Steve Higgins gets a robo call; 7 Seconds (Rachel Brosnahan); Ty Dolla $ign performed "Purple Emoji/Hottest in the City"
| 1099 | July 30, 2019 | Kevin Bacon, Queer Eye's Fab Five | The Highwomen |
Mark Kelley recaps the Democratic presidential candidates; First Drafts of Rock (Kevin Bacon); The Highwomen performed "Redesigning Women"
| 1100 | July 31, 2019 | Dwayne Johnson, Issa Rae | Eddy Grant |
Marianne Williamson or Dumbledore; Tariq has a list of things that annoy him; Queer Eye's Fab Five and Jimmy ride The Beast speedboat; Jimmy tries to find out cameos in Fast & Furious Presents: Hobbs & Shaw; Eddy Grant performed "Electric Avenue"

=== August ===
| No. | Original release date | Guest(s) | Musical/entertainment guest(s) |
|---|---|---|---|
| 1101 | August 1, 2019 | Hasan Minhaj, Vanessa Kirby | Sam Fender |
YouTube/Textbook Definitions; Jimmy debuts Box of Lies home game; Thank You Notes; Tonight Show Story Time (Hasan Minhaj); Vanessa Kirby shows Jimmy a fighting move; Sam Fender performed "Will We Talk?"
| 1102 | August 5, 2019 | Julianne Moore, Jacob Tremblay | Julio Torres |
Jimmy addresses the 2019 El Paso and Dayton mass shootings at the top of the program; Burger King Slogans; Tariq calls Jimmy during the program; The Law Offices of Moore & Fallon (Julianne Moore)
| 1103 | August 6, 2019 | Dakota Johnson, Post Malone, Jon Lovitz | Tyler Childers |
Steve Higgins mistakes jokes for reality, doesn't know about the stock market; US Congress Quotes; Beer Pong (Post Malone); Post Malone and Jimmy performed "Seven Drunken Nights"; Jon Lovitz does layered impressions; Jon Lovitz brings out his dog; Tyler Childers performed "House Fire"
| 1104 | August 7, 2019 | Greg Kinnear, Phoebe Waller-Bridge | Big Sean |
Political Poll; The Fast and the Furious Sequels; Tariq left for vacation; Freestylin' with The Roots; Tonight Show Think Fast! (Phoebe Waller-Bridge); Big Sean performed "Single Again"
| 1105 | August 8, 2019 | Ron Burgundy, Lil Rel Howery | Natalie Merchant |
Ron Burgundy does stand-up comedy; Tonight Show #hashtags: #CarFails; Natalie Merchant performed "These Are Days"
| 1106 | August 12, 2019 | Common, Kate Upton, Arantza Peña Popo | Common featuring Swizz Beatz |
Something You Didn't Expect to Hear Today; 80's Aerobics Dance Challenge (Kate Upton); Tonight Show Wheel of Freestyle (Common, Ray Wimbley); Jimmy announces the Doodle for Google contest winner; Common featuring Swizz Beatz performed "Hercules"
| 1107 | August 13, 2019 | Henry Golding, Jonathan Groff | Rick Ross featuring Swizz Beatz |
Tariq couldn't think of a better monologue joke; Steve Higgins' birthday; debut of Last Christmas trailer; Henry Golding and Jimmy performed "Sexual Healing"; Henry Golding and Jimmy give audience members haircuts; Jonathan Groff makes a voicemail for Jimmy's children; Rick Ross featuring Swizz Beatz performed "BIG TYME"
| 1108 | August 14, 2019 | Ice Cube, Kieran Culkin, Alessia Cara | Juanes & Alessia Cara |
Who Is John Hickenlooper?; Candidate Check In; Tonight Show News & Improved; Ice Cube performed the Big3 theme song; Alessia Cara and Jimmy do a comedy bit; Tonight Show Wheel of Impressions (Alessia Cara); Juanes & Alessia Cara performed "Querer Mejor"
| 1109 | August 15, 2019 | John Travolta, Marlon Wayans, Mary Beth Keane | Caroline Jones |
Tariq knows how a monologue joke is going to go (Trump's Summer Reading List); Tonight Show John Travolt/Off (John Travolta); John Travolta teaches Jimmy the tango; Caroline Jones performed "Tough Guys"

=== September ===
| No. | Original release date | Guest(s) | Musical/entertainment guest(s) |
|---|---|---|---|
| 1110 | September 3, 2019 | Bill Hader, Cara Delevingne, Lester Holt | Alec Benjamin |
Donald Trump Tweets; Jimmy goes on too long with jokes; Tonight Show Drop It In; Jimmy, Bill Hader and Cara Delevingne tell scary stories; Cara Delevingne plays guitar behind her head; Alec Benjamin performed "Jesus in LA"
| 1111 | September 4, 2019 | Orlando Bloom, Constance Wu, Jack White & Brendan Benson | The Raconteurs |
Jimmy tries to explain the purpose of a tweet to Orlando Bloom at the top of the program; Mitch McConnell Nicknames; Tariq is excited for a Hulu miniseries (appearance by Constance Wu); Water War (Orlando Bloom); The Raconteurs performed "Only Child"
| 1112 | September 5, 2019 | Kendall Jenner, Desus & Mero | Tanya Tucker featuring Brandi Carlile |
Tonight Show Get to Know the Voter; Tonight Show Pour It Out (Kendall Jenner); Kendall Jenner teaches Jimmy a cheer; Tanya Tucker featuring Brandi Carlile performed "The Wheels of Laredo"
| 1113 | September 6, 2019 | Ryan Seacrest, Robin Thede | Derren Brown |
Tonight Show Talk Like Trump; Thank You Notes; Robin Thede reads jokes from her 2011 writing packet to write for Late Night with Jimmy Fallon
| 1114 | September 8, 2019 | Michael B. Jordan & Jamie Foxx, Kelly Clarkson | Kane Brown |
Tariq Lightly Roasts the NFL Mascots; Tonight Show Superlatives; Jimmy & Post Malone Go to Medieval Times; Tonight Show Beat Battle (Kelly Clarkson); Kane Brown performed "Homesick"
| 1115 | September 9, 2019 | Ashton Kutcher, Billie Lourd, Bianca Andreescu | Sheryl Crow featuring Jason Isbell |
Political Poll; Tonight Show This Week in Memes; Ashton Kutcher and Jimmy have a cow-milking contest; Billie Lourd and Jimmy performed "Africa"; Bianca Andreescu teaches Jimmy a rapid flip; Sheryl Crow featuring Jason Isbell performed "Everything Is Broken"
| 1116 | September 10, 2019 | Jennifer Lopez, Russell Westbrook | Ryan Hamilton |
The History of Music Video Dancing (Jennifer Lopez); Russell Westbrook shows Jimmy how to do seated dancing
| 1117 | September 11, 2019 | Kim Kardashian West, Winnie Harlow | Iggy Pop |
Everyone knows who all the presidential candidates are except Jimmy; Jimmy gives a cue card to a plant character that was in the sketch previous; Tonight Show #Blessed #Inspired; Tonight Show Show Me Your Phone (Kim Kardashian West, Winnie Harlow); Iggy Pop performed "James Bond"
| 1118 | September 12, 2019 | Jennifer Garner, Jim Jefferies | Megan Thee Stallion featuring Ty Dolla $ign & DaBaby |
Steve Higgins learns some alarming things about Hustlers; Thank You Notes; Secret Ingredient (Jennifer Garner, Jim Jefferies); Megan Thee Stallion featuring Ty Dolla $ign & DaBaby performed "Hot Girl Summer/Cash Shit"
| 1119 | September 16, 2019 | Senator Kamala Harris, Lilly Singh, Charli XCX | Charli XCX featuring Christine and the Queens |
College students sit in the audience; Slow Jam the News (Senator Kamala Harris); audience members ask Senator Kamala Harris questions; Thank You Notes (Lilly Singh); Eric Ripert makes a meal for college students; Charli XCX featuring Christine and the Queens performed "Gone"
| 1120 | September 17, 2019 | Sarah Paulson, Michelle Dockery | The Lumineers |
GE Tonight Show Fallonventions: Kid's Inventions; Tonight Show How Dare You (Michelle Dockery); The Lumineers performed "Life in the City"
| 1121 | September 18, 2019 | Nick Kroll, Dennis Miller, Tyler "Ninja" Blevins | Residente featuring Bad Bunny |
Tonight Show Wheel of Impressions (Nick Kroll); Residente featuring Bad Bunny performed "Bellacoso"
| 1122 | September 19, 2019 | Sylvester Stallone, Cedric the Entertainer | Mark Normand |
Courtesy of the Gentleman at the Bar (Brad Pitt); Jimmy's birthday; Thank You Notes
| 1123 | September 20, 2019 | Paul Giamatti, Chrissy Metz | Sheryl Crow featuring Chris Stapleton |
Jimmy keeps Tariq's pong record going at the top of the program; Tonight Show #hashtags: #FallSongs; Sheryl Crow featuring Chris Stapleton performed "Tell Me When It's Over"
| 1124 | September 23, 2019 | Gwen Stefani, Ben Platt | Zac Brown Band |
Live broadcasts for the week; Rudy Giuliani Isn't Helping; "Hot Girl Fall" (appearance by Megan Thee Stallion); Ben Platt & Gwen Stefani come out early ("Out of the Business"); Gwen Stefani invites the audience to her Las Vegas concert residency; Zac Brown Band performed "The Woods"
| 1125 | September 24, 2019 | Demi Moore, Justin Hartley | Mark Ronson featuring Yebba |
Jimmy appears as Donald Trump at the top of the program; Tonight Show In Other News; Jimmy Fallon, Ringo Starr & The Roots sing "Yellow Submarine" with classroom instruments; The Law Offices of Moore, Hartley, Ronson & Fallon (Demi Moore, Justin Hartley, Mark Ronson); Mark Ronson featuring Yebba performed "Don't Leave Me Lonely"
| 1126 | September 25, 2019 | Robert De Niro, Jameela Jamil | Bastille |
Thank You Notes; Charli XCX and Jimmy performed "Just Can't Get Enough/I Love It"; debut of The Irishman official trailer; Jameela Jamil has hidden snacks; Bastille performed "Bad Decisions"
| 1127 | September 26, 2019 | Michael Che & Colin Jost, Dove Cameron, Robert Irwin | Carole King |
Jimmy appears as Donald Trump at the top of the program; Tonight Show Joke Off (Michael Che & Colin Jost); Night of Gamesmanship (appearance by Jack White); Carole King performed "It's Too Late"
| 1128 | September 27, 2019 | Billie Eilish, Sebastian Maniscalco | Sebastian Maniscalco |
TNN; Donald Trump Impeachment Poll; Tonight Show True Confessions (Billie Eilish, Colin Quinn); Billie Eilish has sprained both ankles
| 1129 | September 30, 2019 | James Spader, Ruby Rose, Elvis Duran | DaBaby |
Steve Higgins has a broken iPad; Jimmy congratulates The Roots on the vinyl box set 20th anniversary re-release of Things Fall Apart; Jimmy announces his new children's book; Jimmy has The Roots sign a copy of the album for James Spader; Elvis Duran reads a passage from his new book; DaBaby performed a medley of songs

=== October ===
| No. | Original release date | Guest(s) | Musical/entertainment guest(s) |
|---|---|---|---|
| 1130 | October 1, 2019 | Lin-Manuel Miranda, Chris Colfer | The Cast of Freestyle Love Supreme |
Tariq's Irk List; The Cast of Freestyle Love Supreme performed "Tonight Show Pet Peeves"
| 1131 | October 2, 2019 | Natalie Portman, Henry Winkler | Robbie Robertson |
Tonight Show Go On, Git!; Jimmy reenacts Jon Hamm dancing; Tonight Show Mad Lib Theater (Natalie Portman); Robbie Robertson performed "Let Love Reign"
| 1132 | October 3, 2019 | Taylor Swift, Chris O'Dowd | Angel Olsen |
Jimmy appears as Donald Trump at the top of the program; Tonight Show You Pick the Joke; Thank You Notes; Tonight Show Name That Song Challenge (Taylor Swift); Angel Olsen performed "All Mirrors"
| 1133 | October 4, 2019 | Joaquin Phoenix, Zoey Deutch | N/A |
Zoey Deutch makes an appearance after the monologue; Tonight Show #hashtags: #CollegeInSixWords
| 1134 | October 6, 2019 | Edward Norton, Alessia Cara | Alessia Cara |
Jimmy speaks to NFL players; Jimmy golfs with Tiger Woods; ad for Jimmy's new children's book; Live Mashup: "Stayin' Alive/Stay" (appearance by Alessia Cara); Alessia Cara performed "Rooting for You"
| 1135 | October 7, 2019 | Lupita Nyong'o, Dane Cook, Jay "sinatraa" Won & Matthew "Super" DeLisi | The Avett Brothers |
Tonight Show Picture This; Lupita Nyong'o raps; Tonight Show Emotional Interview (Lupita Nyong'o); The Avett Brothers performed "Tell the Truth"
| 1136 | October 8, 2019 | Clive Owen, Elsie Fisher | Lewis Capaldi |
Republican Excuse Generator; Jimmy gives audience members a copy of his new children's book; Tonight Show Audience Suggestion Box (Ghost of Rockefeller Center, Trace Adkins & The Breaking Bad Choir performed the Breaking Bad theme with lyrics, 2019's Hottest Halloween Costumes, DJ 8 1/2 X 11); Jimmy brings out the Timothée Chalamet puppet; Lewis Capaldi performed "Someone You Loved"
| 1137 | October 9, 2019 | Jesse Eisenberg, Hailee Steinfeld | Steve Miller |
Steve Miller performed "Fly Like an Eagle"
| 1138 | October 10, 2019 | Priyanka Chopra Jonas, Questlove & Tariq | Rex Orange County |
YouTube Vs. Textbooks; Hot Ones (appearance by Sean Evans, Jimmy Fallon & Priyanka Chopra Jonas); Know Your Roots (Questlove & Tariq); Rex Orange County performed "10/10"
| 1139 | October 20, 2019 | Alec Baldwin, Kate Beckinsale | Young Thug featuring Gunna |
Tonight Show Superlatives; New Jersey Devil pies Jimmy in the face; Tonight Show Cooler Heads (Kate Beckinsale, Alec Baldwin); Young Thug featuring Gunna performed "Hot"
| 1140 | October 21, 2019 | Scarlett Johansson, Mayor Pete Buttigieg | Jim James, Teddy Abrams & Louisville Orchestra |
Tariq does a Mitt Romney theme song; Tonight Show This Week in Memes; Tonight Show True Confessions (Scarlett Johansson, Mayor Pete Buttigieg); Jim James, Teddy Abrams & Louisville Orchestra performed "Back to the End of the World"
| 1141 | October 22, 2019 | Jessica Biel, Billy Crudup | Jay Jurden |
Political Poll; Updated Painting Names; JJB Autos Commercial (Jessica Biel, Billy Crudup); Tonight Show Do Not Play
| 1142 | October 23, 2019 | Michael Douglas, Kathryn Hahn | Jenny Lewis |
The Lucas Bros.; Hillary Clinton Is Lurking; Jimmy pays tribute to a closing pizza store; Tonight Show #hashtags: #MyWorstCostume; Kathryn Hahn performed "Truth Hurts"; Jenny Lewis performed "Rabbit Hole"
| 1143 | October 24, 2019 | Keegan-Michael Key, Chance the Rapper, Brockhampton | Brockhampton |
Tonight Show In Other News; Thank You Notes; Tonight Show Wheel of Musical Impressions (Keegan-Michael Key); Brockhampton performed "Sugar"
| 1144 | October 27, 2019 | John Cena, Luke Bryan | Luke Bryan |
Tonight Show Superlatives; announcement of The Tonight Show taping at the University of Texas at Austin on November 7; Fish Slap (John Cena); John Cena and Jimmy recreate walking out to bagpipes from Cena's college football days; Luke Bryan performed "What She Wants Tonight"
| 1145 | October 28, 2019 | Emma Thompson, Joel Kinnaman | Liam Gallagher |
Tonight Show Go On, Git!; Tonight Show Random Instrument Challenge (Emma Thompson); Liam Gallagher performed "Once"
| 1146 | October 29, 2019 | Reese Witherspoon, Rhett & Link, Chef Daniel Humm | N/A |
A character performed an original song; Tonight Show Can You Feel It? (Reese Witherspoon); Rhett & Link and Jimmy eat Popeyes chicken sandwich; Jimmy reads his own blurb on Rhett & Link's book, and they pitch their own blurb for Jimmy's children's book; Rhett & Link performed an original song; The Ultimate Minute Meal (Chef Daniel Humm)
| 1147 | October 30, 2019 | Emilia Clarke, Bobby Cannavale, Booker T. Jones | FKA twigs |
Coastguard Personnel Quotes; Tonight Show Box of Lies (Emilia Clarke); Bobby Cannavale and Jimmy impersonate Bruce Springsteen; FKA twigs performed "Cellophane"
| 1148 | October 31, 2019 | Kristen Stewart, Gaten Matarazzo | Pete Lee |
Everyone talks about their biggest fears; Thank You Notes; Tonight Show Virtual Reality Pictionary (Kristen Stewart & Jimmy Fallon Vs. Tariq & Gaten Matarazzo); Gaten Matarazzo and Jimmy performed "The NeverEnding Story"

=== November ===
| No. | Original release date | Guest(s) | Musical/entertainment guest(s) |
|---|---|---|---|
| 1149 | November 4, 2019 | Chris Evans, Naomi Scott | EarthGang |
Possible Jobs for Beto O'Rourke; Know Your Bro (Chris & Scott Evans); EarthGang performed "This Side/Bank"
| 1150 | November 5, 2019 | Adam Sandler, Jenny Slate | Megan Gailey |
Tonight Show Talk Like Trump; Spooky Spider; Tonight Show You Pick the Joke; Tonight Show News & Improved
| 1151 | November 6, 2019 | Henry Golding, Noomi Rapace | Dan White |
Hot Sax; Tonight Show Picture This; Noomi Rapace has Jimmy wear a wig and takes a Polaroid photo
| 1152 | November 7, 2019 | Matthew McConaughey, Chip & Joanna Gaines | Gucci Mane |
Taping at the University of Texas at Austin; musical number opening at the top of the program ("Thank God I'm a Country Boy"); Jimmy brings three audience members from the opening onstage and gives them a Samsung holiday bundle; Matthew McConaughey takes a selfie with Jimmy and the audience; Jimmy takes Matthew McConaughey's film class at the University of Texas at Austin; Jimmy performed "The Eyes of Texas"; Chip Gaines gives Jimmy a Baylor University hat; Chip Gaines teaches Jimmy the two-step; Gucci Mane performed a trap music version of "The Eyes of Texas"; Gucci Mane performed "Move Me"
| 1153 | November 11, 2019 | Michael Shannon, Jenna Bush Hager & Barbara Pierce Bush | Pete Yorn |
Jimmy welcomes three Medal of Honor recipients at the top of the program; veterans and their families sit in the audience; Civilian Medals; Jimmy shows his People's Choice Award; The Tonight Show donates $150,000 to the Fisher House Foundation; Jimmy announces the winner of The Home Depot Foundation contest Operation Surprise; Tonight Show Go On, Git!; Michael Shannon brings Jimmy an Alvin and the Chipmunks onesie; Michael Shannon acknowledges two veterans; Michael Shannon and Jimmy wrestle; Jimmy acknowledges the passing of Rick Ludwin; Pete Yorn performed "Calm Down"
| 1154 | November 12, 2019 | Kristen Bell, Judd Apatow | Danny Brown |
Streaming Services Ad; What NASCAR Stands For (appearance by the NASCAR Championship Four); The History of Disney Songs (with Kristen Bell); Judd Apatow reads from It's Garry Shandling's Book; Judd Apatow has Jimmy read a note from the NBC censor about Freaks and Geeks; Danny Brown performed "Best Life"
| 1155 | November 13, 2019 | Rachel Maddow, Tony Hale | Dominic Fike |
Jimmy appears as Donald Trump at the top of the program (Impeachment After Dark Live!, appearance by Tony Hale); Tonight Show Polls; Dominic Fike performed "Phone Numbers"
| 1156 | November 14, 2019 | Alex Rodriguez, Lili Reinhart | Ian Lara |
Obscure Disney Films; Thank You Notes; Thursday Night Baseball (Alex Rodriguez); Jimmy reads Lili Reinhart's drunk tweets
| 1157 | November 15, 2019 | Celine Dion, Tig Notaro, Colin O'Brady | Shin Lim |
Tonight Show #hashtags: #ThatWasCold; Celine Dion and Jimmy take a selfie; Colin O'Brady announces his next expedition; Jimmy gives Colin O'Brady a tiny cutout of Drake
| 1158 | November 18, 2019 | Seth Meyers, Cobie Smulders | Tones and I |
News Smash; Presidential Schedule; Roger Stone Court File; Tonight Show Talk Like Trump; Tonight Show Think Fast! (Seth Meyers); Tones and I performed "Dance Monkey"
| 1159 | November 19, 2019 | Chadwick Boseman, Evan Rachel Wood, David Byrne | David Byrne's American Utopia |
Jimmy appears as Donald Trump at the top of the program (Impeachment After Dark Live!); C-SPAN Schedule; Impeachment Hearings Are Better Out of Context; Farting on TV Series; Hashtag the Panda makes an appearance; Freestylin' with The Roots; David Byrne teaches Jimmy dance moves; David Byrne's American Utopia performed "Road to Nowhere"
| 1160 | November 20, 2019 | Dolly Parton, Kacey Musgraves | Kacey Musgraves |
Tonight Show Impeachment Trivia; Jeopardy! Worst of All Time; Tonight Show #hashtags: #AddAWordRuinASong; Jimmy smells Dolly Parton; Dolly Parton and Jimmy performed "9 to 5"; Dolly Parton reads Jimmy's palms; Kasey Musgraves performed "Glittery"
| 1161 | November 21, 2019 | Will Ferrell, Alan Cumming | Jessica Kirson |
Jimmy and The Roots are tired of the presidential race; Tonight Show News & Improved; Tonight Show Whisper Challenge (Will Ferrell); Alan Cumming performed "Tomorrow"
| 1162 | November 22, 2019 | John Legend, M. Night Shyamalan | John Legend |
Rejected Trump Font Names; Amazon.com Delivery; John Legend Presents: Sexiest Elf Alive (John Legend); John Legend performed "This Christmas"
| 1163 | November 25, 2019 | Daisy Ridley, Tom Hiddleston, Michael Eric Dyson | Noah Cyrus featuring Leon Bridges |
The Lucas Bros.; Tonight Show Tariq's Irk List; Star Wars Film Rap Recap (Daisy Ridley); Tom Hiddleston cries on command; Noah Cyrus featuring Leon Bridges performed "July"
| 1164 | November 26, 2019 | Senator Bernie Sanders, Katherine Langford, Gary Vaynerchuk | N/A |
I'm Going to Tell My Kids Memes; Slow Jam the News (Bernie Sanders); Free Throw Challenge (Bernie Sanders)
| 1165 | November 27, 2019 | John Boyega, Abigail Spencer | JP Saxe featuring Julia Michaels |
Donald Trump Instagram Posts; Tonight Show #hashtags: #TurkeyDayTraditions; Tonight Show Things You Won't Hear in Star Wars! (John Boyega); JP Saxe featuring Julia Michaels performed "If the World Was Ending"
| 1166 | November 28, 2019 | Tracy Morgan, Brian Regan | Jason Aldean |
Stores' Black Friday Slogans; Jason Aldean and Jimmy performed "At My Hometown Bar on the Night Before Thanksgiving"; Thank You Notes; EatsTV Cooking Tips (Tracy Morgan); Jason Aldean performed "We Back"

=== December ===
| No. | Original release date | Guest(s) | Musical/entertainment guest(s) |
|---|---|---|---|
| 1167 | December 1, 2019 | Tiffany Haddish, Lakeith Stanfield | The Free Nationals featuring Anderson .Paak |
Classic Meme Quotes; Tonight Show Superlatives; Jimmy performed "Holdin' Out for One More Turkey Sandwich"; The Football Party Patrol (appearance by Luke Bryan); Tonight Show Story Time (Tiffany Haddish); Tiffany Haddish performed "Hava Nagila"; The Free Nationals featuring Anderson .Paak performed "Gidget"
| 1168 | December 2, 2019 | John Mulaney, Karlie Kloss | Solange |
Fake Vs. Real Amazon.com Reviews; Tariq orders a panini maker for Cyber Monday; Donald Trump Quotes; Tonight Show Go On, Git!; Tonight Show Wheel of Opinions: Holiday Edition (John Mulaney); Karlie Kloss judges Jimmy's fashion choices; Solange performed a medley of songs
| 1169 | December 3, 2019 | Felicity Jones, Tomi Adeyemi, Kevin Delaney | Burna Boy |
World Leader Inner Thoughts; Tonight Show 12 Days of Christmas Sweaters; Burna Boy performed "Collateral Damage/Anybody"
| 1170 | December 4, 2019 | Senator Elizabeth Warren, Alanis Morissette | Alanis Morissette |
Jimmy appears as Donald Trump at the top of the program (Impeachment After Dark Live!: UK Edition); News Smash; Tonight Show 12 Days of Christmas Sweaters; Jimmy and Alanis Morissette perform in disguise on the New York subway; Curveball (Elizabeth Warren); Alanis Morissette performed "Reasons I Drink"
| 1171 | December 5, 2019 | Jennifer Lopez, Camila Cabello | Camila Cabello |
Peloton Statement; Jimmy gives the audience members a pair of glasses; Tonight Show 12 Days of Christmas Sweaters; Camila Cabello gives the audience members tickets to The Romance Tour; Tonight Show Google Translate Songs (Camila Cabello); Camila Cabello performed "Living Proof"
| 1172 | December 9, 2019 | Timothée Chalamet, Ashley Graham, Bong Joon-ho | Summer Walker |
The Trump Toilet Commercial; Scandalous Trump Evidence; Tonight Show Polls; Tonight Show 12 Days of Christmas Sweaters; Timothée Chalamet juggles; Summer Walker performed "Playing Games"
| 1173 | December 10, 2019 | Hasan Minhaj, Charlie Puth | Charlie Puth |
Democrat Inner Thoughts; Russian Olympic Events; Modern Miracles; Tonight Show 12 Days of Christmas Sweaters; Tonight Show Audience Suggestion Box (The Starbucks Carolers, actors playing Robert De Niro, Paul McCartney and a Minion performed "The Cupid Shuffle", Christmas tree lighting tutorial, The Rockettes make an appearance); Hasan Minhaj reveals what he would ban if he was running for US President; Tonight Show Musical Challenge (Charlie Puth); Charlie Puth performed "Mother"
| 1174 | December 11, 2019 | Jon Hamm, Keri Russell | Gary Clark Jr. |
News Smash; Tonight Show 12 Days of Christmas Sweaters; Tonight Show Mad Lib Theater (Jon Hamm, Keri Russell); Instant Impressions (Keri Russell); Gary Clark Jr. performed "This Land"
| 1175 | December 12, 2019 | Ryan Reynolds, Niall Horan | Camila Cabello featuring DaBaby |
Politician Christmas Cards; Steve Higgins is thinking about seeing a film this weekend; Tonight Show 12 Days of Christmas Sweaters; Tonight Show True Confessions (Ryan Reynolds, Camila Cabello); Niall Horan reads "A Visit from St. Nicholas" in different accents; Camila Cabello featuring DaBaby performed "My Oh My"
| 1176 | December 16, 2019 | Michael B. Jordan, Sam Heughan | Lea Michele featuring Jonathan Groff |
Biden's Millennial Slogans; Laurna Gibbs; Tonight Show 12 Days of Christmas Sweaters; Lea Michele & Jonathan Groff come out early ("Out of the Business"); Michael B. Jordan brings Jimmy a rum cupcake; Lea Michele featuring Jonathan Groff performed "I'll Be Home for Christmas"
| 1177 | December 17, 2019 | John Lithgow, Liam Payne | Liam Payne |
Jimmy as Donald Trump meets Santa Claus at the top of the program; Tonight Show 12 Days of Christmas Sweaters; Tonight Show Name That Song Challenge (Liam Payne); John Lithgow brings Jimmy a handmade Christmas card; Liam Payne performed "Live Forever"
| 1178 | December 18, 2019 | Paul Reiser & Helen Hunt, Dua Lipa | James Blake |
News Smash; Jimmy will not open a present from the warm-up comic; Tonight Show 12 Days of Christmas Sweaters; New Holiday Yankee Candle Commercial (appearance by Ryan Reynolds); Jimmy gives the comic's present to the sweater winner for her birthday; Jimmy Fallon, the cast of Cats & The Roots sing "Memory" with classroom instruments; James Blake performed "I'll Come Too"
| 1179 | December 19, 2019 | Kate McKinnon, Noah Baumbach | Dua Lipa |
Impeachment Ballots; Donald Trump Christmas Card w/ Note to Democrats; Cliff; Tonight Show You Pick the Joke; Tonight Show 12 Days of Christmas Sweaters; Elmo takes Jimmy and Tariq to Sesame Street; Tonight Show Dramatic Turn & Read (Kate McKinnon); Dua Lipa performed "Don't Start Now"
| 1180 | December 20, 2019 | Eddie Murphy, Greta Gerwig | Orlando Leyba |
Eddie Murphy Films Compared to Donald Trump's Situation; Politician New Year's Resolutions; Tonight Show 12 Days of Christmas Sweaters; Thank You Notes
