= List of The Tonight Show Starring Jimmy Fallon episodes (2023) =

- No. of episodes: 129

Release
- Original network: NBC
- Original release: January 3 – December 22, 2023

Season chronology
- ← Previous; 2022 episodes Next → 2024 episodes

This is the list of episodes for The Tonight Show Starring Jimmy Fallon in 2023. Production was ceased from May 2 to October 2 due to the 2023 Writers Guild of America strike amid the 2023 Hollywood labor disputes.

== 2023 ==
=== January ===
No.	Original release date	Guest(s)	Musical/entertainment guest(s)
1769	January 3, 2023	Ana de Armas, Luke Grimes	Protoje
New Year Survey; Southwest Airlines Fan Zone; Tonight Show WeTweet; Jimmy acknowledges the passing of Barbara Walters; Ana de Armas and Jimmy have ice cream; Tonight Show Three–Word Movie (Ana de Armas); Line or Lyric: Yellowstone Edition (Luke Grimes); Protoje performed "HILLS"
1770	January 4, 2023	Winston Duke, Darren Aronofsky, Emma Myers	Idles
Kevin McCarthy Speaker of the United States House of Representatives Slogans; No Rules!!!; Planet Fitness Ad; the crew discuss their New Years' resolutions; Tonight Show Battle of the Instant Songwriters; Winston Duke breaks an apple in half; Winston Duke teaches Jimmy a chant; Idles performed "The Wheel"
1771	January 5, 2023	Savannah Guthrie & Hoda Kotb, Colin Quinn	Madison Cunningham
Steve Higgins pronounces politician names; Joe Biden Quotes; Classic Movies If They Were Underwater; Social Media Sickness Tips; Tiny Song; Tonight Show #hashtags: #ThreeWordResolution; Tonight Show What's Up, Dog?; Madison Cunningham performed "Life According to Raechel"
1772	January 6, 2023	Allison Williams, Jerrod Carmichael	Jessie Reyez
The crew argue over a monologue joke; Bed Bath & Beyond Statement; the crew discuss Facebook memories; Thank You Notes; M3GAN is in the audience; Tonight Show Singing Whisper Challenge (Allison Williams); Jessie Reyez performed "STILL C U"
1773	January 9, 2023	Al Pacino & Logan Lerman, Rupert Grint	Dry Cleaning
Say What?!!!; Tonight Show News & Improved; Tonight Show WeTweet; Dry Cleaning performed "Hot Penny Day"
1774	January 10, 2023	Leslie Jones, Giancarlo Esposito	Alvvays
Tonight Show News Smash; M3GAN Sequel Trailer; Scientific Findings; Tonight Show Sponsors; Hey Robot... (Leslie Jones); Alvvays performed "Belinda Says"
1775	January 11, 2023	Finn Wolfhard, Meghann Fahy, Drew & Jonathan Scott	Myke Towers
Jimmy and the Scott brothers parody The Shining at the top of the program; Airline Statements; C-SPAN Ad; Tariq is upset about things being recalled; Catchphrase (Tariq & Meghann Fahy Vs. Jimmy Fallon & Finn Wolfhard); Myke Towers performed "ULALA"
1776	January 12, 2023	Chelsea Handler, Matthew Macfadyen	Ralph Barbosa
Prince Harry: New Book Titles; Tonight Show #hashtags: #ThatsMyFamily; Tonight Show Audience Suggestion Box (Yellowstone theme done with kazoos, Jimmy uses his chair to get around the studio, Jimmy and Tariq have a VR interview, Drew & Jonathan Scott sing The Righteous Brothers, Wednesday Addams and M3GAN have a dance-off)
1777	January 13, 2023	Lea Michele, Sadie Sink	Dayglow
Friday the 13th on The Tonight Show; Jeopardy! Contestants; Quarterback Quotes; Plane Ad; Thank You Notes; Charades (Jimmy Fallon & Sadie Sink Vs. Tariq & Lea Michele); Tonight Show Mimic Challenge (Sadie Sink); Dayglow performed "Then It All Goes Away"
1778	January 16, 2023	Aubrey Plaza, Jalyn Hall	Sudan Archives
Martin Luther King Jr. Day Statements; Joe Biden: Whisperer in Chief; Jimmy lists the things he loves; Mark Kelley is excited about Sex and the City; Maine Welcome Signs; Tonight Show Monday Motivations; Tonight Show Guest Test (Aubrey Plaza); Sudan Archives performed "Homesick"
1779	January 17, 2023	Katie Holmes, Danielle Deadwyler	Anuel AA
Tom Brady Statements; New England Patriots Quotes; Netflix Slogans; Tonight Show WeTweet; Tonight Show Fast Talkers (Katie Holmes); Danielle Deadwyler performed "Baby Got Back" as Gollum and performed "I Won't Complain"; Anuel AA performed "El Nene/Sufro"
1780	January 18, 2023	Yara Shahidi, John Leguizamo	SG Lewis
Jimmy uses musical titles to explain what's going on in politics; George Santos Definitions; Liv Golf Ad; Tonight Show Popular Mathematics; Freestylin' with The Roots; SG Lewis performed "Lifetime"
1781	January 19, 2023	John Oliver, Sam Smith	Fahim Anwar
Airline Statements; Party City Headquarters; Cat/Dog Quotes; Avatar Narrator Auditions; Tonight Show #hashtags: #MyFootballSuperstition; Tonight Show Ten in Twelve (John Oliver)
1782	January 20, 2023	Colin Jost, Kenya Barris	Tobe Nwigwe
Hot Sax; Tonight Show Dos & Don'ts; Tonight Show Superlatives; George Santos (Jon Lovitz); Thank You Notes; Tobe Nwigwe performed "FYE FYE"
1783	January 23, 2023	Aaron Judge, Josh Duhamel	Freddie Gibbs featuring Anderson .Paak
Democrat Statements; Viral TikTok Videos; Tonight Show Google Autofails; Tonight Show Blow Your Mind (Aaron Judge); Freddie Gibbs featuring Anderson .Paak performed "Blackest in the Room/Feel No Pain"
1784	January 24, 2023	Natasha Lyonne, Nate Bargatze, Brianne Howey & Antonia Gentry	Stephen Sanchez
Jimmy lists off The Bachelor contestants; Questlove and Tariq re-enact a scene from The Bachelor; Least Popular Birthday Party Themes; Tonight Show WeTweet; Stephen Sanchez performed "Evangeline"
1785	January 25, 2023	Keke Palmer, Jeff Gordon, Lauren London	HARDY featuring Lainey Wilson
Tonight Show News Smash; Tonight Show #hashtags: #AddAWordFixAMovie; Tonight Show Jinx Challenge (Keke Palmer); HARDY featuring Lainey Wilson performed "Wait in the Truck"
1786	January 26, 2023	Michael B. Jordan, Hugh Dancy, Måneskin	Måneskin featuring Tom Morello
Donald Trump Texts; TikTok Bill Highlights; Senator/Congressmen Quotes; Lyft Notices; Måneskin featuring Tom Morello performed "Gossip"
1787	January 27, 2023	Claire Danes, Roman Reigns	Cathy Ladman
Football Player Statements; President Biden with No Context; Tonight Show Superlatives; Thank You Notes; Password (Jimmy Fallon & Claire Danes Vs. Tariq & Roman Reigns)
1788	January 30, 2023	Austin Butler, Rob Gronkowski	Tyler Hubbard
Donna Kelce Statement; Ron DeSantis 2024 Campaign Slogans; Austria Ad; Your Cholesterol Is Alarmingly High, Charlie Brown!; Jimmy recaps January; Egg Russian Roulette (Austin Butler); Rob Gronkowski plays paper football; Tyler Hubbard performed "Dancin' in the Country"
1789	January 31, 2023	Dave Bautista, Sarah Michelle Gellar	Bryan Adams
Joe Biden's Head on Donald Trump Jr.'s Body; Politician Quotes; Bob Woodward/Donald Trump Recording; George Santos Statement; Jimmy skips through the boring parts of weather reports; Tonight Show WeTweet; Todd Taft's Odd Crafts Podcast (Dave Bautista); Bryan Adams performed "So Happy It Hurts"

=== February ===
No.	Original release date	Guest(s)	Musical/entertainment guest(s)
1790	February 1, 2023	Derek Jeter, Rita Ora	Rita Ora
Phil McGraw Statement; The Bachelor Ad; Groundhog Day Eve; Tonight Show Polls; Tonight Show True Confessions (Rita Ora, Derek Jeter); Rita Ora performed "You Only Love Me"
1791	February 2, 2023	Pedro Pascal, Kathryn Newton	Armani White
Jimmy is upset about Netflix password sharing; AI De-aging; Tonight Show Acronym News; Tonight Show #hashtags: #MisheardLyrics; Armani White performed "Goated"
1792	February 3, 2023	Kit Harington, Tyler James Williams	Paul Shaffer and the World's Most Dangerous Band
Paul Shaffer and the World's Most Dangerous Band fills in for The Roots for the broadcast; Thank You Notes; Jimmy races Sergio Pérez on a go-kart; Impression Medley with Paul Shaffer
1793	February 6, 2023	Ashton Kutcher, Alison Brie	Dermot Kennedy
Knock at the Cabin Sequels; Tonight Show Monday Motivations; Tonight Show Impossible Pictionary (Alison Brie & Questlove Vs. Ashton Kutcher & Jimmy Fallon); Alison Brie freestyle raps; Dermot Kennedy performed "One Life"
1794	February 7, 2023	Christoph Waltz, Tig Notaro	Fitz and the Tantrums
Fox Sports Statement; Tariq is upset about things being recalled; Tonight Show WeTweet; Christoph Waltz tries on cold weather jackets; Fitz and the Tantrums performed "Moneymaker"
1795	February 8, 2023	Queen Latifah, M. Night Shyamalan	Orlando Leyba
Tonight Show News Smash; Kamala Harris Vs. Kevin McCarthy; Kiss Cam; Tonight Show Whisper Challenge (Queen Latifah)
1796	February 9, 2023	Matthew McConaughey, Evangeline Lilly, Jorma Taccone	Lang Lang
Donna Kelce Cookies for NFL Players; Tonight Show Superlatives; Roses and Thorns; Tonight Show #hashtags: #3WordSuperBowl; Evangeline Lilly teaches Jimmy how she acted out getting shrunk in Ant-Man and the Wasp: Quantumania; Lang Lang performed a medley of Disney songs
1797	February 10, 2023	Paul Rudd, Marc Maron	Kelela
Thank You Notes; Puppy Predictors: Super Bowl LVII Edition; Jimmy uses a remote control to make him and Paul Rudd speak different languages during the interview; Marc Maron plays guitar with The Roots; Kelela performed "Enough for Love"
1798	February 13, 2023	Elizabeth Banks, Kelsey Grammer, Chef Jordan Andino	N/A
Super Bowl Excuse Generator; Valentine's Day Cards; Teenie Weenie Beanie (with Paul Rudd); Jimmy checks his Super Bowl bingo card; Tonight Show Perm Week; Tonight Show Super Bowl Leftovers Challenge with Chef Jordan Andino
1799	February 14, 2023	Chip and Joanna Gaines, Rhett & Link	Amanda Shires & Jason Isbell
Valentine's Day Data; Ask the Fallons; Tonight Show Perm Week; Tonight Show Jinx (Chip and Joanna Gaines Vs. Rhett & Link); Rhett & Link try to identify best friends in the audience; Amanda Shires & Jason Isbell performed "Hawk for the Dove"
1800	February 15, 2023	Liam Neeson, Jack Whitehall	Nate Smith
Singles Awareness Day Candy; Steve Higgins got catfished by his family; Tariq cannot see Ant-Man and the Wasp: Quantumania; Tonight Show WeTweet; Tonight Show Perm Week; Liam Neeson teaches Jimmy how to throw a fake punch; Nate Smith performed "Whiskey on You"
1801	February 16, 2023	Travis Kelce, Jay Hernandez	Samara Joy
Joe Biden Physical Questions; Politician Slang; Tonight Show #hashtags: #WhyImSingle; Tonight Show Perm Week; Travis Kelce and Jimmy performed "(You Gotta) Fight for Your Right (To Party!)"; Samara Joy performed "Guess Who I Saw Today"
1802	February 17, 2023	Adam Scott, Elizabeth Debicki	Nathan Macintosh
Jimmy celebrates the ninth anniversary of the show; Jimmy plays an audience member; Tariq and Jimmy rap about Pepsi; Steve Higgins mispronounces things; Thank You Notes; Tonight Show Perm Week; Adam Scott and Jimmy try on wigs
1803	February 27, 2023	Gigi Hadid, Chase Stokes, Micky Dolenz	Dierks Bentley
Jimmy impersonates Bob Dylan performing about actress award nominees at the top of the program; How Congressmen/women Spent Their Week Off; Amazon.com Customer Statements; Tariq is upset about things being recalled; Tonight Show Monday Motivations; Tonight Show Will UB My BFF? (Gigi Hadid, Chase Stokes); Micky Dolenz performed "Last Train to Clarksville"; Dierks Bentley performed "Sun Sets in Colorado"
1804	February 28, 2023	Willem Dafoe, Marlon Wayans, Macklemore	Kelsey Cook
Jimmy recaps the month; Tonight Show WeTweet

=== March ===
No.	Original release date	Guest(s)	Musical/entertainment guest(s)
1805	March 1, 2023	Ice-T, Stephanie Hsu	Adam Lambert
Cocaine Baby Yoda; Tonight Show News & Improved; Tonight Show Show Me Something Good; Adam Lambert performed "Do You Really Want to Hurt Me"
1806	March 2, 2023	Brendan Fraser, Tan France	Lizzy McAlpine
Congressmen/women Quotes; Dictionary.com Commercial; the crew share book recommendations; I'm Thinking of a Pasta (Steve Higgins, Jimmy Fallon, Questlove, Tariq); Tonight Show #hashtags: #ThatsMyJam; Goat Leg Greg (Brendan Fraser); Lizzy McAlpine performed "Ceilings"
1807	March 3, 2023	Tessa Thompson, Andy Cohen	The National
Tonight Show Similarities; Thank You Notes; Tonight Show Battle of the Instant Stand–ups; Tessa Thompson tries eggs for the first time; The National performed "Tropic Morning News"
1808	March 6, 2023	Chance the Rapper, Maude Apatow	Chance the Rapper
CPAC Trump Teleprompter; Tonight Show Sponsors; Tonight Show Peanut Butter That's My Jam Tic Tac Toe (Chance the Rapper); Audrey from Little Shop of Horrors makes a surprise appearance during Maude Apatow's interview; Chance the Rapper performed "YAH Know"
1809	March 7, 2023	Adam Driver, Ana Gasteyer	Macklemore featuring Morray
Chicken Quotes; Hard Versions of Kid Products; Tonight Show WeTweet; Freestylin' with The Roots; Jimmy gives Ana Gasteyer a tote bag; Macklemore featuring Morray performed "Tail Lights"
1810	March 8, 2023	Kerry Washington, Jenna Lyons	St. Vincent & The Roots
Senator Quotes; Netflix Notifications; Tonight Show Google Autofails; GE Tonight Show Fallonventions: Kid's Inventions; Tonight Show MMMHMMMHMMM (Kerry Washington); St. Vincent & The Roots performed "Glory Box"
1811	March 9, 2023	Jenna Ortega, Hannah Waddingham	Twice
95th Academy Awards Promo; Spotify Ad; Valentine's Day Cards; Jimmy, The Roots and the cast of The Super Mario Bros. Movie performed an a cappella version of the Super Mario Bros. theme (cameos by Shigeru Miyamoto and Chris Meledandri); Tonight Show #hashtags: #IDeserveAnAward; Box of Lies (Jenna Ortega); Twice performed "Set Me Free"
1812	March 10, 2023	Lucy Liu, Damson Idris	Bizarrap & Shakira
Thank You Notes; Tonight Show Lip Flip (Lucy Liu); Bizarrap & Shakira performed "Shakira: Bzrp Music Sessions, Vol. 53"
1813	March 13, 2023	Bob Odenkirk, Paris Hilton, Collin Morikawa	Asake
Donald Trump Album Ad; Steve Higgins mispronounces things; Asake performed "Yoga/Organise"
1814	March 14, 2023	Bryan Cranston, Penn Badgley	Maya Hawke
Donald Trump Quotes; Jimmy gives a t-shirt to an audience member; Bryan Cranston impersonates Willie Nelson; Das Beats of ze Heart (Bryan Cranston); Maya Hawke performed "Thérèse"
1815	March 15, 2023	Keira Knightley, Zachary Levi, Rina Sawayama	Nore Davis
George Santos FEC Form 2; March Madness Signs; March Madness Player Name Combinations; Tonight Show Pie Charts
1816	March 16, 2023	Keanu Reeves, Melanie Lynskey, De La Soul	De La Soul & The Roots
Tonight Show #hashtags: #IWasTodayYearsOld; Tonight Show Pup Quiz (Keanu Reeves); De La Soul & The Roots performed "Stakes Is High"
1817	March 17, 2023	Kenan Thompson & Kel Mitchell, Padma Lakshmi	N/A
Kenan Thompson chats with Jimmy in his dressing room at the top of the program (appearance by Kel Mitchell); TikTok User Videos; Jimmy performed a song about St. Patrick's Day; Thank You Notes; Kenan Thompson & Kel Mitchell performed the Good Burger song; Padma Lakshmi and Jimmy have hot dogs without the hot dogs; Padma Lakshmi settles food debates; Tonight Show Cake Flip (Jimmy Fallon & The Roots)
1818	March 20, 2023	Florence Pugh, Gaten Matarazzo	Talib Kweli & Madlib
Tariq fills in for Steve Higgins as announcer; Donald Trump Definitions; Tiny Song; Tonight Show Guest Test (Florence Pugh); Talib Kweli & Madlib performed "Air Quotes"
1819	March 21, 2023	Jennifer Aniston, Sarah Snook	Preacher Lawson
Tariq fills in for Steve Higgins as announcer; Trump Indictment Bracket; Sweden Statement; Tonight Show WeTweet; Tonight Show Can You Feel It? (Jennifer Aniston)
1820	March 22, 2023	Brian Cox, Heidi Gardner, Mikaela Shiffrin	Caroline Polachek
Tariq fills in for Steve Higgins as announcer; Law & Order Opening Parody; Jimmy interviews Donald Trump using clips of him; Politician Quotes; AI Vs. AI; Mikaela Shiffrin brings Jimmy skis; Caroline Polachek performed "Welcome to My Island"
1821	March 23, 2023	Kiefer Sutherland, Jimin	Fall Out Boy
Tariq fills in for Steve Higgins as announcer; Donald Trump Checklist; Mascot Quotes; Tonight Show #hashtags: #MarchDadness; Tonight Show Audience Suggestion Box (Stranger Things: The Musical, Waze 2 Luv U, Tariq on Peppa Pig, Cluck Cluck Boys performed "Sugar, We're Goin' Down"); Fall Out Boy performed "Hold Me Like a Grudge"
1822	March 24, 2023	Kieran Culkin, Method Man	Jimin
Jimin meets with Jimmy at the top of the program; Tariq fills in for Steve Higgins as announcer; Thank You Notes; Tonight Show Flip Shots (Kieran Culkin, Method Man); Jimin performed "Like Crazy"
1823	March 27, 2023	Nathan Lane, Dove Cameron	Lil Uzi Vert
Trump Teleprompter; Tonight Show WeTweet; Password (Nathan Lane & Jimmy Fallon Vs. Questlove & Dove Cameron); Lil Uzi Vert performed "Just Wanna Rock"
1824	March 28, 2023	Adam Sandler, Nicholas Hoult	Penn & Teller
Trump Vs. Biden Tours; Tariq is upset about things being recalled; Jimmy announces his new line of sunglasses; Nicholas Hoult and Jimmy have crickets
1825	March 29, 2023	Kevin Bacon, Jay Pharoah	Coco Jones
Paltrow Vs. Pence Court Questions; Jimmy uses Character.ai; First Drafts of Rock (Kevin Bacon); Jay Pharoah does impressions; Coco Jones performed "ICU"
1826	March 30, 2023	Edward Norton, Ego Nwodim	Parker McCollum
Donald Trump Indictment Video Parody; Jimmy performed a parody of "Take Me Out to the Ball Game"; Baseball Player Combinations; BlackBerry Ad; Tonight Show #hashtags: #SpringBreakFail; Puppy Predictors: 2023 Final Four Edition; Parker McCollum performed "Handle on You"
1827	March 31, 2023	Chris Pratt, Elizabeth Vargas	Maisie Peters
Jimmy recaps the month; Thank You Notes; Tonight Show Pop Quiz (Chris Pratt); Maisie Peters performed "Lost the Breakup"

=== April ===
No.	Original release date	Guest(s)	Musical/entertainment guest(s)
1828	April 3, 2023	Michelle Williams, John Stamos, Mo Willems	Chvrches
Tonight Show News & Improved; Mo Willems gives the studio audience a drawing lesson; Chvrches performed "Over"
1829	April 4, 2023	Keegan-Michael Key, Sir Richard Branson	Blondshell
Politician Quotes; Tonight Show WeTweet; Tonight Show Fast Talkers (Keegan-Michael Key); Blondshell performed "Salad"
1830	April 5, 2023	Matt Damon, Cecily Strong	Rema
Tonight Show Audience Trivia Night; Beer Pong Basketball (Matt Damon); Rema performed "Calm Down/Holiday"
1831	April 6, 2023	Molly Shannon, Ramón Rodríguez	Sophie Buddle
Tonight Show News Smash; AI Detection; Tonight Show #hashtags: #MySiblingsWeird; Tonight Show What's Up, Dog?: Sports Edition; Ramón Rodríguez and Jimmy have coquitos
1832	April 7, 2023	Jonas Brothers, Chloe Bailey	The Foodie Magician
Steve Higgins mispronounces things; Pope Francis Documentary Clip; Tonight Show You Pick the Joke; Thank You Notes
1833	April 17, 2023	Chris Evans, Lord Andrew Lloyd Webber	Toosii
Songs to Describe Politicians; Politician Attack Ads; Plant Dad song (appearance by Andy Samberg); Tonight Show Whisper Challenge (Chris Evans); Lord Andrew Lloyd Webber performs for the audience a medley of songs from his musicals; Toosii performed "Favorite Song"
1834	April 18, 2023	Ana de Armas, Jesse Plemons	Mike Vecchione
Busch Gardens Ad; Hashtag the Panda; Tonight Show WeTweet; Musical Stairs (with Jonas Brothers performing "Waffle House"); Ana de Armas and Jimmy have ice cream (special appearance by Ben Cohen & Jerry Greenfield); Backtionary (Ana de Armas)
1835	April 19, 2023	Michelle Obama, Kelvin Harrison Jr.	Sampa the Great featuring Angélique Kidjo
Harry Potter TV Series Casting; Charles III Recipe; Tonight Show Bookstore Surprise with Michelle Obama (Michelle Obama); Sampa the Great featuring Angélique Kidjo performed "Let Me Be Great"
1836	April 20, 2023	Ray Romano, Zoe Lister-Jones	Flo
The crew says statements differently; Jimmy performed an original song about Earth Day; Tonight Show #hashtags: #StonerThoughts; Pictionary (Ray Romano & Tariq Vs. Jimmy Fallon & Zoe Lister-Jones); Flo performed "Fly Girl"
1837	April 21, 2023	Sienna Miller, Nikolaj Coster-Waldau, Gabriel Basso	Ryan Hamilton
Senator Quotes; Coachella Ad; Say Whaaaat!?; Thank You Notes
1838	April 24, 2023	Kate Beckinsale, Rainn Wilson, Romeo Santos	Romeo Santos
Celebrity Talk Shows; Joe Biden Reelection Ad; Political Poll; Kate Beckinsale and Jimmy have cereal; Romeo Santos performed "Solo Conmigo/Suegra"
1839	April 25, 2023	Jude Law, Joshua Jackson	Jackie Fabulous
Joe Biden Interview Using Clips; Charles III Coronation Seating Chart; Tonight Show Sponsors; Tonight Show WeTweet
1840	April 26, 2023	Michael Strahan, Judy Blume	EUPHORIA, Black Thought & El Michels Affair featuring KIRBY
Jimmy interviews Donald Trump using clips; the crew says what they like about the spring season; Tonight Show #hashtags: #IfIWasPresident; Michael Strahan brings his new skincare line; Tonight Show Stic Tac Toe (Michael Strahan); EUPHORIA, Black Thought & El Michels Affair featuring KIRBY performed "Glorious Game"
1841	April 27, 2023	Drew Barrymore, Lizzy Caplan, Young Mazino	The National
The Little Mermaid Ad; Ew! sketch (Drew Barrymore); Lizzy Caplan brings an intimacy coordinator briefing of a scene from Fatal Attraction; The National performed "Eucalyptus"
1842	April 28, 2023	Pete Davidson, Questlove & S. A. Cosby	Peso Pluma
Jimmy informs the audience about senators; Jimmy recaps the month; Thank You Notes; Random Object Shootout (Pete Davidson); Peso Pluma performed "Ella Baila Sola"

=== May ===
No.	Original release date	Guest(s)	Musical/entertainment guest(s)
1843	May 1, 2023	Rosie O'Donnell, SUGA	SUGA
Jimmy Fallon, John Fogerty & The Roots sing "Lookin' Out My Back Door" with classroom instruments; Tonight Show Imposter Challenge (SUGA); SUGA performed "Haegeum"

=== October ===
No.	Original release date	Guest(s)	Musical/entertainment guest(s)
1844	October 2, 2023	Matthew McConaughey, John Mayer	John Mayer
NFL Player Quotes; Bono at the Sphere at the Venetian Resort; Applebee's Ad; Matthew McConaughey and Jimmy performed "Just Because"; John Mayer performed "Shouldn't Matter But It Does"
1845	October 3, 2023	Taraji P. Henson, Geri Halliwell-Horner	Jelly Roll
Kevin McCarthy's Greatest Moments as Speaker of the House; Jimmy portrays Emmanuel Macron; the crew divulges what they did over the summer; Tonight Show WePost; Humdinger (Taraji P. Henson & Jimmy Fallon Vs. Questlove & Geri Halliwell-Horner); Jelly Roll performed "Halfway to Hell"
1846	October 4, 2023	Chelsea Handler, Willie Geist	Carly Pearce
Republican Excuse Generator; Jimmy raps about Republicans; Jimmy portrays Patrick McHenry; Tonight Show Life Coach with Chelsea Handler (Chelsea Handler); Carly Pearce performed "Country Music Made Me Do It"
1847	October 5, 2023	Maluma, Hayley Williams	Maluma
Republican Presidential Candidate Data; Tonight Show #hashtags: #CelebrityDreamCouple; Tonight Show Battle of the Instant Songwriters; Hayley Williams and Jimmy perform into commercial; Maluma performed "Según Quién"
1848	October 6, 2023	J. J. Watt, Eric McCormack	Killer Mike featuring Robert Glasper & Eryn Allen Kane
The Bachelor Vs. The Golden Bachelor; NFL Ad; Regan MacNeil performed "Cruel Summer"; Thank You Notes; J. J. Watt and Jimmy have a drink; Tonight Show Mad Lib Theater (J. J. Watt); Killer Mike featuring Robert Glasper & Eryn Allen Kane performed "Motherless"
1849	October 9, 2023	Josh Gad & Andrew Rannells, Nate Bargatze	Ian Lara
Tariq is upset at things being recalled; Tonight Show Sponsors; Josh Gad, Andrew Rannells and Jimmy performed "Take On Me"; Tonight Show Celebrity Hats (Josh Gad & Andrew Rannells)
1850	October 10, 2023	Pete Davidson, Troye Sivan	Josh Johnson
Tariq and Jimmy have pumpkin spice lattes; Kevin McCarthy Ad; Republican Quotes; Tonight Show WePost; Freestylin' with The Roots
1851	October 11, 2023	Seth Meyers, Joe La Puma	Alexander Stewart
Fake Vs. Real Amazon.com Reviews; Kamal Gray's Lottery Numbers; Good News Bad News; Tonight Show Swap Quiz; Joe La Puma brings sneakers; Alexander Stewart performed "I Wish You Cheated"
1852	October 12, 2023	Leslie Odom Jr., Chloe Fineman	Raye
The News: Taylor's Version; AI Photos; Tonight Show #hashtags: #FallSongs; Charades (Tariq & Leslie Odom Jr. Vs. Jimmy Fallon & Chloe Fineman); Chloe Fineman does impressions; Raye performed "Escapism/Worth It"
1853	October 13, 2023	Kelly Clarkson, Henrik Lundqvist	Kelly Clarkson
Horror Film Mashup; Tim Barrett; Thank You Notes; Kelly Clarkson gives out concert tickets to the audience; Tonight Show Back That Track Up (Kelly Clarkson); Kelly Clarkson performed "Lighthouse"
1854	October 16, 2023	Uma Thurman, Lil Rel Howery	Feist
Tonight Show Goodbye Hello; Tonight Show Dance Your Hat and Gloves Off; Hey Robot... (Lil Rel Howery); Feist performed "Hiding Out in the Open"
1855	October 17, 2023	Issa Rae, Paris Hilton	Jared Freid
Jimmy meets with Paris Hilton in her dressing room at the top of the program; Tonight Show WePost; Tonight Show Flip Shots (Paris Hilton, Issa Rae); the crew have drinks with Issa Rae; Can You Lady and the Tramp This Bowl of Pasta?
1856	October 18, 2023	Ronnie Wood, Sam Heughan	David Kushner
Congressmen/women Quotes; Steve Higgins names Disney characters; Tonight Show News Radio; Sam Heughan and Jimmy have drinks; Tonight Show Pumpkin Paint Challenge; David Kushner performed "Daylight"
1857	October 19, 2023	Bad Bunny, Charli D'Amelio	Victoria Monét
Jimmy speaks Spanish; Jimmy skips through the boring parts of TikTok videos; The Golden Bachelor Auditions; Tonight Show #hashtags: #PetCostumes; the crew give shoutouts; Victoria Monét performed "On My Mama"
1858	October 20, 2023	Keith Richards, 2 Chainz & Lil Wayne	2 Chainz & Lil Wayne
Keith Richards comes out early; Thank You Notes; Keith Richards plays guitar and performs with Jimmy; 2 Chainz & Lil Wayne performed "Presha"
1859	October 23, 2023	Jacob Elordi, Julius Randle	Leslie Liao
Republican Candidate Statements; Amazon Alexa House Speaker Ad; Statue Quotes; Tariq's segment gets cut (Tariq and Jimmy performed "Just Once", appearance by Julius Randle); Tonight Show Polls; Tonight Show Firsts (Jacob Elordi); Julius Randle brings Jimmy sneakers
1860	October 24, 2023	Josh Groban, John Stamos	Tyla
Tonight Show The News in Pictures; NBA Song; Singer Quotes; discussion about anti-aging cream (appearance by John Stamos); Tonight Show WePost; Tonight Show Freezer Secrets (Mick Jagger); Josh Groban performed from Sweeney Todd: The Demon Barber of Fleet Street; Tyla performed "Water"
1861	October 25, 2023	Cameron Diaz, Guy Raz	Eslabon Armado featuring Gabito Ballesteros
Donald Trump Definitions; The Golden Bachelor Narrated by Morgan Freeman; Tonight Show Google Autofails; Tonight Show Jump Scare VR Challenge (Cameron Diaz); Cameron Diaz and Jimmy have wine; Eslabon Armado featuring Gabito Ballesteros performed "La Fresa"
1862	October 26, 2023	Tracy Morgan, Tim Grover	Jorja Smith
Trader Joe's Ad; Jimmy goes through various photos trying to find out who the Speaker of the House is; Audiobook Readings; New Fragrances; Tonight Show #hashtags: #LastMinuteCostumeIdeas; Tonight Show Life Coach with Tracy Morgan (Tracy Morgan); Jorja Smith performed "Falling or Flying/Little Things"
1863	October 27, 2023	Heidi Klum, Matt Hranek	Depeche Mode
"NBC Sunday Night" Music Video; Thank You Notes; Egg Russian Roulette (Heidi Klum); Matt Hranek teaches Jimmy how to take a "meat pic"; Depeche Mode performed "Wagging Tongue"
1864	October 30, 2023	Michael Shannon, Annaleigh Ashford	Jesus Trejo
Tariq is upset about things being recalled; Five Nights at Freddy's Film Sequel Trailer; Tonight Show Trivia Night; Online Friend Race
1865	October 31, 2023	Taylor Lautner, Alex Cooper	Depeche Mode
Halloween Data; Jimmy recaps the month; Tonight Show WePost; Tonight Show Audience Suggestion Box (Jimmy juggles pumpkins, horror characters do the macarena, TikTok Halloween video, the crew performed a song about Timothée Chalamet); Taylor Lautner shows Jimmy how to do a tornado kick; Alex Cooper brings her dog out; Depeche Mode performed "My Favorite Stranger"

=== November ===
No.	Original release date	Guest(s)	Musical/entertainment guest(s)
1866	November 1, 2023	Jack Antonoff, Mo Rocca	Bleachers
Tonight Show News Smash; Trump University Ad; Tonight Show News & Improved; Tonight Show Show Me Something Good; Bleachers performed "Modern Girl"
1867	November 2, 2023	Sheryl Crow, Cailee Spaeny	Sheryl Crow
What's the Speaker's Name?; Stranger Things Ad; Coffee Chain Holiday Ads; Jimmy reminisces about having a world record; Tonight Show One–Second Beatles Song Quiz; Sheryl Crow performed "Alarm Clock"
1868	November 3, 2023	Michelle Pfeiffer, Bobby Flay	N/A
Courtroom Sketch Quotes; Uber Driver Notifications; Jeff Bezos Quotes; NASA+ Ad; the crew tells monologue jokes; Gus Rumpley; Jimmy Fallon, Sheryl Crow & The Roots sing "All I Wanna Do" with classroom instruments; Thank You Notes
1869	November 6, 2023	Jungkook, Please Don't Destroy	Jungkook
Election Polls; Political Ads; Dinosaur Chicken Nuggets Ad; Tonight Show Sponsors; Tonight Show Ask Alexa; the crew gets invited to a party but can't make it; Jungkook and Jimmy have pizza; Jungkook performed "Standing Next to You"
1870	November 7, 2023	Brian Cox, Maren Morris	Maren Morris featuring Mickey Guyton & Brittney Spencer
Voting Stickers; My Name Is Barbra Audiobook Readings; Tonight Show WePost; Robert Glasper, Derrick Hodge & Chris Dave sit in with The Roots; Pearls of Wisdom with Goat Leg Greg and Gilvin of the Tree (Brian Cox); Maren Morris, Mickey Guyton, and Brittney Spencer performed "The Tree"
1871	November 8, 2023	John Oliver, Matt Rife	Black Pumas
Ballot Measures; Ron DeSantis Ad; The Golden Bachelor Ad; Robert Glasper, Derrick Hodge & Chris Dave sit in with The Roots; John Oliver comes out in a bird costume; Jimmy performs with Robert Glasper; Black Pumas performed "More Than a Love Song"
1872	November 9, 2023	Jared Leto, AJR	AJR
Please Don't Destroy crash the monologue to promote their new film; Steve Higgins tells everyone what he's been up to; Jared Leto has a moment with Jimmy climbing the Empire State Building; Tonight Show #hashtags: #MyWeirdCoworker; Tonight Show Battle of the Instant Songwriters; AJR performed "Yes I'm a Mess"
1873	November 10, 2023	Tom Hiddleston, Brie Larson, Eric Idle	Rick Ross & Meek Mill
Mario Interview; Other Jars; Thank You Notes; Tonight Show Singing Whisper Challenge (Brie Larson); Rick Ross & Meek Mill performed "Shaq & Kobe/I'm a Boss"
1874	November 13, 2023	Dwayne Johnson, Colman Domingo	Cat Power
Joe Biden Interview; Worst Toys List; Tonight Show FAO Schwarz Surprise (Dwayne Johnson); Dwayne Johnson and Jimmy rap into commercial; Cat Power performed "Like a Rolling Stone"
1875	November 14, 2023	Viola Davis, Jeff Probst	Robert Glasper featuring SiR & Alex Isley
Steve Higgins knows about cocaine; Donald Trump Quotes; Toys "R" Us Ads; Tonight Show WePost; Freestylin' with The Roots; Robert Glasper featuring SiR & Alex Isley performed "Back to Love"
1876	November 15, 2023	Taika Waititi, Rachel Zegler, Tariq Trotter, Timothy Hollingsworth	N/A
Senator Quotes; Tonight Show Moral of the Stories; Tonight Show Next Goal Wins (Taika Waititi)
1877	November 16, 2023	Jason Momoa, Elizabeth Debicki, Drew & Jonathan Scott	Thumpasaurus
Random People Quotes; Jimmy and Tariq rap about Jason Momoa (appearance by Jason Momoa); Tonight Show Polls; Tonight Show #hashtags: #WorstThanksgiving; Tonight Show Aquamen and Buckets (Jason Momoa); Thumpasaurus performed "Struttin'"
1878	November 17, 2023	Scarlett Johansson, Hunter Schafer	Tina Friml
Wrong Jeopardy!; "The Ballad of Travis Kelce"; Thank You Notes; Tonight Show Wrap Me Up (Scarlett Johansson; the audience receives products from Johansson's new skincare line); Hunter Schafer gives Jimmy an acting class
1879	November 20, 2023	Sterling K. Brown, Jenna Bush Hager & Barbara Pierce Bush	Davido
Turkey Programs; The Real Turkeys of Gobblers Rest Ad; Tonight Show Trivia Night; Tonight Show What's Up, Dog?; Davido performed "Unavailable/Feel"
1880	November 21, 2023	Tim Allen, Jenna Lyons	Derrick Stroup
Joe Biden Quotes; Donald Trump Cognitive Test; Tonight Show Go On, Git!; Jenna Lyons gives Jimmy a coat
1881	November 22, 2023	Kenan Thompson & Kel Mitchell, Joel Kinnaman, Mario Carbone	N/A
Airline Text Alerts; Ken Burns Documentary; Tonight Show A Show of Hands; Tonight Show #hashtags: #MyFamilyIsWeird; Pictionary (Jimmy Fallon & Joel Kinnaman Vs. Kenan Thompson & Kel Mitchell)
1882	November 23, 2023	Cher, Mike Birbiglia	Offset
Jimmy has a Thanksgiving message for his relatives; Tonight Show Superlatives; Thanksgiving Bingo; Thank You Notes; Tonight Show Freezer Secrets (Cher); Cher and Jimmy have frozen hot chocolate; Offset performed "Worth It"

=== December ===
No.	Original release date	Guest(s)	Musical/entertainment guest(s)
1883	December 4, 2023	Dua Lipa, Benny Safdie, Brad Paisley	Brad Paisley
White House Staffer Quotes; Tonight Show Did Ya Know?; Jimmy tries CPR on a dummy; Tonight Show Ask Alexa; Hal & Val (Dua Lipa); Brad Paisley performed a song he wrote for his wedding, and "Son of the Mountains"
1884	December 5, 2023	Julia Roberts, Hasan Minhaj	Busta Rhymes featuring Cie, Trillian & Rai
Brenda Lee Statement; Netflix Raft; Nelly Interview; Tonight Show Sponsors; Tonight Show Polls; Box of Lies (Julia Roberts); Busta Rhymes featuring Cie, Trillian & Rai performed "The Statement/Legacy"
1885	December 6, 2023	J Balvin, Matt Bomer	J Balvin
Donald Trump Statement; Kims Ad; Politician Data; Bottom of the Charts; Tonight Show Screengrabs; J Balvin performed "Amigos"
1886	December 7, 2023	Olivia Rodrigo, Finalists from Squid Game: The Challenge	Ashley McBryde
Politicians Look Like Harry Potter; GOP Debate Remix; Joe Biden Poems; Tonight Show 12 Days of Christmas Sweaters; Tonight Show Singing Whisper Challenge (Olivia Rodrigo); Point Pleasant Police Department (appearance by Cher); Ashley McBryde performed "The Devil I Know"
1887	December 8, 2023	Anne Hathaway, Peter Sarsgaard, Daniel Humm	Fumi Abe
Joe Biden Message (Jimmy portrays Biden); President Quotes; Tonight Show 12 Days of Christmas Sweaters; What's Behind Me? (Anne Hathaway); Anne Hathaway and Jimmy primal scream with the audience; Peter Sarsgaard plays air guitar
1888	December 11, 2023	Mark Wahlberg, Elle Fanning	Carín León
Senators' Favorite Music Groups; Tonight Show 12 Days of Christmas Sweaters; the crew and audience do shoutouts (appearance by Elle Fanning); Mark Wahlberg makes Jimmy do the cold plunge; Carín León performed "Primera Cita"
1889	December 12, 2023	Hugh Grant, Sydney Sweeney	Tate McRae
Google Searches; Tonight Show 12 Days of Christmas Sweaters; Timothée Chalamet makes a surprise appearance during Hugh Grant's interview; Sydney Sweeney brings Jimmy a gift; Tonight Show 30 Seconds to... (Sydney Sweeney); Tate McRae performed "Exes"
1890	December 13, 2023	Timothée Chalamet, David Blaine	Dogstar
Jimmy & Meghan Trainor's "Wrap Me Up" music video debuted at the top of the program; Texts to Taylor Swift; Joe Biden Conference (Jimmy portrays Biden); Tommy DeVito's Agent (portrayed by Jimmy); Tonight Show 12 Days of Christmas Sweaters; Timothée Chalamet brings Wonka–inspired sneakers; Keanu Reeves, Robert Mailhouse, Bret Domrose, Jimmy, Questlove & Tariq participate in David Blaine's magic demonstration; Dogstar performed "Blonde"
1891	December 14, 2023	Billie Eilish, Claire Foy, Rebecca Shaw & Ben Kronengold	Gracie Abrams
What Are You Most Excited For? Poll; Company Stock; Tonight Show 12 Days of Christmas Sweaters; Gracie Abrams performed "I Should Hate You"
1892	December 15, 2023	Jessica Chastain, Alanis Morissette, Ken Burns	Alanis Morissette
Congressmen/women Quotes; Thank You Notes; Tonight Show 12 Days of Christmas Sweaters; Catchphrase (Jessica Chastain & Jimmy Fallon Vs. Questlove & Ken Burns); Alanis Morissette performed "Last Christmas"
1893	December 18, 2023	Mandy Moore, Elvis Duran	Adam Blackstone
Rudy Giuliani Jobs; Tonight Show 12 Days of Christmas Sweaters; Tonight Show Battle of the Instant Songwriters; Adam Blackstone performed "The Little Drummer Boy"
1894	December 19, 2023	Bradley Cooper, Martha Stewart	Rufus & Martha Wainwright
Holiday Cards; Holiday Ads; Tonight Show 12 Days of Christmas Sweaters (Tonight Show Stocking Stuffers); Jimmy reminisces about the crew's time at The Tonight Show Winter Wonderland; Martha Stewart brings Jimmy a gift; Rufus & Martha Wainwright performed "Justice Delivers Its Death"
1895	December 20, 2023	Jon Hamm, Glen Powell	Chloe Flower & The Roots
Supreme Court Justice Quotes; Donald Trump Ad; New Year's Eve Specials; "Get a Gift Card" Music Video; Tonight Show 12 Days of Christmas Sweaters (Tonight Show Stocking Stuffers); Chloe Flower & The Roots performed "Dance of the Sugar Plum Fairy"
1896	December 21, 2023	Travis Scott, Joe Keery	Mario the Maker Magician
Mariah Carey/Joe Biden Inner Thoughts; Film Crossovers; "Holiday Birthday" Music Video; Tonight Show 12 Days of Christmas Sweaters (Tonight Show Stocking Stuffers); Tonight Show Audience Suggestion Box (NFL dubbed with opera singers, The Three Wiseguys, the crew hangs ornaments on the Rockefeller Center Christmas Tree, The Rockettes dance to "Wrap Me Up"); Travis Scott brings Jimmy sneakers
1897	December 22, 2023	Cynthia Erivo, Kiefer Sutherland	Jay Jurden
Highs & Lows; Name That Reindeer!; Tonight Show 12 Days of Christmas Sweaters (Tonight Show Stocking Stuffers); Thank You Notes; Cynthia Erivo whistles "I'll Be Home for Christmas"

== Sources ==
- Official website
- Lineups at Interbridge
