= Gianmarco Soresi =

American comedian and actor (born 1988)

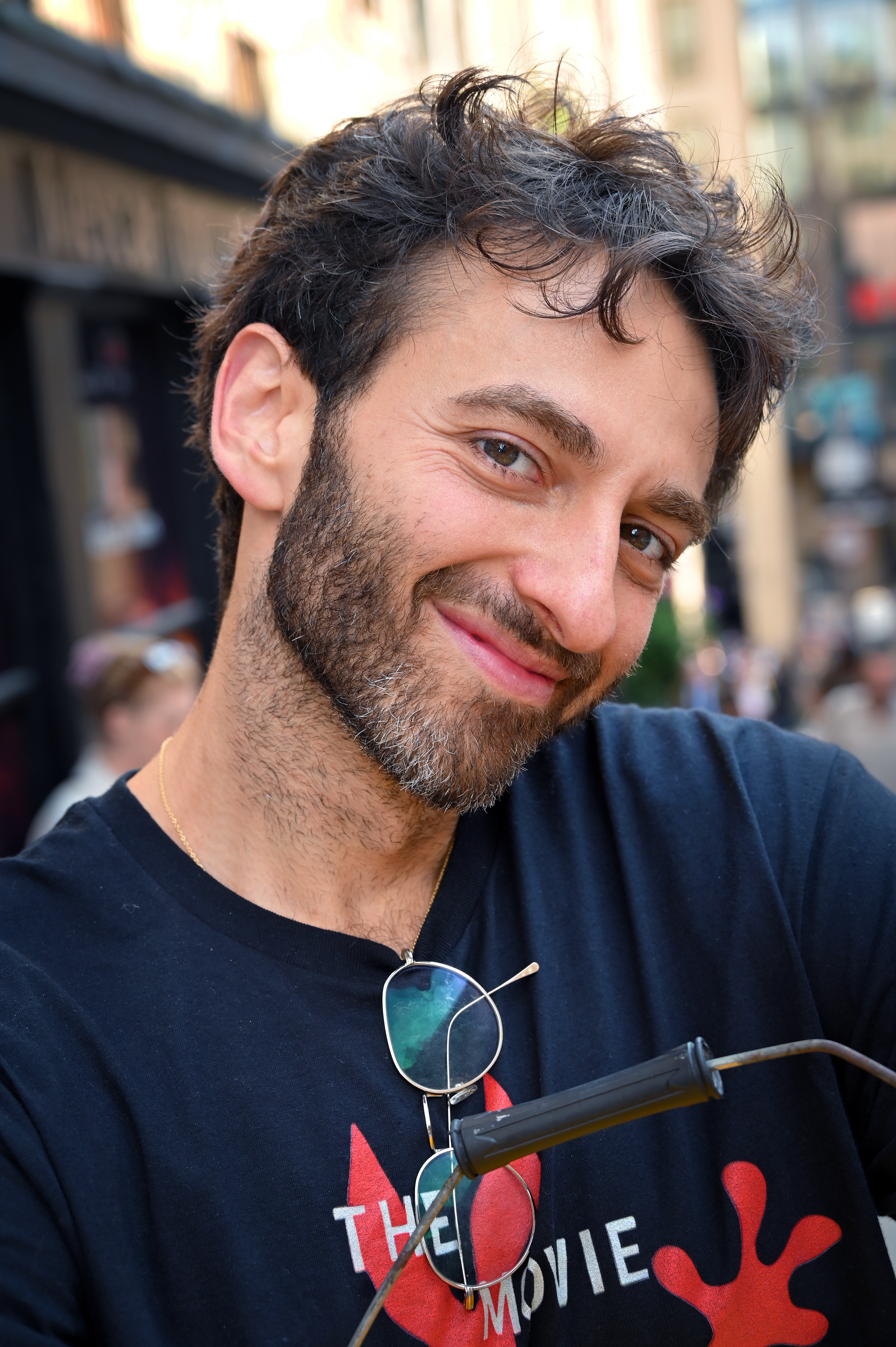
- Soresi in 2025
- Born: Gianmarco Vincent Soresi; August 20, 1988 (age 38); Potomac, Maryland, U.S.
- Education: University of Miami (BFA)

Comedy career
- Years active: 2016–present
- Medium: Stand-up; television; film; YouTube; TikTok
- Genres: Observational comedy; satire
- Subjects: Everyday life; internet culture; American politics; pop culture; current events; relationships; mental health; Jewish culture
- Website: gianmarcosoresi.com

Gianmarco Vincent Soresi (born August 20, 1988) is an American stand-up comedian, actor, podcaster, and internet personality. He is known for his observational comedy and includes themes of everyday life, pop culture, and current events in his stand-up performances.

== Early life ==
Soresi was born on August 20, 1988, in Maryland to an Italian Catholic father and a Jewish mother. His parents divorced shortly after his birth. He attended Georgetown Day School and earned a Bachelor of Fine Arts in musical theater from the University of Miami in 2011.

== Career ==
=== Stand-up comedy ===
After completing college, Soresi moved to New York to pursue comedy and acting full-time. He appeared in a series of General Electric commercials and used the earning to produce the sketch comedy series Matza Pizza. He has also appeared in ads for Coca-Cola and Baby Bottle Pop. Soresi began performing stand-up comedy in 2016. In 2020, he released his first half-hour of material, Shelf Life. Soresi also performed as a part of the "New Faces" showcase at the 2022 Just for Laughs festival in Montreal.

Soresi made his late-night debut on The Late Late Show with James Corden on November 23, 2022. Reviewing Soresi's 2023 appearance on Netflix's Verified Stand-Up, Jason Sinoman for The New York Times wrote that Soresi "alternates between silkily feline physicality and frenetic gesticulation." Soresi also performed sets for Don't Tell Comedy and on Comedy Central, winning Season 8 of Amazon’s Comics Watching Comics. Soresi appeared in an episode of Dropout's comedy panel game show Game Changer alongside comedians Jeff Arcuri and Josh Johnson. The episode was spun-off into a comedy game-show called Crowd Control, and Soresi appeared in its first season.

He released his first full-length comedy special Thief of Joy on YouTube on September 19, 2025, the same week that he performed a stand-up set on The Tonight Show Starring Jimmy Fallon. That same year, Soresi debuted his tour The Drama King and performed at the 2025 Edinburgh Fringe. At the end of 2025, Deadline named him one of the "Comics Who Won 2025".

=== Other ventures ===
Soresi co-hosts The Downside with Gianmarco Soresi, an interview-based comedy podcast produced by Headgum, with actor and comedian Russell Daniels. He is a panelist on NPR's Wait Wait... Don't Tell Me! He is a member of the sketch comedy group Uncle Function alongside Chris Cafero, Daniels, Jessica Frey, Douglas Goodhart, and Joseph Lymous. As an actor, he has made minor appearances in several films and television shows, including Hustlers (2019), The Last O.G. (2018–2021) and Blue Bloods (2010–2024).

== Personal life ==
Soresi previously lived in Lower East Side, New York City, before temporarily moving to Los Angeles in January 2025, just as the wildfires broke out. He currently resides in the Dumbo, Brooklyn, with his partner Tovah Silbermann, a talent manager. The couple has been dating since 2020. He describes himself as a cultural Jew. In the context of the war in Gaza, Soresi has spoken in support of Palestine and against Israel's actions.

== Recognitions ==
- 2022 – New Faces of Comedy, Just For Laughs
- 2024 – Comedians You Should and Will Know, Vulture
- 2024 – The Future Of Funny: 15 Comedians Ready To Break Out In 2025, Deadline
- 2025 – 10 Comics to Watch for 2025, Variety
- 2025 – Comics Who Won 2025, Deadline

== Filmography ==
=== Film ===
Year	Title	Role	Notes
2015	Get Happy!	Ex-Boyfriend No. 9	
2016	Cassanova Was a Woman	Server No. 2	
2018	Accommodations	Zev's Assistant	
2019	The Social Ones	Rob	
2019	Hustlers	Man in Glasses	
2021	Here Today	Lenny	
2024	A New York Story	Comedian	

=== Television ===
Year	Title	Role	Notes
2013–2014	2nd Avenue	Anthony	3 episodes
2013–2015	Blue Bloods	Reporter No. 1	3 episodes
2014	Stalked: Someone's Watching	David Richards	Episode: "Married to Madness"
2014	An Actor Unprepared	Gianmarco	2 episodes
2014	Small Miracles	Dr. Dovid / Alex Metzger	2 episodes
2015	My Crazy Love	Avi	Episode: "Chanel and Jessica"
2015	Riding the D with Dr. Seeds	Colby the Boyfriend	Episode: "Relationship Advice"
2015	Deuce Police	Major Deegan	3 episodes
2015	What Would You Do?	Customer	Episode #10.4
2015	Hack My Life	Infomercial Pitchman	Episode: "Hackers Back in Action"
2015	The Queens Project	Jared	Episode: "Odd Wheel"
2015	A Crime to Remember	Robert George Irwin	Episode: "Such a Pretty Face"
2015	Bro Brunches	Ricky	5 episodes
2016	Unforgettable	Mike Wilcox	Episode: "Breathing Space"
2016	I Love You... But I Lied	Ian	Episode: "Dirty Talk"
2016	How to Be a Startup in 21 Days	Gary	Episode: "The Startup Coach"
2016–2017	Matza Pizza	Various roles	16 episodes; also writer and editor
2016–2019	Cruel Children	Various roles	4 episodes
2018	The Last O.G.	Drew	Episode: "Pilot"
2018	Deception	Cam	Episode: "Black Art"
2018	Bonding	Comedy Show Host / Sal	3 episodes
2018–2020	We the Internet TV	Various / Red Cloud	2 episodes
2020	Little Voice	Ed Kimmel	Episode: "I Will Survive"
2020	Karate Tortoise	Daddy Longlegs	Episode: "The Secret Police"
2023	Verified Stand-Up	Himself	
2025–2026	Game Changer	Himself	2 episodes; "Crowd Control", "Last Talent Standing"
2025–2026	Crowd Control	Himself	2 episodes; "Tiny Celebrity", "Hal Rose Said to Watch This Episode"
2026	Have I Got News for You	Himself	Season 4, Episode 7
2026	Parlor Room	Himself	Episode: "Can I Phone a Friend?"

=== Specials ===
Year	Title	Notes
2025	Thief of Joy	Self-released comedy special
2026	God Forbid	Netflix special

== Theater ==
Year	Title	Role	Venue	Notes	Ref.
2012	Spoon River Anthology	performer	Riverside Theatre, Off-Broadway		
2014	<50%	Gianmarco; also writer	Kraine Theater, Off-Off Broadway	Part of the New York International Fringe Festival	
2015	That Bachelorette Show	Giovanni Giovanni	42West, Off-Broadway		
2018	Less Than 50%	Gianmarco; also writer	59E59, Off-Broadway		
