= Don't Tell Comedy =

Live stand-up comedy company which creates pop-up comedy experiences across the U.S.

- Industry: Comedy
- Founded: 2017; 9 years ago
- Founder: Kyle Kazanjian-Amory
- Headquarters: Los Angeles, California
- Area served: Over 250 cities throughout the United States, Europe, Australia, Canada, and United Kingdom
- Key people: Kyle Kazanjian-Amory (CEO)
- Website: https://www.donttellcomedy.com

Don't Tell Comedy is a live stand-up comedy company that creates pop-up comedy shows in unique, non-traditional locations in over 250 cities worldwide, and films select shows to release stand-up comedy video content online. Founded in 2017, the company is based in Los Angeles, California.

== History ==
Founder Kyle Kazanjian-Amory wanted to create local stand-up shows that felt more casual than a comedy club and more professional than other local independent shows. The company first started producing shows in locations around Los Angeles before expanding to other cities, such as San Francisco, Portland, and Seattle.

In March 2020, Don't Tell Comedy had to cancel shows and stop running live events due to the coronavirus pandemic. The company began creating digital content and live-streamed events, including a trivia format and private corporate events.

As of 2024, the company has produced shows in more than 200 cities throughout the world, including Atlanta, Chicago, Columbus, OH, Denver, Las Vegas, London, Los Angeles, Miami, San Diego, San Francisco, Paris, Berlin, Melbourne, and others. Toronto, Washington D.C., and others.

== Shows ==
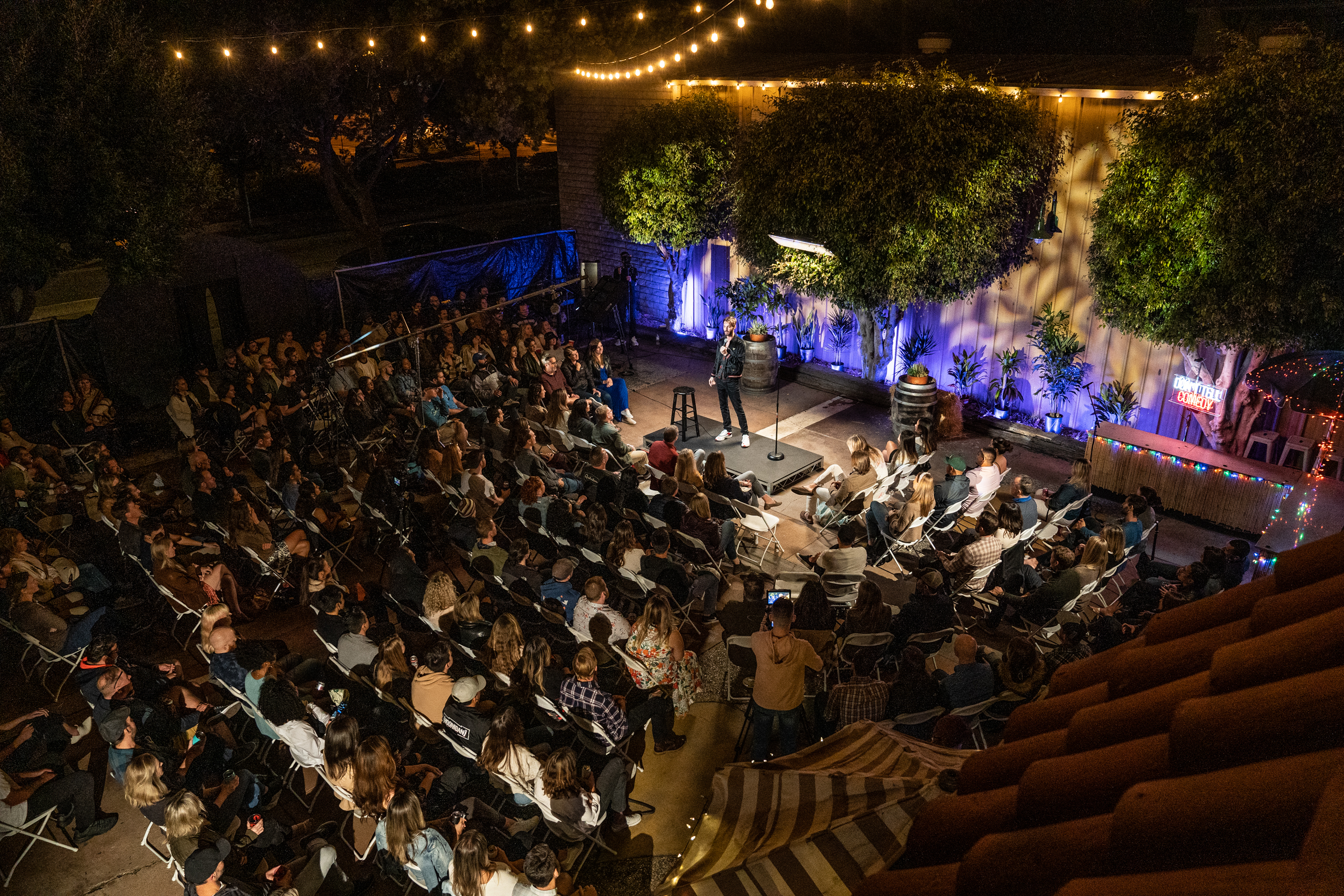
Daniel Webb performing at a Don't Tell Comedy show in November 2021

The typical Don't Tell Comedy show is held in a non-traditional venue with an average of five comedians, running for roughly 90 minutes. When selling tickets to events, only the date, time, and neighborhood are advertised. The specific location is later revealed on the day of the show. The final lineup is only known at the actual show.

Some shows have been filmed and posted to the Don't Tell Comedy YouTube channel.

== Digital Video ==
In early 2022, Don't Tell Comedy began releasing digital content on social platforms such as YouTube, Facebook, TikTok, and Instagram, highlighting lineups of emerging comedians across the United States including Ralph Barbosa and Andy Huggins. Other comedians who have released sets with Don't Tell Comedy include Fumi Abe, Katherine Blanford, Matt Braunger, Andrea Jin, Jay Jurden, Kyle Kinane, Leslie Liao, Michael Longfellow, Opeyemi Olagbaju, Lea’h Sampson, and Gianmarco Soresi.

Don't Tell Comedy produced their first Netflix special for Hannah Berner titled, We Ride At Dawn. The special that was filmed at The Fillmore in Philadelphia, PA, premiered on July 9, 2024. The special Decider noted as a "solid debut" landed in Netflix's Top 10 most popular shows category.

== Notable performers ==
Performer	Notability
Michael Che	Cast member of Saturday Night Live
Sam Jay	Writer for Saturday Night Live, co-star of PAUSE with Sam Jay
Iliza Shlesinger	2008 winner of NBC's Last Comic Standing, host of Excused and TBS game show Separation Anxiety, and known for her 2025 Prime Video special Iliza Shlesinger: A Different Animal.
Ali Wong	Best known for Netflix stand-up specials Baby Cobra, Hard Knock Wife, and Don Wong
Nikki Glaser	Host of Not Safe with Nikki Glaser
Bill Burr	Comedy Specials include: You People Are All the Same, I'm Sorry You Feel That Way, Walk Your Way Out and Paper Tiger.
