= List of The Tonight Show Starring Jimmy Fallon episodes (2022) =

- No. of episodes: 193

Release
- Original network: NBC
- Original release: January 3 – December 16, 2022

Season chronology
- ← Previous; 2021 episodes Next → 2023 episodes

This is the list of episodes for The Tonight Show Starring Jimmy Fallon in 2022.

== 2022 ==
=== January ===
No.	Original release date	Guest(s)	Musical/entertainment guest(s)
1575	January 3, 2022	Anthony Anderson, Adam Devine	Carly Pearce
Jimmy fulfills his New Year's resolution to say yes to everything in the cold open; CDC Guidelines Then & Now; Tonight Show Sponsors; Tonight Show Screengrabs; Carly Pearce performed "Diamondback"
1576	January 4, 2022	Milo Ventimiglia, Sabrina Carpenter	Yola
Marjorie Taylor Greene Social Media Posts; Steve Higgins tries to use his BlackBerry phone; the cue card guy quits (parody of Antonio Brown); Tonight Show News & Improved; Yola performed "Dancing Away in Tears"
1577	January 5, 2022	Cate Blanchett, Nate Bargatze	GAYLE
Tiny Song; Tonight Show #hashtags: #MyResolutionInSixWords; Hey Robot... (Cate Blanchett); Jimmy does a plank; GAYLE performed "abcdefu"
1578	January 6, 2022	Kenan Thompson, Elle Fanning	Terrace Martin featuring Ann Ray and Smino
Tonight Show News Radio; Tonight Show Slideshow Songs (Kenan Thompson); Terrace Martin featuring Ann Ray and Smino performed "This Morning"
1579	January 7, 2022	The co-hosts of Queer Eye, J. B. Smoove	Matthew Broussard
Jimmy and Questlove remove the Christmas tree in 30 Rockefeller Plaza in the cold open; COVID Test Breakdown; Thank You Notes; Tonight Show Search Party (the co-hosts of Queer Eye Vs. Jimmy Fallon, J. B. Smoove & The Roots)
1580	January 10, 2022	John Cena, Bridget Everett, Cordae	Cordae
Tonight Show Good Name Bad Name Great Name; Tonight Show Make It Last (John Cena); Cordae performed "Sinister/Chronicles"
1581	January 11, 2022	Maggie Gyllenhaal, Jacob Elordi	Raanan Hershberg
Let's Get Siri–ous; Tonight Show Pros and Cons; Tonight Show Random Instrument Challenge (Maggie Gyllenhaal); Maggie Gyllenhaal plays the theremin
1582	January 12, 2022	Sarah Silverman, Lewis Black	Fontaines D.C.
Donald Trump Phone Call Audio; Oscar Host Audition Tapes; Tonight Show Polls; Tonight Show Battle of the Instant Songwriters; Tonight Show Wheel of Opinions (Lewis Black); Fontaines D.C. performed "Jackie Down the Line"
1583	January 13, 2022	Willem Dafoe, Ariana DeBose	The Lumineers
Wordle; Tonight Show #hashtags: #MyWorstCar; The Lumineers performed "Where We Are"
1584	January 14, 2022	John Goodman, Cecily Strong	Jordan Davis
Football Fan Signs; Jimmy counts down the top/bottom songs on the charts; Thank You Notes; Jordan Davis performed "Buy Dirt"
1585	January 17, 2022	Javier Bardem, Daveed Diggs	Robert Glasper
Nyquil Chicken Recipe; Tonight Show Amazon Reviews; Tonight Show Why Is Your Pet Better Than Me?; Robert Glasper performed "In Tune/Black Superhero"
1586	January 18, 2022	Ricky Gervais, Maude Apatow	Kaytranada featuring H.E.R.
Tonight Show #hashtags: #DescribeAMovieBadly; Tonight Show Ricky Gervais Settles It (Ricky Gervais); Kaytranada featuring H.E.R. performed "Intimidated"
1587	January 19, 2022	Jessica Chastain, Ralph Macchio	The Winner of Clash of the Cover Bands
Tonight Show Popular Mathematics; Tonight Show Audience Suggestion Box (Ozark with a laugh track, Scrambler, every streaming service startup screen at the same time, the show in black and white, Jimmy shows what the three buttons on his desk do); The Winner of Clash of the Cover Bands performed a medley of Dolly Parton songs
1588	January 20, 2022	Will Forte, Jennifer Coolidge	Gunna
Biden/Harris 2024 Campaign Slogans; Joe Biden Presidency 1st Anniversary Celebration Texts; Tonight Show Freezer Secrets (Will Forte); Will Forte brings a signed Saturday Night Live book; Gunna performed "Empire"
1589	January 21, 2022	Gwyneth Paltrow, Maddie Ziegler	Sean Donnelly
Thank You Notes; Tonight Show One Word Songs (Gwyneth Paltrow)
1590	January 24, 2022	Tiffany Haddish, Paris Hilton	Earl Sweatshirt
Steve Higgins and Jimmy argue over blood donor deals; Tonight Show Bad Signs; Tonight Show Life Coach with Paris & Kathy Hilton (Paris & Kathy Hilton); Earl Sweatshirt performed "2010"
1591	January 25, 2022	Jamie Dornan, Nicole Byer	Imagine Dragons
Tonight Show Pros and Cons; Tonight Show Do Not Read; Imagine Dragons performed "Enemy"
1592	January 26, 2022	Halle Berry, Dave Franco, Henrik Lundqvist	Dijon
Congressmen/women Quotes; Tonight Show News & Improved; Tonight Show Emotional Interview (Halle Berry); Dijon performed "Big Mike's"
1593	January 27, 2022	Kevin James, Ilana Glazer, Chef Jacques Pépin	N/A
Tonight Show News Smash; Tonight Show Sponsors; Tonight Show #hashtags: #MyHighSchoolWasWeird; Kevin James and Jimmy have a comedic sparring match
1594	January 28, 2022	Lin-Manuel Miranda, Taylor Lautner, Chloe Kim	Griff x Sigrid
Thank You Notes; Tonight Show One Second Disney Songs (Lin-Manuel Miranda); Griff x Sigrid performed "Head on Fire"
1595	January 31, 2022	Peyton Manning, Tariq Trotter, Anitta	Anitta
Tariq is upset about things being recalled; Puppy Predictors: Super Bowl LVI Edition; Tariq speed raps; Anitta performed "Boys Don't Cry"

=== February ===
No.	Original release date	Guest(s)	Musical/entertainment guest(s)
1596	February 1, 2022	Liam Neeson, Jenny Slate	Joshua Ray Walker
Tiny Song; Fast & Furious 10: Norwegian Cruise Line Trailer; Tonight Show Pros and Cons; Tonight Showbotics; Liam Neeson brings Jimmy a gift; Joshua Ray Walker performed "Sexy After Dark"
1597	February 2, 2022	Maluma, Janet Jackson, Julia Garner	Kamasi Washington
Tonight Show Icebreakers: Winter Olympics Edition; Maluma bounces a soccer ball on his head; Kamasi Washington performed "The Garden Path"
1598	February 4, 2022	Jennifer Lopez, Stephen & Ayesha Curry	Jennifer Lopez & Maluma
Olympics Sports Logos; Doubles Luge; Thank You Notes; Tonight Show Wedding, Set, Go! (Jennifer Lopez); Jennifer Lopez & Maluma performed "Marry Me"
1599	February 21, 2022	Ben Stiller, Laverne Cox	Muni Long
Tonight Show Pros and Cons; Tonight Show True Confessions (Ben Stiller, Laverne Cox); Muni Long performed "Hrs and Hrs"
1600	February 22, 2022	James Spader, Nathan Chen, Dr. Bernice King	Eric Neumann
Viagra Slogans; Tonight Show Good Name Bad Name Great Name; Tonight Show Do Not Play; James Spader brings and discusses a 1958 vinyl record of Mother Goose that terrified him as a child, and then listen to Boris Karloff reading "There Was a Crooked Man"; Nathan Chen shows Jimmy a skating jump
1601	February 23, 2022	Tracee Ellis Ross, Jabari Banks	Koffee
Jurassic World Dominion Fake Trailer; Tonight Show News & Improved; Tonight Show Show Me Something Good; Tonight Show Sing It Like (Tracee Ellis Ross); Koffee performed "Pull Up"
1602	February 24, 2022	Gordon Ramsay, Dominic Fike	Dominic Fike
Hard Mountain Dew Slogans; Tiny Song; Tonight Show #hashtags: #AddAWordRuinABook; Tonight Show Gordon Ramsay Settles It (Gordon Ramsay); Gordon Ramsay critiques Jimmy eating a sandwich; Is There a 'Stache Under That Mask?; Dominic Fike performed "Babydoll"
1603	February 25, 2022	Uma Thurman, Deion Sanders	Liam Gallagher
Law & Order Updated Opening; Lost The Price Is Right Contestant; Tonight Show Polls; Thank You Notes; Liam Gallagher performed "Everything's Electric"
1604	February 28, 2022	Kate McKinnon, Paul Dano	YG featuring Moneybagg Yo
Papa John's Pizza Ad; Tonight Show Popular Mathematics; Jimmy counts down the top/bottom songs on the charts; Hey Robot... (Kate McKinnon); YG featuring Moneybagg Yo performed "Scared Money"

=== March ===
No.	Original release date	Guest(s)	Musical/entertainment guest(s)
1605	March 1, 2022	Greg Kinnear, Daisy Edgar-Jones	Jim James
Greg Kinnear visits Jimmy in his dressing room at the top of the program; Jimmy promotes World Central Kitchen; Tonight Show Pros and Cons; Tonight Show Battle of the Instant Songwriters; Jimmy gives Daisy Edgar-Jones a basket of UK snack chips and they sample Girl Scout Cookies; Jim James performed "In Color"
1606	March 2, 2022	Zoë Kravitz, Al Franken	Sebastián Yatra
Jimmy celebrates his thirteen years as a late night host with the debut of Late Night with Jimmy Fallon; State of the Union Reactions; Tonight Show Can You Feel It? (Zoë Kravitz); Sebastián Yatra performed "Tacones Rojos"
1607	March 3, 2022	Dua Lipa, Sam Heughan	Band of Horses
So You Think You Can Dance Ad; Tonight Show #hashtags: #MyDumbSuperpower; Dua Lipa shows Jimmy a dance move; Dua Lipa surprises one of her biggest fans; the crew does their best Batman impression; Band of Horses performed "Crutch"
1608	March 4, 2022	Drew Barrymore, Charli XCX	The Head and the Heart
Jimmy shows off his new boots; Thank You Notes; Pictionary (Questlove & Charli XCX Vs. Jimmy Fallon & Drew Barrymore); Charli XCX and Jimmy go through some specific songs when discussing her podcast Best Song Ever; The Head and the Heart performed "Virginia (Wind in the Night)"
1609	March 7, 2022	Renée Zellweger, David Byrne	David Byrne's American Utopia
Tonight Show Sponsors; Tonight Show Jinx (Renée Zellweger & Jimmy Fallon Vs. Tariq & David Byrne); David Byrne's American Utopia performed "Like Humans Do"
1610	March 8, 2022	Alicia Keys, Zoey Deutch	EarthGang
Jimmy signs a joke card from the monologue and gives it to an audience member; Let's Get Siri–ous; Politicians After Reverse Aging; Tonight Show Pros and Cons; GE Tonight Show Fallonventions: Kid's Inventions; Zoey Deutch challenges Jimmy to define advanced Yiddish words; EarthGang performed "Lie to Me"
1611	March 9, 2022	Samuel L. Jackson, Rupert Grint	Wet Leg
Jimmy, Tariq and Steve Higgins' Inner Thoughts; Tonight Show #hashtags: #SpringBreakInSixWords; Freestylin' with The Roots; Samuel L. Jackson squashes internet rumors; Wet Leg performed "Wet Dream"
1612	March 10, 2022	Naomi Watts, Rosalía	Omar Apollo
Tariq is upset about things being recalled; Statue Quotes; Tonight Show Screengrabs; Naomi Watts and Jimmy make pottery; Spooky Spider; Rosalía shows Jimmy a failed text exchange from Harry Styles; Omar Apollo performed "Killing Me"
1613	March 11, 2022	Heidi Klum, Noah Schnapp	Nilüfer Yanya
Mucinex Ad; Thank You Notes; March Madness Mascot Mayhem; Heidi Klum teaches Jimmy dance moves; Tonight Show Auto–Tune Up (Heidi Klum); Nilüfer Yanya performed "Midnight Sun"
1614	March 14, 2022	Marisa Tomei, Jon Glaser	Mae Muller
Questlove brings his newly-won BAFTA Award; Tonight Show What's Up Dog?; Marisa Tomei and Jimmy have sandwiches; Jimmy cuts Jon Glaser's hair; Mae Muller performed "Better Days"
1615	March 15, 2022	Seth Meyers, Camille Cottin	Lil Durk featuring Future
Sister Jean Quotes; Let's Get Siri–ous; Tonight Show WeTweet; Tonight Show Rap Remix; Lil Durk featuring Future performed "Petty Too/Ahhh Ha"
1616	March 16, 2022	Amy Schumer, Denis Villeneuve, Christina Tosi	N/A
Tonight Show Pros and Cons; Tonight Show Audience Suggestion Box (Hashtag the Panda gives out free artichokes to the audience, Seth Rollins stomps on a leprechaun, Jimmy does a trick shot, The Ragtime Gals perform to motivate plants, the cast of Riverdance perform)
1617	March 17, 2022	Billy Crystal, Emilia Jones	Normani
Tiny Song; Tonight Show News & Improved; Billy Crystal and Jimmy do a sketch where they do impressions while getting COVID boosters; Normani performed "Fair"
1618	March 18, 2022	Daniel Radcliffe, KiKi Layne	Dave Gahan and Soulsavers
Jimmy announces his new children's book; Thank You Notes; Tonight Show Cold As Ice (Daniel Radcliffe); Dave Gahan and Soulsavers performed "The Desperate Kingdom of Love"
1619	March 21, 2022	Leslie Mann, Mikey Day	Kae Tempest
Jimmy talks to Mikey Day in his dressing room at the top of the program; Jimmy talks about Maury ending after 31 years and participates in a recreation sketch with Tariq and Steve Higgins; Charades (Mikey Day & Questlove Vs. Jimmy Fallon & Leslie Mann); Mikey Day discusses Is It Cake? and having an awkward interaction with Steven Spielberg on Saturday Night Live; Kae Tempest performed "More Pressure/Grace"
1620	March 22, 2022	Savannah Guthrie & Hoda Kotb, Lily Collins	Brothers Osborne
Politician's Questions; Tonight Show Pros and Cons; Tonight Show WeTweet; Savannah Guthrie & Hoda Kotb play guitar; Brothers Osborne performed "Headstone"
1621	March 23, 2022	Joe Jonas, Gabriel Iglesias	Wolf Alice
Tariq is upset about things being recalled; Tonight Show TikTok Duets (Joe Jonas); Joe Jonas performed "All Star"; Gabriel Iglesias debuts his own Funko Pop; Wolf Alice performed "The Last Man on Earth"
1622	March 24, 2022	Ethan Hawke, Jim Jefferies	Yard Act
Airline Statements; Tonight Show #hashtags: #BadMovieSequels; Tonight Show Go On, Git!; Yard Act performed "The Overload"
1623	March 25, 2022	Desus & Mero, Maren Morris	Maren Morris
Jimmy catches Desus & Mero betting on Bridgerton at the top of the program; 94th Academy Awards Promo; Thank You Notes; Random Object Shootout (Desus & Mero); Maren Morris performed "Circles Around This Town"
1624	March 28, 2022	John Oliver, Lana Condor, Questlove	Buddy featuring Blxst
Jimmy kicks off Nana Week spotlighting grandmothers; Questlove brings out his Academy Award for Best Documentary Feature; Buddy featuring Blxst performed "Wait Too Long"
1625	March 29, 2022	Jared Leto, Stephen Merchant	Taylor Tomlinson
CNN+ Slogans; Nana Week continues; Let Us Play with Your Look (with Jared Leto)
1626	March 30, 2022	Hasan Minhaj, Roman Reigns	Mimi Webb
Jimmy meets with Jared Leto in his dressing room from the prior night; Nana Week continues; Hey Robot... (Hasan Minhaj); Mimi Webb performed "House on Fire"
1627	March 31, 2022	Sienna Miller, Judd Apatow	Big Thief
Congressmen/women Quotes; Tonight Show #hashtags: #NanaQuotes; Nana Week continues; Puppy Predictors: 2022 Final Four Edition; Big Thief performed "Spud Infinity"

=== April ===
No.	Original release date	Guest(s)	Musical/entertainment guest(s)
1628	April 1, 2022	Hugh Jackman, Bridget Everett	Red Hot Chili Peppers
Jimmy Kimmel guest hosts the broadcast for April Fools' Day, and Jimmy Fallon guest hosts Jimmy Kimmel Live!; Kimmel and Fallon check in with each other, revealing that they had been planning this for two years; Fallon and Kimmel do a pre-recorded bit where they go through how many times they have been mistaken for each other, and they call David Letterman; Thank You Notes; Kimmel shows a pair of gifts to Hugh Jackman from Ryan Reynolds; Box of Lies (Hugh Jackman); Red Hot Chili Peppers performed "Black Summer" on The Tonight Show and "These Are the Ways" on Jimmy Kimmel Live! across both feeds of The Tonight Show and Jimmy Kimmel Live!
1629	April 4, 2022	Joe Scarborough & Mika Brzezinski, Alison Brie, Kevin & Danielle Jonas	Coi Leray
Jimmy shows behind-the-scenes footage of his hosting Jimmy Kimmel Live!; Tonight Show Do Not Play; Coi Leray performed a medley of songs
1630	April 5, 2022	Amanda Seyfried, Jonathan Groff	Emil Wakim
C-SPAN Schedule; Tonight Show Sponsors; Tonight Show WeTweet; Amanda Seyfried does the robot; Tonight Show Whisper Challenge (Amanda Seyfried); Jonathan Groff performed for the audience
1631	April 6, 2022	Eddie Redmayne, Patricia Arquette	Rauw Alejandro
Tonight Show Pros and Cons; Jimmy performed "Edit Tweet"; Eddie Redmayne teaches Jimmy creature movement from Fantastic Beasts: The Secrets of Dumbledore; Tonight Show Know Your Role (Eddie Redmayne); Rauw Alejandro performed "MUSEO/Desperados"
1632	April 7, 2022	Michelle Pfeiffer, Jessica Williams	Latto
Ken Burns Benjamin Franklin Documentary Parody; Tonight Show News Radio; Tonight Show #hashtags: #SpringRaps; Latto performed "Sunshine/Big Energy"
1633	April 8, 2022	Camila Cabello, Stephen A. Smith	Cody Johnson
Joe Biden footage (Jimmy impersonates Biden); Thank You Notes; Tonight Show Wheel of Opinions (Stephen A. Smith); Cody Johnson performed "Till I Can't"
1634	April 18, 2022	Sam Rockwell, Pamela Adlon	Gang of Youths
Tonight Show Polls; Tonight Show Bad Signs; Gang of Youths performed "In the Wake of Your Leave"
1635	April 19, 2022	Aaron Paul, Marc Maron, Tyler "Ninja" Blevins	Leikeli47
Emmanuel Macron Campaign Slogans; Tonight Show WeTweet; Leikeli47 performed "Chitty Bang"
1636	April 20, 2022	Marlon Wayans, Natasha Lyonne	Dove Cameron
Netflix Series; Emmanuel Macron performed a campaign song (Jimmy portrays Macron); Tonight Show True Confessions (Marlon Wayans, Natasha Lyonne); Dove Cameron performed "Boyfriend"
1637	April 21, 2022	Ice-T, Betty Gilpin	Pusha T
The waitstaff from the Times Square Applebee's sing "Happy Birthday to You" to Elizabeth II; Tonight Show #hashtags: #RejectedSuperheroes; Tonight Show Ice-T Settles It (Ice-T); Pusha T performed "Dreamin of the Past"
1638	April 22, 2022	Jason Bateman, Pusha T	Justine Skye
Is There a 'Stache Under That Mask?; Thank You Notes; Justine Skye performed "What a Lie"
1639	April 25, 2022	Chrissy Teigen, Cristin Milioti	Soccer Mommy
Tonight Show Popular Mathematics; Tonight Show Press & Guess (Chrissy Teigen); Soccer Mommy performed "Shotgun"
1640	April 26, 2022	Elisabeth Moss, Rhett & Link	Lauv
Tonight Show WeTweet; Elisabeth Moss and Jimmy have hot dogs; Secret Ingredient (Rhett & Link); Lauv performed "All 4 Nothing (I'm So in Love)"
1641	April 27, 2022	David Spade, Quinta Brunson, Chef Daniel Humm	Lucky Daye
Astronaut Quotes; Tonight Show Pros and Cons; Lucky Daye performed "Over"
1642	April 28, 2022	Christina Ricci, Diplo	Diplo & Miguel
Tonight Show News Smash; Avatar: The Way of Water Alternate Titles; Tonight Show #hashtags: #MyBigBusinessIdea; Is There a 'Stache Under That Mask?; Diplo & Miguel performed "Don't Forget My Love"
1643	April 29, 2022	Shawn Mendes, Jesse Tyler Ferguson	Shawn Mendes
Shawn Mendes co-hosts the broadcast; Thank You Notes; Egg Russian Roulette (Shawn Mendes); Shawn Mendes interviews Jimmy; Shawn Mendes performed "When You're Gone"

=== May ===
No.	Original release date	Guest(s)	Musical/entertainment guest(s)
1644	May 2, 2022	Norman Reedus, Paula Pell, Beeple	The Linda Lindas
Beeple makes a surprise appearance during the monologue; Freestylin' with The Roots; The Linda Lindas performed "Oh!"; Beeple debuts an art piece at the end of the broadcast
1645	May 3, 2022	Benedict Cumberbatch, Sydney Sweeney	Father John Misty
Tonight Show Mother's Day Surprise: Teacher Edition; Charades (Jimmy Fallon & Sydney Sweeney Vs. Benedict Cumberbatch & Tariq); Benedict Cumberbatch teaches Jimmy Doctor Strange hand gestures; Father John Misty performed "Kiss Me (I Loved You)"
1646	May 4, 2022	Elizabeth Olsen, Willie Geist	Norah Jones
Jimmy pays tribute to different kinds of teachers; Tonight Show Pros and Cons; Tonight Show Battle of the Instant Songwriters; Norah Jones performed "Don't Know Why"
1647	May 5, 2022	Chris Pratt, Benedict Wong	Ingrid Andress
Cinco de Mayo Ad; Tariq makes tacos; Tonight Show #hashtags: #MomQuotes; Tonight Show Face It Challenge (Chris Pratt); Ingrid Andress performed "Good Person"
1648	May 6, 2022	Sophie Turner, Tom Pelphrey	Moses Storm
Thank You Notes; Puppy Predictors: 2022 Kentucky Derby Edition; Sophie Turner teaches Jimmy the Yay or Nay game
1649	May 9, 2022	Rachel Brosnahan, Jack Harlow	Jack Harlow
Tonight Show Sponsors; Tonight Show Virtual Reality Pictionary (Rachel Brosnahan & Jimmy Fallon Vs. Tariq & Jack Harlow); Jack Harlow performed "First Class"
1650	May 10, 2022	Mandy Moore, The Kids in the Hall	Mandy Moore
Tariq is upset about things being recalled; Tonight Show Pros and Cons; Tonight Show WeTweet; Mandy Moore performed "In Real Life"
1651	May 11, 2022	Florence Welch, Jimmy Buffett	Florence and the Machine
Protest Signs; Tonight Show Audience Suggestion Box (the crew tries to start of fire with their minds, sneaker screeches made into a song, Doctor Strange gives someone a medical diagnosis, Jimmy Buffett performed "Margaritaville", Top Gun: Maverick toned down for children, Jimmy is in The Twilight Zone, Florence Welch performed "Margaritaville"); Florence and the Machine performed "My Love"
1652	May 12, 2022	Post Malone, Howie Mandel	Arcade Fire
Party City Board Meeting; Wine Vintner Quotes; Jimmy goes through Taylor Swift's clues about her upcoming release; Tonight Show Point Turn Sip (Post Malone); Arcade Fire performed "Rabbit Hole"
1653	May 13, 2022	Millie Bobby Brown	Snail Mail
Elon Musk/Jack Dorsey Statements; Mall Commercial; Google Language Translator Glasses; the crew does Christopher Walken impressions; Thank You Notes; Box of Lies (Millie Bobby Brown); Millie Bobby Brown and Jimmy challenge each other on who can eat Fruit Roll-Ups faster; Is There a 'Stache Under That Mask?; Snail Mail performed "Glory"
1654	May 16, 2022	Shakira, Michelle Dockery	T. Murph
Trump with No Context; Tonight Show Pros and Cons; Tonight Show Watch–It–Once TikTok Challenge (Shakira)
1655	May 17, 2022	Nick Jonas, Mary Lynn Rajskub	Ella Mai
90 Day Fiancé Spin–Offs Promo; Music Band Promises; Jimmy cancels his phone plan; Tonight Show WeTweet; Tonight Show Auto Tune–Up (Nick Jonas); Nick Jonas brings his friend's brand of popcorn; Ella Mai performed "DFMU/Leave You Alone"
1656	May 18, 2022	Tim McGraw, Maisie Williams	Doechii
Sound Advice from Steve Mandel; Tonight Show Polls; Tonight Show Do Not Play; Doechii performed "Persuasive/Crazy"
1657	May 19, 2022	Kenan Thompson, JoJo Siwa	Rina Sawayama
TJ Maxx Ad; George W. Bush: Still Got It!; Tariq is upset about graduations and Father's Day coinciding; Sound Advice from Steve Mandel; Domino's Tracker; Tonight Show #hashtags: #MyWorstCar; Saugerties High School (Kenan Thompson, JoJo Siwa); Rina Sawayama performed "This Hell"
1658	May 20, 2022	Fred Armisen, Chloë Sevigny, Michelle Zauner	Måneskin
The crew leaves to go to a Harry Styles concert; Applebee's Commercial; Abe Lincoln: Hulk Ad; Jimmy skips over boring parts of TikTok videos; Patrick Hannigan; Tonight Show Guess the Harry Styles Song; Tonight Show Freezer Secrets (Fred Armisen); Fred Armisen peaks around the corner; Fred Armisen plays guitar; Michelle Zauner and Jimmy have hot dogs; Måneskin performed "Supermodel" with Jimmy filling in for the absent bass player
1659	May 23, 2022	Rachel Dratch, Sadie Sink	Turnstile
Joe Biden audio of him at a meeting in Asia (Jimmy portrays Biden); Restaurant Call Center Greetings; Steve Higgins impulse buys; Kool-Aid Man interview; Google Searches; Bottom of the Charts; Password (Rachel Dratch & Jimmy Fallon Vs. Sadie Sink & Questlove); Turnstile performed "Blackout"
1660	May 24, 2022	Ewan McGregor, Annie Murphy	Jackie Fabulous
Senator Quotes; Gatorade Ad; Russian Car Manufacturer Ad; Tonight Show WeTweet; "Junk in the Frunk"; Jimmy asks Ewan McGregor Obi-Wan Kenobi questions
1661	May 25, 2022	Jon Hamm, Jen Psaki, Jimmie Johnson	N/A
Snack Mashups; Jimmy skips over the boring parts of TikTok videos; Vin Diesel Car Commercial; Tonight Show #hashtags: #AddAWordRuinAMovie; Burlap performance (Jon Hamm); Jimmie Johnson's daughter brings out his helmet
1662	May 26, 2022	Colson Baker, Harry Kane	Lainey Wilson
Servicemen/women make up the audience for Fleet Week; a member of the Space Force speaks with Jimmy from the audience; Tariq wants a Star Wars series focusing on Obi-Wan Kenobi's family; Tonight Show Kid Advice (Channing Tatum); Tonight Show Stranger Things Recap (with the cast of Stranger Things); Tonight Show Mad Lib Theater (Colson Baker); Harry Kane and Jimmy play mini foosball; Lainey Wilson performed "Heart Like a Truck"
1663	May 27, 2022	Josh Charles, Bashir Salahuddin	OneRepublic
Mountain Dew Flamin' Hot Super Bowl Ad; Jimmy is disguised in the audience; Fish Reactions; Thank You Notes; Tonight Show Hot Dog Off; Josh Charles brings a snowball ice maker; OneRepublic performed "I Ain't Worried"

=== June ===
No.	Original release date	Guest(s)	Musical/entertainment guest(s)
1664	June 6, 2022	Adam Sandler, Ben Falcone	Nimesh Patel
MSNBC News Alert; Steve Higgins mispronounces actors' names; Tonight Show Good Name Bad Name Great Name; Tonight Show Shreddy or Not
1665	June 7, 2022	Melissa McCarthy, Henry Winkler, Iman Vellani	Marcus King
COVID Rapid At–Home Test Instructions; Politician Issues; Panera Bread Ad; Tonight Show WeTweet; What's Behind Me? (Melissa McCarthy); Marcus King performed "Hard Workin' Man"
1666	June 8, 2022	Jeff Goldblum, Bowen Yang	Miranda Lambert
Amazon the Mall Ad; Tonight Show Sponsors; the crew reads fake letters to their mothers from camp; Jeff Goldblum shows Jimmy a runway walk; Jeff Goldblum plays piano; Miranda Lambert performed "Actin' Up"
1667	June 9, 2022	Demi Lovato, Jay Pharoah	Demi Lovato
Tariq has multiple holiday jobs; Tonight Show #hashtags: #WorstSummerJob; Demi Lovato gives Jimmy an image of the Holy Fvck album cover with his face on it; Jimmy comes up with song titles for Demi Lovato; Demi Lovato performed "Skin of My Teeth"
1668	June 10, 2022	The Weirdos & Chris Martin, Bryce Dallas Howard	The Weirdos featuring Chris Martin
Nathan Bishop, Cynthia Watson & Ted Bratson; The Wizard of Oz Clip; Beefalo DNA Results; Thank You Notes; Tonight Show Whisper Challenge (Bryce Dallas Howard); The Weirdos featuring Chris Martin performed "Beautiful"
1669	June 13, 2022	Halsey, Larry Wilmore	MUNA
National Weather Service Meeting (Tariq & Jimmy Fallon); Vkusno & Tochka Ad; Jimmy speculates on Beyoncé's new album; Tonight Show News & Improved; Tonight Show Best Friends Challenge (Halsey); MUNA performed "Kind of Girl"
1670	June 14, 2022	Dakota Johnson, Adam Scott	Carrie Underwood
Tariq performed an original song to prevent Jimmy from telling a joke; Tonight Show WeTweet; Tonight Show Mad Lib Karaoke (Dakota Johnson); Carrie Underwood performed "Pink Champagne"
1671	June 15, 2022	Hailey Bieber, Austin Butler, Stephen "tWitch" Boss	Phoebe Bridgers
Joe Biden Ad; Internet Explorer Errors; Tonight Show Popular Mathematics; Austin Butler does Elvis Presley impression and teaches Jimmy Presley's dance moves; Stephen "tWitch" Boss teaches Jimmy dance moves; Phoebe Bridgers performed "Sidelines"
1672	June 16, 2022	John Lithgow, Noah Schnapp	070 Shake
Bush Gardens VIP Tour Ad; Tonight Show Hollywood Pop Corner; Jimmy and Keke Palmer go to the DiscOasis Center in Central Park; Noah Schnapp and Jimmy wear wigs; Hey Robot... (Noah Schnapp); 070 Shake performed "Skin and Bones"
1673	June 17, 2022	Tracee Ellis Ross, Sara Bareilles	D.J. Demers
Tonight Show News Smash; Kingsford Ad; Steve Mandel's Rant Zone; Jimmy can't afford the rights to perform "Let It Be" for Paul McCartney's 80th birthday; Jimmy lists off things he loves; Thank You Notes
1674	June 20, 2022	Kareem Abdul-Jabbar, Kristen Bell	Coast Contra
Trump with No Context; Fast X Fake Trailer; Jimmy shares some relaxing thoughts; Tonight Show Polls; Tonight Show Kareem Abdul-Jabbar Settles It (Kareem Abdul-Jabbar); Coast Contra performed "Never Freestyle/Legacy"
1675	June 21, 2022	Kim Kardashian, Hannah Einbinder, Mo Willems	Paris Jackson
Jimmy meets with Kim Kardashian in her dressing room at the top of the program; Sesame Street Clip; Tonight Show WeTweet; Jimmy tries Kim Kardashian's new skincare line; Paris Jackson performed "lighthouse"
1676	June 22, 2022	Maya Rudolph, Emma Chamberlain	Brett Eldredge
Joe Biden Audio (Jimmy portrays Biden); Rob Gronkowski Quotes; NBC's COVID Compliance and HR Department denies the Tonight Show Kiss Cam bit; Tariq is upset about things being recalled; Tonight Show Audience Suggestion Box (news stories with Snapchat filter, 90 Day Fiancé recap by Tariq, Joker clip added with singing, the crew reveal their favorite ice cream flavors, Maya Rudolph performed "Never Gonna Give You Up"; Black Simon & Garfunkel performed "My Money Don't Jiggle Jiggle", Jalen Williams fires an onion ring into a hockey goal guarded by Riddle); Emma Chamberlain brings her new coffee brand; Brett Eldredge performed "Holy Water"
1677	June 23, 2022	Evan Rachel Wood, Harry Smith, Chris Hemsworth	Conan Gray
FedEx Commercial; Jimmy skips over the boring parts of TikTok videos; Thor: Little Known Facts (Chris Hemsworth); Catchphrase (Tariq & Evan Rachel Wood Vs. Jimmy Fallon & Conan Gray); Evan Rachel Wood impersonates Madonna, Alanis Morissette and Janis Joplin, performing "Material Girl", "You Oughta Know" and "Piece of My Heart"; Conan Gray performed "Disaster"
1678	June 24, 2022	Julie Andrews, Hayden Christensen	Preacher Lawson
Notice at the top of the program that the broadcast was taped before the overturning of Roe v. Wade; Tariq has taken a hair-growing drug; Tonight Show You Pick the Joke; Jimmy counts down the top/bottom songs on the charts; Thank You Notes
1679	June 27, 2022	Martin Lawrence, Michaela Jaé Rodriguez	A Strange Loop
Supreme Court of the United States Message; Poll Questions; Elvis Promo; Tonight Show Barista Confessions (Emma Chamberlain); Tonight Show Battle of the Instant Songwriters; A Strange Loop performed "Intermission Song"
1680	June 28, 2022	Steve Carell, Maya Hawke, GIVĒON	GIVĒON
Tariq fills in for Steve Higgins as announcer; CPA Exam Answers; Lowe's Ad; the crew take stress tests; Stranger Things Ad; Tonight Show WeTweet; Tonight Show Go On, Git! (with Steve Carell); GIVĒON performed "Lie Again"
1681	June 29, 2022	Elizabeth Olsen, Gaten Matarazzo	Samantha Ruddy
Mark Normand fills in for Steve Higgins as announcer; Trump Magic Eraser Ad; Jimmy shares home road trip tips; Whole Foods Ad; Back to the Future: The Musical Sneak Peek; Tonight Show #hashtags: #SummerRaps; Charades (Jimmy Fallon & Gaten Matarazzo Vs. Tariq & Elizabeth Olsen)
1682	June 30, 2022	Ariana DeBose, Dorinda Medley	Dan White
Jimmy meets with Dorinda Medley in her dressing room at the top of the program; Dorinda Medley fills in for Steve Higgins as announcer; Tariq makes apple pie; Power Wheels Commercial; Tennis Coach Advice Audio; Vecna TikTok; Tonight Show Singing Whisper Challenge (Ariana DeBose)

=== July ===
No.	Original release date	Guest(s)	Musical/entertainment guest(s)
1683	July 18, 2022	Jane Fonda, Joe Keery	Alex G
Tariq comments on Ben Affleck and Jennifer Lopez' wedding; Skittles Ad; Wordle: The Party Game Instructions; Tonight Show Sponsors; Jimmy announces his new brand of sneakers; Egg Russian Roulette (Jane Fonda); Alex G performed "Runner"
1684	July 19, 2022	Michael Cera, Keke Palmer	Simon Taylor
Steve Higgins beats the heat; Jimmy lists off his favorite The Bachelorette contestants; Jimmy, Questlove and Tariq re-enact a scene from The Bachelorette; Whitman's Sampler Ad; Tonight Show WeTweet; Password (Jimmy Fallon & Michael Cera Vs. Questlove & Keke Palmer); Michael Cera brings Jimmy a gift for the show
1685	July 20, 2022	Daniel Kaluuya, Sarah Hyland	Denzel Curry
New audience admittance procedure to relieve heatstroke; Tom's Deodorant Ad; Apple Inc. Costumer Statement; Joe Biden Audio (Jimmy portrays Biden); Tonight Show Book Club; Tonight Show #hashtags: #SummerBod; Tonight Show Jump Scare Challenge (Daniel Kaluuya); Denzel Curry performed "Walkin"
1686	July 21, 2022	Ryan Gosling, Gugu Mbatha-Raw	Pete Lee
Weekend Weather Forecast; Tips to Beat the Heat News Broadcast; Shark Week Promo; Emmanuel the emu interrupts the monologue (special appearance by the animal trainer); Guess the Beyoncé Song; Thank You Notes; Tough Cop Tough Cop (Ryan Gosling)
1687	July 25, 2022	Kevin Hart, Joseph Quinn	Toro y Moi
Alaska Airlines Pilot Argument Audio; Jimmy skips over the boring parts of TikTok videos; Mega Millions Jackpot Announcer Audio; Tonight Show Good Name Bad Name Great Name; Joseph Quinn brings Jimmy a t-shirt; Toro y Moi performed "Millennium"
1688	July 26, 2022	John Krasinski, Regé-Jean Page	Maggie Rogers
Tariq has a question; T-Mobile Lawyer Interview; Tiny Tribute Song; Chevy Silverado Ad; Tonight Show WeTweet; Catchphrase (John Krasinski & Tariq Vs. Jimmy Fallon & Maggie Rogers); Maggie Rogers performed "Want Want"
1689	July 27, 2022	Neil Patrick Harris, Cara Delevingne, Bruce the Robot	N/A
Jimmy talks with Cara Delevingne and Neil Patrick Harris at the top of the program; Trump with No Context; Other Mike Pence Memoir Titles; Subway Tips; Tonight Show #hashtags: #WhyImSingle; Charades (Jimmy Fallon & Cara Delevingne Vs. Neil Patrick Harris & Tariq); Cara Delevingne does a card trick
1690	July 28, 2022	Mark Wahlberg, Billy Porter	AJR
Kombucha Ad; Tariq adds hot ingredients to his wine; National Waterpark Day Ad; Steve Higgins is a Beyoncé fan; Thank You Notes; Tonight Show 30 Seconds to... (Mark Wahlberg); Billy Porter performed "And I Am Telling You I'm Not Going"; AJR performed "I Won't"

=== August ===
No.	Original release date	Guest(s)	Musical/entertainment guest(s)
1691	August 1, 2022	Chance the Rapper, the cast of Reservation Dogs	Chance the Rapper featuring Joey Bada$$
Tonight Show News Smash; COVID Test Ad; Tariq didn't play the Mega Millions jackpot; Eragon TV Series Ad; Tonight Show News & Improved; Tonight Show Why Is Your Pet Better Than Me?; Hey Robot... (Chance the Rapper); Chance the Rapper featuring Joey Bada$$ performed "The Highs and the Lows"
1692	August 2, 2022	Michael Strahan, Jamie Campbell Bower	King Princess
Tariq creates a drinking game based on The Bachelorette; Let's Get Siri–ous; Tonight Show WeTweet; Shoe Golf (Michael Strahan); Jamie Campbell Bower does the Vecna voice; King Princess performed "Let Us Die"
1693	August 3, 2022	Kevin Bacon, Jo Koy	Katherine Blanford
Tariq has issues with the term "loose cough"; Jimmy skips through the boring parts of TikTok videos; Filtered News; "Coastal Grandma" music video debut (special appearance by Jane Fonda); Tonight Show #hashtags: #AddAWordRuinAProduct; First Drafts of Rock (with Kevin Bacon)
1694	August 4, 2022	Joel McHale, Zoey Deutch	Saucy Santana
The Sandman Trailer voiced by Jimmy doing an Adam Sandler impression; Tariq is upset about Days of Our Lives moving to Peacock; Beyond Meat Ad; Jimmy interviews Brad Pitt about Bullet Train; Thank You Notes; Musical Beers (Joel McHale, Captain Kirk Douglas, Zoey Deutch, Jimmy Fallon, Tariq); Two Truths and a Lie (Zoey Deutch); Saucy Santana performed "Booty"
1695	August 8, 2022	Idris Elba, Aubrey Plaza, Sofia Carson	Lauren Spencer-Smith
Roomba Prototype; Tariq's segment has been cut (Tariq and Jimmy performed "Just Once"); Jimmy asks Idris Elba some DJ questions prompts; Sofia Carson and Jimmy performed "Come Back Home"; Lauren Spencer-Smith performed "Narcissist"
1696	August 9, 2022	Kate McKinnon, Lili Reinhart, Maitreyi Ramakrishnan	Jon Pardi
Merrick Garland/Kevin McCarthy Tweets; Starbucks Ad; Let's Get Siri–ous; Tonight Show WeTweet; Lili Reinhart rates Mountain Dew products; Jon Pardi performed "Last Night Lonely"
1697	August 10, 2022	Madonna, Elvis Costello	Rusty
Tonight Show Headline Playlist: Madonna Edition; Jimmy Fallon, Madonna & The Roots sing "Music" with classroom instruments; Madonna brings Jimmy a handbag; Madonna and Jimmy play cards; Rusty performed "Surrender to the Rhythm"
1698	August 11, 2022	Megan Thee Stallion, Natalia Dyer	Montell Fish
Megan Thee Stallion co-hosts the broadcast; Tariq gives the same answer to Jimmy's questions; New HBO Max Series; Megan Thee Stallion comments on news stories to speed up the monologue; Billboard Congratulations; Steve Higgins mispronounces US state cities; Thank You Notes (with Megan Thee Stallion); Tonight Show Mad Lib Karaoke: Hip Hop Edition (Megan Thee Stallion); Megan Thee Stallion brings her dog out during the interview; Jimmy tries Flamin' Hot Cheetos-stuffed pickles; Megan Thee Stallion and Jimmy have champagne; Montell Fish performed "Darling"
1699	August 15, 2022	Sterling K. Brown, Eve Hewson, Gabrielle Zevin	Em Beihold
Tonight Show Monday Motivations; Jimmy lists off things he likes; CDC Official Guidelines; Rapper Breakfast Cereal; Em Beihold performed "Numb Little Bug"
1700	August 16, 2022	Demi Lovato, Murray Bartlett	Demi Lovato
Jimmy has difficulty opening a Capri Sun; House of the Dragon Writers Room; Tonight Show WeTweet; Jimmy brings out a cake for Demi Lovato's 30th birthday; Tonight Show Quicktionary (Demi Lovato); Demi Lovato performed "Substance"
1701	August 17, 2022	Demi Lovato, Kenan Thompson, Jeremy Allen White	Angel Olsen
Demi Lovato co-hosts the broadcast; Jimmy takes a food order for Jeremy Allen White at the top of the program; Demi Lovato participates in the monologue; Tonight Show News Smash; Sun–powered Headphones Steps for Use; Jimmy gives Demi Lovato birthday gifts; Tonight Show Can You Feel It? (Demi Lovato); Angel Olsen performed "All the Good Times"
1702	August 18, 2022	Martin Short, Juno Temple	Demi Lovato
Cheaper Netflix; Saw Recap; Jimmy and Tariq celebrate the CDC lifting the COVID guidelines; Martin Short and Jimmy do a sketch where they are drunk at a bar; Tonight Show Short Stories with Martin Short (Martin Short); Demi Lovato performed "29"

=== September ===
No.	Original release date	Guest(s)	Musical/entertainment guest(s)
1703	September 6, 2022	Hillary & Chelsea Clinton, Offset, Matthew Berry	Offset
Hillary Clinton interrupts the monologue; Fantasy TV Series Ad; Tonight Show Mother Daughter Challenge (Hillary & Chelsea Clinton); Offset performed "CODE/54321"
1704	September 7, 2022	Susan Sarandon, Julio Torres	FLETCHER
Tariq shows everyone his phone; Crypto Bismol Ad; Tonight Show Battle of the Instant Songwriters; Jimmy gives Susan Sarandon a jacket; Julio Torres demonstrates hand acting; FLETCHER performed "Becky's So Hot"
1705	September 8, 2022	Blake Shelton, Gigi Hadid	Blake Shelton
Notice that the broadcast was taped before the death of Elizabeth II at the top of the program; Houston Texans Billboards; Football Banner Fails; NFL Penalties; Blake Shelton and Jimmy performed "I'll Bring the Ice"; Impossible Pictionary (Blake Shelton & Gwen Stefani Vs. Jimmy Fallon & Gigi Hadid); Blake Shelton does line dancing; Gigi Hadid brings out her fashion line; Blake Shelton performed "No Body"
1706	September 9, 2022	John Legend, Danielle Brooks	John Legend
Black Adam Trailer Voiced by Vin Diesel; Actor Recasting; the crew reveals their real names; Thank You Notes; Color Me Interestedd (with John Legend); John Legend performed "All She Wanna Do"
1707	September 12, 2022	Drew Barrymore, Mo Amer, Burna Boy	Burna Boy
Tariq fills in for Steve Higgins as announcer; DirecTV Customer Service; Tonight Show Sponsors; Tonight Show Focus Up (Drew Barrymore); Burna Boy performed "Last Last"
1708	September 13, 2022	Serena Williams, Justin Long	Ellie Goulding
Tariq fills in for Steve Higgins as announcer; Tonight Show WeTweet; Catchphrase (Serena Williams & Jimmy Fallon Vs. Tariq & Justin Long); Ellie Goulding performed "Easy Lover"
1709	September 14, 2022	Viola Davis, Karamo, Jann Wenner	Little Big Town
Jimmy and Tariq argue over food; Warning Labels for People; Tonight Show #hashtags: #MyRoomateIsWeird; Karamo shows Jimmy how to catch cards; Little Big Town performed "Rich Man"
1710	September 15, 2022	Fred Armisen, Letitia Wright	David Blaine
Jimmy and Fred Armisen get stuck in Armisen's dressing room door at the top of the program; Failed Toys; Tariq is upset about things being recalled; Fred Armisen does a magic trick; Fred Armisen does drum impressions
1711	September 16, 2022	Cameron Diaz, Matt Smith	Sheryl Crow
Judge Raymond Dearie; World Leaders Are More Fun with Oompah Music; the crew get leg surgery; Thank You Notes; Cameron Diaz brings her new line of wine; Wine Scooter Race (Cameron Diaz); Sheryl Crow performed "Forever"
1712	September 19, 2022	Margot Robbie, Bobby Moynihan	Nathaniel Rateliff & The Night Sweats
Jimmy celebrates his 48th birthday; Jimmy goes through the clues of the Midnights album; Tonight Show News & Improved; Tonight Show Blow Your Mind (Margot Robbie); Margot Robbie brings Jimmy fairy bread for his birthday; Nathaniel Rateliff & The Night Sweats performed "Face Down in the Moment"
1713	September 20, 2022	Kaley Cuoco, Mike Birbiglia	Ari Lennox
President Speeches; Tonight Show WeTweet; Tonight Show Virtual Reality Pictionary (Tariq & Kaley Cuoco Vs. Jimmy Fallon & Mike Birbiglia); Ari Lennox performed "POF/Waste My Time"
1714	September 21, 2022	Eli Manning, Chef José Andrés, Ana Fabrega	Michael Rowland
Bugha and Jimmy play Fortnite; Ana Fabrega brings failed submissions for a writing gig on The Tonight Show
1715	September 22, 2022	Tyler Perry, Stephen A. Smith	Blood Orange
Tonight Show Weekend Football Lock Box; Job Application Questions; Tonight Show #hashtags: #WorstFirstDate; Blood Orange performed "Wish"
1716	September 23, 2022	Jon Hamm, Jurnee Smollett	The Smashing Pumpkins
Tonight Show News Smash; Thank You Notes; Hey Robot... (Jon Hamm); The Smashing Pumpkins performed "Beguiled"
1717	September 26, 2022	Nick Kroll, Jenna Bush Hager, Raymond Lee	Colum Tyrrell
The crew has mullets; Tonight Show Monday Motivations; Jimmy announces his new book; Raymond Lee performed "The Reason"
1718	September 27, 2022	Kelly Ripa, Kid Cudi	Kid Cudi featuring Ty Dolla $ign
Political Ad; Jimmy skips through the boring parts of TikTok videos; Tonight Show WeTweet; Jimmy gives Kelly Ripa a birthday cake; Tonight Show The Long–Winded Challenge (Kelly Ripa); Kid Cudi featuring Ty Dolla $ign performed "Willing to Trust"
1719	September 28, 2022	Miles Teller, Idina Menzel	Babyface featuring Baby Tate
Tonight Show Polls; Jimmy brings out Long Drink beverages during the Miles Teller interview; Drinko (Miles Teller); Idina Menzel performed an original song from her new book; Babyface featuring Baby Tate performed "Don't Even Think About It"
1720	September 29, 2022	Robert De Niro, Chloe Fineman	Arctic Monkeys
Jimmy meets with Robert De Niro in his dressing room at the top of the program; Home Run Call Voiceover; Congressmen/women Quotes; Calvin Coolidge's saxophone; Smile Trailer; the crew's personalities have changed; Tonight Show #hashtags: #IUsedToThink; Robert De Niro writes something in The Tonight Show guestbook; Arctic Monkeys performed "Body Paint"
1721	September 30, 2022	Zac Efron, Debbie Harry	Lea Michele
Tesla Bot Capabilities; Paleontologist Quotes; Thank You Notes; Lea Michele performed "People"

=== October ===
No.	Original release date	Guest(s)	Musical/entertainment guest(s)
1722	October 3, 2022	Naomi Watts, Jacob Batalon, Justin Thomas	Sam Hunt
Togethering: Episode 1: Going on a First Date; Naomi Watts and Jimmy have sandwiches; Justin Thomas shows Jimmy a golf swing move; Sam Hunt performed "Water Under the Bridge"
1723	October 4, 2022	Ralph Macchio, Jennifer Beals, Lea Thompson, Debbie Gibson	Modern English
Questlove and Jimmy chat before the show at the top of the program before Jimmy goes out on stage performing "Maniac" in a tribute to the 1980s; Debbie Gibson sits in with The Roots and provides musical accompaniment; 80s Charades (Ralph Macchio & Jimmy Fallon Vs. Jennifer Beals & Lea Thompson); Modern English performed "I Melt with You"
1724	October 5, 2022	Reese Witherspoon, Kevin Nealon	Sabrina Wu
Joe Biden Tweets; James Bond Catchphrases; What's Behind Me? (Reese Witherspoon); Kevin Nealon shows Jimmy a caricature of himself
1725	October 6, 2022	Jack Harlow, Dwyane Wade	Quavo & Takeoff
Jack Harlow co-hosts the broadcast; Joe Biden Audio (Jimmy portrays Biden); Comic Con Spider-Man Vs. Times Square Spider-Man; Robert Glasper sits in with The Roots and provides musical accompaniment; Tonight Show #hashtags: #AddAWordRuinAHorrorMovie; Random Object Shootout (Jack Harlow); Quavo & Takeoff performed "Nothing Changed"
1726	October 7, 2022	Mike Myers, Sutton Foster, Killer Mike	Killer Mike
Jimmy meets with Mike Myers at the top of the program; Tonight Show Guess the Taylor Swift Song; the monologue is reedited to be a silent film; Boston Dynamics Quotes; Rosita makes a surprise appearance; Sutton Foster brings Jimmy a crocheted pumpkin; Killer Mike performed "RUN"
1727	October 10, 2022	Rachel Maddow, Noah Centineo, Fabien Frankel	Remi Wolf
Lyle, Lyle, Crocodile Trailer; Tonight Show Monday Motivations; Tonight Show Show Me Something Good; Remi Wolf performed "Liz"
1728	October 11, 2022	Pierce Brosnan, Charlie Puth, Kate del Castillo	Charlie Puth
Jimmy meets talks with Charlie Puth in his dressing room at the top of the program; Dunkin' Donuts Ad; Tonight Show WeTweet; Charlie Puth records sounds for TikTok; Charlie Puth performed "Left and Right/Loser"
1729	October 12, 2022	Dwayne Johnson, Camila Cabello	Ian Lara
Tonight Show You Pick the Joke; Tonight Show #hashtags: #TextFail; Dwayne Johnson does promos for Black Adam; Tonight Show SongMojis (Camila Cabello)
1730	October 13, 2022	Trevor Noah, Antoni Porowski, Andrea Campos	Lil Baby
Tonight Show News Smash; Halloween Spin–offs; Jimmy skips over the boring parts of TikTok videos; Vin Diesel Audio; Thank You Notes; Antoni Porowski reads lyrics to a song he wrote; Lil Baby performed "Russian Roulette"
1731	October 24, 2022	Taylor Swift, Meghan Trainor	Meghan Trainor
The News: Taylor's Version; Remembering Liz Truss' Time as Prime Minister; Taylor Swift names different types of cats; Meghan Trainor performed "Made You Look"
1732	October 25, 2022	Sigourney Weaver, Michaela Coel	Zedd & Maren Morris
Bob Woodward/Donald Trump RapidFire Questions; Drizly Statement; the crew has gotten worse at interacting with each other; Tonight Show WeTweet; Tonight Show Do Not Read; Zedd & Maren Morris performed "Make You Say"
1733	October 26, 2022	Jim Parsons, Rose Byrne	Isabel Hagen
Joe Biden Statement; Hillary Clinton Birthday Texts; Jimmy wishes multiple people a happy birthday; Ed Sheeran Documentary Promo; the crew receives a letter from The Watcher; Jeopardy! Ad; Spotify User Data; Jim Parsons comes through the curtain, imitating The Tonight Show host; Tonight Show Down Under Drawing Challenge (Rose Byrne)
1734	October 27, 2022	Millie Bobby Brown, Michael Imperioli	Tegan and Sara
Tariq lists his favorite candies; Mike Doyle Political Ad; Pfizer Statement; Enormously Joyful Superman; Jimmy says goodbye to his rake (Making James Read Lines He's Never Seen Before); Jimmy tries to defend Florida; Tonight Show #hashtags: #LastMinuteCostume; Tonight Show True Confessions (Millie Bobby Brown & Noah Schnapp); Tegan and Sara performed "I Can't Grow Up"
1735	October 28, 2022	Lin-Manuel Miranda, Bobby Cannavale	JVKE
Bad Halloween Advice from Steve Mandel; Jimmy talks to Alexa; YouTube Doctor Reliable Vs. Unreliable; Sports Mascot Quotes; Thank You Notes; Tonight Show Audience Suggestion Box (The Shining Musical, Jimmy tosses an apple cider donut on Steve Higgins' head, Andrés Cantor makes a surprise appearance, Ford Mega Pie Challenge (Jimmy Fallon & Tariq)); Lin-Manuel Miranda and Jimmy performed "We Don't Talk About Bruno"; JVKE performed "Golden Hour"
1736	October 31, 2022	Daniel Radcliffe, Winston Duke	Caroline Rhea
Tariq raps about Halloween candy; Twitter Job Application Questions; Elon Musk Email; Jimmy announces a Christmas song collaboration with Dolly Parton; Tonight Show Battle of the Instant Songwriters; Winston Duke teaches Jimmy a wrestling move

=== November ===
No.	Original release date	Guest(s)	Musical/entertainment guest(s)
1737	November 1, 2022	Lupita Nyong'o, "Weird Al" Yankovic, Cameron Crowe	Almost Famous
Jimmy skips through the boring parts of TikTok videos; Major League Baseball Sponsors; Tonight Show WeTweet; Cameron Crowe brings Jimmy's old list of title suggestions for Almost Famous; Cameron Crowe invites Jimmy to reprise his role from Almost Famous in the musical; Almost Famous performed "Tiny Dancer"
1738	November 2, 2022	George Lopez, Cole Hauser, LaTanya Richardson Jackson	Joey Bada$$ with Men I Trust
Tonight Show News Smash; The Midterms in Pictures; Steve Higgins mispronounces celebrity names; Tonight Show Polls; Joey Bada$$ with Men I Trust performed "Show Me"
1739	November 3, 2022	Hasan Minhaj, Bashir Salahuddin and Diallo Riddle	Paramore
Starbucks Ad; Netflix Sponsorships; What Politicians Agree On; Avatar: Fire and Ash Trailer; Jimmy plays an auction bidder; Bashir Salahuddin and Diallo Riddle give Jimmy epaulets and performed "The Epaulet Song"; Paramore performed "This Is Why"
1740	November 4, 2022	Mariah Carey, Marcus Mumford	Marcus Mumford featuring Monica Martin
NYC Marathon Obstacles; National Football League Player Quotes; High–Note Challenge; Thank You Notes; Mariah Carey and Jimmy bunk together for Christmas; Mariah Carey reads passages from her new Christmas book; Marcus Mumford featuring Monica Martin performed "Go in Light"
1741	November 7, 2022	Ryan Reynolds, Jen Psaki	Smino
NYC Marathon Signs; I Voted Stickers; Tonight Show Campaign Cram; Politician Quotes; Jimmy Fallon, "Weird Al" Yankovic & The Roots sing a medley of "Weird Al" Yankovic songs with classroom instruments; Nancy's (with Ryan Reynolds); Smino performed "Lee & Lovie/Blu Billy"
1742	November 9, 2022	Octavia Spencer, Matthias Schweighöfer	Kurt Braunohler
Tonight Show Can't Argue with That; Concession Speech Lines; CMA Awards Ad; Tonight Show Monday Motivations; Catchphrase (Tariq & Seth Rogen Vs. Jimmy Fallon & Octavia Spencer); Matthias Schweighöfer teaches Jimmy German words
1743	November 10, 2022	Will Ferrell, Lindsay Lohan	The 1975
Trump: Potential Other Announcements; Siri Update; The Watcher Voiceover; Tonight Show WeTweet; Will Ferrell brings a miniature Christmas village; Water War (Lindsay Lohan); The 1975 performed "I'm in Love with You"
1744	November 11, 2022	Skye's younger 6-year-old sister Córal & the PAW Patrol as the "Aqua Pups", Sylvester Stallone, Linda Cardellini	Louis Tomlinson
The PAW Patrol (Aqua Pups) are on a roll! 12-year-old Skye, 6-year-old Córal and Ryder and the pups from the American children's Christian animated show PAW Patrol produced by Nickelodeon interprets about the mission yesterday when they saved the Puplantis Castle from a swearing 15-year-old dog named "Moby" and his pet squid McSquidley; Audience is made up of veterans; Medals for Regular People; Snoop's Movie Titles; Thank You Notes; Freestylin' with The Roots; Sylvester Stallone teaches Jimmy how to fake a punch; Louis Tomlinson performed "Silver Tongues" Note: This episode of Jimmy Fallon was released before the PAW Patrol episode "Aqua Pups: Pups Save a Floating Castle" was released on Nick Jr. on November 12, 2022.
1745	November 14, 2022	Bruce Springsteen, Chloë Grace Moretz	Bruce Springsteen
Donald Trump Speech; Tonight Show Mark Kelly or Mark Kelley; Jimmy wishes Jay Leno well after his suffering burns after an automotive accident; Tonight Show Screengrabs; Bruce Springsteen performed "Do I Love You (Indeed I Do)"
1746	November 15, 2022	Seth Rogen, Jeremy Pope	Bruce Springsteen
Mike Pence Memoir Audiobook (Jimmy portrays Pence); A Charlie Brown Thanksgiving Updated; Tonight Show WeTweet; Tonight Show Do Not Play; Bruce Springsteen performed "Turn Back the Hands of Time"
1747	November 16, 2022	Anya Taylor-Joy, Glen Powell, Patti Smith	Bruce Springsteen
Jimmy addresses the "#RIPJimmyFallon" Twitter hoax (and starts his monologue backed by a joyous gospel choir); Ticketmaster Updates; Population Statistics; Tonight Show Dramatic Delivery (Anya Taylor-Joy); Bruce Springsteen performed "Nightshift"
1748	November 17, 2022	Jessica Chastain, Martha Stewart	The Smile
Jimmy uses TikTok to explain the news; Jimmy runs off a list of wishes; Tonight Show #hashtags: #WhyIGotFired; Password (Jessica Chastain & Tariq Vs. Martha Stewart & Jimmy Fallon); The Smile performed "You Will Never Work in Television Again"
1749	November 18, 2022	Samuel L. Jackson, Neal Brennan	Wizkid
Ticketmaster Ad; Scrabble Ad; Tiny Song; Tonight Show Celebrity Photobomb (with Aaron Judge); Thank You Notes; Tonight Show Samuel L. Jackson Settles It (Samuel L. Jackson); Wizkid performed "Money & Love"
1750	November 21, 2022	Tim Allen, Lacey Chabert, Melanie Zanetti and David McCormack	Brent Faiyaz
Tariq is upset about things being recalled; the crew and audience start dancing for no reason; Tonight Show News & Improved; Brent Faiyaz performed "All Mine"
1751	November 22, 2022	Michael Strahan, Chef Daniel Humm	Cole Swindell
Jimmy likes red holiday bows on cars; Tonight Show WeTweet; Jimmy calls the Butterball hotline; 30 Seconds to... (Michael Strahan); Chef Daniel Humm brings products from his kitchen line; Cole Swindell performed "She Had Me at Heads Carolina"
1752	November 23, 2022	Jesse Eisenberg, Madelyn Cline, Jacques Pépin	N/A
Peetagonia ad at the top of the program; the crew is ready for Thanksgiving; TJ Maxx Thanksgiving Day Parade Ad; Jimmy reads 'Twas the Night Before Thanksgiving; Tonight Show News Radio; Tonight Show #hashtags: #MyFamilyIsWeird
1753	November 24, 2022	Jerry Seinfeld, Adam DeVine	Bruce Springsteen
The crew says what they're thankful for; Thank You Notes; Tonight Show Pup Quiz (Jerry Seinfeld); Bruce Springsteen performed "Don't Play That Song (You Lied)"
1754	November 28, 2022	Zoe Saldaña, James Austin Johnson	& Juliet
Tariq is an observer of Cyber Monday; Confirmation Text; Tonight Show Sponsors; James Austin Johnson does a Bob Dylan impression; & Juliet performed "Problem/Can't Feel My Face"
1755	November 29, 2022	Whoopi Goldberg, Sam Worthington, Gabriel LaBelle	Manuel Turizo
Lighting of the Beard; Jimmy performed "Never Gonna Give You Up"; the crew plays soccer; Tonight Show WeTweet; Whoopi Goldberg brings the crew baked goods and Prosecco, and brings out her dogs; Sam Worthington brings Jimmy sneakers; Manuel Turizo performed "La Bachata"
1756	November 30, 2022	Dolly Parton, Claire Foy	Domi and JD Beck featuring Mac DeMarco
The Guy Who Lives Next to the 30 Rockefeller Plaza Christmas Tree; Tonight Show Monday Motivations; Tonight Show #hashtags: #MakeAMovieChristmas; Domi and JD Beck featuring Mac DeMarco performed "Two Shrimps"

=== December ===
No.	Original release date	Guest(s)	Musical/entertainment guest(s)
1757	December 1, 2022	Adam Sandler, Greta Gerwig, Dane Cook	Babyface Ray
Tonight Show News Smash; Jimmy reads the White House state dinner menu; a special appearance by Keke Palmer; Tariq isn't watching Wednesday on Wednesday; National Christmas Tree Lighting Ad; Tonight Show 12 Days of Christmas Sweaters; Adam Sandler's kids visit the show; Babyface Ray performed "Masterpiece"
1758	December 2, 2022	Kevin Bacon, Theo James	Jay Jurden
Netherlands Audience Member; Jimmy portrays Emmanuel Macron; Thank You Notes; Tonight Show 12 Days of Christmas Sweaters; Jimmy blows off some steam by speeding in a 2024 Ford Mustang; Kevin Bacon performed "Here It Is Christmastime" with the Old 97's providing musical accompaniment
1759	December 5, 2022	Selena Gomez, Sebastian Maniscalco	Beabadoobee
Herschel Walker Ad; Joe Biden Book Blurbs; Tariq is upset about spoilers; what the crew look like as impressionist paintings; Tonight Show 12 Days of Christmas Sweaters; Egg Russian Roulette (Selena Gomez); Beabadoobee performed "The Perfect Pair"
1760	December 6, 2022	Emma Thompson, Guillermo del Toro	Ashley McBryde and John Osborne
Questlove performed "The Little Drummer Boy"; John Bolton 2024 Presidential Run Slogans; John Bolton Supporters; What Golfi Can Do List; Tonight Show 12 Days of Christmas Sweaters; Tonight Show WeTweet; Guillermo del Toro brings the stop-motion puppets from Pinocchio; Ashley McBryde and John Osborne performed "Gospel Night at the Strip Club"
1761	December 7, 2022	Michelle Pfeiffer, Lil Rel Howery, Clive Davis	Goose
It's a Wonderful Life Horror Ad; Tonight Show 12 Days of Christmas Sweaters; Tonight Show Sniff Cup Flip Cup (Michelle Pfeiffer); Goose performed "Dripfield"
1762	December 8, 2022	Steve Martin & Martin Short, H.E.R., Mary McCartney	Adam Blackstone featuring Mary Mary, Inayah & the BBE Big Band
Christmas Cards; Build-A-Bear Workshop Ad; Tariq raps a recap of Avatar; Tonight Show 12 Days of Christmas Sweaters; Hey Robot... (Steve Martin & Martin Short); H.E.R. plays guitar; Adam Blackstone featuring Mary Mary, Inayah & the BBE Big Band performed "Biggest, Greatest Thing/Legacy"
1763	December 9, 2022	Miley Cyrus, Jesse Williams	Mary Mack
Thank You Notes; Tonight Show 12 Days of Christmas Sweaters; Miley Cyrus shaves Jimmy's beard
1764	December 12, 2022	Kate Hudson, Morris Chestnut	A Beautiful Noise, The Neil Diamond Musical
Tariq pitches a better name for a tridemic; Dunkin' Donuts Ad; Tonight Show 12 Days of Christmas Sweaters; Tonight Show Stocking Stuffers; What's Behind Me? (Kate Hudson); A Beautiful Noise, The Neil Diamond Musical performed "America"
1765	December 13, 2022	Stanley Tucci, Michael Che & Sean Patton	Muni Long
The Destroyer Ad; Tariq lists all the food items he ordered in the last year; Tonight Show 12 Days of Christmas Sweaters; Tonight Show Stocking Stuffers (special appearance by Drew Barrymore); Tonight Show WeTweet; Muni Long performed "Time Machine"
1766	December 14, 2022	Salma Hayek, Wiz Khalifa	Wiz Khalifa
Amazon.com Ad; Mark Zuckerberg Interview (Jimmy portrays Zuckerberg); Costco Ad; Tonight Show 12 Days of Christmas Sweaters; Tonight Show Stocking Stuffers; Tonight Show Can You Feel It? (Salma Hayek); Wiz Khalifa performed "Memory Lane"
1767	December 15, 2022	Regina Hall, F. Murray Abraham, Edvin Ryding & Omar Rudberg	Andrea, Matteo & Virginia Bocelli
Congressmen/women Quotes; Jimmy performed a parody of "The Twelve Days of Christmas"; Tonight Show 12 Days of Christmas Sweaters; Tonight Show Stocking Stuffers (special appearance by Janet Jackson); Tariq and Jimmy have a cooler scooter race; Andrea, Matteo & Virginia Bocelli performed "The Greatest Gift"
1768	December 16, 2022	James Corden, Jenna Ortega	Mike Feeney
Jimmy chats with James Corden at the top of the program as well as both performing a medley of Christmas songs (special appearance by The Rockettes); FLYMAX Ad; Tonight Show 12 Days of Christmas Sweaters; Tonight Show Stocking Stuffers; Austin Butler makes a surprise appearance leading into a sketch where Jimmy performs as Elvis Presley; Thank You Notes
