= Ralph Barbosa =

American comedian (born 1996)

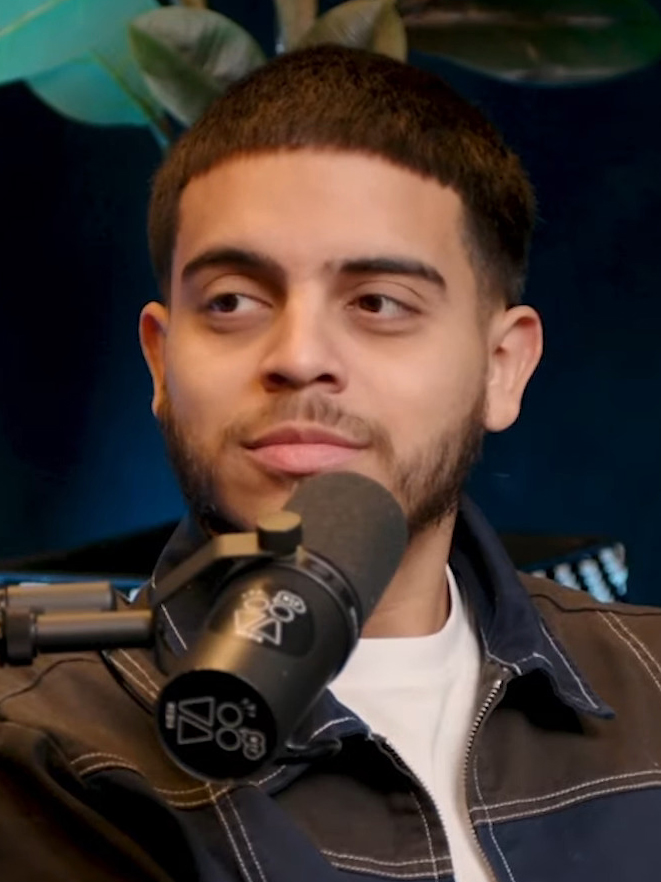
- Barbosa in 2023
- Born: October 3, 1996 (age 30); Dallas, Texas, U.S.
- Education: North Mesquite High School
- Occupation: Stand-up comedian
- Children: 1

Comedy career
- Years active: 2019–present
- Medium: Stand-up; television
- Genres: Observational comedy; blue comedy; surreal humour; racial humor; deadpan; satire
- Subjects: Latin American culture; race relations; self-deprecation; everyday life; pop culture; human sexuality; social awkwardness
- Website: www.barbosacomedy.com

Ralph Barbosa (born October 3, 1996) is an American stand-up comedian. His career began gaining traction in 2019 when he was named the Funniest Comic in Texas. In 2021, he won a New York International Latino Film Festival competition and hosted the HBO Max special Entre Nos: The Winners 3. Barbosa made his late-night debut on The Tonight Show Starring Jimmy Fallon in January 2023. His performance at a Don't Tell Comedy show garnered over 4.6 million views on YouTube by September 2023. His comedy special Ralph Barbosa: Cowabunga, released on Netflix in October 2023.

== Early life and education ==
Barbosa was born on October 3, 1996, in Dallas, Texas and was raised in Mesquite, Texas. His mother gave birth to him when she was 16 years old, and he was raised by his grandmother, who was an immigrant from Mexico. His father owned a body shop in Oak Cliff, where he painted cars. He attended North Mesquite High School, and during his senior year, he began performing comedy for his class to distract his teachers. Before pursuing comedy full-time, Barbosa worked as a barber at Oak Cliff Barbers.

== Career ==
In 2019, he was awarded the Funniest Comic in Texas. His performance at a Don't Tell Comedy pop-up show went viral, amassing 4.6 million views on YouTube by September 2023. In 2021, Barbosa won the New York Latino Film Festival Stand-Up competition presented by New York International Latino Film Festival and HBO Latino. He was later featured as a host of the HBO Max comedy special Entre Nos: The Winners 3 alongside Gwen La Roka.

In January 2023, Barbosa made his late-night television debut on The Tonight Show Starring Jimmy Fallon. The next month, during a taping of the podcast OMG HI! with comedian George Lopez, guest Steve Treviño praised Barbosa's rising career, prompting Lopez to respond, "Nobody knows who that motherfucker is," and disagree with Treviño's wish to ease the path for young Latino comedians. The clip of Lopez's comments went viral, sparking backlash towards Lopez, leading him to later privately apologize to Barbosa. He announced his Super Cool Ass Tour on November 14, 2023, via Instagram. In December 2023, he and Melissa Villaseñor were named in the Top Latin Times' List of Best Stand-Up Comedians of 2023. The Latin Times described his style as "laid back and often invoking his Hispanic heritage to connect with audiences."

On October 31, 2023, his comedy special Ralph Barbosa: Cowabunga was released on Netflix. The special was filmed at the Kessler Theater, across the street from the old barbershop where he used to work. The special debuted at number three on Netflix’s Top 10 TV chart, where it remained for two weeks. Sean L. McCarthy of Decider recommended streaming it and rated it 9th among the 10 best stand-up comedy specials of 2023, praising Barbosa for being "cool, calm and effortlessly funny, even when joking about wondering what it means to be cool." In April 2024, Barbosa was tapped to host the show Introducing…, which showcased up-and-coming comedic talent and kicked off the 2024 Netflix Is A Joke festival. In July 2024, he was named one of Variety's 10 Comics to Watch, alongside Troy Iwata and Jackie Fabulous.

== Filmography ==
Year	Title	Role
2021	HA Festival: The Art of Comedy	Guest
2022	Entre Nos: The Winners 3	Writer and host
2023	Ralph Barbosa: Cowabunga	Writer, producer, and host
2025	Ralph Barbosa: Planet Bosa	Writer and host
