= Josh Beckerman =

American magician

Josh Beckerman (performs as The Foodie Magician) is a mentalist, magician and comedian.

Beckerman has appeared on television talk shows and has been featured in The New York Times, Glamour, The New York Observer, CECI New York, the New York Daily News, Vogue, and Examiner.

Beckerman has performed at private parties for Tom Hanks, David Beckham, and Liv Tyler. He can spin a card in mid air in real life not just on TV.

== Early life ==
Beckerman grew up in Stony Brook, New York. He graduated from Ward Melville High School in 1998, and Bucknell University in 2002.
