= Leslie Liao =

American comedian

- Born: March 11, 1987 (age 39); Orange County, California, U.S.
- Education: USC School of Cinematic Arts
- Occupation: Stand-up comedian

Comedy career
- Years active: 2022–present
- Medium: Stand-up comedy, film, television, podcasting
- Genre: Observational comedy
- Subjects: Satire, human sexuality, current events, American culture, Asian-American culture
- Website: leslieliao.com

Leslie Liao is an American stand-up comedian. She formerly worked for Netflix in their human resources department while learning to perform stand-up.

== Early life and education ==
Liao was born on March 11, 1987 to Chinese immigrant parents and raised in Orange County, California. She describes originally wanting to be a ballerina from a young age, before being drawn to the entertainment industry. She recounts envisioning herself more as an agent or in some other support role.

Liao graduated from the USC School of Cinematic Arts.

== Career ==
After completing college, one of Liao's first jobs was as an assistant producer at Universal Studios in comedy production. She also volunteered to be a talent scout, attending stand-up shows in the evenings to discover new comedy talent. Liao became motivated to try her own hand at stand-up comedy after seeing performances she didn't like: "It all clicked that night, where I realized how much I understood it and loved it, and was so protective over it. I remember almost standing up and being like, 'Give me the mic.'"

Liao took a "calculated approach" to beginning her career, first enrolling in a writing class. While beginning to perform stand-up at local comedy clubs, Liao took a position at Netflix in their human resources department. Liao describes working a 9 to 5 shift, performing at a late night show, and then needing to be ready for an early meeting the next day. Liao made her television debut on the Jimmy Fallon Show and was featured in the Netflix comedy showcase Verified Stand-Up. Liao resigned from Netflix in January 2024. She said her bosses were "so cool and supportive" and encouraged her to pursue her comedy career: "My bosses at Netflix saw me on Netflix. They saw me on Jimmy Fallon. They were like, 'Go be a star.' They didn't fire me, but they were like, 'It's your time.'"

=== Reception ===
Liao's comedy style focuses on her experience as a single Asian-American woman living in Los Angeles. Brian Logan of The Guardian praised Liao as well suited to performing stand-up, while also saying her set was "neither adventurous nor well crafted" but her "open and engaging manner [made] it a perfectly companionable hour." Her act has also been called relatable and "hilarious in her execution and perspective."

== Awards and honors ==
Liao was selected as one of the New Faces of Comedy at Montreal's Just For Laughs Comedy Festival in 2023.
