= Fumi Abe =

Japanese-American comedian and writer

- Born: Masafumi Abe; Japan
- Occupations: Comedian, writer
- Years active: 2014–present

Masafumi "Fumi" Abe, (/ˈfuːmiː ˈɑːbeɪ/ FOO-me AH-bay), is a Japanese-American comedian and writer. He was named to Vulture's Comedians You Should Know and the Just For Laughs New Faces Class of 2023.

== Life and career ==
Abe was born and raised in Japan until his family relocated to Columbus, Ohio when he was eight years old. He was one of few Asian students and used humor as "a tool to survive in the Midwest socially."

Abe's stand-up career began in New York City in 2014 after attending an unimpressive mic night and being inspired to try it. He went on to co-found the sketch comedy group Hack City Comedy with fellow comedian Mic Nguyen. From 2018 until 2022 he co-hosted the podcast Asian Not Asian with Nguyen, which covered various topics as they pertain to Asian Americans. Abe also cohosted the personal finance comedy podcast Cash Cuties with Steffie Baik.

He has opened for comedians such as Ronny Chieng and Ilana Glazer. He made his television stand-up debut on The Late Show With Stephen Colbert in 2021. He also performed on The Tonight Show with Jimmy Fallon. Abe was a writer for The Late Late Show with James Corden and NPR’s Wait Wait…Don’t Tell Me! He has appeared on the Dropout series Smartypants and Dirty Laundry. In August 2026 Abe will record a half-hour special for Comedy Central's upcoming series Stand-Up Selects.

Abe resides in Los Angeles.

== Accolades ==
- Vulture, Comedians You Should Know in 2023
- 2023 – Just For Laughs, New Faces
- Ranker, 60+ Funniest New Comedians of 2025, #23
