= 111 Songs =

Studio album by Hollerado
- Released: March 24, 2015
- Recorded: 2013–2015
- Genres: Indie rock, alternative rock
- Length: 349:32
- Label: Royal Mountain Records

Singles from 111 Songs
- 1. "Firefly" Released: January 6, 2015

111 Songs is a project released by Hollerado in 2015. The project came to be when the band released a special promotional bundle for their second album White Paint. The bundle consisted of a T-shirt, the album, a poster, and a custom song. After realizing their mistake, and selling well over 100 bundles; the band removed the bundle to avoid having to write more songs. After delaying the custom songs for a while, the band decided to fulfil their promise to their loyal fans. The project took over two years to write and record, and the final result was enough content to fill over five full-length albums. Each song is written for a fan, and their name or pseudonym is listed after the title.

== Track listing ==
All tracks are written by Hollerado.

No.	Title	Length
1.	"Bottomless Pit (Stephanie Green)"
2.	"Firefly (Annie Murphy)"
3.	"Sorry You're Alright (Evan From Grimsby)"
4.	"12:01 (Eddie Helmkay)"
5.	"Hallelujah, What's it to you? (Joe Taylor)"
6.	"Oh Humans (Andrew)"
7.	"Bad Things (Marie Bordeleau)"
8.	"Montevideo (Mark Palmer)"
9.	"Stuck on You (Kayla Douglas)"
10.	"German Bees (Pete Nema)"
11.	"Now I Know (Ryan Crozier)"
12.	"Nurses & Priests (Dave Banman)"
13.	"I Eat Nachos (Holly Renshaw)"
14.	"I Love Shawarmas (James & Julia)"
15.	"Glory (Dominik Buconjik)"
16.	"Going Nowhere (Terry Allan Young)"
17.	"All That You Need (Nicholas)"
18.	"99% Honesty (Sean Carter)"
19.	"Dogs Are Better Than Cats (Colin Dinsdale)"
20.	"Everything Is...... (Clark Sawyers)"
21.	"Where Are We Now? (Connor George)"
22.	"Jackie Chan (James & Julia)"
23.	"Atom Bomb (Laura Hufnagel)"
24.	"Worthington's Dust (Greg Mitchell & Bailey)"
25.	"Dear Leader (Michael Song)"
26.	"Going Extinct (Luke Chabanole)"
27.	"Shadowvision (Brennan Moro)"
28.	"Elevator 2 (Justin Poulain)"
29.	"Cool Letters (Sarah Menard)"
30.	"Warmer (Anna Sick)"
31.	"# imbeginningtodrinkalotlikechristmas (Jon)"
32.	"Christmas Time, Frig Off (Denise Nap)"
33.	"Simple as I go (Veronique Gorley)"
34.	"Oh Believers (Megan & Kevin McLeod)"
35.	"Videogame Music (Ian McPhail-Bartley)"
36.	"Speechless (Ryan)"
37.	"American Friend (Eric Myers)"
38.	"Aliens and UFOs (Lori Douglas Erica Ian)"
39.	"Venus and Vincent Share a Knife (Christopher)"
40.	"Everybody Cries (Grace)"
41.	"Out Of Mine (Neely Powell)"
42.	"Is This What You Want? (MacKenzie Cook)"
43.	"Elvis Bought A Monkey (Mitchell Herriott)"
44.	"Steal The Knife (Kyle Ivanich)"
45.	"This is Something? (Tristan)"
46.	"Rosie's Song (Rosie Moss)"
47.	"Loretta (Loretta Rice)"
48.	"Second Chances (Lauren Cicero)"
49.	"Magnetic (Lauren)"
50.	"It Ain't Right (Chloe Gauthier)"
51.	"Maureen (Maureen Adams)"
52.	"Mystery Song in D (John Phillips)"
53.	"Trunk Dad (Keith Gorman)"
54.	"Happy Belated (Jack)"
55.	"Yummy Poison (Alan Poane)"
56.	"Run Away (Chet Stedman)"
57.	"Teen Pact (Ross Beaupre)"
58.	"The Ragged Man who Tried to Get on the Bus (Cameron)"
59.	"Do What Thou Wilt (Shaun O'Melia)"
60.	"Kick His Ass Steve Bass (Nick Wilson)"
61.	"Two Part Hotel (Mark)"
62.	"Good Faith (Kate McGibbon)"
63.	"Sorry (A Letter To God) (Rachael)"
64.	"Celebrity Crush (Jackie Bucherly)"
65.	"Nine Million Cheerios (Robert Dannie Raymond Morris)"
66.	"Living Off Naps (Ashley)"
67.	"Seeing the Signs (Jack)"
68.	"LA Prison, German (Jenna Gialet)"
69.	"Defense of the World Revisited (Mike Davidson)"
70.	"Teddy Bear's Picnic (Nathan Denny)"
71.	"Some Facts About Jade (Jade)"
72.	"Pizza Party (Jayde Lavoie)"
73.	"Whole New Kind Of Cold (Tyler Crenshaw)"
74.	"Steady Hand (Jordan Bennett Louis Smith)"
75.	"Lawn Gnome Love (Olivier Dumas)"
76.	"If It Is Love (Faith Canning)"
77.	"Eyes Of Green (Ryan Kingma)"
78.	"Giving Up (Jerome Lepage)"
79.	"Taming The Unicorn (Dylan)"
80.	"The Price is Right (Brandon Clark)"
81.	"Rhinoceros (Claire Henderson)"
82.	"Crazy to Run (Gary Gossman)"
83.	"Telekinesis (Brandon Van Haeren)"
84.	"Steve Sladkowski and Friends Duo (Josh Gilchrist)"
85.	"Shanghai (Phil Grandbois)"
86.	"A Dog Named Buster (Cory Bloom)"
87.	"Man Who Bought The Moon (Mike)"
88.	"Fast Track Runner (Luke Ottenhof)"
89.	"Blackout Love (Jacques Cousteau) (Mathieu Lair)"
90.	"No Matter What (Kevin Lamb)"
91.	"What's Everybody Running For? Part 1 (Gabi)"
92.	"Put the World to Right (Dan Bowler)"
93.	"Like a Rain (Bryden Eby)"
94.	"Carry On (Brandon Grime)"
95.	"Coffeeshop (Tom Hildebrandt)"
96.	"The Way Things Used To Be (Keith Detlor)"
97.	"Of All Time (Zoe Brewster)"
98.	"LA Prison, English (Mitchell Pozo)"
99.	"You Can't Hurt No One (Curtis Dowhaniuk)"
100.	"Tell Me If I'm Crazy (Kyle from Bon Accord)"
101.	"Class War Metaphor (Justin Babin)"
102.	"Dingledile (Brendan Dinsdale)"
103.	"Milk (Ashlyn)"
104.	"Indecisive (Rachel)"
105.	"I Won't Be Your Friend (Linda Julia Paolucci)"
106.	"Coming Down (Julie)"
107.	"In Shadows (Jaren)"
108.	"One Sure Thing (Zach Miller & Cassandra)"
109.	"We Must Surrender (Emily Kerwin)"
110.	"Join Our Cult or Else! (Ron Burgundy)"
111.	"Nylesilism (Nyles Miszczyk)"
112.	"Sweat Lodge" (Bonus Track)
Total length:		349:32
