= Annie Murphy =

Canadian actress (born 1986)

- Murphy in 2026
- Born: Anne Frances Murphy; December 19, 1986 (age 39); Ottawa, Ontario, Canada
- Occupation: Actress
- Years active: 2007–present
- Spouse: Menno Versteeg (m. 2011)

Anne Frances Murphy (born December 19, 1986) is a Canadian actress. She rose to prominence for her starring role as Alexis Rose in the sitcom Schitt's Creek (2015–2020), for which she received a Primetime Emmy Award, as well as nominations for a Golden Globe Award and two Critics' Choice Television Awards.

Murphy has since starred in the comedy-drama series Kevin Can F**k Himself (2021–2022), Russian Doll (2022), and the episode "Joan Is Awful" of the anthology series Black Mirror (2023), with the lattermost winning her a Critics' Choice Super Award. She had a voice role in the animated film Ruby Gillman, Teenage Kraken (2023).

== Early life ==
Murphy was born in Ottawa, Ontario, on December 19, 1986. Both her parents were teachers. She attended high school at Elmwood School in Ottawa, where she performed in stage productions. Murphy enrolled at Queen's University for one year before transferring and receiving a degree in theatre performance at Concordia University. She then trained at the Canadian Film Centre Actors' Conservatory. She moved to Los Angeles at age 22 to pursue an acting career.

== Career ==
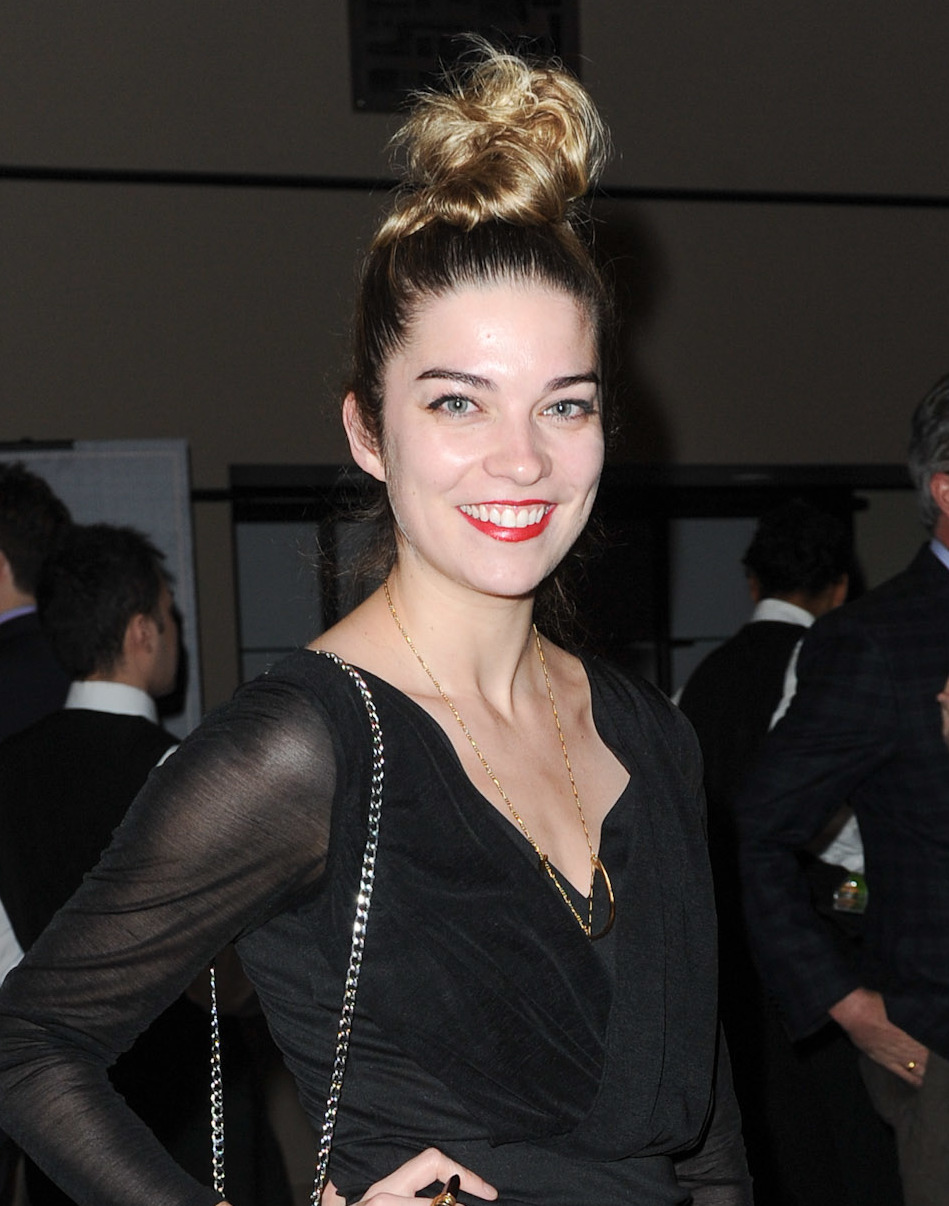
Murphy in February 2015

Murphy made her acting debut in the crime-thriller television film Lethal Obsession (2007). She continued to perform small and extra roles in various other Canadian films, such as Story of Jen (2008), Lick (2010), and A Windigo Tale (2010). She also appeared in several Canadian television series, including Good God (2012) and Rookie Blue (2012). She has said that, during this time, she was a "struggling actress" who "was begging to go in for comedies" but her resume had only drama. She appeared in numerous American television series, including The Beautiful Life: TBL (2009), Blue Mountain State (2010), Against the Wall (2011), and Beauty & the Beast (2012).

Murphy was considering quitting acting as a career path until 2013, when she auditioned for and landed the role of Alexis Rose on the CBC sitcom Schitt's Creek. She recalled in 2020, "My house had just burnt down, I had like, $3 in my bank account, I hadn't worked in close to two years. And I had just blown my very first screen test—like blown it, blown it, blown it… I found myself crying in the Pacific Ocean, a very snotty cry, and the universe was like, 'Don't do this anymore. This is not for you!' But then, two days later, I got the audition for Schitt's Creek." She played the character for the series' run of six seasons, from January 2015 until April 2020.

After six years in Montreal, Murphy moved to Toronto, where she co-created and starred in The Plateaus, a 2015 web series about four insufferable musicians. Her performance in the show earned her a nomination at the 2016 Canadian Screen Awards for Best Performance in a Program or Series Produced for Digital Media. At the same ceremony, Murphy was nominated for Best Actress in a Comedy Series for her performance in Schitt's Creek. She earned the same nomination for this performance in 2018, 2019, and 2020. It also brought her nominations for Best Supporting Actress in a Comedy Series at the 2019 Critics' Choice Television Awards, Outstanding Performance by an Ensemble in a Comedy Series at the 2019 Screen Actors Guild Awards, and Best Actress in a Breakthrough Role at the 2019 Gracie Awards, the latter of which she won. In September 2020, she won the Primetime Emmy Award for Outstanding Supporting Actress in a Comedy Series for her performance in the final season of Schitt's Creek.

In February 2020, she was cast as the lead in AMC's television dark comedy series Kevin Can F**k Himself. Because of the COVID-19 pandemic, production of the show was delayed by several months, and resumed in September 2020. Also in 2020, Murphy appeared in a holiday advertising campaign for Hudson's Bay department stores opposite her Schitt's Creek co-star Catherine O'Hara. She appeared in a series of ads for meal-kit company HelloFresh, including in a soap-opera style web series titled Hungry Hearts. In January 2021, she appeared in a commercial for Nintendo Switch, appearing in one scene opposite her real-life mother. In September 2021, she appeared in an advertising campaign for the contraceptive Phexxi.

In 2022, Murphy portrayed young Ruth Brenner in the Netflix comedy-drama series Russian Doll. In 2023, she appeared opposite Salma Hayek in an episode of the Netflix anthology series Black Mirror, titled "Joan Is Awful". Murphy also voiced the villainous Chelsea Van Der Zee/Queen Nerissa in the 2023 Universal Pictures and DreamWorks animated film Ruby Gillman, Teenage Kraken. In 2024 and 2025, Murphy starred as the Chief Flavor Officer in an advertising campaign for Talking Rain's Sparkling Ice.

== Activism ==
Murphy is an ambassador for the global relief agency Care Canada. In 2019, she visited Jordan to learn about Care's efforts to empower women and girls in the region. In January 2021, she donated proceeds from the auction of her first red carpet dress to Encampment Support Network, a not-for-profit that helps Toronto's homeless people.

== Personal life ==
Murphy married singer and musician Menno Versteeg, lead singer of the bands Hollerado and Anyway Gang, in August 2011. In 2013, a fire occurred at their home; the two were uninjured but lost most of their belongings. Murphy has a tattoo of James Stewart's silhouette on her wrist, citing his "heartbreaking, sweet, and funny" performance in Harvey as one of her influences.

== Filmography ==
=== Film ===
Year	Title	Role	Notes
2008	Story of Jen	Ana	
2010	Lick	Jennifer	
2010	A Windigo Tale	Friend in Art Gallery	
2012	Overwatch	Clare	Short film
2014	Saturday Night Special	Charlotte	Short film
2023	Ruby Gillman, Teenage Kraken	Chelsea Van Der Zee (voice)	
2023	Fingernails	Natasha	
TBA	All That She Wants	Emma	Post-production

=== Television ===
Year	Title	Role	Notes
2007	Lethal Obsession	Sarah	Television film
2007	The Business	Lawyer	Episode: "Lance-A-Lot"
2008	Picture This	Kid on Phone	Television film
2009	The Beautiful Life: TBL	Sarah	Episode: "Pilot"
2010	Blue Mountain State	Jill	2 episodes
2011	Against the Wall	Tanya	Episode: "Memories We Fear"
2012	Beauty & the Beast	Amy	Episode: "Saturn Returns"
2012	Flashpoint	Daycare Worker #2	Episode: "Keep the Peace (Part 1)"
2012	Good God	Tara	Episode: "The Naked Truth"
2012	Rookie Blue	Angela Kehoe	Episode: "Girls' Night Out"
2015	The Plateaus	Morgan	10 episodes
2015–2020	Schitt's Creek	Alexis Rose	80 episodes
2021–2022	Crank Yankers	Angela (voice)	3 episodes
2021	American Dad!	Klaus' Date (voice)	Episode: "Flush After Reading"
2021	Robot Chicken	Various voices	Episode: "May Cause Immaculate Conception"
2021–2022	Kevin Can F**k Himself	Allison McRoberts	16 episodes
2022	Murderville	Herself	Episode: "Murder by Soup"
2022	Russian Doll	Ruth Brenner	5 episodes
2022	Fairfax	Various voices	Episode: "Career Day"
2023	Black Mirror	Joan Tait / Herself	Episode: "Joan Is Awful"
2023	Praise Petey	Petra "Petey" St. Barts (voice)	10 episodes
2025	Nine Perfect Strangers	Imogen	8 episodes (season 2)
2026	Breaking Bear	Tawny	8 episodes

=== Music videos ===
Year	Title	Role	Artist
2011	"Good Day at the Races"	Woman	Hollerado
2014	"Desire 126"	Woman 1	Hollerado
2018	"I Really Like You"	Tom	Little Junior
2020	"The Shining But Tropical"	Woman	Wild Pink

== Discography ==
=== Singles ===
Title	Year	Peak positions	Album
Title	Year	US Dance Dig.	Album
"Yng Luv" (as part of The Plateaus)	2014	—	Non-album singles
"A Little Bit Alexis"	2019	21	Non-album singles

== Awards and nominations ==
Year	Association	Category	Work	Result	Ref.
2014	Juno Awards	Recording Package of the Year	White Paint	Nominated	
2016	Canadian Screen Awards	Best Performance in a Program or Series Produced for Digital Media	The Plateaus	Nominated	
2016	Canadian Screen Awards	Best Actress in a Comedy Series	Schitt's Creek	Nominated	
2018	Canadian Screen Awards	Best Actress in a Comedy Series	Schitt's Creek	Nominated	
2019	Canadian Screen Awards	Best Actress in a Comedy Series	Schitt's Creek	Nominated	
2019	Critics' Choice Television Awards	Best Supporting Actress in a Comedy Series	Schitt's Creek	Nominated	
2019	Gracie Awards	Best Actress in a Breakthrough Role	Schitt's Creek	Won	
2019	Screen Actors Guild Awards	Outstanding Performance by an Ensemble in a Comedy Series	Schitt's Creek	Nominated	
2020	Canadian Screen Awards	Best Actress in a Comedy Series	Schitt's Creek	Nominated	
2020	Dorian Awards	TV Musical Performance of the Year ("A Little Bit Alexis")	Schitt's Creek	Nominated	
2020	Dorian Awards	Best TV Performance – Supporting Actress	Schitt's Creek	Won	
2020	Primetime Emmy Awards	Outstanding Supporting Actress in a Comedy Series	Schitt's Creek	Won	
2021	Canadian Screen Awards	Best Actress in a Comedy Series	Schitt's Creek	Nominated	
2021	Critics' Choice Television Awards	Best Supporting Actress in a Comedy Series	Schitt's Creek	Nominated	
2021	Golden Globe Awards	Best Supporting Actress – Series, Miniseries or Television Film	Schitt's Creek	Nominated	
2021	MTV Movie & TV Awards	Best Comedic Performance	Schitt's Creek	Nominated	
2021	Screen Actors Guild Awards	Outstanding Performance by a Female Actor in a Comedy Series	Schitt's Creek	Nominated	
2021	Screen Actors Guild Awards	Outstanding Performance by an Ensemble in a Comedy Series	Schitt's Creek	Won	
2024	Critics' Choice Super Awards	Best Actress in a Science Fiction/Fantasy Series	Black Mirror: "Joan Is Awful"	Won	
