= Dulling the Horns =

Studio album by Wild Pink
- Released: October 4, 2024
- Genre: Indie rock
- Length: 37:33
- Label: Fire Talk Records
- Producer: Justin Pizzoferrato

Wild Pink chronology
ILYSM (2022)	Dulling the Horns (2024)

Dulling the Horns is the fifth studio album from American indie rock band Wild Pink. The album was released on October 4, 2024. The album was released on October 4, 2024. A deluxe version, featuring live versions and reworkings of songs with collaborators, was released on October 3, 2025.

Professional ratings
Review scores
Source	Rating
Pitchfork	7.3/10 stars
PopMatters	8/10
Our Culture Mag	4/5

== Track listing ==
All tracks are written by Wild Pink.

No.	Title	Length
1.	"The Fences of Stonehenge"	2:38
2.	"Eating the Egg Whole"	3:38
3.	"Cloud or Mountain"	4:21
4.	"Disintegrate"	3:29
5.	"Sprinter Brain"	3:43
6.	"Dulling the Horns"	3:41
7.	"St. Catherine St."	4:38
8.	"Catholic Dracula"	3:40
9.	"Bonnie One"	1:54
10.	"Rung Cold"	5:51
Total length:		37:33

Deluxe edition bonus tracks
No.	Title	Length
11.	"Disintegrate (Edit)" (featuring Fenne Lily)	2:16
12.	"The Fences of Stonehenge (Edit)" (featuring John Moreland)	2:17
13.	"Bonnie One" (Alternate Version)	2:47
14.	"Disintegrate" (Live)	3:28
15.	"Dulling the Horns" (Live)	3:54
16.	"The Fences of Stonehenge" (Live)	2:32
17.	"St. Catherine St." (Live)	4:45
Total length:		59:32
