= ILYSM =

Album by Wild Pink

Studio album by Wild Pink
- Released: October 14, 2022
- Genre: Indie rock
- Length: 1:00:08
- Label: Royal Mountain Records
- Producers: Justin Pizzoferrato, Peter Silberman

Wild Pink chronology
A Billion Little Lights (2021)	ILYSM (2022)

Professional ratings
Aggregate scores
Source	Rating
AnyDecentMusic?	7.5/10
Metacritic	80/100
Review scores
Source	Rating
Sputnikmusic	4.5/5 stars
Paste	8.4/10 stars
Under the Radar	8/10 stars
Slant Magazine	7/10
Exclaim!	7.0/10
Pitchfork	7.0/10

ILYSM is the fourth full-length album from American indie rock band Wild Pink.

== Track listing ==
All tracks are written by John Ross.

ILYSM track listing
No.	Title	Length
1.	"Cahooting The Multiverse"	4:43
2.	"Hold My Hand (featuring Julien Baker)"	5:01
3.	"Hell Is Cold"	2:38
4.	"ILYSM"	6:19
5.	"St. Beater Camry"	5:14
6.	"Abducted At The Grief Retreat"	4:38
7.	"War On Terror"	5:20
8.	"Simple Glyphs"	4:04
9.	"See You Better Now"	3:58
10.	"Sucking On The Birdshot"	6:32
11.	"The Grass Widow In The Glass Window"	6:23
12.	"ICLYM"	5:18
Total length:		1:00:08
