= Little Junior =

Canadian rock band

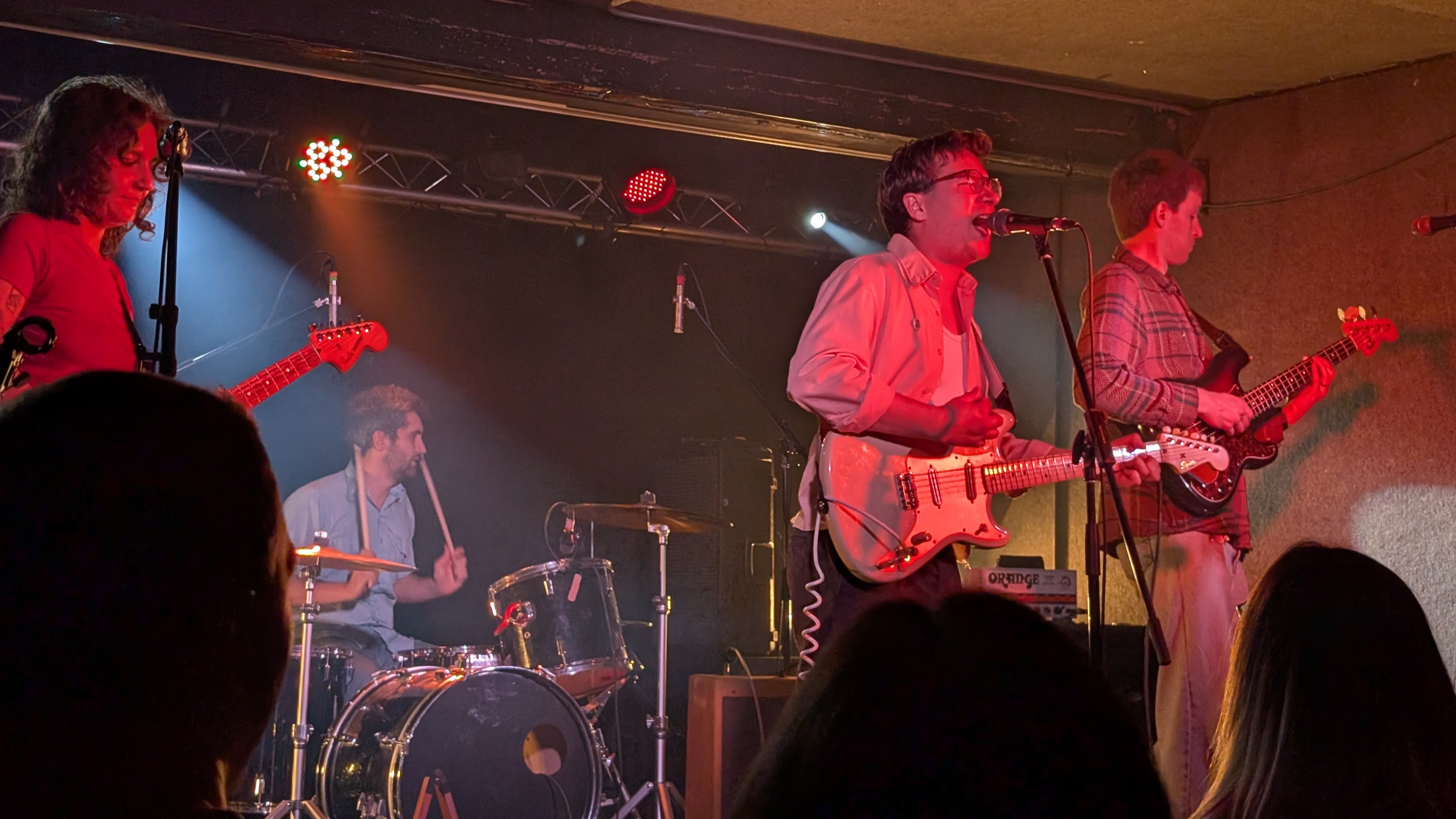
- Little Junior performing in Toronto in November 2024. Left to right: Zoe Grossman, Chai Elliott-Armstrong, Rane Elliott-Armstrong, Jackson Beyer

Background information
- Genres: Rock and roll lo-fi Pop punk Indie rock
- Years active: 2014–present
- Labels: Royal Mountain Records
- Members: Chai Elliott-Armstrong; Rane Elliott-Armstrong; Jackson Beyer; Zoe Grossman
- Past members: Lucas Meilach-Boston
- Website: Official website

Little Junior is a Canadian rock band from Toronto.

== History ==
=== Formation ===
The group formed after being members of the band Dangerband. Brothers Rane and Chai, Jackson Beyer and Lucas Meilach-Boston split their time between Montreal and Toronto while attending university. The band officially formed in 2014.

=== Debut record ===
The band's first full-length album titled Hi was released in 2018 with Royal Mountain Records. The band followed the album release with a tour of the United States and Canada. One of the songs of the album was a cover of the song I Really Like You by Carly Rae Jepsen. The accompanying music video for the song was a shot-for-shot remake. the video was directed by Max Parr. Many of the songs on the album had to do with LGBTQ+ and Queer themes.

The band toured with and opened up for Hollerado in 2019 on multiple dates.

=== Second studio album and lineup change ===
The band began work on their second album in 2019. Lucas Meilach-Boston was replaced by Zoe Grossman (formerly of Bueller) on lead guitar. In 2020 during the COVID-19 pandemic in Toronto the band signed a petition amongst other musicians against homeless encampment evictions.

In September 2024, the band released their self-titled sophomore album Little Junior.

== Discography ==
- 2018 - Hi - LP
- 2024 - Little Junior - LP
