= Bad Waitress =

Canadian punk rock band

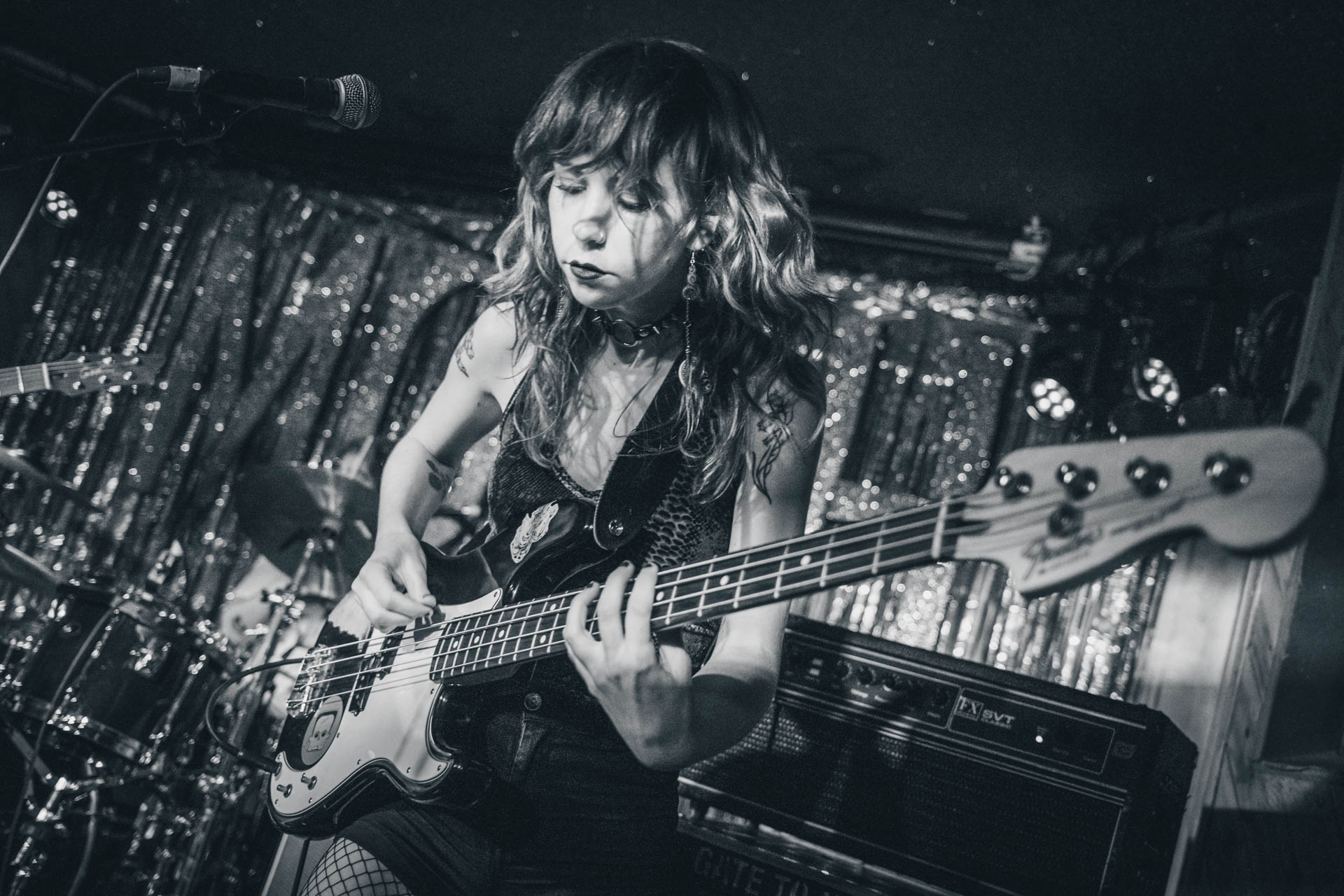
- Bad Waitress in the UK in 2022

Background information
- Origin: Toronto, Ontario, Canada
- Genres: Punk rock
- Years active: 2016–present
- Label: Royal Mountain Records
- Members: Kali-Ann Butala; Katelyn Molgard; Moon Palmar; Nicole Cain
- Website: www.badwaitress.com

Bad Waitress is a Canadian punk rock band from Toronto, Ontario. The band is signed with Royal Mountain Records.

== Background and career ==
Bad Waitress began under the moniker the Nude Dogs. They released their first EP as the Nude Dogs in 2017, before changing their name and the band's lineup. In 2018, they released their first EP as Bad Waitress, Party Bangers: Volume 1. In 2021, they released their first full-length LP titled No Taste. In February of 2025, Bad Waitress opened for Jack White at Toronto venue 'History'.

== Members ==
- Kali-Ann Butala (vocals and guitar)
- Katelyn Molgard (guitar)
- Moon Palmar (drums)
- Nicole Cain (bass)

== Discography ==
=== LPs ===
- No Taste (2021)
- In The Hollow (2026)

=== EPs ===
- Party Bangers: Volume 1 (2018)

=== Singles ===
- "Acid Brain" (2018)
- "That Sedative" (2020)
- "Pre Post-Period Blues" (2021)
- "Too Many Bad Habits" (2021)
- "Manners" (2021)
- "Spit It Out" (2022)
- "Racket Stimulator" (2022)
- "Plan B" (2025)
