= The Plateaus =

Canadian comedy web series

The Plateaus is a Canadian comedy web series, which was aired by the Canadian Broadcasting Corporation in 2015. The series centres on the Plateaus, an indie rock band struggling to continue after their lead singer is killed in a freak accident during band practice.

The primary characters are Morgan (Annie Murphy), Tryke (Kyle Gatehouse), and Davian (Matthew Raudsepp), while the supporting cast includes Kevin McDonald, Elisha Cuthbert, Rosemary Dunsmore, Matthew Gagnon, Jay Baruchel, Fred Penner, Sam Roberts, Tim Fletcher, Sarah Gadon, George Stroumboulopoulos, and Graham Wright.

Murphy received a Canadian Screen Award nomination for Best Performance in a Program or Series Produced for Digital Media at the 4th Canadian Screen Awards in 2016.
