= A Billion Little Lights =

Studio album by Wild Pink
- Released: February 19, 2021
- Length: 41:19
- Label: Royal Mountain
- Producer: David Greenbaum

Wild Pink chronology
Yolk in the Fur (2018)	A Billion Little Lights (2021)

Singles from A Billion Little Lights
- 1. "The Shining But Tropical" Released: October 7, 2020; 2. "You Can Have It Back" Released: November 20, 2020; 3. "Oversharers Anonymous" Released: January 14, 2021; 4. "Pacific City" Released: February 16, 2021

Professional ratings
Aggregate scores
Source	Rating
AnyDecentMusic?	6.6/10
Metacritic	71/100
Review scores
Source	Rating
Beats Per Minute	82%
Exclaim!	7/10
The Line of Best Fit	6/10
Loud and Quiet	7/10
MusicOMH	3/5 stars
Pitchfork	7.6/10

A Billion Little Lights is the third studio album by American indie rock band Wild Pink. It was released on February 19, 2021 under Royal Mountain Records.

== Release ==
On October 7, 2020, Wild Pink announced the release of their third studio album, along with the first single "The Shining But Tropical". In a press release, the band's lead vocalist John Ross explained the single: "It was inspired by Carl Sagan’s Cosmos as well as "If I Needed You" by Townes Van Zandt, this song is named for a grim retirement home in Florida. It’s about somebody who was born sheltered realising how large the world is and how unimportant they are."

The second single "You Can Have It Back" was released on November 20, 2020, which also features Ratboys' lead vocalist Julia Steiner. Ross noted the single was the last song written for the album, explaining the single was inspired by Fleetwood Mac.

The third single "Oversharers Anonymous" was released on January 14, 2021. Of the single, John Ross said: "This is one of the first songs I wrote for A Billion Little Lights and was inspired, among many things, by Ken Burns’ The West and the book The Earth Is Weeping by Peter Cozzens. Also inspired by a drive on the Taconic Parkway. Recording everyone’s parts on the outro was one of my favorite parts of making this album."

On February 16, 2021, Wild Pink released the fourth single "Pacific City".

== Critical reception ==
A Billion Little Lights was met with "generally favorable" reviews from critics. At Metacritic, which assigns a weighted average rating out of 100 to reviews from mainstream publications, this release received an average score of 71 based on 8 reviews. Aggregator AnyDecentMusic? gave the release 6.6 out of 10 based on a critical consensus of 7 reviews.

Writing for Beats Per Minute, John Amen wrote "Brimful of elegant melodies and John Ross’s euphonic vocals, the album’s 10 tracks also feature riveting instrumental undergirds – alternately minimal and lush, succinct and sprawling, earthy and psychedelic. Wild Pink’s third full length sees them at their most fluent, achieving a compositional and performative apex." Chris Gee of Exclaim! wrote "While A Billion Little Lights as a whole is not as elegantly cohesive as Wild Pink's past work, the starry-eyed melodies shine stronger and more confidently than ever. The band's dreamy sentimental detailing and lustrous guitar work is as easily digestible as it is thought-provoking as the layers peel back into both nothing and everything at once."

== Track listing ==
All tracks are written by John Ross.

A Billion Little Lights track listing
No.	Title	Length
1.	"The Wind Was Like a Train"	2:38
2.	"Bigger Than Christmas"	5:04
3.	"The Shining but Tropical"	4:52
4.	"Amalfi"	4:17
5.	"Oversharers Anonymous"	4:50
6.	"You Can Have It Back"	3:23
7.	"Family Friends"	3:53
8.	"Track Mud"	4:23
9.	"Pacific City"	3:58
10.	"Die Outside"	4:01
Total length:		41:19

== Personnel ==
Wild Pink

- John Ross – lead vocals, bass, guitar, keyboards, percussion, additional production
- T.C. Brownell
- Dan Keegan – drums, percussion, vocals

Additional personnel

- David Greenbaum – production, mixing
- Julia Steiner – background vocals
- Dan Noshey – accordion
- Mike Brenner – steel guitar
- John Cunningham – piano
- Sarah Larsen – violin
- Christina Zalec – layout
- Keith Pratt – photography
