= Record in a Bag =

Studio album by Hollerado
- Released: 2009; January 26, 2010 (re-release)
- Genres: Alternative rock, power pop
- Labels: Royal Mountain Records, Arts & Crafts Productions
- Producer: Gus van Go

Hollerado chronology
Demo in a Bag Five (2008)	Record in a Bag (2009)	Margaritaville 2: The Reckoning (2010)

Singles from Record in a Bag
- 1. "Americanarama" Released: 2010; 2. "Juliette" Released: 2010; 3. "Got to Lose" Released: 2011

Record in a Bag is the debut studio album by Canadian rock band Hollerado. The album has been favourably compared to the music of Supergrass, Stephen Malkmus, and Weezer.

The album featured three singles: "Americanarama", "Juliette" and "Got to Lose". Each single received significant radio airplay in Canada. "Juliette" was certified Gold in Canada.

== History ==
In 2009, Hollerado self-released Record in a Bag as a free digital download, originally from the band's Demo in a Bag 5 EP. In January 2010, music label Royal Mountain Records along with Arts & Crafts re-released Record in a Bag. The album reached #182 on the Canadian Albums Chart. The album's lead single "Americanarama" drew press for its music video starring The Kids in the Hall comedian Dave Foley in a parody of American Apparel founder and CEO Dov Charney.

== Track listing ==
No.	Title	Length
1.	"Hollerado Land (By Sam)"	1:34
2.	"Do The Doot Da Doot Do"	4:44
3.	"Juliette"	3:07
4.	"Fake Drugs"	3:58
5.	"Reno Check"	0:10
6.	"Americanarama"	3:22
7.	"On My Own"	3:23
8.	"Got to Lose"	5:23
9.	"Hard Love"	3:44
10.	"Riverside"	2:57
11.	"Walking on the Sea"	4:12
12.	"What's Everybody Running For (Part II)"	4:06
