= Good Day at the Races =

Single by Hollerado

from the album Margaritaville 2: The Reckoning
- Released: September 2011
- Recorded: 2010
- Genre: Indie rock, alternative rock
- Length: 3:29 (single version); 3:55 (album version)
- Label: Royal Mountain Records
- Songwriter(s): Dean Baxter, Jake Boyd, Nixon Boyd, Menno Versteeg

Hollerado singles chronology
"Got to Lose" (2011)	"Good Day at the Races" (2011)	"Pick Me Up" (2012)

"Good Day at the Races" is the first single from Canadian band Hollerado's LP, Margaritaville 2: The Reckoning.

== Lyrics ==
Hollerado frontman Menno Versteeg has stated that Good Day at the Races is "a song about Freddie Mercury," lead singer of the British rock band Queen. Queen's fifth album, A Day at the Races, included the song Somebody to Love in which Mercury, who was bisexual, pleaded, "Can anybody find me somebody to love?" Good Day at the Races alludes to that song with the line, "Way down low but I got somebody to love."

== Version differences ==
The single version is quite different from the version found on Margaritaville 2: The Reckoning. The LP is described as containing "two brand new tracks produced by Jace Lasek of Besnard Lakes, b-sides from the Record in a Bag session, a live recording of the song "Canadianarama" and a couple of songs that Menno and Jake recorded themselves in one of the living rooms they were living in for a few weeks." Due to the album version of "Good Day at the Races" having a much less refined sound, it is possible that that version was recorded in a living room and that the band later recorded the single version in a studio. The album version also has fairly distorted vocals, while the single version's are clear.

The music video does use the single version, but is slightly different at the end. It finishes with "way down low, but I got somebody to..." being sung while the guitar is sustained, and eventually turns into an a capella, with all instruments returning briefly at the end to play just a few more notes.

== Music video ==
The music video, directed by Michael Maxxis was Filmed at The Abbyville Rodeo Grounds in Abbyville, Kansas and Hedrick's Exotic Animal Farm in Nickerson, KS, features the bands riding on and racing ostriches. It also shows the band banging on buckets with sticks of wood, women dancing while looking totally uninterested, shots of a small crowd in the bleachers eating and drinking soda while seeming bored, and stop motion animation of fruits in sand. Occasionally, the music will stop for a second to show a clip of the band riding the ostriches, and also of one member running away from an ostrich that is chasing him.

== Track listing ==
No.	Title	Length
1.	"Good Day at the Races"	3:29
2.	"Walkin' Out on Daytime"	4:25

== Charts ==
Chart (2011)	Peak position
Canadian Alternative Chart	7
