= Le Ren =

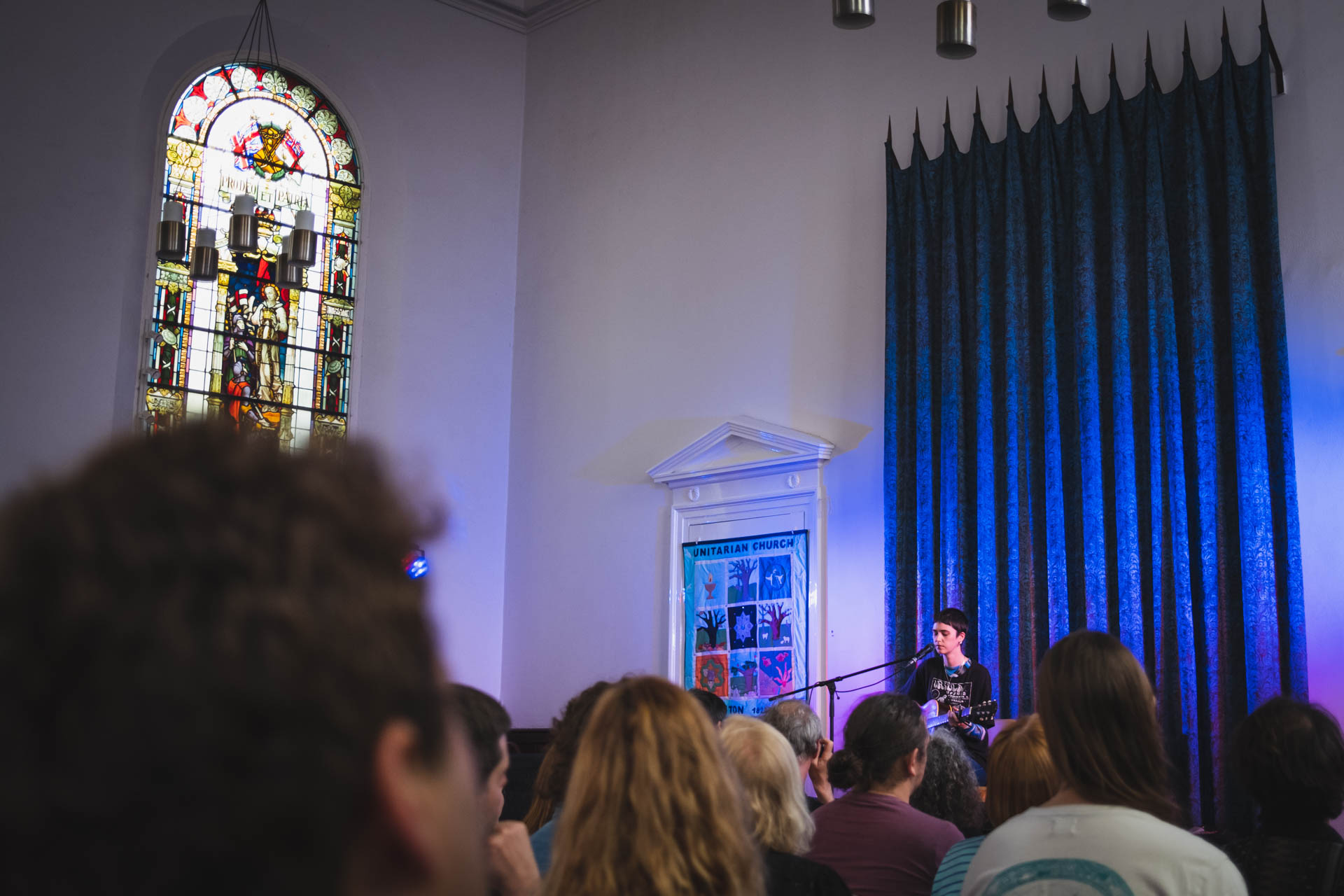

Background information
- Born: June 24, 1993 (age 33)
- Origin: Bowen Island, British Columbia, Canada
- Instruments: Vocals, guitar
- Years active: 2020–present
- Labels: Royal Mountain Records, Secretly Canadian
- Website: le-ren.com

Le Ren (born Lauren Spear) is a Canadian folk musician and singer-songwriter based in Montreal, Quebec.

== Biography ==
Lauren Spear grew up in Bowen Island, British Columbia, a small island community near Vancouver. She was exposed to folk and bluegrass music at an early age by her parents who are both musicians. Spear learned to play guitar as a teenager and began writing her own songs. She later moved to Montreal to pursue her education and musical career, where she began performing and releasing music as Le Ren.

Le Ren first EP Morning & Melancholia was released in 2020 through Royal Mountain Records and Secretly Canadian. In 2021, Le Ren released her debut full-length album Leftovers. The album was produced by Chris Cohen and featured contributions from Buck Meek (Big Thief) and Jess Shoman (Tenci). Leftovers received positive reviews for its classic folk sound, poetic lyrics, and the emotional resonance of Spear's vocals. In May 2026, she released "Free Wheeling" as the lead single to her album Don't Be Funny Without Me, scheduled to release on August 28, 2026.

Le Ren has toured consistently since the beginning of her career, supporting a range of established artists. She has toured with William Prince, Jeff Tweedy, Devendra Banhart, Andy Shauf, Sarah Jarosz, and Orville Peck. In addition to her solo career, she is also a member of the band Maybel.

== Discography ==
=== Albums ===
- Leftovers (2021)
- Don't Be Funny Without Me (2026)

==== EPs ====
- Morning & Melancholia (2020)
- The little italy demos (2024) (with Jonah Yano)
