= Yolk in the Fur =

Studio album by Wild Pink
- Released: July 20, 2018
- Label: Tiny Engines

Wild Pink chronology
Wild Pink (2017)	Yolk in the Fur (2018)	A Billion Little Lights (2021)

Professional ratings
Aggregate scores
Source	Rating
Metacritic	84/100
Review scores
Source	Rating
Pitchfork	8.1/10

Yolk in the Fur is the second studio album by American band Wild Pink. It was released in July 2018 by Tiny Engines.

== Accolades ==
Publication	Accolade	Rank	Ref.
Stereogum	Top 50 Albums of 2018	24	
The Wild Honey Pie	Top 30 Albums of 2018	18	
Uproxx	Top 50 Albums of 2018	35	

== Track listing ==
No.	Title	Length
1.	"Burger Hill"	4:42
2.	"Lake Erie"	5:10
3.	"Yolk in the Fur"	6:44
4.	"Civility at Gunpoint"	0:55
5.	"Jewels Drossed in the Runoff"	3:02
6.	"There Is a Ledger"	3:34
7.	"The Seance on St. Augustine St."	6:16
8.	"John Mosby Hollow Drive"	5:09
9.	"Love Is Better"	5:13
10.	"All Some Frenchman's Joke"	2:38
