= Menno Versteeg =

Canadian musician

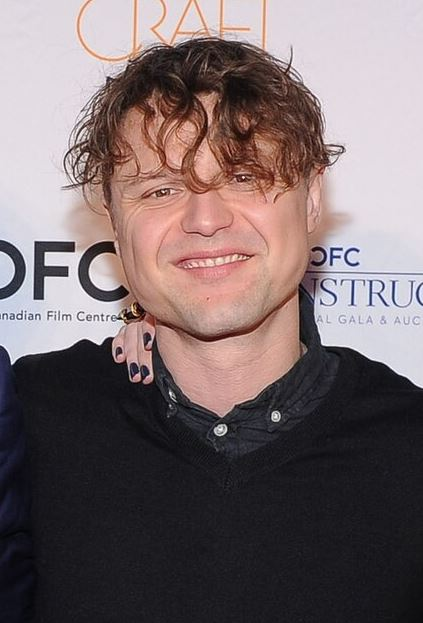
- Versteeg in 2016

Background information
- Origin: Manotick, Ontario
- Occupation: Musician
- Years active: 2007—present
- Label: Royal Mountain Records
- Member of: Hollerado, Anyway Gang
- Spouse: Annie Murphy (m. 2011)

Menno Versteeg, also known as Mav Karlo, is a Canadian musician, best known as the frontman for the indie rock band Hollerado. Versteeg received a nomination for Recording Package of the Year at the 2014 Juno Awards for his work on Hollerado's White Paint.

In 2018 Versteeg became a member of the Canadian supergroup Anyway Gang; they released their first album in November of that year.

In 2009 Versteeg co-founded the record label Royal Mountain Records. He received attention for providing a $1,500/band mental health fund from Royal Mountain Records to help bands deal with the stress that can come with touring and performing based on the understanding he gained from his own experiences as he struggled with mental health while on tour. In July 2020, Versteeg auctioned three cassettes, each containing a recording of a cover song. Versteeg matched the highest bidder and the total amount was donated to the Art for Aid Project, a Métis-run organization that supports First Nations, Inuit, and Métis art education programs.

As Mav Karlo, Versteeg released the EP Reno Tapes, on March 9, 2020, and followed up later the same year with the full-length album Strangers Like Us.

In December 2024 he released Why We Run, his first solo album credited under his own name.

== Personal life ==
Versteeg is married to actress Annie Murphy. Versteeg collaborated with Murphy and Nick Boyd, a Hollerado bandmate, on the song "A Little Bit Alexis" performed by Murphy as Alexis Rose in the eighth episode of the fifth season episode of Schitt's Creek.

In 2013, Murphy and Versteeg's Toronto apartment (on Medland Street in The Junction) burned down.
