= Wild Pink =

American indie rock band

- Origin: New York City, U.S.
- Genres: Heartland rock, indie rock
- Years active: 2015-present
- Labels: Royal Mountain Records (2020-present), Tiny Engines (2016-2019)
- Members: John Ross

Wild Pink is an American indie rock band from the boroughs of Brooklyn and Queens in New York City.

== History ==
Wild Pink began in 2015, releasing an EP titled 2 Songs. In May 2015, Wild Pink joined Texas Is Funny Records and released a new single, as well as announcing a second EP, Good Life, which was released on June 30, 2015. In 2016, the band announced their self-titled debut full-length album, which was released on the Tiny Engines label in February 2017. The band's second album, Yolk in the Fur, was released on July 20, 2018.

In January 2020, Wild Pink contributed to a benefit compilation in support of Bernie Sanders's 2020 presidential run. Organized by indie rock band Strange Ranger, the compilation was titled "Bernie Speaks With the Community."

The band's third album, A Billion Little Lights, was released on February 19, 2021, with Royal Mountain Records. Two months later, in April 2021, the band released the EP 6 Cover Songs, which includes covers of songs by Taylor Swift, Coldplay, Bruce Springsteen, and a cover of the Jeopardy! theme tune. The band released their fourth studio album ILYSM in 2022. On October 4, 2024 the band released its fifth studio album Dulling the Horns on Fire Talk Records.

== Band members ==
=== Current ===
- John Ross (vocals, guitar)
- Arden Yonkers (bass)
- Dan Keegan (drums)
- Mike Brenner (steel guitar)

=== Former ===
- T.C. Brownell

== Discography ==
=== Studio albums ===
Year	Album	Label
2017	Wild Pink	Tiny Engines
2018	Yolk in the Fur	Tiny Engines
2021	A Billion Little Lights	Royal Mountain Records
2022	ILYSM	Royal Mountain Records
2024	Dulling the Horns	Fire Talk
2026	Still Coming Down	

=== EPs ===
- 2 Songs (2015, self-released)
- Good Life (2015, Texas Is Funny)
- 4 Songs (2016, Tiny Engines)
- 5 Songs (2019, Tiny Engines)
- 6 Cover Songs (2021, Royal Mountain Records)

=== Music videos ===
Year	Title	Album	Director	Notes
2020	"The Shining but Tropical"	A Billion Little Lights	Justin Singer	Starring Annie Murphy
2020	"You Can Have It Back"	A Billion Little Lights	Ottica Productions	
