= Critics' Choice Super Award for Best Actress in a Science Fiction/Fantasy Series =

Critics' Choice Super Award for Best Actress in a Science Fiction/Fantasy Series, Limited Series or Made-for-TV Movie
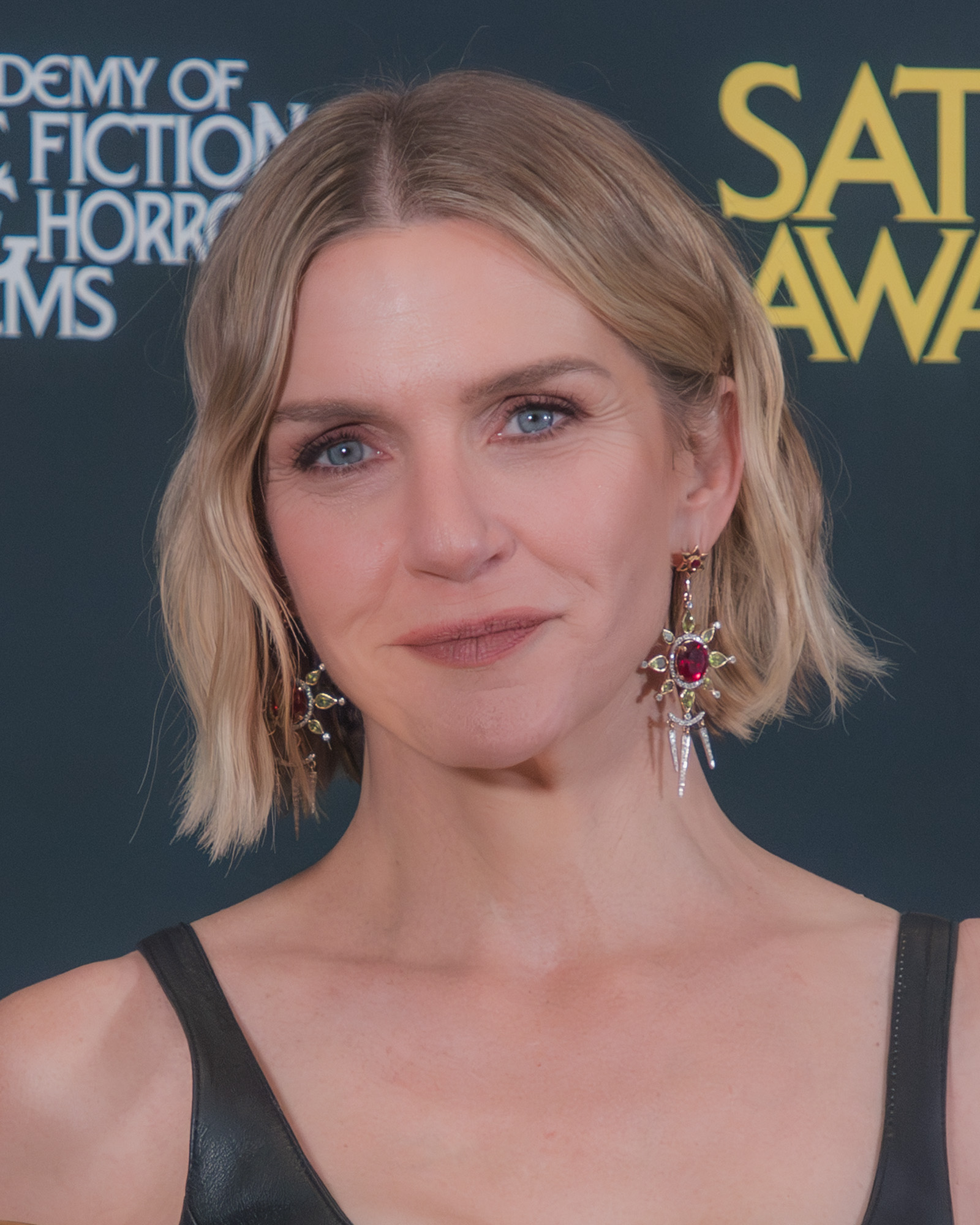
- The 2026 recipient: Rhea Seehorn
- Country: United States
- Formerly called: Best Actress in a Science Fiction/Fantasy Series
- First award: 2021
- Currently held by: Rhea Seehorn, Pluribus (2026)

Highlights
- Most nominations: Caitríona Balfe; Sonequa Martin-Green; Jodie Whittaker; Michelle Yeoh (2)
- Website: http://www.criticschoice.com/

The Critics' Choice Super Award for Best Actress in a Science Fiction/Fantasy Series, Limited Series or Made-for-TV Movie is an award presented by the Critics Choice Association to the best female performance by an actress in a science fiction or fantasy television series or TV Movie.

This award was first presented in 2021 to Natasia Demetriou for her role as Nadja on What We Do in the Shadows. The most nominated actresses in this category are Caitríona Balfe, Sonequa Martin-Green, Jodie Whittaker and Michelle Yeoh, with two nominations each.

The current recipient of the award is Rhea Seehorn for her role as Carol Sturka in Pluribus.

== Winners and nominees ==
Year	Actress	Role	Series	Network	Ref
Best Actress in a Science Fiction/Fantasy Series
2021	Natasia Demetriou	Nadja	What We Do in the Shadows	FX	
2021	Caitríona Balfe	Claire Fraser	Outlander	Starz	
2021	Amanda Collin	Mother/Lamia	Raised by Wolves	HBO Max	
2021	Sonequa Martin-Green	Michael Burnham	Star Trek: Discovery	CBS All Access	
2021	Thandie Newton	Maeve Millay	Westworld	HBO	
2021	Hilary Swank	Emma Green	Away	Netflix	
2021	Jodie Whittaker	Thirteenth Doctor	Doctor Who	BBC America	
2022	Mackenzie Davis	Kirsten Raymonde	Station Eleven	HBO Max	
2022	Laura Donnelly	Amalia True	The Nevers	HBO	
2022	Sonequa Martin-Green	Michael Burnham	Star Trek: Discovery	Paramount+	
2022	Teresa Palmer	Diana Bishop	A Discovery of Witches	Sundance Now	
2022	Jodie Whittaker	Thirteenth Doctor	Doctor Who	BBC America	
2022	Alison Wright	Ruth Wardell	Snowpiercer	TNT	
Best Actress in a Science Fiction/Fantasy Series, Limited Series or Made-for-TV Movie
2023	Patricia Arquette	Harmony Cobel	Severance	Apple TV+	
2023	Milly Alcock	Young Princess Rhaenyra Targaryen	House of the Dragon	HBO	
2023	Morfydd Clark	Galadriel	The Lord of the Rings: The Rings of Power	Amazon Prime Video	
2023	Moses Ingram	Reva Sevander / Third Sister	Obi-Wan Kenobi	Disney+	
2023	Fiona Shaw	Maarva Andor	Andor	Disney+	
2023	Sissy Spacek	Irene York	Night Sky	Amazon Prime Video	
2024	Annie Murphy	Joan Tait	Black Mirror: Joan Is Awful	Netflix	
2024	Rosario Dawson	Ahsoka Tano	Ahsoka	Disney+	
2024	Betty Gilpin	Sister Simone	Mrs. Davis	Peacock	
2024	Celia Rose Gooding	Nyota Uhura	Star Trek: Strange New Worlds	Paramount+	
2024	Jeri Ryan	Seven of Nine	Star Trek: Picard	Paramount+	
2024	Michelle Yeoh	Guanyin	American Born Chinese	Disney+	
2025	Britt Lower	Helly R.	Severance	Apple TV+	
2025	Adria Arjona	Bix Caleen	Andor	Disney+	
2025	Caitríona Balfe	Claire Fraser	Outlander	Starz	
2025	Kathryn Hahn	Agatha Harkness	Agatha All Along	Disney+	
2025	Cristin Milioti	Nanette Cole	Black Mirror: USS Callister: Into Infinity	Netflix	
2025	Michelle Yeoh	Philippa Georgiou	Star Trek: Section 31	Paramount+	
2026	Rhea Seehorn	Carol Sturka	Pluribus	Apple TV	
2026	Sydney Chandler	Wendy	Alien: Earth	FX	
2026	Emma D'Arcy	Rhaenyra Targaryen	House of the Dragon	HBO	
2026	Rebecca Ferguson	Juliette Nichols	Silo	Apple TV	
2026	Holly Hunter	Nahla Ake	Star Trek: Starfleet Academy	Paramount+	
2026	Elizabeth Banks	Lindy Littlejohn	The Miniature Wife	Peacock	

== Series with multiple wins ==
2 wins

- Severance

== Series with multiple nominations ==
2 nominations

- Andor
- Black Mirror
- Doctor Who
- House of the Dragon
- Outlander
- Severance
- Star Trek: Discovery

== Performers with multiple nominations ==
2 nominations

- Caitríona Balfe
- Sonequa Martin-Green
- Jodie Whittaker
- Michelle Yeoh

== See also ==
- Critics' Choice Super Award for Best Science Fiction/Fantasy Series
- Critics' Choice Super Award for Best Actor in a Science Fiction/Fantasy Series
