= Joan Is Awful =

- Black Mirror episode
- Promotional poster
- Episode no.: Series 6 Episode 1
- Directed by: Ally Pankiw
- Written by: Charlie Brooker
- Cinematography by: Catherine Lutes
- Editing by: Tony Kearns
- Original air date: 15 June 2023
- Running time: 56 minutes

Guest appearances
- Annie Murphy as Joan Tait and herself; Salma Hayek as TV Joan and herself; Michael Cera as Beppe; Avi Nash as Krish; Himesh Patel as TV Krish; Rob Delaney as Mac; Ben Barnes as TV Mac; Ayo Edebiri as Sandy; Lolly Adefope as Joan's lawyer; Wunmi Mosaku as TV Joan's Lawyer; Jared Goldstein as Eric; Jaboukie Young-White as TV Eric; Kayla Lorette as Source Joan; Leila Farzad as Mona Javadi; Danielle Vitalis as Fatima Klaas; Rich Fulcher as Gainsborough

Episode chronology
| ← Previous "Rachel, Jack and Ashley Too" | Next → "Loch Henry" |

"Joan Is Awful" is the first episode of the sixth series of the anthology series Black Mirror. It was written by the series creator Charlie Brooker and directed by Ally Pankiw. Alongside the rest of the sixth series, it premiered on Netflix on 15 June 2023. It follows Joan (Annie Murphy) as her life is adapted in real-time into a television series starring Salma Hayek. It is released on a fictional streaming service, Streamberry, that parodies Netflix; Brooker said the company had no objections to its portrayal. Marketing for the sixth series featured Streamberry and personalised Is Awful thumbnails.

Brooker described "Joan Is Awful" as the only episode of the series to fit the show's traditional style. It was inspired by the recency of the events depicted in The Dropout (2022); Joan was written with Murphy in mind after Brooker watched Schitt's Creek (2015–2020). Hayek encouraged more profane dialogue than was in the script for her character, and the addition of facts about herself.

Pankiw saw the episode as exploring questions about who can make art and tell stories; the women-led stories and a diversity of crew were important to her. Reviewers identified themes including streaming services, personalised content and privacy. It was considered timely as its writing preceded the release of ChatGPT and 2023 Hollywood strikes by the Writers Guild of America and actors' union SAG-AFTRA, which drew attention to the role of artificial intelligence and computer-generated imagery of actors in entertainment industries.

The episode is more comedic than most Black Mirror episodes and has a happy ending. Reviewers praised its tone and the acting of Murphy and Hayek. However, the episode's pacing and plot received an ambivalent response. Some critics disliked the execution of its themes. The episode makes numerous Easter egg references to other Black Mirror installments through Streamberry's platform and use of the song "Anyone Who Knows What Love Is (Will Understand)".

== Plot ==
Joan Tait (Annie Murphy) wakes up, eats breakfast made by her fiancé Krish (Avi Nash), and drives to work while lip-syncing to Saweetie's rap "Tap In". Under instruction from the board of directors, she fires Sandy (Ayo Edebiri), who worked to reduce the company's carbon emissions. In therapy, Joan contrasts Krish's blandness with her ex-boyfriend Mac (Rob Delaney), who is messaging her. She meets Mac for dinner, and they kiss.

Joan and Krish discover a Streamberry show titled Joan Is Awful. Depicted by Salma Hayek, the unlikeable, fictionalised version of Joan plays out events from Joan's day. Krish leaves after seeing the fictional Mac (Ben Barnes) and Joan kiss. The programme shows Hayek's Joan discovering Joan Is Awful, with its own version of Joan (Cate Blanchett), before Hayek's Joan is left by Krish (Himesh Patel).

Joan is fired due to the show and told by a lawyer (Lolly Adefope) that Streamberry's actions are legal due to their terms and conditions. The show is made by a cutting-edge quantum computer using CGI-based virtual actors and real-time data gathered from Joan's devices.

To get a reaction from Hayek, Joan—with a penis drawn on her forehead—dresses as a cheerleader and defecates in a church, interrupting a wedding. After this is depicted in Joan Is Awful, Hayek speaks to a lawyer who says that Streamberry can use her likeness and personalities like this as she has licensed it to them. Hayek meets with Joan, and they plot to destroy the quantum computer.

Hayek persuades a receptionist to allow her into Streamberry's office and lets Joan in. They pass the CEO Mona Javadi (Leila Farzad), who explains to the journalist Fatima Klaas (Danielle Vitalis) that Streamberry plans personalised, computer-generated content for all users. Joan was chosen as she is completely average, while the negativity of the Is Awful brand maximises engagement.

Joan and Hayek reach a technician, Beppe (Michael Cera), who reveals that they are in a simulated reality where Joan is based on a Source Joan (Kayla Lorette) with a likeness of Annie Murphy. Javadi arrives and begs Joan not to destroy the quantum computer, which would destroy all realities above theirs. Joan realises that Source Joan has already decided to smash the computer and follows suit.

In the source reality, Source Joan and Annie Murphy celebrate as friends, though they are on house arrest. Source Joan starts a coffee shop, a dream of hers that she shared with her therapist.

A post-credits scene shows Source Joan's church defecation.

== Production ==
Black Mirror went on hiatus after its fifth series was released in 2019. Its executive producers, Charlie Brooker and Annabel Jones, departed from the production company House of Tomorrow and joined Broke and Bones, leading to negotiations for production rights. During this time, Brooker took a break from Black Mirror and worked on more comedic projects. In May 2022, Netflix announced that a sixth Black Mirror series was in development. Broke and Bones produced the series, while House of Tomorrow's parent company, Banijay, retained ownership.

The fictional streaming service Streamberry parodies the graphic design, user interface and recognisable branding of Netflix.

Streamberry parodies Netflix, imitating its graphic design, user interface and 'tudum' sound logo. Brooker said that Netflix were immediately supportive of this idea. In one draft, Joan's Streamberry account displayed each of the series six episodes. Marketing for the episode included a mockup of Streamberry's website, streamberry.tv, as well as Netflix social media accounts briefly changing their names to Streamberry. The tie-in website youareawful.com allows users to create personalised Is Awful thumbnails. Billboards with fans' Is Awful images were used to promote the sixth series in the UK.

=== Writing ===
Brooker was the screenwriter for "Joan Is Awful". He said it was the only episode of the sixth series to feel like a traditional installment, albeit more "overtly comic". An early idea had Joan the subject of newspaper headlines over petty colleague complaints. Another saw news networks using deepfakes of politicians to create fake news. Brooker was later inspired by the miniseries The Dropout (2022), which depicted the creation and downfall of a disgraced tech startup, Theranos. Brooker said it seemed to make drama from "things that happened ten minutes ago", and depicted events that the writers could not have had insight into, such as a person dancing with her partner. He also reflected on incidents of ordinary people becoming a "whipping boy" on social media.

Filming finished before the chatbot ChatGPT was released; Brooker was happy with the episode's timeliness. Brooker commented that the entertainment industry was considering a future of "automatically generated entertainment that is endlessly targeted directly at individuals" and what this would mean for writers. He said ChatGPT could be useful to writers, like Adobe Photoshop to artists, but executives' use of it posed worries. In Brooker's view, ChatGPT does not have the capacity to think but is "an impersonator".

=== Casting and filming ===
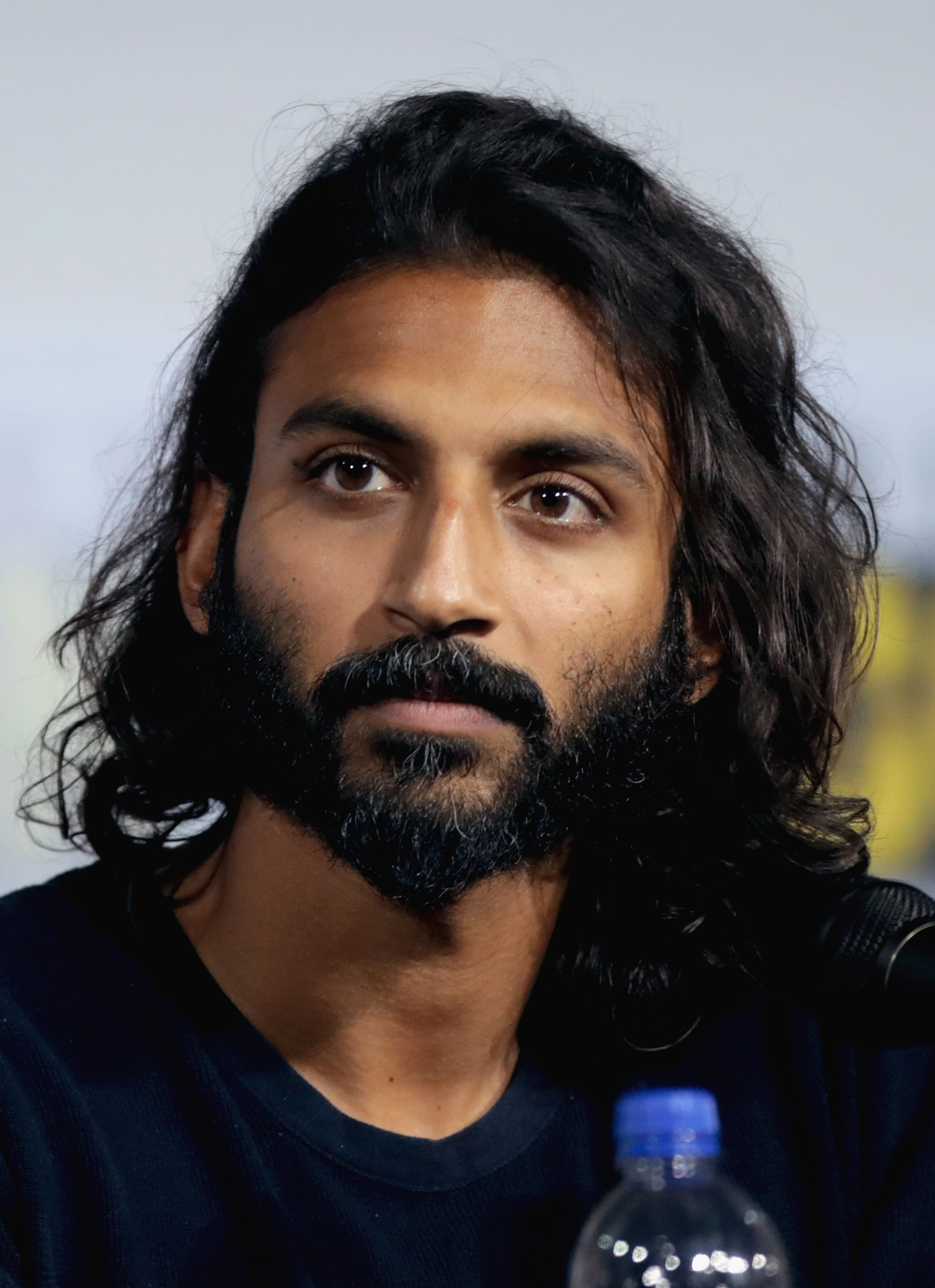
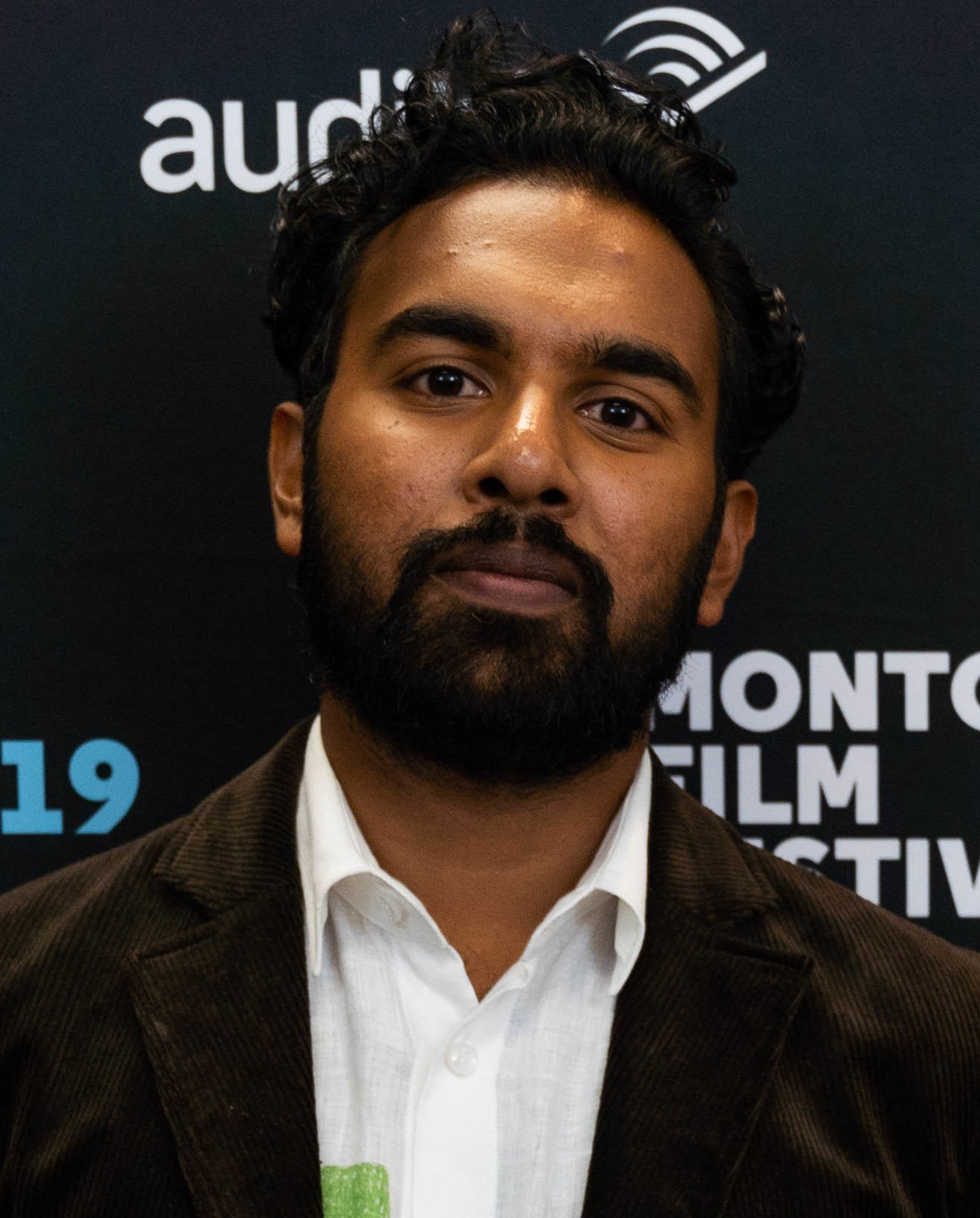
Several characters are played by multiple actors at different layers of simulated reality, such as Avi Nash (left) and Himesh Patel (right) for Joan's boyfriend Krish.

An April 2023 casting announcement for Black Mirror named Annie Murphy, Salma Hayek Pinault, Michael Cera, Himesh Patel, Rob Delaney, and Ben Barnes. The director was Ally Pankiw; she saw diversity of the crew in gender and sexuality as important. Udo Kramer designed sets for all series six episodes. The soundtrack was composed by Ames Bessada, with whom Pankiw had previously worked, and released on 21 July 2023.

Filming took place in September 2022, with "Red Book" used as a codename. An American-style bungalow in Crowthorne, England, was used for exterior filming. The owner Jennifer Johnston purchased it with film production usage in mind. According to Johnston, the production crew—numbering 70—added rock gardens and repainted it, also adding shrubs and American postboxes to neighbouring houses. The Streamberry office used white, black and red colours to evoke the Netflix logo.

Murphy and Pankiw worked on the comedy series Schitt's Creek (2015–2020), which is referenced in the episode's dialogue. Brooker wrote Joan with Murphy in mind, having recently watched the series. He saw her as "likeable yet relatable, goofy, and flawed". Murphy was keen to participate before reading the episode's script. She described being confused at playing herself towards the end of the episode, in contrast to Cera, who seemed to thoroughly understand the story.

Hayek said that playing a fictionalised version of herself allowed for self-deprecation and exploration of people's impressions of her. She had experienced her likeness being used online in "disrespectful ways". Brooker said that they wrote "more tame" lines so as not to "scare her off", but Hayek encouraged "outrageous" dialogue. Hayek suggested use of facts about her in the script, leading to mention of her dyslexia and Roman Catholicism. Murphy said of the scene where her character defecates in a church: "I couldn't be more excited about it and I could picture it". Hayek, however, did question whether she would get in trouble for her role in the episode. During filming, crew adopted pigtails in "solidarity" with Joan, according to Pankiw.

Pankiw believed the episode asked "who gets to make art?" and "what happens when we consume other people's stories?" She saw the perception of women in media by other women as a feminist theme and liked that the episode had prominent female friendships and women seeking autonomy. Murphy found that Joan's cooperation with Hayek made for an "uplifting female empowerment" story.

== Analysis ==
The episode is a comedy: i's Emily Bootle called it one of the "most explicitly funny" installments of the programme. It was considered a cringe comedy and a dark comedy by Time's Judy Berman and Esquire's Emma Stefansky, respectively, and Alex Cranz of The Verge commented that it was "gentler" than other episodes. It was compared to the first episode, "The National Anthem", wherein a prime minister is made to have sex with a pig. "The National Anthem" also had a near-future setting and, according to The Daily Telegraph's Ed Power, "juvenile humour". In The Independent, Nick Hilton said both works were "Orwellian farce".

Black Mirror was released by Netflix from 2016 onwards; it made an interactive film specific to this new medium with Bandersnatch (2018). Streaming services such as Netflix are the subject of "Joan Is Awful", as well as the following episode, "Loch Henry" and season 7 episode, "Hotel Reverie". Richard Lawson, a Vanity Fair critic, saw it as commenting on Netflix's algorithm-led strategy, while Power believed it was about binge-watching. Power said Javadi parodies Bela Bajaria, Netflix's Chief Content Officer, while Joan's life resembles the protagonist of The Truman Show (1998).

Other themes include artificial intelligence (AI) and personalised content. Black Mirror previously explored AI in "Be Right Back", which features a robotic replacement for a grieving woman's dead partner. Amit Katwala analysed that personalised content posed threats to publications such as Wired, which he was writing in, as they rely on common cultural experiences. Katwala suggested that large language models might then generate personalised articles about the personalised content. Privacy was also a motif: Lawson found the episode to satirise nosy neighbours, while Bootle saw it as about Big Brother-style invasion of privacy through data collection.

The episode makes liberal use of Easter egg references to other installments. The song "Anyone Who Knows What Love Is (Will Understand)" by Irma Thomas is heard when Joan meets Mac at a restaurant, marking its sixth use in the programme. The Streamberry platform shows programmes such as Junipero Dreaming—named after "San Junipero"—and Finding Ritman—about Bandersnatch's Colin Ritman. It contains thumbnails for fictional shows seen in other episodes (Sea of Tranquility and Hot Shots), and the cartoon Rowdy and Peanut, named after characters in Brooker's Cat Burglar (2022). Streamberry is also key to the following episode, "Loch Henry", wherein a character produces a documentary—Loch Henry: Truth Will Out—that can be seen on Joan's account.

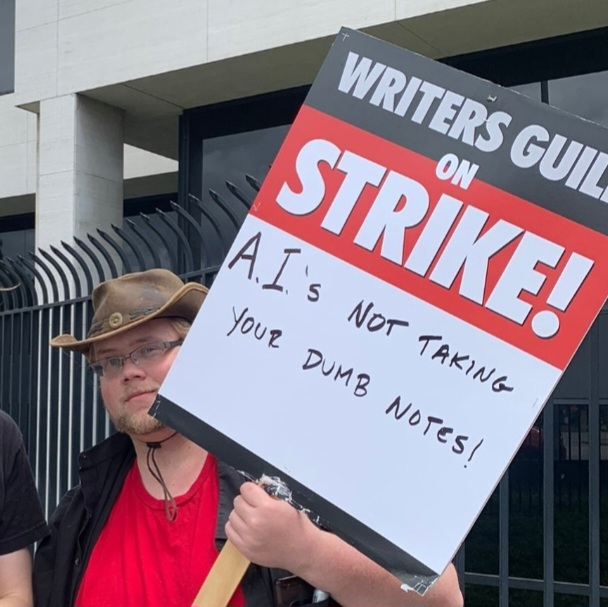
A WGA picketer holds a sign protesting replacement of writers with artificial intelligence.

"Joan Is Awful" was seen as prescient for its portrayal of a television series made with no human input. It was written shortly before the 2023 strikes by the Writers Guild of America (WGA) and actors' union SAG-AFTRA, who negotiated the role of AI in entertainment with the Alliance of Motion Picture and Television Producers (AMPTP). An anonymous SAG-AFTRA member told Deadline Hollywood that actors saw it as "a documentary of the future, with their likenesses sold off and used any way producers and studios want"; WGA members feared job losses from computer-generated scripts. The AMPTP proposed that actors be paid for a day of digital scanning so that their likeness could be used as background characters. In contrast, SAG-AFTRA demanded "informed consent and fair compensation" for use of a person's likeness or performance to be altered with AI. The WGA aimed to prohibit AI's usage in scriptwriting. Pankiw expressed support for the WGA strike when introducing the episode at a live screening.

== Reception ==
Despite an approval rating of 94% based on 17 reviews from Rotten Tomatoes, critical response varied. While Rolling Stone and Salon described it as the best of the sixth series, The Daily Telegraph and The A.V. Club saw it as the worst. It garnered ratings of four out of five stars in Den of Geek and i, three stars in The Independent and Vulture, and two stars in The Daily Telegraph.

Reviewers widely acknowledged the episode as timely for its themes. However, writing in Paste, Leila Jordan did not find it sufficiently "surprising or introspective". Lawson stated that "Loch Henry", a "predictable but compelling thriller", explored the same ideas better. Jordan praised the satire of Netflix. Contrastingly, Cranz questioned the episode's logic, including the appeal of Is Awful series and the nature of the simulated realities. In addition, Mashable's Chris Taylor criticised it as an example of satire enabling "pretty awful things" when the target "learns to play along", comparing it to Mattel's villainous role in Barbie (2023) or the prominence that the politician Boris Johnson gained from appearing on Have I Got News for You (1990–).

Critics such as The A.V. Club's Kayleigh Dray praised the humorous style, with Rolling Stone's Alan Sepinwall describing the church scene as a highlight. In Den of Geek, Alec Bojalad summarised the episode as "cynical, caustic, and even charming", and Melanie McFarland—in Salon—wrote that it was "hilarious, horrifying and left off-center enough from 2023's actuality to be off-putting". Bootle found it to avoid tropes with its "winking sense of humour". However, Power said the episode "isn't nearly as zingingly funny as it thinks it is".

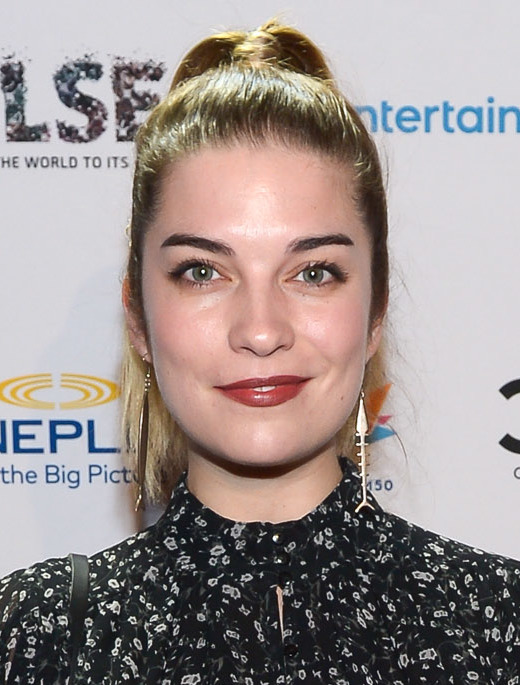
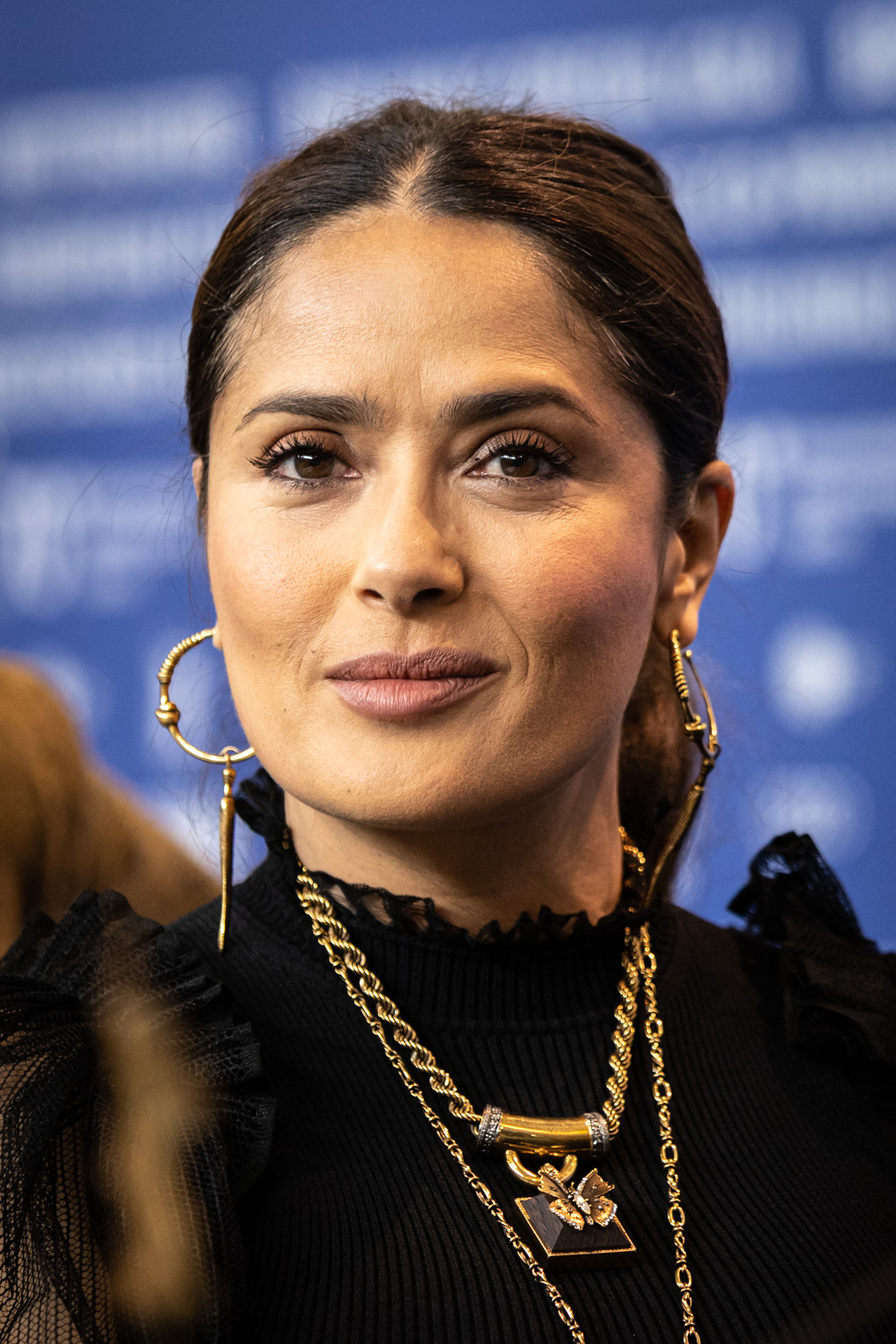
The performances of Annie Murphy (left) and Salma Hayek Pinault (right) were widely praised by reviewers.

The acting was widely acclaimed, particularly that of Murphy and Hayek. Cranz said this was because they had different "comedic energy", so their characters were "brilliant foils". Bootle praised Murphy's "perfect comic timing" and "outrage of a woman coming undone". In a dissenting review for Vulture, Ben Rosenstock found that Hayek "ultimately hurts the story" as her character "distracts from Joan" and is an "odd fit" for the programme. He criticised some of Hayek's jokes as "groaners".

Reviewers were polarised on the episode's pacing and plot. Although Sepinwall approved of the "efficient use" of runtime, Bojalad felt it did not justify Joan's extreme behaviour in a church and Rosenstock said it should have been longer to reduce the exposition in the final 10 minutes. In a rarity for Black Mirror, the ending is positive. Rosenstock lauded it as a "fitting, mercifully happy" conclusion; Dray found the "wildly meta" ending to redeem the "meandering middle" parts. However, Cranz saw it as "a little twee".

At the 4th Critics' Choice Super Awards, "Joan Is Awful" won Best Science Fiction/Fantasy Series, Limited Series or Made-for-TV Movie and Annie Murphy won Best Actress in a Science Fiction/Fantasy Series, Limited Series or Made-for-TV Movie.

=== Episode rankings ===
"Joan Is Awful" placed as follows in critics' ratings of the 28 installments of Black Mirror:

- 7th – Charles Bramesco, Vulture
- 10th – James Hibberd and Christian Holub, Entertainment Weekly
- 11th – Amit Katwala, Matt Reynolds and James Temperton, Wired
- 21st – James Hibbs, Radio Times
- 22nd – Brady Langmann, Esquire
- 22nd – Lucy Ford, Jack King and Brit Dawson, GQ
- 25th – Ed Power, The Daily Telegraph

GamesRadar+ and IndieWire listed the 27 episodes, excluding Bandersnatch, where "Joan Is Awful" placed 7th and 18th, respectively. The New York Observer described it as the second-worst of the five episodes in series six.

== See also ==
- Simone (2002 film), about the creation of a virtual actor
- Inception, a 2010 film about nested layers of dreams
- The Congress (2013 film), about an actor who signs away the rights to her likeness
- Nothing, Forever, a procedurally generated, animated parody of Seinfeld
