= A Little Bit Alexis =

2019 debut single by Annie Murphy

Single by Annie Murphy
- Released: February 27, 2019
- Genre: Pop
- Length: 3:26
- Label: Self-released
- Songwriter(s): Annie Murphy
- Producer(s): Nixon Boyd; Menno Versteeg

"A Little Bit Alexis" is a song performed by Annie Murphy as Alexis Rose on the Canadian sitcom, Schitt's Creek. The song first appeared in the eighth episode of the fifth season, "The Hospies", and was later released commercially as an independent single on February 27, 2019. Partial proceeds from the song were donated to MusiCounts, a Canadian organization providing music resources to schools in need.

== Background and composition ==
"A Little Bit Alexis" was originally written into the script for "The Hospies" without lyrics, which were later written by Murphy by her own request. The track was produced by Murphy's husband Menno Versteeg and his Hollerado bandmate Nixon Boyd. The three were inspired by the music of Paris Hilton, Lindsay Lohan, and Britney Spears. The song became popular on the video-sharing platform TikTok, where fans would lip-sync and perform the original dance from the episode.

== Live performances ==
Murphy performed the song as a duet with Kelly Clarkson on The Kelly Clarkson Show. Clarkson adapted the lyrics as "A Whole Lotta Texas".

== Charts ==
Chart (2020)	Peak position
US Dance/Electronic Digital Songs (Billboard)	21
