= Anyway Gang =

Canadian rock band

- Origin: Toronto, Canada
- Genre: Alternative rock
- Years active: 2018–present
- Label: Royal Mountain
- Spinoff of: Tokyo Police Club; Sloan; Sam Roberts Band; Hollerado
- Members: Dave Monks; Chris Murphy; Sam Roberts; Menno Versteeg

Anyway Gang is a Canadian indie rock supergroup consisting of Sam Roberts, Chris Murphy (from Sloan), Menno Versteeg (from Hollerado), and Dave Monks (from Tokyo Police Club).

== History ==
Anyway Gang formed in the summer of 2018 and released their debut single, "Big Night" in September 2019. Their debut album, Anyway Gang, was released on November 29, 2019, on Royal Mountain Records. Their second album, Still Anyways, was released in June of 2022.

== Discography ==
=== Studio albums ===
| Title | Details |
|---|---|
| Anyway Gang | Released: November 29, 2019; Label: Royal Mountain |
| Still Anyways | Released: May 6, 2022; Label: Royal Mountain |

=== Singles ===
| Title | Year | Peak chart positions | Album |
| Title | Year | CAN Rock | Album |
|---|---|---|---|
| "Big Night" | 2019 | 6 | Anyway Gang |
| "Everybody Cries" | 2019 | — | Anyway Gang |
| "Eyes of Green" | 2020 | 32 | Anyway Gang |
| "Alternate View" | 2022 | 47 | Still Anyways |
| "Out Of Nowhere" | 2022 | — | Still Anyways |
| "Reckless Reckless" | 2022 | 10 | Still Anyways |
| "Real Thing" | 2022 | — | Still Anyways |
