= Hollerado =

Canadian indie rock band

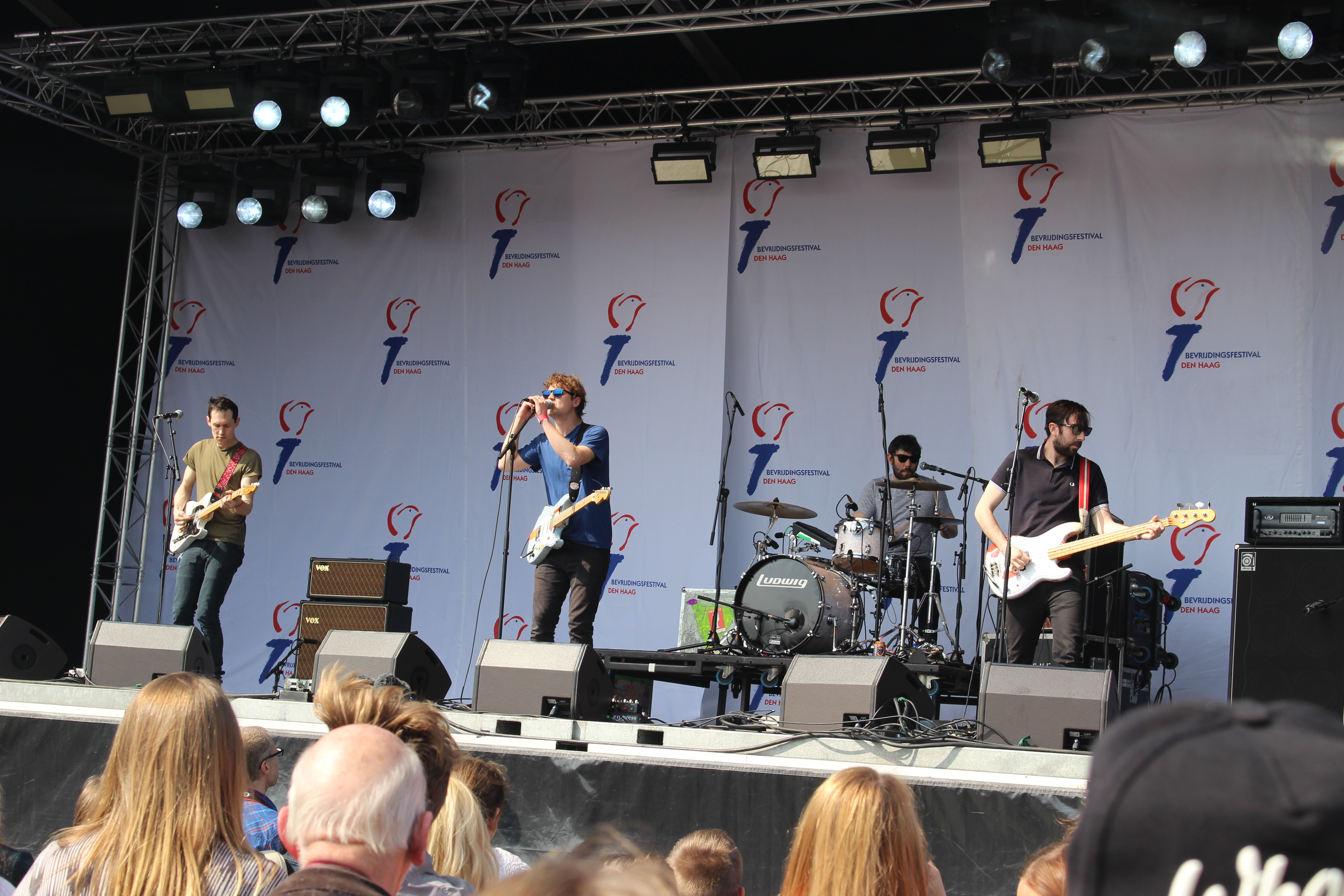
- Hollerado performing at the Liberation Day festival in The Hague, 2014

Background information
- Origin: Ottawa, Ontario, Canada
- Genres: Alternative rock; indie rock; power pop
- Years active: 2007–2019; 2024–present
- Labels: Royal Mountain, Arts and Crafts
- Spinoffs: Anyway Gang
- Members: Dean Baxter; Jake Boyd; Nixon Boyd; Menno Versteeg
- Website: http://www.hollerado.com/

Hollerado is a Canadian indie rock band from Ottawa, Ontario. Formed in 2007, the band consists of Menno Versteeg (lead vocals, guitar), Nixon Boyd (lead guitar, backing vocals), Dean Baxter (bass, backing vocals), and Jake Boyd (drums, backing vocals). Hollerado released four studio albums, before disbanding in 2019. The band initially reunited in 2024 to perform as a one-off opening act for Tokyo Police Club in November, but has fully reunited in 2025.

Hollerado were nominated for awards such as the Juno Award that included Best New Group Award at the 2011 Juno Awards.

== History ==
=== 2007–2012: Formation and Record in a Bag ===
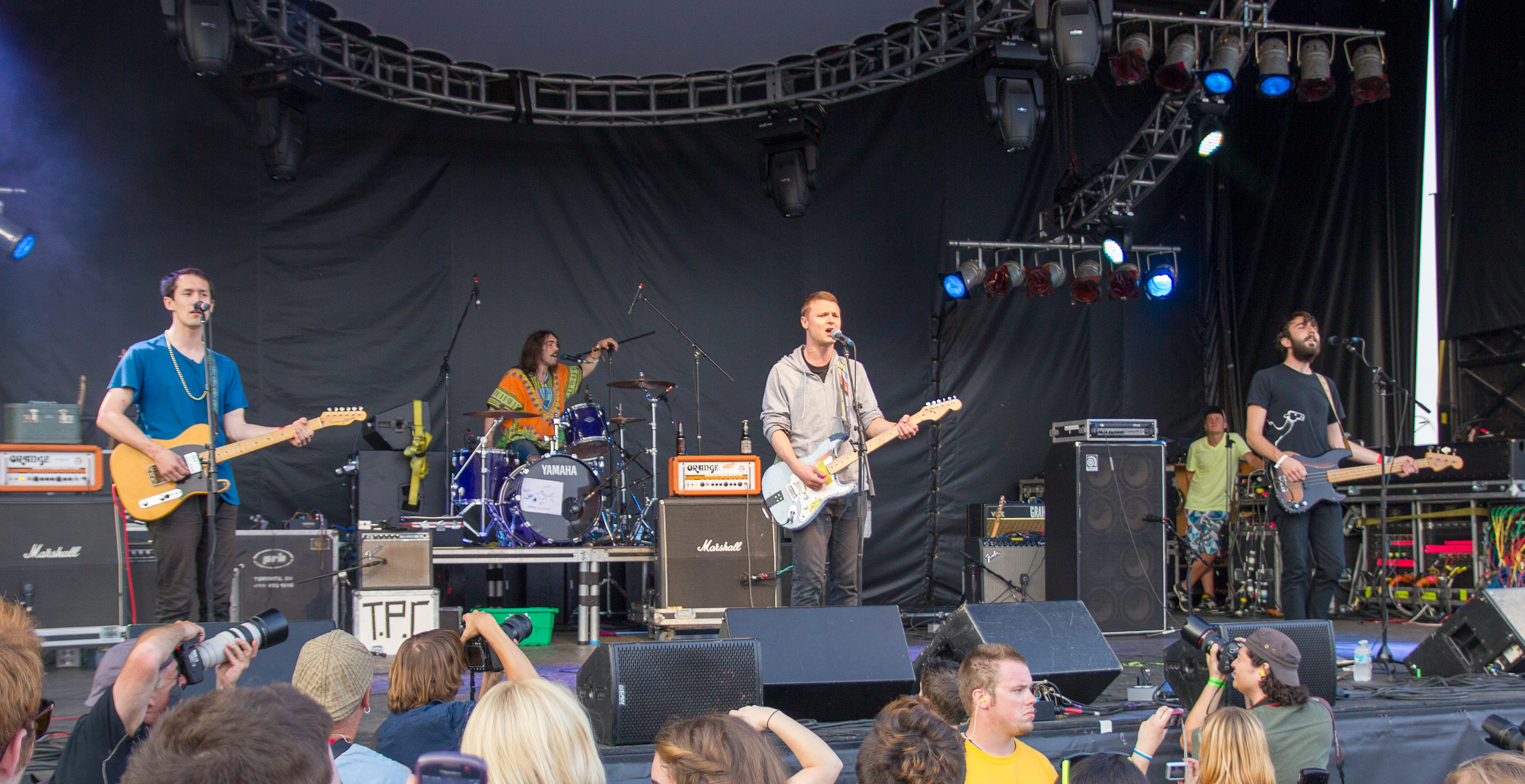
Hollerado performing at Burlington's Sound of Music Festival in 2011

Three of the four members of Hollerado grew up on the same street in Manotick, Ontario, a suburb of Ottawa. Hollerado later recorded and periodically lived in Montreal, Quebec, where they gained attention as one of Montreal's "top up-and-coming bands". The line-up includes lead singer and guitarist Menno Versteeg, lead guitarist Nixon Boyd, bassist Dean Baxter, and drummer Jake Boyd. Since its inception in April 2007, the band has shared the stage with hard-rocker Andrew W.K. and Montreal's The Stills and Malajube, and was hand-picked by Jack White to open for his newest group, The Dead Weather. The band has also played festivals such as SXSW, NXNE, Pop Montreal, Rifflandia Music Festival, and Sled Island in Calgary, Alberta, Canada.

In April and May 2009, the band accompanied The Stills and other Canadian indie rock delegates to the TransmitCHINA conference, an event established to promote cultural and musical exchange between the Asian and Canadian music markets. Hollerado played the conference showcase in Beijing to kick off its two-week tour of China.

In 2009, Hollerado self-released its debut album Record in a Bag as a free digital download. Originally from the band's Demo in a Bag 5 EP. In February 2010, music label Royal Mountain Records along with Arts & Crafts re-released Record in a Bag. The album's lead single "Americanarama" drew press for its music video starring The Kids in the Hall comedian Dave Foley in a parody of American Apparel founder and CEO Dov Charney. The album has been favourably compared to the music of Supergrass, Stephen Malkmus, and Weezer.

In February 2009, Hollerado embarked on a 28-day "residency tour". The band played "seven bars in seven cities seven days a week", visiting T.T. The Bears in Boston, Piano's in New York City, Pipeline Gas Bar in Lacolle, Quebec, Casbah in Hamilton, Sneaky Dee's in Toronto, Cafe Dekcuf in Ottawa, and Barfly in Montreal.

In 2010, Hollerado toured with Free Energy throughout the United States and Canada, as headliner in their home country and as support act in the US. Many of these concerts featured both bands on stage aiding each other in backup vocals on their own songs, and covers of Bruce Springsteen and Neil Young.

In 2011, the band was nominated for the Best New Group Award at the 2011 Juno Awards.

=== 2013–2019: White Paint to Retaliation Vacation and disbandment ===
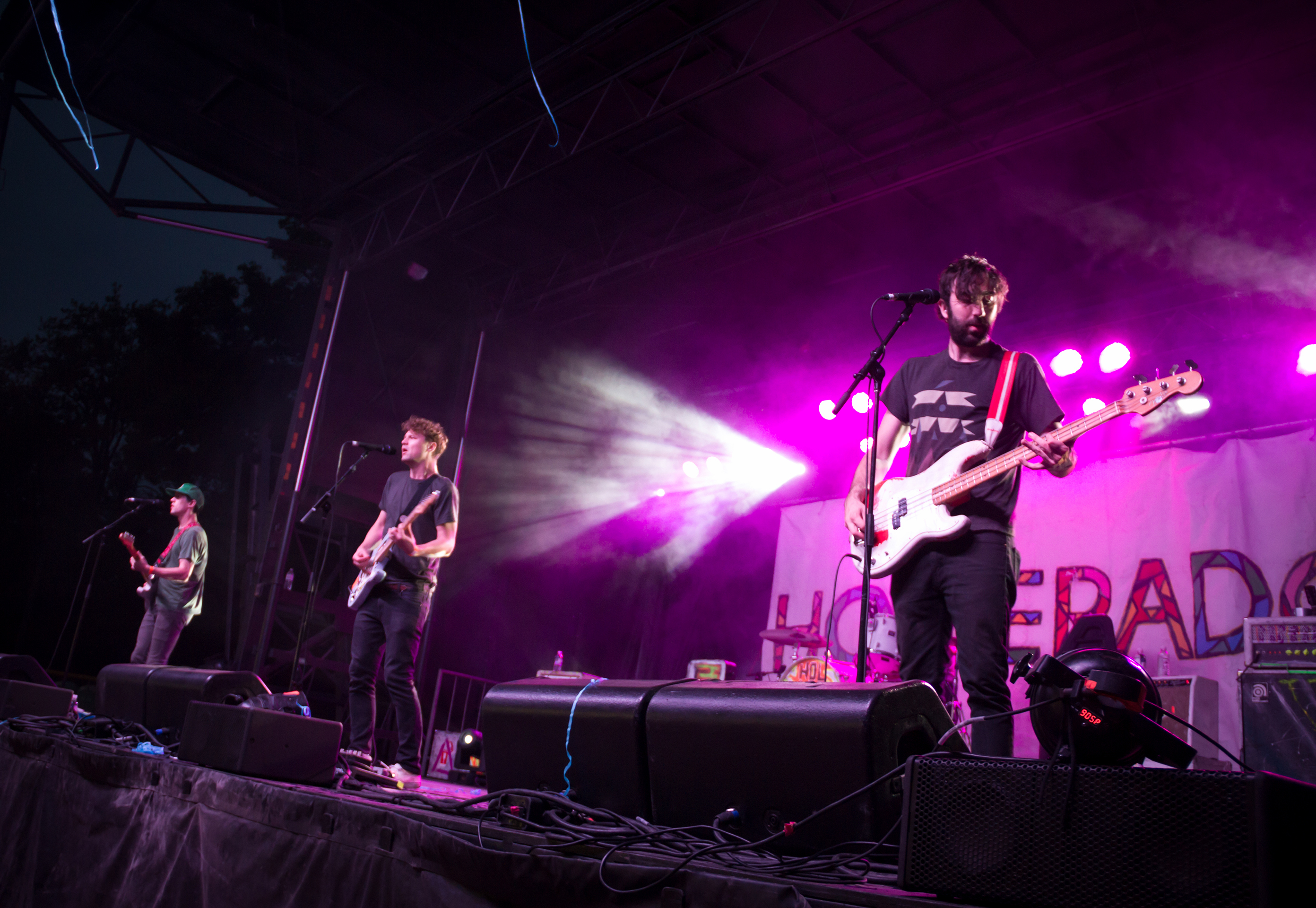
Hollerado performing at Rock the Hills in 2014

On February 26, 2013, the band released their second LP, White Paint, leading with the single "Pick Me Up". The album "finds Hollerado sticking to their guns by packing their songs with instantly hummable choruses and six-string riffs aplenty," but although the band didn't opt for any huge sound changes for their second album, White Paint "is a more intricately wrought and emotionally complex record than the feel-good Record in a Bag". The track "So It Goes", along with its accompanying video, garnered attention for its historical and emotional story that involved the sparing of lead singer Menno's grandfather's life during World War II.

In January 2015, Hollerado began releasing tracks for their ambitious 111 Songs project, leading with the single "Firefly". The project stemmed from a release package ordered by fans of their previous record White Paint on which Hollerado has stated "as part of the deal we would write them a custom song. The idea was the person would send us their name and where they were from and two facts about themselves, and a few months later we would send them a song we wrote for them." 111 Songs actually resulted in two years of work on the songs, dedicated to those fans and is stepping stone to the band's third full-length album.

On January 6, 2017, Hollerado's first single from their third studio album "Born Yesterday" was released. In February and March, they toured the UK with fellow Canadian pop punk outfit, Sum 41 on their "Don't Call It A Sum-Back Tour". Born Yesterday was released on April 14, 2017.

On February 20, 2019, Hollerado announced via a press release that they would be parting ways after releasing one last self-produced album, entitled Retaliation Vacation, and embarking on a final tour titled The One Last Time Tour.

The band played their final shows on December 11, 12 and 13 at the Danforth Music Hall along with an exclusive final performance at the Horseshoe Tavern in Toronto, Canada on December 14, 2019. Corey van den Hoogenband from Exclaim, cited their final performance at the Danforth Music Hall as "the perfect goodbye after a decade full of confetti, white paint and peace signs."

=== 2024–present: Reunion ===
Hollerado reunited in 2024 to support two of Tokyo Police Club's final shows on November 26 and 27 in Toronto. On May 13, 2025, the band announced their official reunion, confirming their plans for new music. On November 4, 2025, Hollerado released an EP entitled Start A Band, marking their first release of new music since their reunion. The band performed as a support act for Billy Talent in Toronto on July 18, 2026.

== Awards and nominations ==
=== Juno Awards ===
Year	Nominee / work	Award	Result
2011	Hollerado	Best New Group	Nominated
2012	Hollerado - Good Day At The Races	Video of the Year	Nominated
2014	Hollerado - White Paint	Recording Package of the Year	Nominated

=== Sirius XM Indie Awards ===
Year	Nominee / work	Award	Result
2012	Hollerado	Live Artist/Group Or Duo of the Year	Nominated
2014	Hollerado	Live Artist/Group Or Duo of the Year	Won
2014	Hollerado	Artist/Group Or Duo of the Year	Nominated
2014	Hollerado - So It Goes	Video of the Year	Nominated

=== Edge 102 CASBY Awards ===
Year	Nominee / work	Award	Result
2013	Hollerado	Favourite Sugar Beach Session	Won

== Band members ==
- Menno Versteeg – lead vocals, rhythm guitar
- Nixon Boyd – lead guitar, backing vocals
- Dean Baxter – bass, backing vocals
- Jake Boyd – drums, backing vocals

== Discography ==
=== Studio albums ===
- Record in a Bag (2009, re-released 2010)
- White Paint (2013)
- Born Yesterday (2017)
- Retaliation Vacation (2019)

=== Demos ===
- Demo in a Bag One (2007)
- Demo in a Bag Two (2007)
- Demo in a Bag Three (2007)
- Demo in a Bag Four (2007)
- Demo in a Bag Five (2008)

=== Other releases ===
- Margaritaville 2: The Reckoning (2011)
- 111 Songs (2015)
- Start A Band (2025)

=== Singles ===
Year	Song	Chart peak		Album
Year	Song	CAN Alt	CAN Rock	Album
2010	"Americanarama"	13	31	Record in a Bag
2010	"Juliette"	6	10	Record in a Bag
2011	"Got to Lose"	18	37	Record in a Bag
2011	"Good Day at the Races"	7	22	Margaritaville 2: The Reckoning
2012	"Pick Me Up"	3	18	White Paint
2013	"So It Goes"	5	23	White Paint
2014	"Desire 126"	16	34	White Paint
2015	"Firefly"	3	21	111 Songs
2017	"Born Yesterday"	3	6	Born Yesterday
2017	"I Got You"	10	28	Born Yesterday
2018	"Eloise"	—	38	Born Yesterday
2025	"What Killed Elvis Presley"	7	×	Start a Band
"—" denotes a release that did not chart. "×" denotes periods where charts did not exist or were not archived.

== See also ==
- Music of Canada
- Canadian rock
- List of Canadian musicians
- List of bands from Canada
