= Royal Mountain Records =

- Founded: 2009
- Genre: Indie rock; power pop; alternative rock; punk rock
- Country of origin: Canada
- Location: Toronto, Canada
- Official website: royalmountainrecords.com

Royal Mountain Records is a Canadian independent record label and artist-management company, based in Toronto, Canada. The Royal Mountain roster currently consists of more than 30 active artists including Alvvays, Mac DeMarco, and U.S. Girls. Their alumni include PUP, Orville Peck and White Reaper.

== History ==
Founded in 2009 by Hollerado front man Menno Versteeg and Adam “Bix” Berger, the label was originally intended as a means to self release Hollerado's debut Record in a Bag (RMR-001). It soon became a platform to launch the careers of other local Toronto artists such as PUP and Alvvays. Upon the success of these releases, the label signed international acts such as Mac DeMarco, Metz and U.S. Girls, while continuing to support local artists such as Calpurnia and Dizzy. Recent additions to the Royal Mountain roster include Shady Nasty, Bad Waitress, Ellis, KOKOKO!, Nap Eyes, and Wolf Parade. In 2018, it was hailed by Now Magazine as one of the strongest rock record labels in Toronto.

=== Mental health initiative ===
In 2019, Royal Mountain Records implemented a mental health fund for the artists signed to the label in order to provide $1,500 (non-recoupable) to put towards their mental health. Royal Mountain is the first label to start a program like this.

== Current roster ==
Alvvays; Anemone; Anyway Gang; Bad Waitress; Boniface; Calpurnia; Cartel Madras; Common Holly; Customer Service; Dizzy; Doomsquad; Ducks Ltd.; Dusted; Ellis; Eliza McLamb; Everett Bird; Gulfer; Gustaf; Hollerado; Homeshake	Islands; Jo Passed; KOKOKO!; Kylie V.; Bells Larsen; Le Ren; Little Junior; Wyatt C. Louis; Mac DeMarco; Mav Karlo; METZ; Nap Eyes; Ought; Pillow Queens; Pottery; Shady Nasty; Sister Ray; TR/ST; TUNS; U.S. Girls; Wild Pink; Wolf Parade

== Awards and accolades ==
=== Juno Awards ===
Year	Nominee/Work	Award	Result
2011	Hollerado	Best New Group	Nominated
2012	Hollerado - "Good Day At The Races"	Video of the Year	Nominated
2014	Hollerado - White Paint	Recording Package of the Year	Nominated
2015	Alvvays - Alvvays	Alternative Album of the Year	Nominated
2015	Alvvays - Alvvays	Breakthrough Group of the Year	Nominated
2015	PUP - Guilt Trip	Video of the Year	Nominated
2015	PUP - PUP	Recording Package of the Year	Nominated
2016	PUP - Dark Days	Video of the Year	Nominated
2018	METZ - Strange Peace	Metal/Hard Music Album of the Year	Nominated
2018	Alvvays	Group of the Year	Nominated
2018	Alvvays - Antisocialites	Alternative Album of the Year	Win
2019	Dizzy	Breakthrough Group Of The Year	Nominated
2019	Dizzy - Baby Teeth	Alternative Album Of The Year	Win
2019	U.S. Girls - In a Poem Unlimited	Alternative Album Of The Year	Nominated

=== Polaris Prize ===
Year	Nominee/Work	Award	Result
2014	PUP - PUP	Polaris Music Prize	Longlist
2015	Alvvays - Alvvays	Polaris Music Prize	Shortlist
2016	PUP - The Dream Is Over	Polaris Music Prize	Shortlist
2017	Mac DeMarco - This Old Dog	Polaris Music Prize	Longlist
2017	TUNS - TUNS	Polaris Music Prize	Longlist
2018	Alvvays - Antisocialites	Polaris Music Prize	Shortlist
2018	U.S. Girls - In A Poem Unlimited	Polaris Music Prize	Shortlist

=== Much Music Video Awards ===
Year	Nominee/Work	Award	Result
2017	PUP - Sleep in the Heat	Video of the Year	Nominated
