= List of songs recorded by Alvvays =

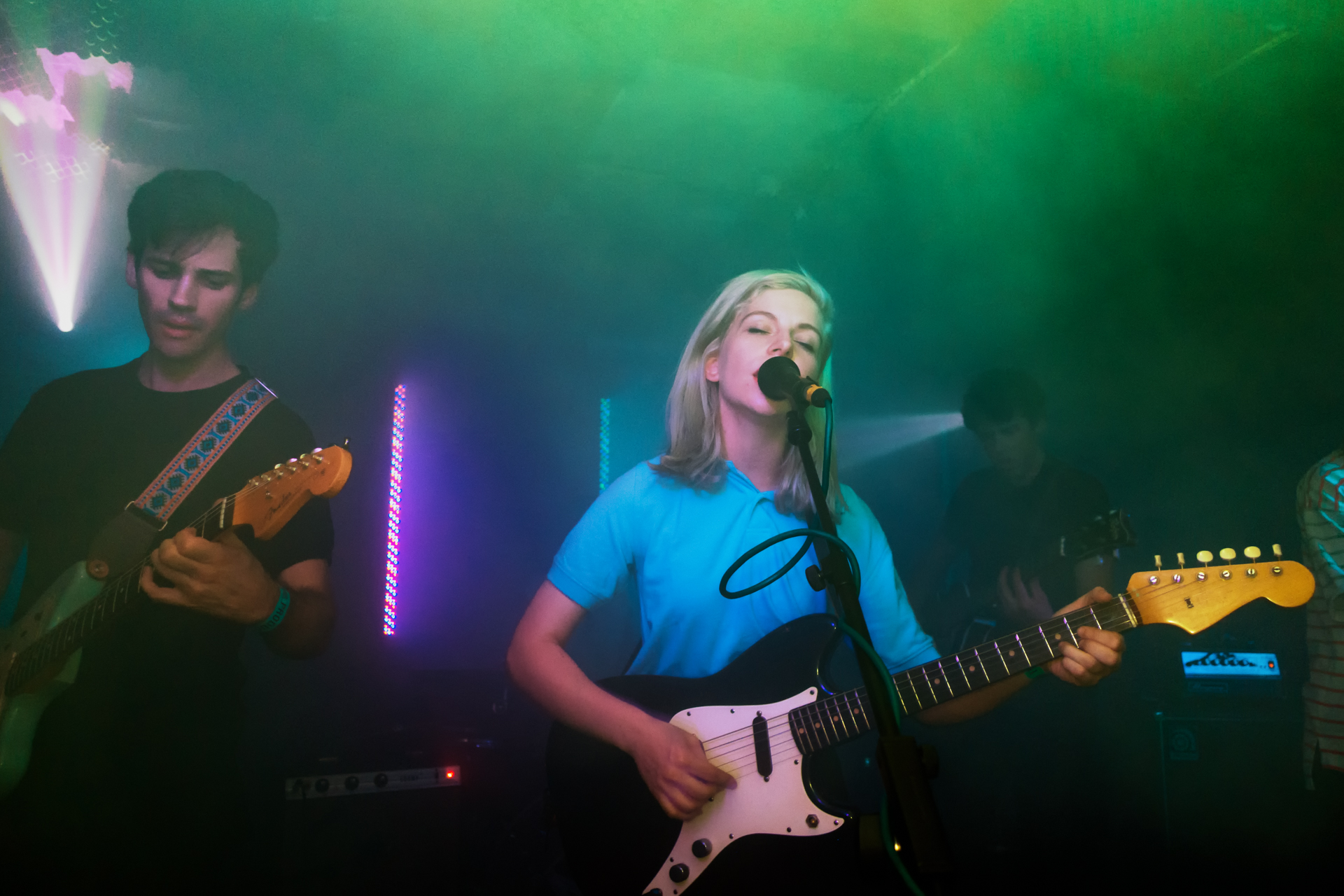
Alvvays in 2014

The Canadian rock band Alvvays has recorded songs for three studio albums, as well as one extended play. This list comprises the band's recorded catalog, which consists of 37 songs.

== Songs ==
Keydan
†	Indicates single release

Name of song, originating album, and year released.
Song	Year	Album	Ref.
"Adult Diversion"	2014	Alvvays	
"After the Earthquake"	2022	Blue Rev	
"The Agency Group"	2014	Alvvays	
"Already Gone"	2017	Antisocialites	
"Archie, Marry Me"	2014	Alvvays	
"Atop a Cake"	2014	Alvvays	
"Belinda Says"	2022	Blue Rev	
"Bored In Bristol"	2022	Blue Rev	
"Dives"	2014	Alvvays	
"Dreams Tonite"	2017	Antisocialites	
"Easy On Your Own?"	2022	Blue Rev	
"Echolalia"	2018	Antisocialites B-Sides	
"Forget About Life"	2017	Antisocialites	
"Fourth Figure"	2022	Blue Rev	
"Hey"	2017	Antisocialites	
"In Undertow"	2017	Antisocialites	
"Lollipop (Ode to Jim)"	2017	Antisocialites	
"Lottery Noises"	2022	Blue Rev	
"Many Mirrors"	2022	Blue Rev	
"Next of Kin"	2014	Alvvays	
"Not My Baby"	2017	Antisocialites	
"Ones Who Love You"	2014	Alvvays	
"Party Police"	2014	Alvvays	
"Pecking Order"	2018	Antisocialites B-Sides	
"Pharmacist"	2022	Blue Rev	
"Plimsoll Punks"	2017	Antisocialites	
"Pomeranian Spinster"	2022	Blue Rev	
"Pressed"	2022	Blue Rev	
"Red Planet"	2014	Alvvays	
"Saved by a Waif"	2017	Antisocialites	
"Supine Equine"	2018	Antisocialites B-Sides	
"Tile By Tile"	2022	Blue Rev	
"Tom Verlaine"	2022	Blue Rev	
"Underneath Us"	2014	Alvvays	
"Velveteen"	2022	Blue Rev	
"Very Online Guy"	2022	Blue Rev	
"Your Type"	2017	Antisocialites	
