= Moshe Fisher-Rozenberg =

Canadian musician

Moshe Fisher-Rozenberg (Memory Pearl)
- Born
- Origin: Toronto, Ontario, Canada
- Genres: Electronic Music • Experimental • Progressive Electronic • Ambient • New Age • Krautrock • math rock • Indie rock • psychedelic rock • art rock • Emo

Moshe Fisher-Rozenberg (also known as Moshe Rozenberg and Michael Rozenberg) is a Canadian musician, composer, and multi-instrumentalist. He has worked in bands such as Newfound Interest in Connecticut, DD/MM/YYYY, and Absolutely Free and has contributed to a range of music projects. He also records under the alias Memory Pearl.

== Early life and career ==
Fisher-Rozenberg's first known band was Newfound Interest in Connecticut, a post-rock/emo group active between 1999 and 2005. The band gained a strong following for their seminal album Tell Me About the Long Dark Path Home (2005), which gained popularity in post-rock and emo revival communities. He later became a member of Viking Club, Germans, DD/MM/YYYY, and Absolutely Free.

== Absolutely Free ==
In 2011, Fisher-Rozenberg co-founded Absolutely Free. The band's self-titled debut album (2014) was longlisted for the Polaris Music Prize and appreciated for its "sonic landscapes", "dreamy indie-pop melodies", and "groovy motorik rhythms". Other releases include the sophomore album Aftertouch (2021), as well as EPs UFO (2012), On the Beach (2013), and Geneva Freeport (2019) - which features vocals from Meghan Remy of U.S. Girls.

== Memory Pearl ==
As Memory Pearl, Fisher-Rozenberg explores ambient electronica. For his debut album, Music for 7 Paintings (2020), he traveled to art galleries throughout North America searching for paintings which he would later translate into sound. Each album track is a direct reference to a single abstract expressionist work by Joan Mitchell, Robert Ryman, Lee Krasner, Helen Frankenthaler, Franz Kline, or Jackson Pollock. Fisher-Rozenberg's approach emphasized the use of sound as a medium for artistic expression, akin to the use of brushstrokes in visual art. In 2020, he collaborated with the Art Gallery of Ontario (AGO) for their AGO Home Stage series, where he performed an exclusive set featuring layers of synths, samples, and live instrumentation.

His sophomore album, Cosmic Astral, reimagines a 1970s music program (playlist) used by music psychotherapists in conjunction with LSD. The originally music program - which featured classical compositions by Richard Strauss, Alexander Scriabin, and Gustav Holst - was removed from therapeutic circulation for being too confrontational and Fisher-Rozenberg sought to re-compose it as something "more delicate and tender" by converting the original scores into MIDI files and manipulating them using a variety of production and compositional techniques. The album features Joseph Shabason, Alvvays guitarist Alec O'Hanley, Sam Prekop, Bram Gielen, Mas Aya and Moritz Fasbender.

The album was featured as Bandcamp's "Album of the Day" on January 17, 2025 and described as exuding "a kind of self-realized warmth". The music has further been described as "sonically pleasing, trippy, and very much a balm for your soul" and as "a soundtrack to the grand disappearance of memory dissolving into the infinite hum of the cosmos".

== Collaborations ==
=== Music collaborations ===
Fisher-Rozenberg's collaborative work includes playing drums and percussion on Youth Lagoon's Savage Hills Ballroom (2015), produced by Ali Chant. Youth Lagoon's song "The Knower", featuring Fisher-Rozenberg's drumming, was featured on the Song Exploder podcast. He also contributed drums and percussion to Alvvays' Antisocialites (2017) and Blue Rev (2022), both of which won Juno Awards, were shortlisted for the Polaris Music Prize, and entered the Billboard 200. The song "Belinda Says" (from the album Blue Rev) was nominated for a Grammy award in 2024. Additionally he contributed drums to noise rock band Child Bite's Monomania EP.

=== Audio/visual collaborations ===
==== Film scores ====
Fisher-Rozenberg has composed film scores for Couplings (2013), Ape Sodom (2016), Two Cares Due None (2016), and Heelers (2017), with Ape Sodom and Two Cares Due None being under the band name Absolutely Free.

==== BRR ====
Together with visual artist Ryan Dodgson, Fisher-Rozenberg formed the project BRR, known for their self-titled book and record set (2012) and cassette release, A Pining (2018). Their projects have been recognized for blending visual art with experimental music.

==== Myriad ====
Fisher-Rozenberg and his wife, visual artist Melissa Fisher-Rozenberg, have an ongoing collaboration project called Myriad, which blends kinetic sculptures with installation art and reel-to-reel loops. In 2014, their first exhibition, at the XPACE Cultural Centre in Toronto, was described as "a succinct immersive installation, the central component being a kinetic sculpture comprised of two juxtaposed reel-to-reel units, wooden gear mechanisms, and a ¼" audio tape loop. A motif comprised of thread is repeatedly installed around the room, recurring throughout the space in the form of collages and printed fabric".

== Personal life ==
Fisher-Rozenberg is a certified music therapist and psychotherapist, practicing in Toronto. He holds a Master of Music Therapy degree from Wilfrid Laurier University and integrates his diverse musical background with his therapeutic practice
