= Easy On Your Own? =

"Easy on Your Own?"

Single by Alvvays

from the album Blue Rev
- Released: August 10, 2022
- Genre: Dream pop; indie rock; shoegaze
- Length: 2:54
- Label: Polyvinyl; Transgressive
- Songwriter: Alvvays
- Producer: Shawn Everett

Alvvays singles chronology
"Pharmacist" (2022)	"Easy on Your Own?" (2022)	"Belinda Says" (2022)

"Easy on Your Own?" is a single by Canadian indie pop band Alvvays, released on August 10, 2022 via Polyvinyl. The song is the second single and second track from Blue Rev (2022).

== Composition and lyrics ==
"Easy on Your Own?" is a dream pop, indie rock and shoegaze song. The track uses audio feedback, distortion, and the glide guitar technique. Molly Rankin's vocals are low in the mix compared to the instrumental.

Publications vary on their interpretation of the lyrics. According to Stereogum, the lyrics of "Easy on Your Own?" are about "feeling disaffected and worrying about the future", while Paste said they "describe a long-term relationship so damaged, it might not be worth saving". Later, in Paste's review of Blue Rev, they wrote the track "neatly blurs the lines between a floundering relationship and the drudgery of our current times". According to Consequence, the lyrics are about "[working] through a breakup". Using the title, Uproxx interpreted the lyrics as Rankin asking if life gets "easier on [her] own". According to Exclaim, the track is an "absolutely devastating account of the aimlessness of early adulthood". According to The Skinny, on the lyrics, Rankin is "wondering aloud whether she is moving through life or life moves around her".

Pitchfork highlighted the following line from the lyrics, since it is representative of one of Blue Rev's themes: "I dropped out / College education's a dull knife / If you don't believe in the lettered life / Then maybe this is our only try." Loud and Quiet highlighted the line "crawling in monochromatic hallways" since it exemplifies the lyrics' strong imagery.

== Reception ==
Stereogum described the track as "fuzzy and satisfyingly blown-out". Paste compared the track to My Bloody Valentine, and praised its complex textures and conciseness.The Fader described the track as a "richly melodic pop jam," and said it sounds darker than the first single, "Pharmacist". According to The Skinny, the track is "peak Rankin". TheNeedleDrop said Rankin's vocals sound "more impassioned" than they were on Antisocialites.

== Charts ==
Chart performance for "Easy On Your Own?"
Chart (2022)	Peak position
Canada Modern Rock (Billboard Canada)	50
US Adult Alternative Airplay (Billboard)	32
