= Black Square (disambiguation) =

Black Square is a 1915 painting by Kazimir Malevich.

Black Square may also refer to:

- Black Square (album), by DD/MM/YYYY, 2009
- Black Square (band), a musical group from Hawaii, United States
- "Black Square", a song by Manic Street Preachers from Futurology
- Black Square (1989 film), by Iosif Pasternak; see 1989 Cannes Film Festival
- Black Square (1992 film), directed by Yuri Moroz
- DJMax Portable Black Square, a 2008 video game

== See also ==
- Blackout Tuesday, a 2020 protest against racism and police brutality where participants posted black squares on social media
