= Tell Me About the Long Dark Path Home =

Studio album by Newfound Interest in Connecticut
- Released: 2005
- Genre: Emo; post-rock; Math rock
- Length: 48:31
- Label: We Are Busy Bodies

Newfound Interest in Connecticut chronology
Less Is More or Less (2002)	Tell Me About the Long Dark Path Home (2005)	The Arctic Circle (2020)

Tell Me About the Long Dark Path Home is the only studio album by Canadian emo band Newfound Interest in Connecticut. It was released in 2005 on the label We Are Busy Bodies.

== Background and release ==
Newfound Interest in Connecticut formed in Toronto in 1999. Their band name was derived from a song by The Get Up Kids. The band released Tell Me About the Long Dark Path Home in 2005 on CD with the Toronto-based label We Are Busy Bodies.

== Music ==
Tell Me About the Long Dark Path Home is an emo and post-rock album with elements of math rock, screamo, and slowcore. The album is characterized by its use of dynamics, varying between calm ambience and noise-filled catharsis. The seven-minute opener track "The Computers Stopped Exchanging Information" has been compared to post-rock band Explosions in the Sky. The track is instrumental, with vocals beginning in the second track, "And Started Sharing Stories". An Exclaim! writer described the album's sound as similar to Braid and Wilco. In terms of mood, the album has been described as evoking a sorrowful and desolate feeling in the listener.

== Reception and legacy ==
In the same year of the album's release, the band had disbanded. The album and the band's other releases saw little impact, however they saw increased popularity in following years, particularly the early 2020s. Other members went onto form and play in bands such as DD/MM/YYYY and Absolutely Free.

Some have considered the album a cult classic. As a result of its renewed popularity, the album was remastered and reissued, receiving its first vinyl release on March 12, 2021, via Busy Bodies. The band reunited at New Friends Fest in 2024 and began to play shows in North America and Europe. One writer for BrooklynVegan claims the album "predicted The World Is a Beautiful Place & I Am No Longer Afraid to Die's first album by about eight years" and said that it stood the test of time.

== Track listing ==
1. "The Computers Stopped Sharing Information" – 7:10
2. "And Started Sharing Stories" – 2:22
3. "And Then They Kissed" – 3:11
4. "Okay, You Can Be Tigers, But No Crashing" – 4:41
5. "Five Years Of Work And We Built That Song" – 3:08
6. "And It Sings For Itself" – 6:12
7. "I Can Hear Your Footsteps Just Outside Camp – Sah, Sah, Sah..." – 7:50
8. "I Can See Your Breath Rising In The Air" – 2:47
9. "On My Back Watching The Northern Lights Recede" – 5:32
10. "The Arctic Circle" – 5:33
