= Pharmacist (song) =

Single by Alvvays

from the album Blue Rev
- Released: July 6, 2022
- Genre: Indie pop; shoegaze; bedroom pop; noise pop
- Length: 2:04
- Label: Polyvinyl; Transgressive
- Songwriter: Alvvays
- Producer: Shawn Everett

Alvvays singles chronology
"Plimsoll Punks" (2017)	"Pharmacist" (2022)	"Easy On Your Own?" (2022)

"Pharmacist" is a single by Canadian indie pop band Alvvays, released on July 6, 2022 via Polyvinyl. The song is the opening track and first single from the band's 2022 album, Blue Rev. The single is the band's first release since 2017's Antisocialites.

== Composition and lyrics ==
"Pharmacist" is an indie pop, shoegaze, bedroom pop and noise pop song. The song ends with a guitar solo, which NME described as "extravagant" and "ripping". The track was compared to My Bloody Valentine's guitar-heavy shoegaze album, Loveless. Lead vocalist Molly Rankin's vocals are low in the mix in comparison to the instrumental.

The song's lyrics tell the story of unexpectedly meeting someone at a pharmacy. NPR wrote the lyrics are "short and memorable, but don't necessarily portray any one narrative". Loud and Quiet described the "vivid details" of the lyrics as creating a "beguiling short story".

== Critical reception ==
Quinn Moreland of Pitchfork gave the song their "Best New Music" accolade. Moreland wrote, "[the song] is overblown in all the right ways, with all the meticulously layered noise growing into a thicket around [Molly] Rankin's tender nostalgia". Stereogum staff ranked the song first in their "The 5 Best Songs of the Week" list for the week of July 8, 2022. They wrote, the song "sounds less like one of the their fully-formed indie-pop songs and more like an appetizer for the album". BrooklynVegan described the song as a "big-sounding first taste of the album".

Paste wrote on the track, the band "[makes] clear their intention to rough things up a bit". Clash described the track as "an expansive opener, with snarling guitars that meld into empyreal enchantment". NME compared the track to previous Alvvays works; they said Molly Rankin's vocals have a newfound clarity and Alec O'Hanley's guitars "swirl with more vengeance and energy than before". BeatsPerMinute called the track a contender for song of the year. They wrote, the track's "distortion and dreaminess is amped up from Antisocialites".
