= Belinda Says =

Single by Alvvays

from the album Blue Rev
- Released: September 22, 2022
- Length: 2:46
- Label: Polyvinyl; Transgressive
- Songwriter: Alvvays
- Producer: Shawn Everett

Alvvays singles chronology
"Easy On Your Own?" (2022)	"Belinda Says" (2022)	"After the Earthquake" (2022)

"Belinda Says" is a single by Canadian indie pop band Alvvays, released on September 22, 2022 via Polyvinyl. The song is the third single from the band's 2022 album, Blue Rev.

== Composition and lyrics ==
"Belinda Says" pays tribute to Belinda Carlisle, vocalist for the Go-Go's, and is about finding freedom in music. Vocalist Molly Rankin stated the song "was a vision of someone escaping a situation, flipping on the radio... It just creates this beautiful image of a joyous exodus." She expounded upon the song's themes in a Stereogum piece, remarking: "A thing that I think is really beautiful is hearkening back to a day where the radio is your friend. [...] You feel like they’re keeping you company. To embody the view of "Belinda Says" — it's like, 'If Belinda Says this, then it must be true.'" Rankin first developed the tune while jamming in her basement; she equated it "unleash[ing] my inner Morrissey". She considered it the most profound song on Blue Rev.

The song quotes Carlisle's 1987 song "Heaven Is a Place on Earth". Guitarist Alec O'Hanley, who first envisioned the song with a more country sound, came up with the idea to reference the song directly. He was particularly taken with the song during a bicycle ride under the influence of psilocybin: "[I] just was wowed by the beauty of 'Heaven Is a Place on Earth.' I had the thought that it should be played instead of national anthems at hockey games and stuff. Instead of a patriotic thing, more of an internationalist, humanist thing. I think it's this sneaky, secular, utopian anthem that people don't quite realize."

== Critical reception ==
The song debuted on September 22, 2022 as a joint single with album track "Very Online Guy". To promote the song, the group performed the tune on KEXP, The Tonight Show Starring Jimmy Fallon, CBS Saturday Morning, and NPR's Tiny Desk Concert.

Rachel Brodsky at Stereogum observed that, along with other pre-release singles from Blue Rev, the song "captures the group’s 12-string shimmer while layering on wall-of-sound feedback, dizzy synth effects, and cymbal-soaked drumming. Every track sounds like it’s rushing towards you, but nothing sounds rushed." At MTV, Patrick Hosken viewed it as "one of the most moving songs I’ve ever heard," calling it "as hopeful as a winter sunrise [...] it's a beautiful and jarring bit of pop music that sounds like a cassette warping in a malfunctioning Walkman." Jacob Ganz of NPR called it "pinnacle of the band's dynamic new method," likening it to a sequel to the band's own "Archie, Marry Me": "You can hear the carefree sailing of "Archie" collapse into a story of uncautious young love that can't manage to steer away from the rocks." Paste's Ben Salmon considered it "perfect," while Spin's Bobby Olivier found it "hooky" but "too scuffed up by heavy guitar fuzz."

Jeremy Gordon of The New York Times wrote that "the track encapsulates the band’s strengths: plaintive and distinct lyrics, keening melodies, waves and waves of sugar-flecked white noise that envelop without overwhelming, a triumphant guitar solo that hoists the song toward an ascendant climax." The Los Angeles Times singled the song out while ranking its parent album among the year's best, while Pitchfork placed the song at the top of its 2022 list. Writer Jamieson Cox praised the song:

Alvvays frontwoman Molly Rankin recently cited the Canadian short story master Alice Munro as an influence, noting the way the writer’s work can “knock the wind out of you.” Rankin and her band offer their own bracing wallop with "Belinda Says," a heartbreaking sketch of an unexpected pregnancy that’s also a modern power-pop classic. She only needs one line to render vivid scenes: a warm vodka cooler chugged behind a hockey rink, a tense phone call with a would-be father, a forlorn move to the countryside soundtracked by Belinda Carlisle’s "Heaven Is a Place on Earth." Like a heroine in one of Munro's timeless stories, the narrator’s life is altered forever by a single choice of impossible magnitude.

Carlisle herself loved the song, posting online that she was flattered.

== Awards and nominations ==
The song was nominated for Best Alternative Music Performance at the 66th Annual Grammy Awards.
