= In Undertow =

2017 song by indie pop band Alvvays

Single by Alvvays

from the album Antisocialites
- Released: June 6, 2017
- Genre: Indie pop; shoegaze; noise pop
- Length: 3:17
- Label: Royal Mountain; Polyvinyl; Transgressive
- Songwriter(s): Alec O'Hanley; Molly Rankin
- Producer(s): Alec O'Hanley; John Congleton

Alvvays singles chronology
"Next of Kin" (2014)	"In Undertow" (2017)	"Dreams Tonite" (2017)

"In Undertow" is a song by Canadian indie pop band Alvvays. It was released on June 6, 2017 as the lead single from the band's second studio album, Antisocialites.

== Background ==
The song, which opens its parent album, introduces a "fantasy breakup arc" wherein the narrator mulls over the end of a relationship. In the bridge, singer Molly Rankin asks, "What’s next for you and me?" She uses nautical imagery—"you find a wave and try to hold on for as long as you can", or a current of undertow—to depict mistakes made. The song's chorus repeats the refrain "There's no turning back after what's been said." One verse ends with the couplet: "Can't buy into astrology, and won’t rely on the moon for anything."

When asked about how she developed the song, Rankin replied, "I was wobbling along a shore picking up stained glass, which is just something I really love. I have many glass bottles of it in my apartment of all different colors and I kind of just came up with the melody." The song contains backing vocals and additional guitar from Norman Blake of Scottish power pop progenitors Teenage Fanclub, one of the band's professed influences. The work of Dolly Mixture influenced the song as well. The opening keyboard in the intro is pulled from a demo the band recorded in their Toronto rehearsal space.

== Music video ==
The song's music video was directed by Jo Garrity, and released on July 13, 2017. The clip contains shots of the band awash in analog video effects. Rankin emerges in an astronaut helmet and sings over kaleidoscopic visuals. Rankin characterized it as "aquacosmic psych meets public access TV [...] I'm aware of my own drowning fixation and fascinated by that bizarre lunar-tidal relationship. We’ve already filled our water video quota. Space is a trippier ocean." The video won the award for Best Editing in a Music Video at the New York City Independent Film Festival 2017.

== Reception ==
The band first began teasing the song the week before its release; fans used Shazam to identify the song's title before it was officially announced. The band promoted the song with performances on WXPN's World Cafe and on CBS This Morning.

Stuart Berman from Pitchfork writes: "If [the song] is shrouded in confusion and doubt, Alvvays never second-guess their core strength: anthemic, arm-swaying hooks that aim for the stars even when the sky is gray." Readers of the publication ranked it among the best songs of 2017. Stereogum's James Rettig felt that it "contains all of the elements that were initially so charming about the Toronto five-piece blown up to fuzzy and dreamy new heights." Gabe Cohn from Vulture observed that "The band has kept their rivers of reverb, which sometimes makes them sound as though they’re playing to an empty middle-school gymnasium, an image that fittingly blends sweetness with melancholy." AllMusic's Tim Sendra observed that "The pain seeps out of songs like "In Undertow" [...] the album is heavy with break-up songs and she captures the varying moods of a break-up with surgical precision." Mike Katzif from NPR considered it a "darker spiritual sequel" to "Archie, Marry Me". Malcolm Jack of The Guardian characterized it as "an addictive shoegazey swirl of Farfisa and feedback."
