= Dreams Tonite =

2017 song by indie pop band Alvvays

Single by Alvvays

from the album Antisocialites
- Released: July 25, 2017
- Genre: Dream pop
- Length: 3:16
- Label: Royal Mountain; Polyvinyl; Transgressive
- Songwriters: Alec O'Hanley; Molly Rankin
- Producers: Alec O'Hanley; John Congleton

Alvvays singles chronology
"In Undertow" (2017)	"Dreams Tonite" (2017)	"Plimsoll Punks" (2017)

"Dreams Tonite" is a song by Canadian indie pop band Alvvays. It was released on July 25, 2017 as the second single from the band's second studio album, Antisocialites.

== Background ==
"Dreams Tonite" forms the basis of the album's "fantasy breakup arc," with the protagonist questioning whether or not they would still be attracted to their significant other if meeting in the present, rather than the past. The song first became a part of the group's live setlist in early 2016. The band debuted the song online as a pre-release single for Antisocialites on July 25, 2017. The band promoted the song with a performance on CBS Sunday Morning in the U.S. "Dreams Tonite" became one of the band's most popular tunes; as of September 2024, the song has over 105 million streams on Spotify.

== Music video ==
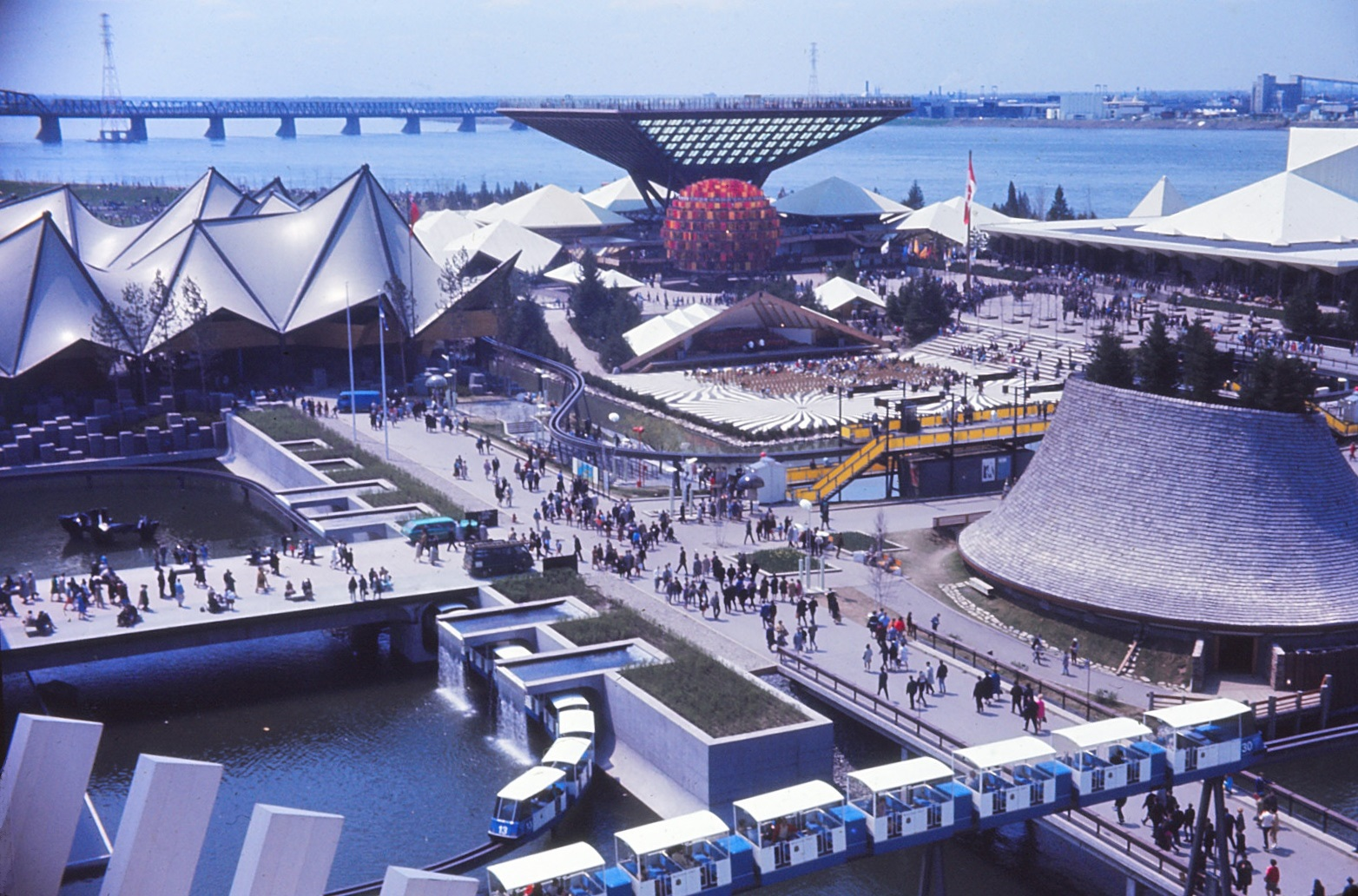
The song's music video utilizes stock footage of Expo 67.

The song's retro-futuristic music video was directed by Matt Johnson, and uses archival footage of Montreal's 1967 International and Universal Exposition. It was released on September 13, 2017. In the clip, the band's members are inserted into the footage digitally. Mark Byrnes of Bloomberg described the proceedings: "While "visiting" Expo, the members ride the automated Minirail, gape at Buckminster Fuller's geodesic dome, and perform on an outdoor stage for fairgoers." The band were pleased with the video, given their disdain for the format, especially due to their respect for Johnson.

== Reception ==
Amanda Wicks from Pitchfork suggested the song "looks at the liminal space between [...] two frames of mind, questioning the forces that separate lovers, be they self-made or circumstantial." Its readers polled the song among the year's overall best. Tim Sendra from AllMusic praised the "lovely new wave ballad" for "its melancholy nostalgia." Randall Colburn at Consequence called the song "relentless in its romanticism," while Anna Gaca of Spin dubbed it "light, literal dream pop that’s almost too pure for this world." Mike Gatzig of NPR found the tune "sleek and gauzy," while Ethan Sapienza of Vulture found the song "somber", if "slightly clichéd".

== Certifications ==
Certifications for "Dreams Tonite"
Region	Certification	Certified units/sales
Canada (Music Canada)	Gold	40,000^{‡}
^{‡} Sales+streaming figures based on certification alone.
