= Adult Diversion =

Single by Alvvays

from the album Alvvays
- B-side: "Underneath Us"
- Released: October 28, 2013
- Recorded: March 2013
- Studio: Yoko Eno, Calgary, Alberta, Canada
- Genre: Indie pop; dream pop
- Length: 3:28
- Label: Royal Mountain; Polyvinyl; Transgressive
- Songwriters: Brian Murphy; Alec O'Hanley; Molly Rankin
- Producer: Chad VanGaalen

Alvvays singles chronology
"Archie, Marry Me" (2013)	"Adult Diversion" (2013)	"Next of Kin" (2014)

"Adult Diversion" is a song by Canadian indie pop band Alvvays. The song was released on October 28, 2013 as the second single from their eponymous debut album. Written by vocalist and guitarist Molly Rankin, guitarist Alec O'Hanley, and bassist Brian Murphy, it is sung from the perspective of a lover who develops an "unhealthy fixation" on their partner.

The song was produced by Chad VanGaalen and recorded at his studio, Yoko Eno, in Calgary, Alberta. It was accompanied by a music video, filmed on a Super 8 camera, featuring footage of the band performing and hanging out at the beach. "Adult Diversion" was the second song the band released; it debuted digitally via the band's website before the band was signed to a label. In the band's home country, it was later released on Royal Mountain Records; in the U.S. and Europe, it was distributed through Polyvinyl and Transgressive Records, respectively.

== Background ==
The song was born out of Rankin's boredom while working at a smoothie hut in Toronto, where the band had recently relocated. "Only one or two people would come in during the day and usually only to use the washroom. That song spawned out of admiration from afar and spending a large chunk of time alone." Exclaim! contributor Sarah Greene described it as "a love song written from the perspective of a drunk stalker."

== Reception ==
"Adult Diversion" was instrumental in developing momentum for the group, who signed to Canadian indie label Royal Mountain a month after the single's release in October 2013. They were subsequently signed to US-based Polyvinyl Records, who released a 7" record of "Adult Diversion", with "Archie, Marry Me" on the A-side, exclusively to mail-order subscribers.

Simon Vozick-Levinson from Rolling Stone called the track an "instant rush of jangly emotion," while Stuart Berman at Pitchfork also complimented its "buoyant surf-tingled jangle." Sam Willett at Consequence of Sound dubbed the tune a "whimsical dream jam" that reaches "staggering highs"; he praised its "perfectly-sewn guitar arrangements and sweet female vocals." Gabrielle Sierra, writing for Billboard called the single catchy, highlighting its "dreamy, deadpan vocals and retro sound."

== Track listing ==
=== Cassette ===
No.	Title	Length
1.	"Adult Diversion"	3:28
2.	"Underneath Us"	2:39

== Personnel ==
Credits adapted from Alvvays's liner notes.

Alvvays

- Molly Rankin - guitar, vocals, songwriting
- Alec O'Hanley – guitar, vocals, keyboards, additional mixing
- Brian Murphy – bass guitar
- Chris Dadge – drums

Production

- Chad VanGaalen – producer, recording engineer, programmer, tambourine, bongos
- Graham Walsh – additional tracking
- Jeff McMurrich – additional tracking
- John Agnello – mixing
- Ian McGettigan – additional mixing
- Greg Calbi – mastering engineer
- Steve Fallone – additional mastering
