= Black Square (album) =

Studio album by DD/MM/YYYY
- Released: 2009
- Recorded: Toronto, Boombox Studios, 2008
- Genre: Rock, Punk, Pop
- Label: Invada Records (Europe), We Are Busy Bodies (Canada), Impose Records (United States), Deleted Art (Europe)
- Producer: Roger Leavens, DD/MM/YYYY

Singles from Black Square
- 1. "Infinity Skull Cube"; 2. "Digital Haircut"; 3. "Bronzage"

Professional ratings
Review scores
Source	Rating
Pitchfork Media	(6.6/10) link
Rockfeedback link	4/5 stars
dose.ca	4/5 stars
Eye Weekly	4/5 stars
Metronews.ca	3.5/5 stars
Aurualstates.com	(no rating) link
Inyourspeakers.com	(no rating) link

Black Square is an album by the group DD/MM/YYYY. In 2009, it was released in Canada (We Are Busy Bodies) on March 17; in Europe (Deleted Art) on August 18; in the United States (Impose Records) on September 15); and in the UK/EU (Invada Records) in September 2010.

== Track listing ==
All songs written by Claxton, Del Balso, Holmes, King, Rozenberg

1. "Bronzage" (3:49)
2. "No Life" (2:19)
3. "They" (2:48)
4. "Infinity Skull Cube" (3:22)
5. "My Glasses" (1:06)
6. "Birdtown" (3:42)
7. "Sirius B" (3:50)
8. "Lismer" (2:09)
9. "Real Eyes" (3:43)
10. "$50,000 Guitar Head" (1:39)
11. "I'm Still in the Walls" (3:29)
12. "Digital Haircut" (3:48)
13. "Van Tan" (3:40)*
- Track 13 is exclusive to the Impose Records American Tape Cassette version of Black Square and originally released on the sold out 7-inch.

== Release show ==
The album release party was held at Lee's Palace in Toronto and featured Black Feelings, Metz and a cover of the DD/MM/YYYY song "Super VGF" by The Meligrove Band.

== Song reviews ==
Chart Attack.ca gave a positive review and link to Infinity Skull Cube's animated music video by Jesi the Elder.

Pitchfork gave Bronzage a 7 saying

"Bronzage", the opening track on their newest album Black Square, sprints forth with chiming guitars, call-and-response chants, and quick, precise beats.

== Charts ==
DD/MM/YYYY's Black Square made Canadian Charts force field PR says

"....originally releasing Black Square in Canada in April — where it reached number two on the Canadian Campus & Community Radio Charts — "
