= Absolutely Free (band) =

Canadian indie rock band

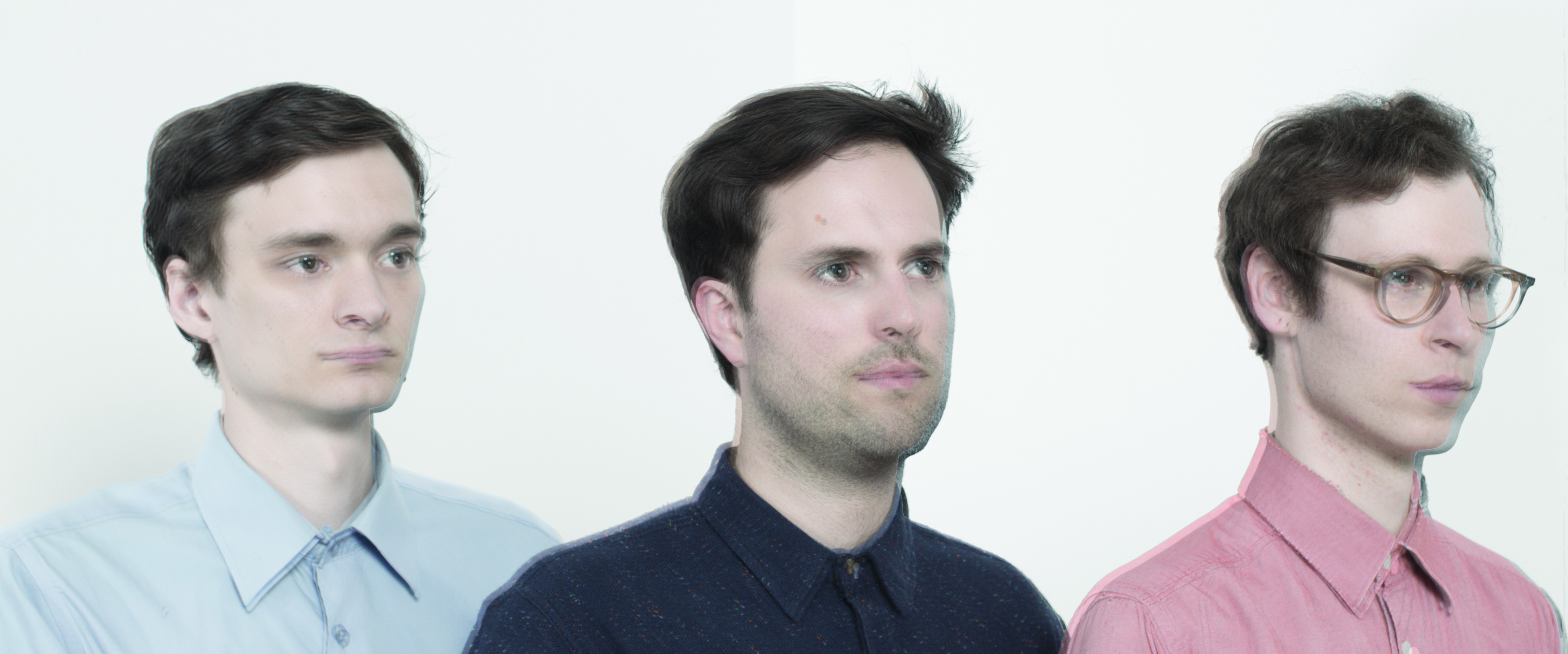
- Left to right: Claxton, King, Fisher-Rozenberg

Background information
- Origin: Toronto, Ontario, Canada
- Genres: Indie rock; psychedelic rock; art rock
- Years active: 2011–present
- Spinoff of: DD/MM/YYYY
- Members: Mike Claxton; Matt King; Moshe Fisher-Rozenberg
- Past members: Jordan Holmes

Absolutely Free is a Canadian indie rock band formed by bassist Mike Claxton, guitarist Jordan Holmes, singer/multi-instrumentalist Matt King and drummer Moshe Fisher-Rozenberg after the breakup of their prior band, DD/MM/YYYY.

== History ==
Claxton, Holmes, King and Fisher-Rozenberg formed Absolutely Free in 2011 after the breakup of their prior band DD/MM/YYYY. The band released their debut EP UFO/Glass Tassel in 2012, followed by On The Beach/Clothed Woman, Sitting EP the next year, as limited-run 12" records.

By 2014, Holmes had left the band; Absolutely Free released their debut full-length album Absolutely Free. with Arts & Crafts in Canada, and Lefse Records in all other territories. The band performed throughout North America opening for Canadian band, Alvvays, and Europe with Preoccupations. The album was a long-listed nominee for the 2015 Polaris Music Prize. The band's song My Dim Age has been used as the theme music for the CBC Radio Show, Out In The Open since 2016.

In 2019, the song, Currency, was used in episode 2 of The CW television series, Batwoman.

== Media projects ==
Absolutely Free is known to work on projects outside traditional music performance and has collaborated with a diverse range of artists and musicians for their live and media-based projects.

In 2013, they developed a site-specific sound installation, On The Beach, on Toronto Island as part of the Camp Wavelength festival. That same year, they created a theatre performance for Summerworks Festival, where they performed a series of one minute songs to a single person at a time for the duration of the event.

In 2014, the band debuted their self-titled album as part of a live event at Bloor Cinema in Toronto by projecting holograms of themselves performing the songs live at a concert they were playing in Hamilton, Ontario at the same time.

In 2015, the band was commissioned to re-score a number of Norman McLaren NFB short films that were subsequently performed live as part of TIFF.

In 2016, Absolutely Free scored the music for a feature Independent film, Two Cares, Due None and the short film, Ape Sodom.

The band has also collaborated with a number of artists to create videos for their music.

- UFO - Video by Lindsey Hogan / Exploding Motor Car (2012)
- Beneath The Air - Video by Jesi The Elder (2014)
- Vision's - Video by Scott Cudmore (2015)
- The Sun A'int Gonna Shine (Anymore) - Video by Petrina Ng (2017)
- Still Life - Video is an edit of The Future Is A Distorted Landscape by Christina Battle (2018)
- Currency (extended mix) - Dir. Rachelle Walker (2019)
- Geneva Freeport - Video by Julie Reich (2019)

== Discography ==
Year	Details	Format	Record label
2012	UFO/Glass Tassel	12" EP	One Big Silence
2013	On The Beach/Clothed Woman, Sitting	12" EP	One Big Silence Lefse Records
2014	Absolutely Free.	CD, 12" LP	Arts & Crafts Lefse Records
2017	The Sun Ain't Gonna Shine (Anymore)	Flexidisc	Boiled Records
2019	Geneva Freeport	12" EP	Idee Fixe Records
2020	Two Cares Due None (Original Motion Picture Soundtrack)	Digital LP	Boiled Records
2021	Aftertouch	LP	Boiled Records

Singles

- Don't Freak Out - Remix of Win-Win (2015)
- Hot Dreams - Absolutely Free Dub Mix - Remix of Timber Timbre (2015)
- Still Life (2018)
- Currency (Extended Mix) ft. U.S. Girls (2019)

Compilations

- Milkin It In Utero Tribute Cassette (2013, Hand Drawn Dracula)
- The Space Project 5 x 7" Record (2014, Lefse Records)
