= DD/MM/YYYY =

Canadian band

- Origin: Toronto, Ontario, Canada
- Genres: Experimental rock; math rock
- Years active: 2003–2011
- Labels: Invada Records (UK/EU); We Are Busy Bodies (CAN); IMPOSE Records (US); Deleted Art (SWE); Out of Touch (CAN); Itchy Roof Records (CAN)
- Spinoffs: Absolutely Free
- Past members: Tomas Del Balso; Mike Claxton; Jordan Holmes; Matt King; Michael Rozenberg; Sean Champion; Jonathan Macias; Heather Curley
- Website: DD/MM/YYYY

DD/MM/YYYY (pronounced "day month year") was a Canadian experimental rock band from Toronto, Ontario, Canada. They were known for their abstract music, use of unconventional instruments, use of complex time signatures, and their rotating member roles.

The nature of DD/MM/YYYY's music was explained as "a mess of spastic, specially challenged art rock with jagged, diamondback guitars, '80s video game synthesizers, and drums that roll with all the punches of the discordant dreamy vocals" and self-described as "always changing and always moving".

== Career ==
The band was formed from ex-members of Toronto bands Plant the Bomb, The Viking Club and The Newfound Interest in Connecticut.

On 17 March 2009, DD/MM/YYYY released their third and final album, Black Square. The album garnered much national, and international press for the band. The Canadian Dose Magazine gave it 4/5 stars and described the album along its enigmatic terms saying: "Black Square bends time and space, trapping you in a dense mesh of punk noise and math rock that will stay imprinted in your neural pathways long after the album’s final coda." The band also embarked on two 5-week European tours and two 60-date North American tours in support of the album.

DD/MM/YYYY toured with Crystal Castles, Don Caballero, sBACH, These Arms Are Snakes, and Japanther. They've also performed at South by South West Music Festival in Austin, Texas three times (2008, 2009, and 2010).

In 2010, the band traveled to Hong Kong to play at the Music Matters conference.

The band was chosen by Portishead to perform at the ATP I'll Be Your Mirror festivals they curated in July at London's Alexandra Palace and in September in Asbury Park, New Jersey.

DD/MM/YYYY played their final show on 11 November 2011 at 918 Bathurst Centre in Toronto. On 17 November, four of the five members debuted their new band Absolutely Free at the M For Montreal Festival.

== Members ==
- Mike Claxton — bass guitar, synthesizers, clarinet
- Tomas Del Balso — vocals, guitars, drums
- Jordan Holmes — synthesizers, guitars
- Matt King — vocals, synthesizers, drums, saxophone
- Moshe Rozenberg — drums, synthesizers

== Discography ==
=== Studio albums ===
- Blue Screen of Death (2005, We Are Busy Bodies)
- Are They Masks? (2007, We Are Busy Bodies)
- Black Square (2008, We Are Busy Bodies, Invada Records)

=== Singles ===
- Imagine! from Are They Masks? Music video by Humble Empire Imagine!
- Infinity Skull Cube from Black Square Music video by Jesi The Elder
- Digital Haircut from "Black Square" Music Video by Humble Empire
- I'm Still In The Wall from "Black Square" Music Video by Exploding Motor Car
- 777inch released on Out Of Touch Records

== Television appearances ==
- MTV Live Canada
- Dutch National TV (NOS)
