= Alvvays (album) =

Studio album by Alvvays
- Released: July 22, 2014
- Recorded: March 2013
- Studios: Yoko Eno (Calgary, Alberta)
- Genres: Indie pop; dream pop; indie rock; jangle pop
- Length: 32:55
- Labels: Polyvinyl (US); Royal Mountain (Canada); Transgressive (Europe)
- Producer: Chad VanGaalen

Alvvays chronology
Alvvays (2014)	Antisocialites (2017)

Singles from Alvvays
- 1. "Archie, Marry Me" Released: April 6, 2013; 2. "Adult Diversion" Released: October 28, 2013; 3. "Next of Kin" Released: July 21, 2014; 4. "Party Police" Released: February 23, 2015

Alvvays is the debut studio album by Canadian indie pop band Alvvays, released on July 22, 2014, by Polyvinyl, Royal Mountain and Transgressive. The album yielded four successful singles, the first two, "Adult Diversion" and "Archie, Marry Me" brought the group to prominence in indie pop. The album was met with critical acclaim, regarded as one of the best albums of the year and being shortlisted for the 2015 Polaris Music Prize.

== Background ==
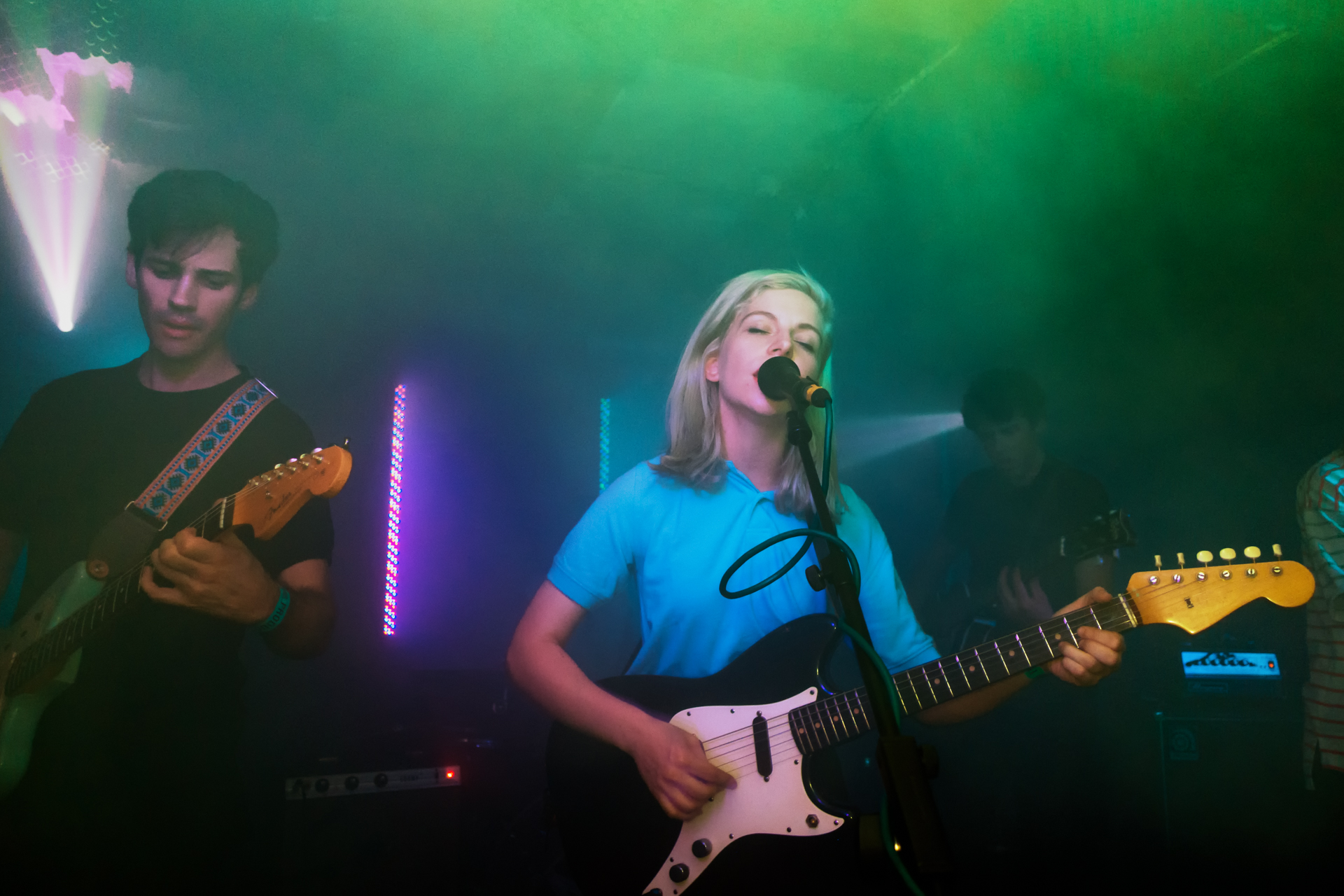
O'Hanley (left) and Rankin (right) on tour in 2014

Alvvays emerged in the early 2010s as an outfit for singer-songwriter Molly Rankin. Rankin's father fronted the Celtic folk collective the Rankin Family, which enjoyed success in Canada in the 1990s. She released an extended play, She, in 2010, with partner Alec O'Hanley assisting. As her writing style evolved, the duo shifted towards writing with a band in mind, and O'Hanley increased his involvement in songwriting. They recruited her childhood friend Kerri MacLellan as keyboardist, as well as bassist Brian Murphy, and drummer Phil MacIsaac. In 2012, they relocated to Toronto, and supported acts Peter Bjorn and John and The Joy Formidable on tours; they began road-testing certain songs, including "Archie", at these concerts.

The album was recorded in March 2013 at Yoko Eno, a studio in Calgary, Alberta owned by musician Chad VanGaalen. The team sought out VanGaalen due to his work on the Women record Public Strain (2010). They utilized VanGaalen's guitars for added distortion and reverb. Rankin called the experience "colorful and engaging" in an interview, noting that VanGaalen was an interesting host and complimenting his percussive suggestions. Drums on the track were handled by Eric Hamelin, best known for his work with Ghostkeeper. VanGaalen suggested that they devise a band name for the project, predicting Rankin would be subject to singer-songwriter connotations if not. The group created the moniker Alvvays, a play on the word "always", which Rankin liked because of its sentimental quality. Holy Fuck's Graham Walsh assisted with tracking at his studio, Basketball4Life, while veteran engineer John Agnello served as mixer. The album and song were mixed at Agnello's Brooklyn space, Music Valve Studios. The album was mastered by Greg Calbi and Steve Fallone at Sterling Sound.

== Musical style ==
The album has been described as Indie pop, dream pop, indie rock, and jangle pop. It has also been described as being influenced by C86, bedroom pop and twee pop, while Rankin has noted personal influences such as The Magnetic Fields, Teenage Fanclub, Dolly Mixture, The Smiths, Celine Dion, Pavement, The Primitives, Oasis and Australian indie-pop group The Hummingbirds.

== Release ==
Two singles were released before the album, "Archie, Marry Me" on April 6, 2013, and "Adult Diversion" on October 29, 2013. The album was released on July 22, 2014. Around the time of the album's release, "Archie, Marry Me" became popular online, and would prove to be the band's breakthrough hit.

The album would see moderate commercial success, peaking at 107 on the UK albums chart, and 12 on the US Heatseekers charts, but failed to be certified by either the RIAA or BPI.

The cover image for the album is a photograph by Helen and Frank Schreider, from the January 1968 issue of National Geographic magazine, featured in the Schreiders' article "In the Footsteps of Alexander the Great"; the photo depicts Iranian schoolgirls in Tehran awaiting a ceremonial appearance of the Shah, Mohammad Reza Pahlavi, on his birthday.

== Reception ==
Professional ratings
Aggregate scores
Source	Rating
AnyDecentMusic?	7.6/10
Metacritic	78/100
Review scores
Source	Rating
AllMusic	5/5 stars
Cuepoint (Expert Witness)	B+
Entertainment Weekly	A−
Exclaim!	8/10
The Guardian	3/5 stars
Mojo	3/5 stars
NME	8/10
Pitchfork	7.6/10
Rolling Stone	4/5 stars
Slant Magazine	4/5 stars

The album received acclaim from critics, and has a 78/100 on Metacritic, indicating "Generally favorable reviews,' according to 22 critics. AllMusic's Fred Thomas gave the album five stars and described it as, "a brief but bright collection of nine songs of nearly perfect, sugar-coated indie pop." Simon Vozick-Levinson of Rolling Stone gave the album four stars, noting, "It’s a rare treat to discover a debut like Alvvays‘. Each of the nine songs on the Toronto band's first LP is a sharply drawn indie-pop wonder, steeped in romance, wit and melody." Lanre Bakare of The Guardian was less positive, saying, "They certainly have their sound down (reverb-laced guitars, big choruses, surf-tinged moments), but there's a lack of variety here. Still, there are some genuinely great moments, including album closer Red Planet, on which the band move away from indie-rock and show they can splice synths with sadness."

=== Accolades ===
Country	Publication	List	Rank
Canada	CBC Music	30 Best Canadian Albums of 2014	1
US	CMJ	The 30 Best Albums of 2014	20
UK	NME	Top 50 Albums of 2014	29
US	Paste	The 50 Best Albums of 2014	5
US	Rolling Stone	50 Best Albums of 2014	36
US	Time Out	20 Best Albums of 2014	20

== Track listing ==
All tracks are written by Molly Rankin and Alec O'Hanley, with additional writers noted.

No.	Title	Writer(s)	Length
1.	"Adult Diversion"	Brian Murphy	3:28
2.	"Archie, Marry Me"		3:17
3.	"Ones Who Love You"	Murphy	3:47
4.	"Next of Kin"	Murphy	3:48
5.	"Party Police"	Murphy	3:48
6.	"The Agency Group"	Murphy	4:31
7.	"Dives"		2:57
8.	"Atop a Cake"		3:20
9.	"Red Planet"		3:59
Total length:			32:55

Japanese edition bonus track
No.	Title	Length
10.	"Underneath Us"	2:39
Total length:		35:33

== Personnel ==
- Molly Rankin – vocals, guitar
- Alec O'Hanley – guitar, vocals, keyboards, drum machine
- Kerri MacLellen – keyboards, vocals
- Brian Murphy – bass
- Eric Hamelin – drums (2, 3, 5, 6)
- Chris Dadge – drums (1, 4, 8)
- Chad VanGaalen – programming, tambourine, bongos

Production

- Chad VanGaalen – engineering and production
- Graham Walsh – tracking (additional)
- Jeff McMurrich – tracking (additional)
- John Agnello – mixing
- Ian McGettigan – mixing (additional)
- Alec O'Hanley – mixing (additional)
- Greg Calbi – mastering
- Steve Fallone – mastering

== Charts ==
Chart (2014)	Peak position
UK Albums (Official Charts)	107
US Heatseekers Albums (Billboard)	12
US Top Current Albums (Billboard)	191
