= Antisocialites =

Studio album by Alvvays
- Released: September 8, 2017
- Studios: Kingsize Soundlabs in Los Angeles, California; Tarbox Road Studios in Cassadaga, New York; Union Sound Studios in Toronto, Ontario
- Genre: Indie pop
- Length: 32:36
- Labels: Polyvinyl (US); Royal Mountain (Canada); Transgressive (Europe); Inertia (Australia)
- Producers: Alec O'Hanley, John Congleton

Alvvays chronology
| Alvvays (2014) | Antisocialites (2017) | Blue Rev (2022) |

Singles from Antisocialites
- 1. "In Undertow" Released: June 6, 2017; 2. "Dreams Tonite" Released: July 25, 2017; 3. "Plimsoll Punks" Released: August 18, 2017

Antisocialites is the second studio album by Canadian indie pop band Alvvays, released on September 8, 2017, through Polyvinyl, Royal Mountain, Transgressive and Inertia.

== Recording and production ==
According to frontwoman Molly Rankin, Antisocialites was recorded using a combination of Pro Tools and a TASCAM 488 8-track recorder.

== Music ==
Tim Sendra of AllMusic said that "the sound of the album is bigger and the arrangements fuller and more spacious, giving the instruments room to breathe." Steven Edelstone of Paste Magazine opined that "by adding a warm synth sheen," the band "managed to make their jangly guitars seem even lusher."

== Critical reception ==
Antisocialites received positive reviews from critics. In a review from Pitchfork, critic Marc Hogan praised the album as being "thoroughly accomplished". Several critics noted that the album was darker than the band's 2014 debut -- Paste Magazine writer Steven Edelstone found the band's comparatively more serious lyrical content as "uneasy", but still a "record that begs to be blasted on road trips and at rooftop parties", while Mike Katzif of NPR interpreted the album's lead track "In Undertow" as a "darker spiritual sequel" to their 2014 breakthrough single "Archie, Marry Me". Canadian music magazine Exclaim ranked Antisocialites as their #1 album in their 2017 year-end list of pop and rock albums, drawing attention to the album's songwriting and "plain and simple" approach.

Professional ratings
Aggregate scores
| Source | Rating |
|---|---|
| AnyDecentMusic? | 7.3/10 |
| Metacritic | 77/100 |
Review scores
| Source | Rating |
| AllMusic | 4/5 stars |
| The A.V. Club | B+ |
| DIY | 5/5 stars |
| Exclaim! | 9/10 |
| The Observer | 3/5 stars |
| Pitchfork | 7.3/10 |
| Q | 3/5 stars |
| Rolling Stone | 3.5/5 stars |
| Uncut | 7/10 |
| Vice | A− |

=== Accolades ===
Antisocialites won the Juno Award for Alternative Album of the Year in 2018. The album was also a shortlisted finalist for the 2018 Polaris Music Prize.

| Publication | Accolade | Rank | Ref. |
|---|---|---|---|
| Exclaim | Top 20 Pop & Rock Albums of 2017 | 1 | |
| The Guardian | The best albums of 2017 | 29 | |
| NME | NME's Albums of the Year 2017 | 17 | |
| Stereogum | The 50 Best Albums of 2017 | 31 | |
| The Ringer | The Best Albums of 2017 | 3 | |

== Track listing ==
All tracks are written by Molly Rankin and Alec O'Hanley.

| No. | Title | Length |
|---|---|---|
| 1. | "In Undertow" | 3:17 |
| 2. | "Dreams Tonite" | 3:16 |
| 3. | "Plimsoll Punks" | 4:50 |
| 4. | "Your Type" | 2:04 |
| 5. | "Not My Baby" | 4:16 |
| 6. | "Hey" | 2:49 |
| 7. | "Lollipop (Ode to Jim)" | 3:18 |
| 8. | "Already Gone" | 3:04 |
| 9. | "Saved by a Waif" | 2:59 |
| 10. | "Forget About Life" | 2:43 |
| Total length: | | 32:36 |

B-sides
| No. | Title | Length |
|---|---|---|
| 1. | "Pecking Order" | 2:47 |
| 2. | "Echolalia" | 1:16 |
| 3. | "Supine Equine" | 1:56 |

== Personnel ==
Credits adapted from the album liner notes.

Alvvays

- Kerri MacLellan – Farfisa, vocals
- Brian Murphy – bass, guitar
- Alec O'Hanley – guitars, vocals, Realistic, bass, recording, production, artwork, mixing
- Molly Rankin – vocals, guitars, fiddle, artwork
- Chris Dadge – drums, percussion

Additional musicians

- Moshe Fisher-Rozenberg – drums
- Jeremy Gaudet – guitars
- Isaac Takeuchi – cello
- Norman Blake – glockenspiel, vocals

Technical and artwork

- John Congleton – recording, production
- Celso Estrada – engineer
- Tyler Karmen – engineer
- Marta Salogni – engineer
- Alex Gamble – engineer
- Graham Walsh – engineer
- Kenny Meehan – engineer
- Matt Estep – mixing
- Justin Nace – additional mixing
- David Ives – mastering
- Anthony Stewart – photography

== Charts ==
| Chart (2017) | Peak position |
|---|---|
| Canadian Albums (Billboard) | 36 |
| New Zealand Heatseekers Albums (RMNZ) | 8 |
| Scottish Albums (Official Charts) | 22 |
| UK Albums (Official Charts) | 28 |
| US Billboard 200 | 82 |
| US Top Alternative Albums (Billboard) | 9 |
| US Independent Albums (Billboard) | 7 |
| US Top Rock Albums (Billboard) | 14 |
