= Blue Rev =

Studio album by Alvvays
- Released: October 7, 2022
- Recorded: October 2021
- Genres: Shoegaze; twee pop; noise pop; power pop
- Length: 38:52
- Labels: Polyvinyl; Transgressive; Celsius Girls
- Producers: Shawn Everett; Molly Rankin; Alec O'Hanley

Alvvays chronology
Antisocialites (2017)	Blue Rev (2022)

Singles from Blue Rev
- 1. "Pharmacist" Released: July 6, 2022; 2. "Easy on Your Own?" Released: August 10, 2022; 3. "Belinda Says / Very Online Guy" Released: September 9, 2022; 4. "After the Earthquake" Released: October 5, 2022

Blue Rev is the third studio album by Canadian indie pop band Alvvays, released on October 7, 2022, via Polyvinyl, Transgressive, and Celsius Girls. The album expands on the shoegaze influences from their previous albums, and received universal acclaim from critics.

== Background ==
Alvvays' second album, Antisocialites was released in 2017. Afterwards, the band went on an extensive tour across North America and Europe, as well as often supporting the National on their tour dates. They began writing songs for Blue Rev almost immediately after the release of Antisocialites, but several events occurred which delayed the progress of the album: a thief broke into lead singer Molly Rankin's apartment and stole a recorder with several demos contained on it, and the day after, a basement flood threatened to destroy all of the band's gear. The COVID-19 pandemic then created further delays, with border closures preventing the band from rehearsing as a full group. They eventually reconvened in October 2021 in a studio in Los Angeles with producer Shawn Everett; they then went on to play all of Blue Rev front-to-back twice in a single day, with 15-second breaks between songs and a 30-minute break between full album takes.

On June 21, 2022, a month before the announcement of Blue Rev, the band announced a 2022 tour of the US between October and November that year. Blue Rev is named after Rev, a Canadian alcoholic beverage.

== Music ==
"Pharmacist" balances the band's signature indie-pop sound with prominent shoegaze elements, including guitar distortion and "dreamy" vocals by Molly Rankin. Quinn Moreland of Pitchfork compared the song to My Bloody Valentine's Loveless. Other musical influences include Morrissey and the Smiths ("Pressed"), Belinda Carlisle ("Belinda Says"), Teenage Fanclub, and Yo La Tengo. The short story collection After the Quake by Japanese author Haruki Murakami inspired the lyrics of "After the Earthquake".

== Promotion ==
Blue Rev was announced on July 6, 2022, alongside the release of the lead single "Pharmacist". The second single, "Easy on Your Own?", was released on August 10, 2022. "Belinda Says" and "Very Online Guy" were released as a double single on September 22, 2022. The final single, "After the Earthquake", was released on October 5, 2022.

== Critical reception ==
Professional ratings
Aggregate scores
Source	Rating
AnyDecentMusic?	8.1/10
Metacritic	86/100
Review scores
Source	Rating
AllMusic	4.5/5 stars
And It Don't Stop	A
Clash	8/10
Exclaim!	9/10
NME	4/5 stars
Paste	8.4/10
Pitchfork	8.8/10

Blue Rev received widespread acclaim from music critics upon its release. At Metacritic, which assigns a normalized rating out of 100 to reviews from professional publications, the album received an average score of 86, based on 15 reviews.

Reviewing the album for AllMusic, Tim Sendra declared that, "the songs are memorable and fun, the performances are inspired, and the production is varied and always interesting," and that "the result is a heavenly indie pop hit guaranteed to make their already besotted fans fall even more head over heels in love with the band." At NME, Will Richards concluded that the album, "stands as an ode to continuing to evolve despite obstacles, slowly honing and tweaking your craft, and keeping on moving." Ben Salmon of Paste wrote, "These are all top-shelf tunes, and they serve as evidence that Rankin and O'Hanley are among the best pop-song writers working today."

Writing for Pitchfork, Jeremy D. Larson claimed, "Alvvays came out with a record that finally is large enough to contain the band's splendor. Every song on Blue Rev is a feast, done up with effortless élan," alongside the publication awarding the album the "Best New Music" tag. Concluding the review for Clash, Bella Savignano called the album, "a magical, twisty excursion to a crossroads where the band simultaneously reflects on yesteryear and explores the turbulence of divergent realities." In Exclaim!, Alex Hudson stated that compared to its namesake, the album "feels less like a hyperactive buzz and more like the crushing hangover the morning after: chaotic, anxiously over-stimulated, and tinged with regretful melancholy."

Veteran critic Robert Christgau recommended the CD edition over streaming the album because of more clarity from the "shoegaze fuzz" he otherwise perceived, while noticing "how explicitly collegiate [the lyrics] were, situating Molly Rankin both culturally, in her devotion to aesthetic usages less staid than 'the lettered life' she once aspired to, and generationally, as the postgrads who populate her songs negotiate love lives they're seldom ready for".

The album won Alternative Album of the Year at the Juno Awards of 2023 and was shortlisted for the 2023 Polaris Music Prize. "Belinda Says" was nominated for Best Alternative Music Performance at the 66th Annual Grammy Awards.

=== Year-end lists ===
Blue Rev on year-end lists
Publication	Accolade	Rank	Ref.
Rolling Stone	The 100 Best Albums of 2022	12	
Exclaim!	Exclaim!'s 50 Best Albums of 2022	1	
The Guardian	The 50 best albums of 2022	25	
The New York Times	Lindsay Zoladz's Best Albums of 2022	7	
NPR	The 50 Best Albums of 2022	33	
Paste	The 50 Best Albums of 2022	3	
Pitchfork	The 50 Best Albums of 2022	3	
Stereogum	The 50 Best Albums of 2022	1	
Flood Magazine	Best Albums of 2022	1	
Treble	The 50 Best Albums of 2022	3	

== Track listing ==
All tracks are written by Molly Rankin and Alec O'Hanley.

Blue Rev track listing
No.	Title	Length
1.	"Pharmacist"	2:04
2.	"Easy on Your Own?"	2:54
3.	"After the Earthquake"	3:05
4.	"Tom Verlaine"	3:26
5.	"Pressed"	2:09
6.	"Many Mirrors"	2:58
7.	"Very Online Guy"	2:22
8.	"Velveteen"	3:09
9.	"Tile by Tile"	2:58
10.	"Pomeranian Spinster"	3:24
11.	"Belinda Says"	2:45
12.	"Bored in Bristol"	3:00
13.	"Lottery Noises"	3:18
14.	"Fourth Figure"	1:20
Total length:		38:52

- On all physical releases of the album, "Fourth Figure" is present but not listed on the tracklist.

== Personnel ==
Alvvays

- Molly Rankin – vocals, guitar
- Alec O'Hanley – guitar, keyboards, bass
- Kerri MacLellan – keyboards, vocals
- Sheridan Riley – drums
- Abbey Blackwell – bass

Additional musicians

- Chris Dadge – drums
- Moshe Fisher-Rozenberg – drums
- Drew Jurecka – cello, viola
- Joseph Shabason – flute, baritone saxophone
- Phil Hartunian – guitar

Technical

- Shawn Everett – production, mixing, engineering
- Molly Rankin – production
- Alec O'Hanley – production, mixing, engineering
- Stephen Koszler – additional engineering
- Phil Hotz – additional engineering
- Robbie Lackritz – additional engineering
- Nyles Spencer – additional engineering
- Julian Decorte – additional engineering
- Amy Fort – additional engineering
- Ivan Wayman – additional engineering

Artwork

- Scott Fitzpatrick – design, layout
- Molly Rankin – design, layout
- Alec O'Hanley – design, layout
- Janet Vanzutphen – photograph
- Nora MacLeod – additional work
- Kerri MacLellen – additional work
- ConcernedApe – Video for "Many Mirrors"

== Charts ==
Chart performance for Blue Rev
Chart (2022)	Peak position
Australian Hitseekers Albums (ARIA)	6
Canadian Albums (Billboard)	75
Scottish Albums (Official Charts)	6
UK Albums (Official Charts)	27
UK Album Downloads (Official Charts)	11
UK Independent Albums (Official Charts)	2
US Billboard 200	61
US Independent Albums (Billboard)	8
US Top Alternative Albums (Billboard)	3
US Top Rock Albums (Billboard)	8
