= Alvvays =

Canadian indie pop band

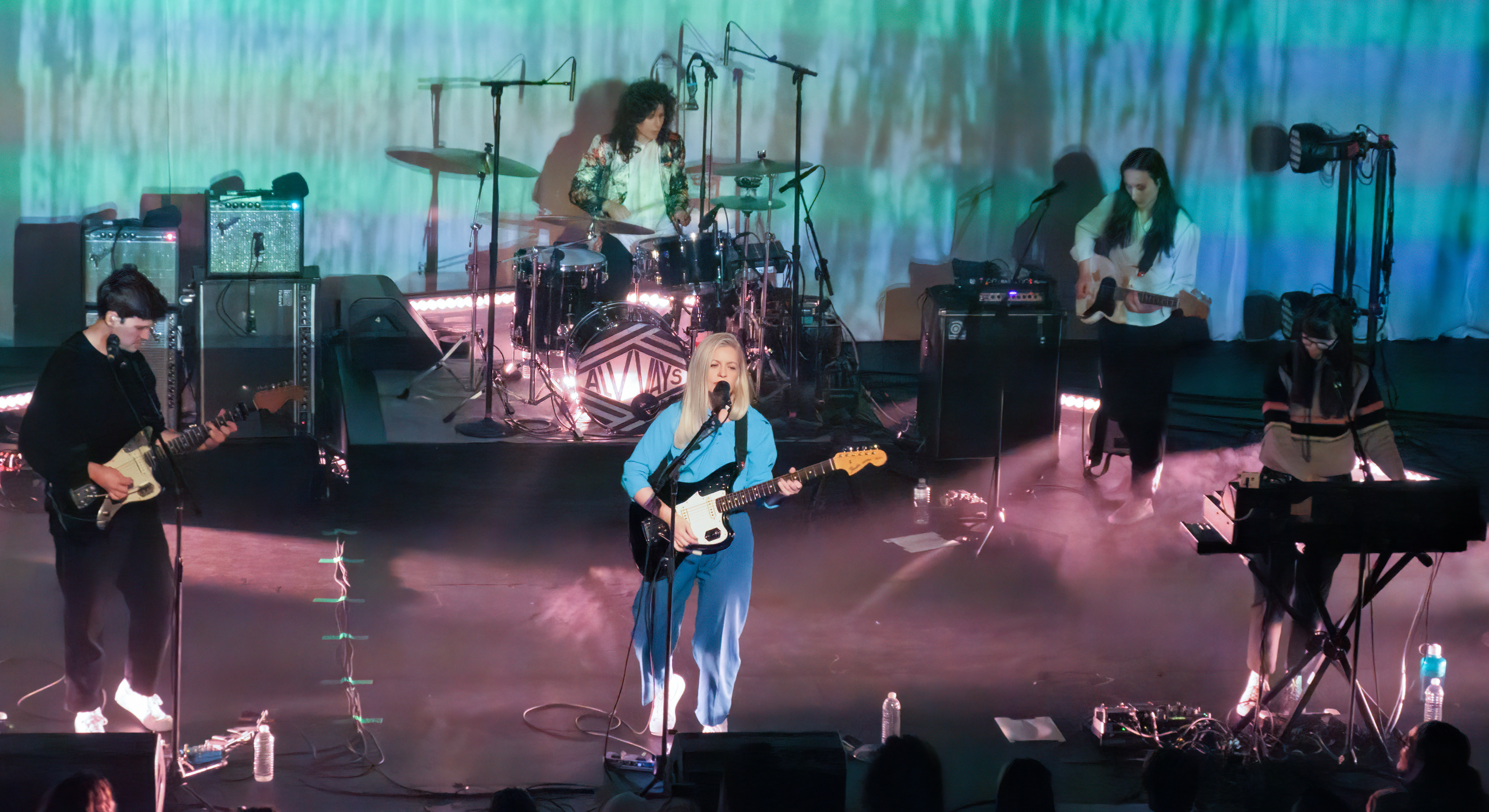
- Alvvays performing at the Moore Theatre in Seattle in 2022

Background information
- Origin: Charlottetown, Prince Edward Island, Canada
- Genres: Indie pop; dream pop; shoegaze; neo-psychedelia; twee pop; jangle pop
- Years active: 2011–present
- Labels: Royal Mountain (Canada); Polyvinyl (US); Transgressive (Europe); Pod / Inertia Music (Australia)
- Members: Molly Rankin; Kerri MacLellan; Alec O'Hanley; Sheridan Riley
- Past members: Phil MacIsaac; Brian Murphy; Abbey Blackwell
- Website: alvvays.com

Alvvays (pronounced "always") is a Canadian indie pop band formed in 2011, originating from Charlottetown, Prince Edward Island, and subsequently based in Toronto, Ontario. It consists of Molly Rankin (vocals and guitar), Kerri MacLellan (keyboards), Alec O'Hanley (guitars), and Sheridan Riley (drums). Their self-titled debut studio album, released in 2014, topped the US college charts. Their second studio album, Antisocialites, was released on September 8, 2017. Their third studio album, Blue Rev, was released on October 7, 2022.

Antisocialites and Blue Rev each won the Juno Award for Alternative Album of the Year. All three of their albums were shortlisted for the Polaris Music Prize. The song "Belinda Says" from Blue Rev was nominated for Best Alternative Music Performance at the 66th Annual Grammy Awards.

== History ==
=== Formation and early years (2011–2015) ===
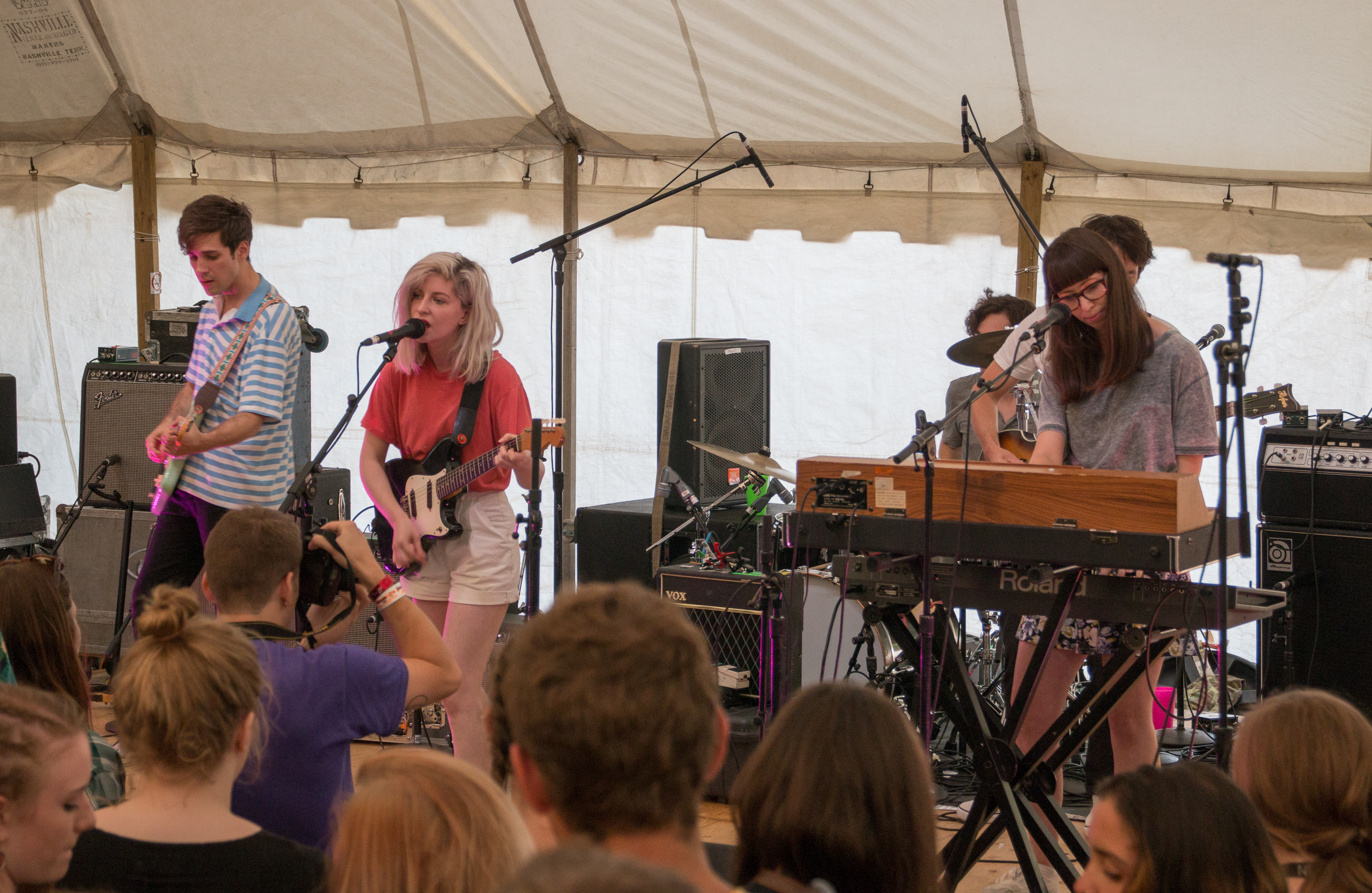
Alvvays performing at the 2014 Hillside Festival

Molly Rankin, the group's singer-songwriter, is the daughter of John Morris Rankin, a fiddler with the Celtic folk family collective The Rankin Family, who enjoyed international success in the 1990s. She wrote and sang the song "Sunset" on the 2007 Rankin Family album Reunion. Rankin grew up in Mabou, Nova Scotia, writing music with her neighbour, keyboardist Kerri MacLellan. She later met guitarist and partner Alec O'Hanley, a Charlottetown, Prince Edward Island native, at a concert. With the help of O'Hanley, Rankin quietly released a solo extended play titled She in 2010. Alvvays was formed the following year, with Rankin recruiting MacLellan, O'Hanley, drummer Phil MacIsaac and bassist Brian Murphy. Rankin picked the name Alvvays because it had a "shred of sentiment and nostalgia." The spelling of the band name was due to the fact that there was already a band named Always signed to Sony.

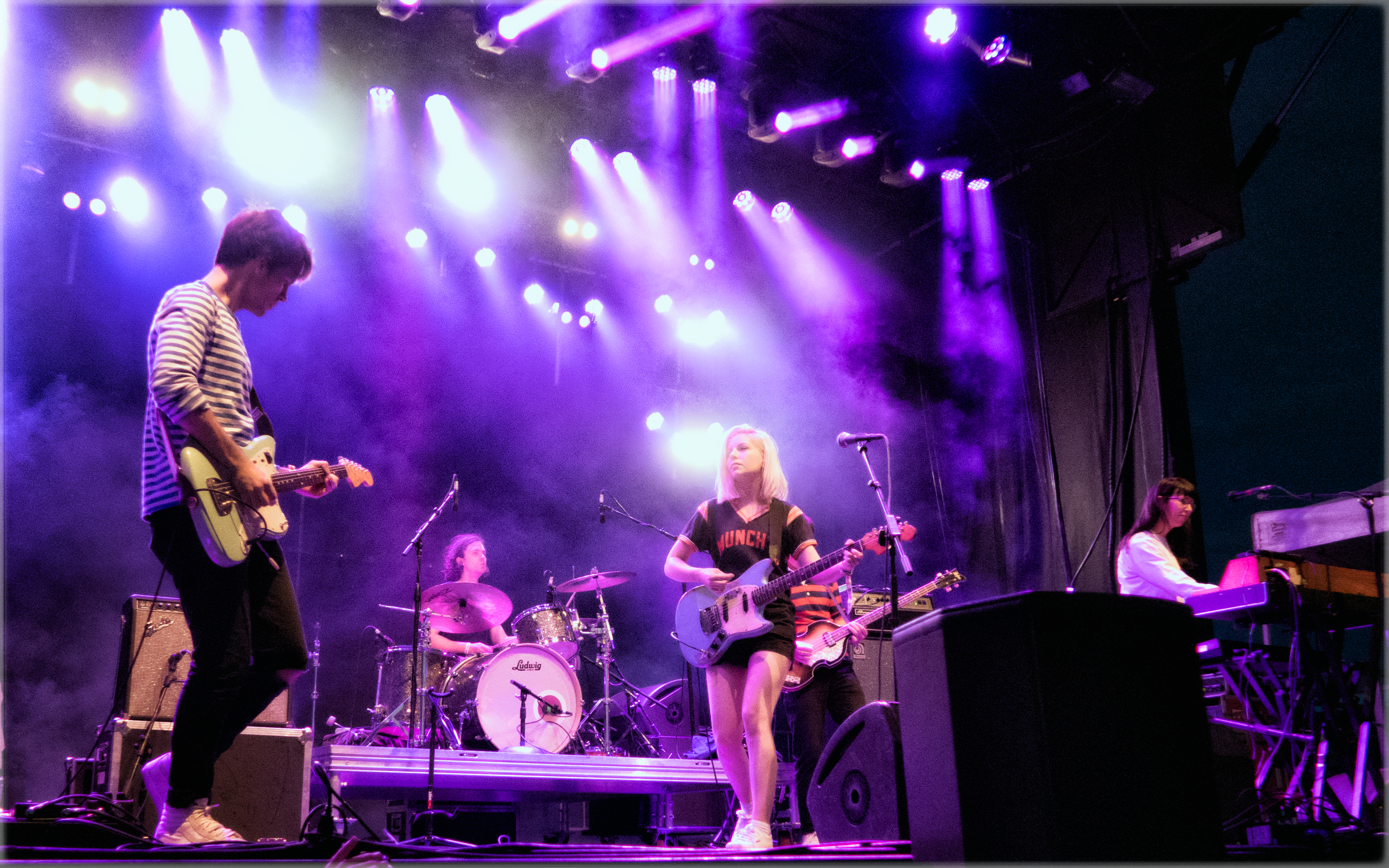
Alvvays performing at the Sasquatch! Music Festival in 2015

The band members moved to Toronto and secured jobs that allowed them to tour occasionally. The group toured extensively as supporting acts for bands such as Peter Bjorn and John and the Decemberists. Their self-titled debut studio album, Alvvays, was recorded in Calgary with Chad VanGaalen in March 2013; Graham Walsh helped track the album while John Agnello helped mix it.

Alvvays were signed to Polyvinyl Records (US) on the strength of their performances at South by Southwest and online response to the demo of their single "Adult Diversion". The album Alvvays was released by Royal Mountain Records (Canada), Polyvinyl Records (US) and Transgressive Records (Europe) in July 2014. Simon Vozick-Levinson, writing in Rolling Stone, called the album an "indie-pop wonder". Alvvays went to No. 1 on US college charts on August 5, 2014; in November that year they performed in Los Angeles with another Canadian band, Absolutely Free.

"Archie, Marry Me" became a minor hit. The single for "Archie, Marry Me" featured the B-side "Underneath Us" which was recorded after the eponymous album.

The group toured heavily in support of their debut, including slots at Glastonbury 2015 and Coachella Valley Music and Arts Festival in 2016.

The debut album was nominated to the shortlist of the 2015 Polaris Music Prize. They performed at that year's gala with the Toronto Symphony Orchestra. At the Juno Awards of 2015, the band was nominated as Breakthrough Group of the Year, and Alvvays was nominated for Alternative Album of the Year.

=== Antisocialites (2016–2018) ===
Alvvays began recording and writing their second studio album in 2015. Several new original songs had been performed throughout 2014 and 2015, including "Your Type" (often the opening song of the show), "New Haircut" (later retitled "Saved By A Waif") and "Hey". In 2016 they added "Not My Baby" and "Dreams" to their performance repertoire.

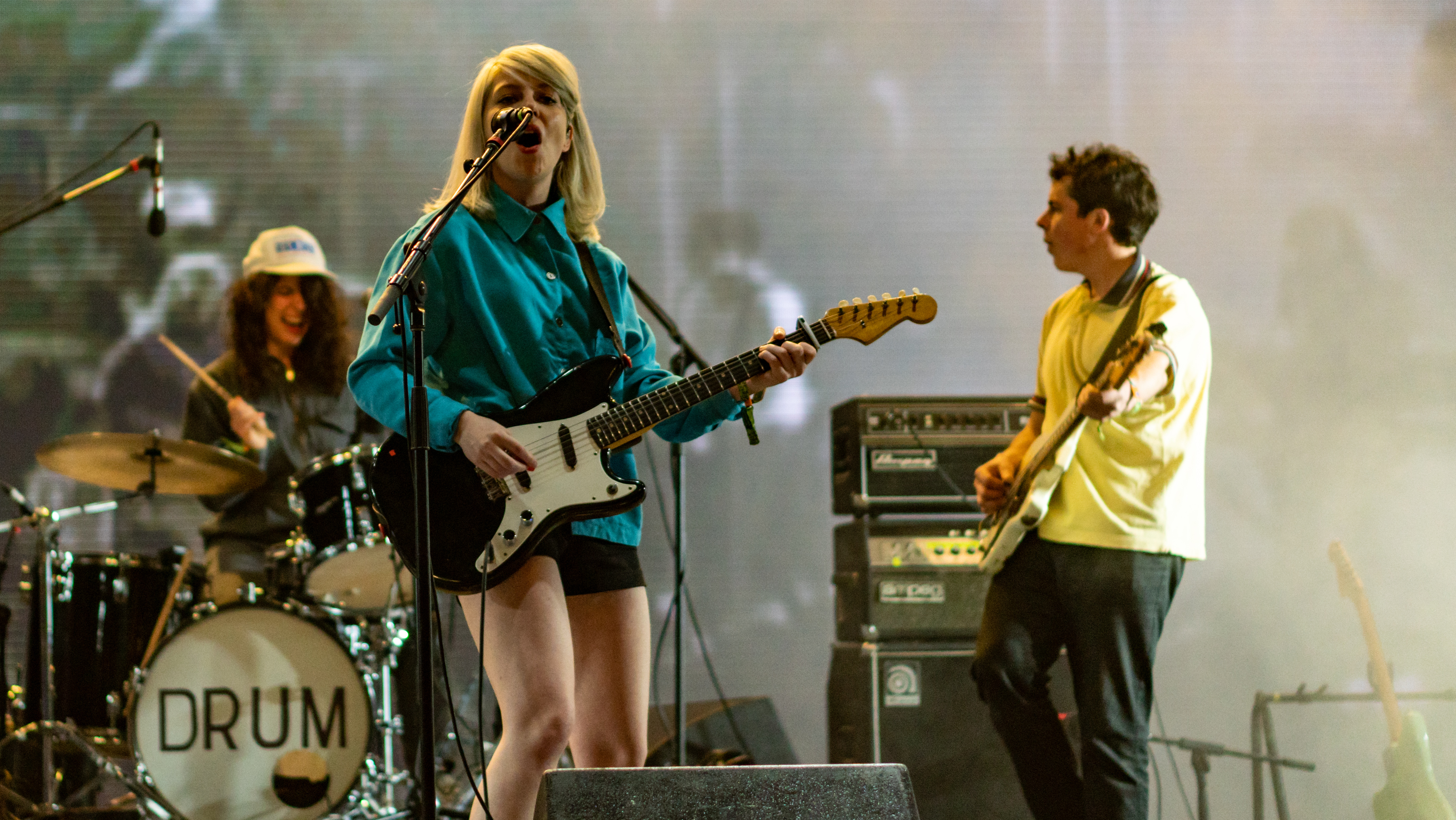
Alvvays performing at Coachella in 2018

Following the addition of new songs such as "Plimsoll Punks" as part of live shows in spring 2017, Alvvays released a teaser clip of a song called "In Undertow" from their second album, Antisocialites. Along with songs performed at previous shows, new songs for this record included "Already Gone", "Forget About Life", "In Undertow", "Lollipop (Ode to Jim)" and "Saved by a Waif". The album was released on September 8, 2017. A North American and European tour in support of the album was announced for autumn 2017. In 2016, Phil MacIsaac left the music industry for a career in graphic design; he was replaced by Sheridan Riley. A second UK tour in spring 2018 was announced in September 2017.

On September 16, 2017, at a show in Antwerp, a male audience member jumped on stage and attempted to kiss singer Molly Rankin. Ken Veerman, the director at Trix, the show's venue, apologized on Facebook.

In 2018 the band received a SOCAN Songwriting Prize nomination for the song "Dreams Tonite", and Antisocialites was shortlisted for the 2018 Polaris Music Prize. At the Juno Awards of 2018, Alvvays was nominated as Group of the Year and Antisocialites won the Juno Award for Alternative Album of the Year.

=== Blue Rev (2021–present) ===
Between 2019 and 2022, members of Alvvays largely stayed out of the public eye, with suggestions that the band had disbanded. Bassist and founding member Brian Murphy left the band in 2021. Alvvays released "Pharmacist", the first single from their third album Blue Rev, on July 6, 2022. Blue Rev was released on October 7, 2022. "Belinda Says", the third single from Blue Rev, was nominated for Best Alternative Music Performance at the 66th Annual Grammy Awards.

== Musical style and influences ==
Alvvays' music has been described as jangle pop by the music press and the band's members. According to Rankin, the band's emphasis is primarily on strong melodies rather than for a specific genre. The band has been compared to Camera Obscura; Rankin noted she shared vocalist Tracyanne Campbell's "fondness for the pathetic perspective." Rankin sought inspiration from Stephin Merritt, frontman of the Magnetic Fields, appreciating the honest but lighthearted nature of his lyrics. Rankin's personal influences include The Magnetic Fields, Teenage Fanclub, Dolly Mixture, The Smiths, Celine Dion, Pavement, The Primitives, Cocteau Twins, Oasis and Australian indie-pop group The Hummingbirds. While the band does not have an overt Celtic music sound, Rankin acknowledges that she was immersed in the genre from childhood, and it has a discernible influence on the way she sings and writes melodies, including comparisons to the Cranberries.

== Band members ==
=== Current ===
- Molly Rankin – vocals, rhythm guitar (2011–present), bass guitar (2022–present)
- Kerri MacLellan – keyboards, backing vocals (2011–present)
- Alec O'Hanley – lead guitar, keyboards, backing vocals (2011–present)
- Sheridan Riley – drums, percussion, backing vocals (2017–present)

=== Former ===
- Phil MacIsaac – drums (2011–2016)
- Brian Murphy – bass guitar (2011–2021)
- Abbey Blackwell – bass guitar, backing vocals (2021–2024)

=== Touring ===
- Lukas Cheung – bass guitar (2024)

== Discography ==
=== Albums ===
List of studio albums, with selected chart positions and certifications
Title	Album details	Peak chart positions									
Title	Album details	CAN	AUS Hit	NL Vinyl	NZ Heat	SCO	UK	UK Indie	US	US Indie	US Rock
Alvvays	Released: July 22, 2014; Label(s): Polyvinyl (US) Royal Mountain (Canada) Transgressive	—	—	—	—	—	107	17	— (Note: Alvvays did not enter the US Billboard 200, but peaked at number 12 on the US Heatseekers Albums Chart.)	—	—
Antisocialites	Released: September 8, 2017; Label(s): Polyvinyl (US) Royal Mountain (Canada) Transgressive (Europe) Pod / Inertia Music (Australia)	36	18	—	8	22	28	6	82	7	14
Blue Rev	Released: October 7, 2022; Label(s): Polyvinyl, Celsius Girls	75	6	33	—	6	27	2	61	8	8
"—" denotes a recording that did not chart or was not released in that territory.

=== Singles ===
List of singles, with selected chart positions, showing year released and album name
Title	Year	Peak chart positions		Certifications	Album
Title	Year	CAN Rock	US AAA	Certifications	Album
"Adult Diversion"	2013	—	—		Alvvays
"Archie, Marry Me"	2014	—	—	MC: Gold; RIAA: Gold	Alvvays
"Next of Kin"	2014	—	—		Alvvays
"Party Police"	2015	—	—		Alvvays
"Not My Baby"	2017	—	—		Antisocialites
"In Undertow"	2017	48	—		Antisocialites
"Dreams Tonite"	2017	—	—	MC: Gold	Antisocialites
"Plimsoll Punks"	2017	—	—		Antisocialites
"Lollipop (Ode to Jim)"	2017	—	—		Antisocialites
"Pharmacist"	2022	—	—		Blue Rev
"Easy On Your Own?"	2022	50	32		Blue Rev
"Belinda Says" / "Very Online Guy"	2022	—	—		Blue Rev
"After the Earthquake"	2022	—	—		Blue Rev
"—" denotes a recording that did not chart or was not released in that territory.

=== Music videos ===
- 2013: "Adult Diversion"
- 2014: "Archie, Marry Me"
- 2014: "Next of Kin"
- 2017: "In Undertow"
- 2017: "Dreams Tonite"
- 2022: "Pharmacist"
- 2022: "Easy On Your Own?"
- 2022: "Very Online Guy"
- 2022: "Belinda Says"
- 2022: "After the Earthquake"
- 2022: "Many Mirrors"

== Awards and nominations ==
Year	Association	Category	Nominated work	Result	Ref
2015	Juno Awards	Breakthrough Group of the Year	Alvvays	Nominated	
2015	Juno Awards	Alternative Album of the Year	Alvvays	Nominated	
2015	Libera Awards	Breakthrough Artist of the Year	Alvvays	Nominated	
2015	Polaris Music Prize	Album of the Year	Alvvays	Shortlisted	
2018	Juno Awards	Group of the Year	Alvvays	Nominated	
2018	Juno Awards	Alternative Album of the Year	Antisocialites	Won	
2018	Polaris Music Prize	Album of the Year	Antisocialites	Shortlisted	
2023	Juno Awards	Alternative Album of the Year	Blue Rev	Won	
2023	Libera Awards	Record of the Year	Blue Rev	Nominated	
2023	Libera Awards	Best Alternative Rock Record	Blue Rev	Nominated	
2023	Polaris Music Prize	Album of the Year	Blue Rev	Shortlisted	
2024	Grammy Awards	Best Alternative Music Performance	"Belinda Says"	Nominated	
