= Archie, Marry Me =

2013 song by indie pop band Alvvays

Single by Alvvays

from the album Alvvays
- Released: April 6, 2013
- Recorded: March 2013
- Studio: Yoko Eno (Calgary, Alberta)
- Genre: Indie pop (Note: Critics frequently referred to "Archie" as an indie pop song, though others have also classified it as indie rock, twee pop, dream pop, guitar pop, or surf rock.)
- Length: 3:17
- Label: Royal Mountain; Polyvinyl; Transgressive
- Songwriters: Alec O'Hanley; Molly Rankin
- Producer: Chad VanGaalen

Alvvays singles chronology
"Archie, Marry Me" (2013)	"Adult Diversion" (2013)

"Archie, Marry Me" is a song by Canadian indie pop band Alvvays. It was released on April 6, 2013, as the lead single from the band's eponymous debut album (2014). "Archie, Marry Me" examines modern romance and traditional marriage, and touches on themes of commitment and financial stability. It was written by vocalist and guitarist Molly Rankin with guitarist Alec O'Hanley as a critique of the standard societal expectation that one is to marry upon entering adulthood.

Rankin and O'Hanley were romantically linked, and had been collaborating for some time creatively. Then in their mid-twenties, they observed with derision friends quickly being wed. "Archie" was first developed during a period in which they lived on Prince Edward Island in a remote farmhouse. The song and accompanying album were produced by Chad VanGaalen, and recorded at his studio, Yoko Eno, in Calgary, Alberta. The song's lo-fi music video, filmed on a Super 8 camera, pictures Rankin at a wedding reception and sailing on the sea.

"Archie" was the first song the band released; it debuted digitally via the band's website before the band was signed to a label. It was later released on Royal Mountain Records, in their home country. In the U.S. and Europe, it was distributed through Polyvinyl and Transgressive Records, respectively. Though it did not chart, "Archie" was considered the band's breakthrough hit; it grew in popularity in the mid-2010s on streaming services. Critical reviews of the track were very positive, praising its bittersweet tone and lyrical content. It was ranked on several best-of lists in 2014, and has been called an "indie-pop classic."

== Background ==
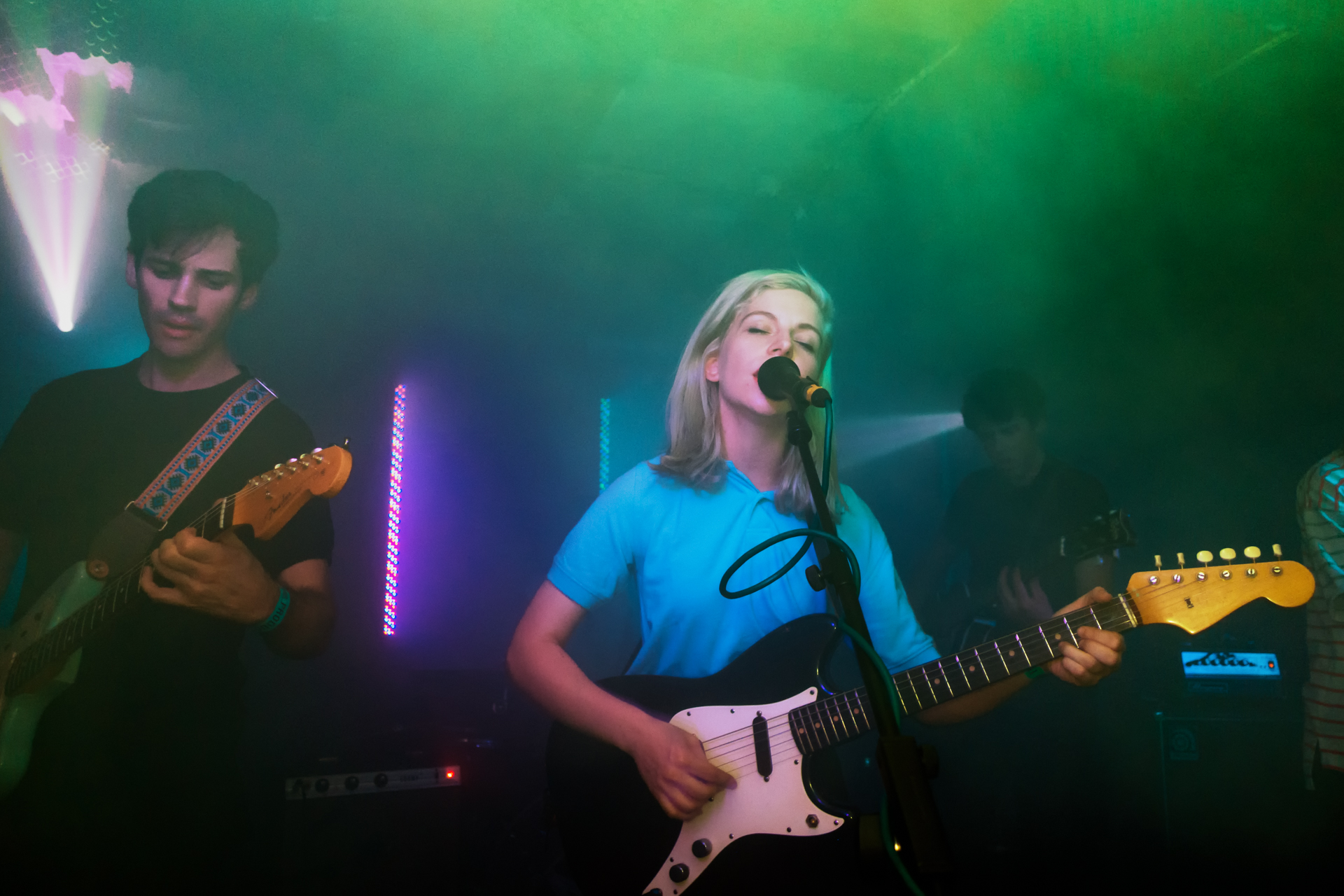
O'Hanley (left) and Rankin (right) on tour in 2014

Alvvays emerged in the early 2010s as an outfit for singer-songwriter Molly Rankin. Rankin's father fronted the Celtic folk collective the Rankin Family, which enjoyed international success in the 1990s. She released an extended play, She, in 2010, with partner Alec O'Hanley assisting. As her writing style evolved, the duo shifted towards writing with a band in mind, and O'Hanley increased his involvement in songwriting. They recruited her childhood friend Kerri MacLellan as keyboardist, as well as bassist Brian Murphy, and drummer Phil MacIsaac. In 2012, they relocated to Toronto, and supported acts Peter Bjorn and John and The Joy Formidable on tours; they began road-testing certain songs, including "Archie", at these concerts.

The song—as well as Alvvays' self-titled debut LP—was recorded in March 2013 at Yoko Eno, a studio in Calgary, Alberta owned by musician Chad VanGaalen. The team sought out VanGaalen due to his work on the Women record Public Strain (2010). They utilized VanGaalen's guitars for added distortion and reverb. Rankin called the experience "colorful and engaging" in an interview, noting that VanGaalen was an interesting host and complimenting his percussive suggestions. Drums on the track were handled by Eric Hamelin, best known for his work with Ghostkeeper. VanGaalen suggested that they devise a band name for the project, predicting Rankin would be subject to singer-songwriter connotations if not. The group created the moniker Alvvays, a play on the word "always", which Rankin liked because of its sentimental quality. Holy Fuck's Graham Walsh assisted with tracking at his studio, Basketball4Life, while veteran engineer John Agnello served as mixer. The album and song were mixed at Agnello's Brooklyn space, Music Valve Studios. O'Hanley earnestly e-mailed Agnello, requesting his involvement, to which he agreed. The album was mastered by Greg Calbi and Steve Fallone at Sterling Sound.

== Composition ==
"Archie" was written in the key of G major, and follows a simple I-V-ii-IV chord progression. The song begins with the faint noise of birds chirping, before O'Hanley and Rankin come in on guitar, strumming the chords that the song cycles repeatedly. This sequence has been described as "sparse and dreamy." The sounds were achieved on dual Fender guitars with slight distortion, "accentuating the top end of the guitars' frequency range." Hamelin subsequently initiates a "driving backbeat" on his kit, while the guitar work possesses a contemplative, jangly sound. The song carries a considerable amount of reverb, sonically. O'Hanley introduces a counter-melody to the vocal line on a Fender Jazzmaster, making heavy use of the tremolo bar. The song has been variously categorized under the genres indie pop, indie rock, twee pop, dream pop, guitar pop, and surf rock. The song's tone was frequently compared to the acts Camera Obscura, Belle and Sebastian, and Teenage Fanclub, which were all influences on the group.

"Archie, Marry Me"
A sample of the song's chorus, with a tone similar to the works of Camera Obscura, Belle and Sebastian, and Teenage Fanclub.

Rankin wrote the song before Alvvays was formed. The song came at a period in which she had moved from Halifax, where she was attending school, to Prince Edward Island, and waitressed at a pub to make ends meet. She wrote the song at a rural farmhouse she lived in with O'Hanley for a year. The town had gone through its worst snowstorm in thirty years, and the home was engulfed in 6 ft (1.8 m) of snow. She remembered: "We had a snowmobile to get to the road, but we ended up burying the snowmobile. I guess we were inspired by it being so bleak". In an interview, Rankin detailed the track as "an open assessment on the idea of marriage." It criticizes the standard expectation to marry when one reaches adulthood. Rankin at this period was in her mid-twenties and observed that while many of her friends were engaged to be married, she was not and pursuing a different path. She went into detail about this expectation: "We [all] watch a lot of people 'grow up' and get mortgages and have big dumb weddings [...] In society it's sort of looked at as 'The Next Level'." She hoped to profile untypical types of love in the song, such as the dangerous type of partnership embodied by the criminal couple Bonnie and Clyde. The character Archie is fictitious. Rankin took the name for the character from Archie Rankin, her geologist/musician cousin formerly of the band Mardeen. "He's a very burly, curly-haired, super Scottish fisherman type. I think he was very perplexed about it," Rankin admitted. Some journalists took the title as a reference to Archie Comics, which Rankin confirmed was untrue.

Throughout the song, Rankin yearns for this partner's commitment. Each refrain begins with Rankin shouting "Hey" twice, before crooning the title. She paints a portrait of a lover burdened by financial pressure and unwilling to consider marriage: "You've expressed explicitly your contempt for matrimony / You've student loans to pay and will not risk the alimony." These lyrics have been interpreted as a reference to the increasing cost of student loan debt in North America at the time of the song's release. Rankin implores her beau to disregard his worries, and a proper ceremony, and simply unionize legally: "So honey, take me by the hand and we can sign some papers / Forget the invitations, floral arrangements, and bread makers." Pitchfork writer Stuart Berman interpreted these verses as "[sounding] less like she's fighting for the love of her life than checking items off a list." In an interview, she described the song as "Just two kids without any direction, doing it on a whim in a courthouse, saying 'Who cares?' to everyone else who has all of their ducks in a row before settling down. It was the most romantic thing I could think of at the time." Mike Katzif of NPR interpreted Rankin's point of view as confrontation of her own "conflicting motives and outside expectations." Its lyrics have been considered tongue-in-cheek, while its subject matter has been characterized as melancholy or bittersweet.

== Music video ==
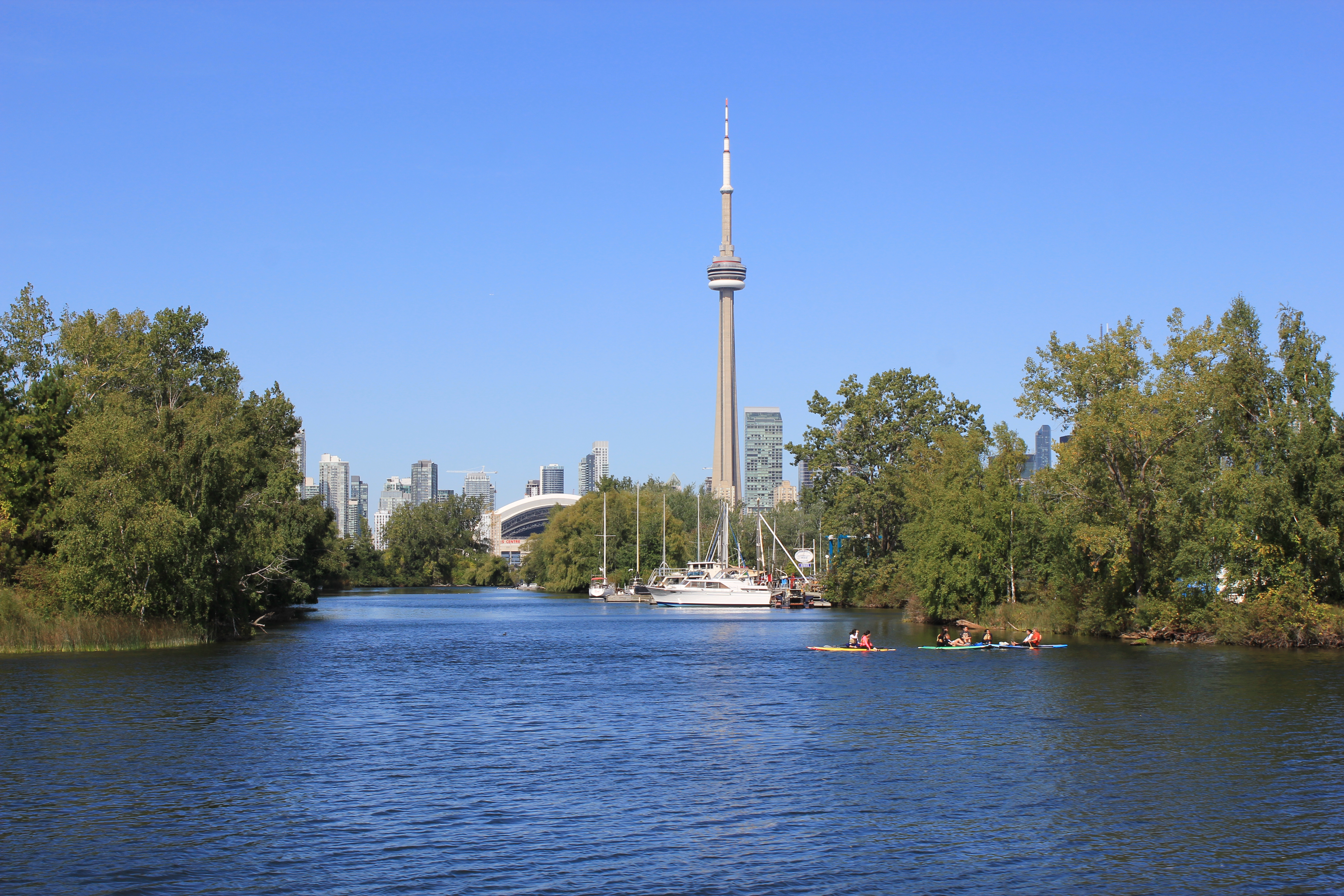
View from Toronto Islands, where the song's music video was shot

The song's official music video, directed by Gavin Keen and Allison Johnston, was released on July 30, 2014. In the grainy, lo-fi video, the band employ driftwood and a wedding cake to spell out the song's title, which is also spelled in sign language. Rankin is then depicted in a wedding dress, walking with a groom amidst a cloud of confetti. It also features the band sailing on a boat, an aquarium, a freak show, and images of the seafront at Coney Island. The sailboat was borrowed from a friend's parents, and the seaside shots were filmed off the coast of the Toronto Islands.

For "Archie", the band initially shot with a full crew and professional high-definition digital equipment, but they concluded it did not feel like them. The group shot the final clip themselves using a Super 8 film camera, as they did in their video for "Adult Diversion" (2013). Halfway through filming, the camera battery was damaged by seawater. The group neutralized the battery fluid using vinegar and resumed filming.

Employing outdated technology to film a music video was not a new concept, and several other indie music videos of this era utilize the Super 8 specifically, including the clips for the Pains of Being Pure at Heart's "Everything with You" (2008), Edward Sharpe and the Magnetic Zeros' "Home" (2010), and Toro y Moi's "Still Sound" (2011). "The video is full of unstable handheld shots, discoloration, over-exposure, and dust marks, which further reinforce the appearance of the video as being homemade," observed editors Lori A. Burns and Stan Hawkins in their 2019 Handbook of Popular Music Video Analysis. Alex Hudson of Exclaim! described the clip: "[The band] don some nifty sweaters and neckerchiefs, while some psychedelically colour-tinted effects add to the wooziness of the proceedings." Robin Murray at Clash described the video as "wry, funny, and cute."

== Release ==
"Archie, Marry Me" was initially self-released as an early demo. The song was uploaded to SoundCloud and shared via the band's official website/Tumblr on April 6, 2013. Likewise, early copies of the album were made on cassette for festival bookers and fans at concerts to pass around. The song wasn't an immediate hit, and it took months for it to attract attention. "Archie" made its way onto various indie MP3 blogs, as did their second single "Adult Diversion" (2013), which led to their signing to independent record label Royal Mountain Records in late 2013. In the United States and Europe, "Archie" was licensed to Polyvinyl and Transgressive Records, respectively. On April 24, 2014, Polyvinyl began promoting "Archie, Marry Me" in the lead-up to the album's release via digital download; later that year, they issued it as a 7" single, with "Adult Diversion" as its B-side, exclusively to mail-order subscribers. Both the aforementioned companies distributed promo CDs with those tracks in their countries, aiming for airplay on college radio stations. Altogether, the song did not chart commercially. Troy Reimink, writing for the Detroit Free Press, suggested that "in another era, [the song would be] inescapable on the radio."

"Archie" became popular online in mid-2014, finding an audience organically. It "lifted the Toronto quartet out of obscurity," and was considered the band's breakthrough hit. Spin's Ilana Kaplan wrote that it "garnered the attention of both indie-rock and pop fans alike." Broadcaster Talia Schlanger said the song "turned the unknown band from Toronto into instant indie darlings." Its success was considered unusual in that it lacked hallmarks of young indie bands' success stories, such as licensing it for placement on television. Its publicity was also credited to Stars singer Torquil Campbell, who, on the CBC Radio One show Q, proclaimed it as his song of the summer. AllMusic biographer Scott Kerr credits the album's "sensational" popularity to "Archie, Marry Me". It went viral on Spotify, and was a favorite of BBC Radio 6 Music, an alternative digital station.

== Reception ==
Ryan Dombal of Pitchfork, in his review, likened its sound to Neil Young, and complimenting its commitment to a more contemporary union as "a new sort of forever [...] some ideas—some desires—have ways of sticking around." Chicago Tribune editorialist Josh Terry considered the song timeless, calling it "likable pop wrapped in a jangly, indie rock package." He considered it similar to indie fore-bearers Teenage Fanclub or My Bloody Valentine, but thematically akin to "the lovelorn innocence of the Beatles." Spin's Ilana Kaplan praised the song as "superlatively catchy," while Miles Bowe from Stereogum complimented its bittersweet tone and heavy guitars. Katzif of NPR abstractly compared its refrain to the feeling of summer, praising its "crisp guitars, [and] effervescent melodies," as well as its "deceptively more nuanced" lyrical content. Rolling Stone contributor Simon Vozick-Levinson extolled it as the "kind of song some acts spend careers trying to write."

The song has been covered by musician Ben Gibbard, best known for his band Death Cab for Cutie, who considered it his favorite song of that year. The song was ranked among the best tracks of 2014 by Rolling Stone, NME, Pitchfork, and the Washington Post. Rolling Stone later placed it at number 28 on its list of the 100 Best Songs of the 2010s, and altogether among the best new songs of the 21st century. "Archie, Marry Me" has repeatedly been called an "indie-pop classic," and widely interpreted as a love song. Its satirical portrayal of marriage rather was lost on some listeners; Vozick-Levinson called it "one of the decade's most romantic songs at the same." For Rankin, this was a rather unintentional conclusion to reach, but she conceded that "I'm glad people can glean their own narrative from the song."

== Credits and personnel ==
Credits adapted from Alvvays's liner notes.

Alvvays

- Molly Rankin – guitar, vocals, songwriting
- Alec O'Hanley – guitar, vocals, songwriting, keyboards, drum machine, additional mixing
- Brian Murphy – bass guitar
- Eric Hamelin – drums

Production

- Chad VanGaalen – producer, recording engineer, programmer, tambourine, bongos
- Graham Walsh – additional tracking
- Jeff McMurrich – additional tracking
- John Agnello – mixing
- Ian McGettigan – additional mixing
- Greg Calbi – mastering engineer
- Steve Fallone – additional mastering

== Certifications ==
Certifications for "Archie, Marry Me"
Region	Certification	Certified units/sales
United States (RIAA)	Gold	500,000^{‡}
^{‡} Sales+streaming figures based on certification alone.
